= List of mammals of Kerala =

This is a list of mammal species found in Kerala, India.

== Order: Artiodactyla ==
=== Family: Bovidae ===
==== Genus: Bos ====
===== Species: Bos gaurus (gaur / കാട്ടുപോത്ത്) =====
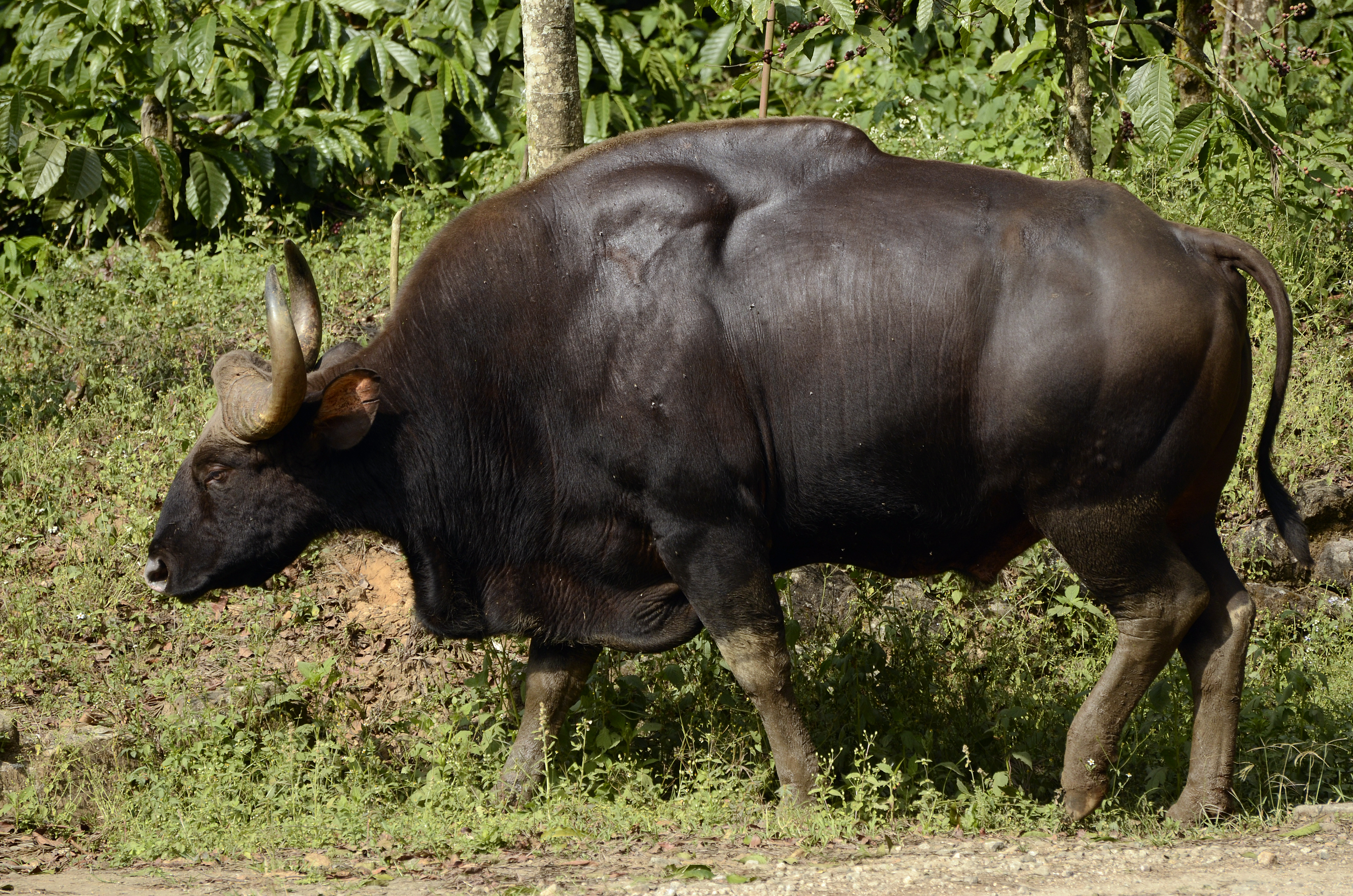
male

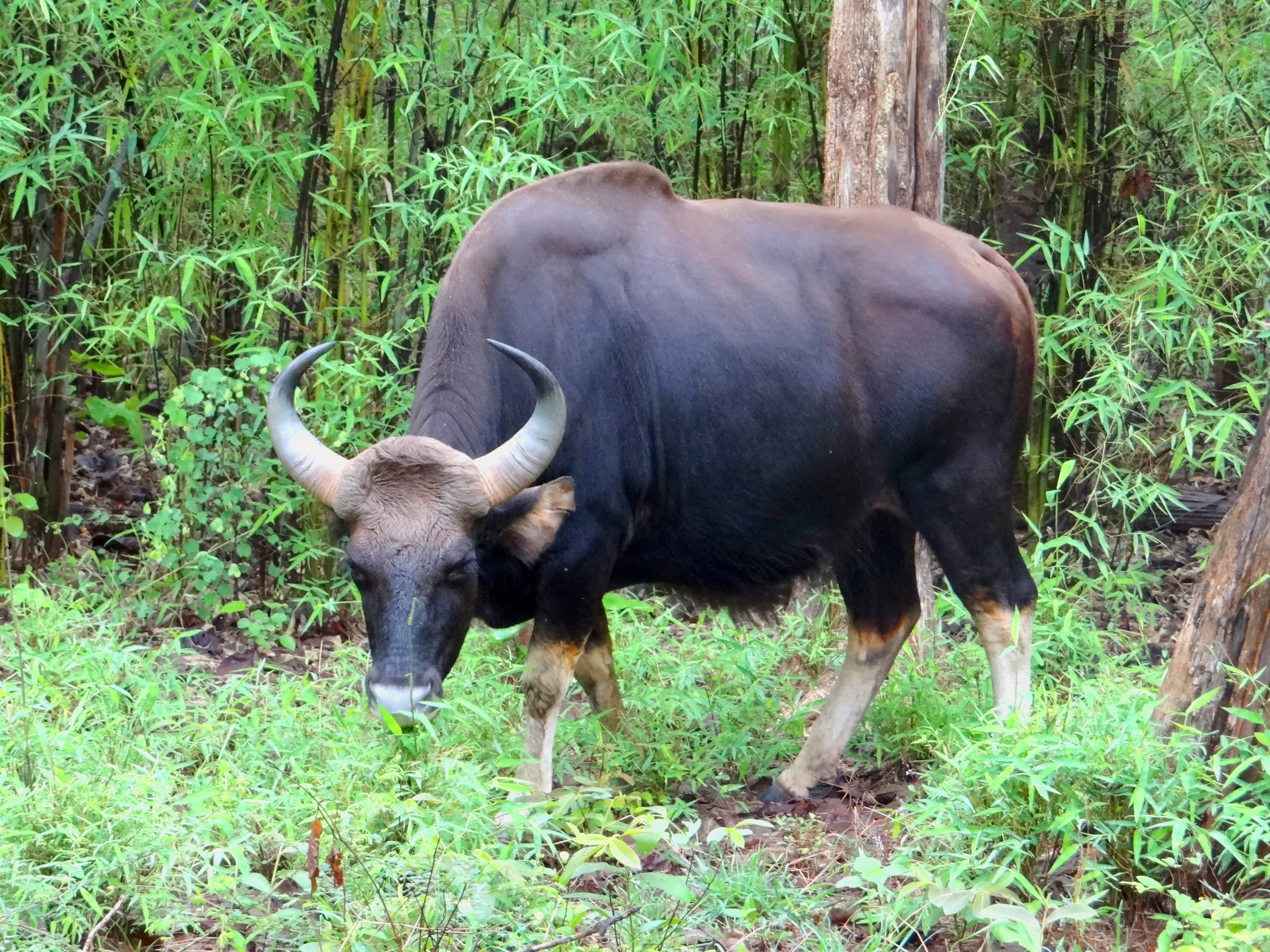
male

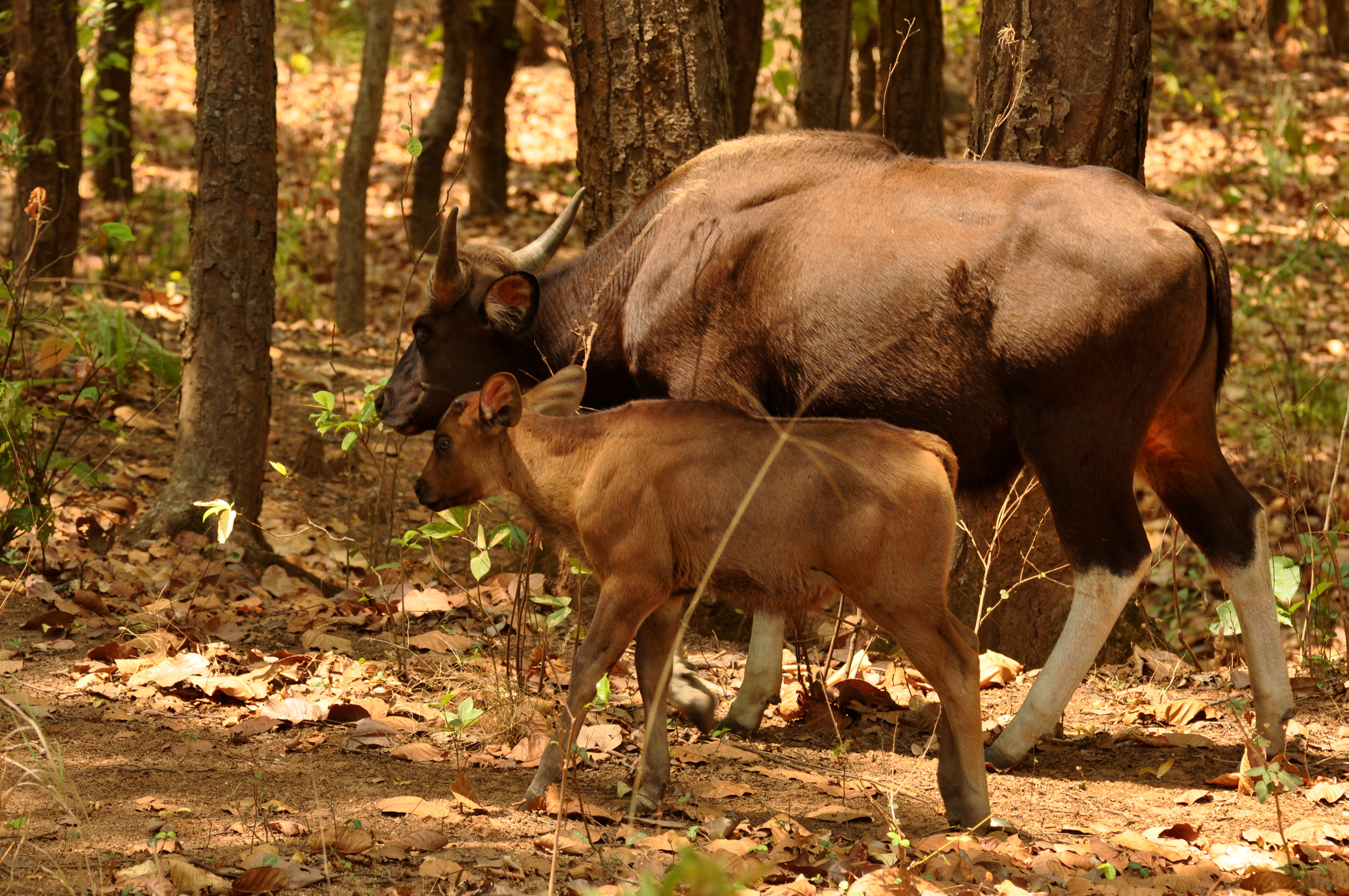
female with calf

==== Genus: Nilgiritragus ====
===== Species: Nilgiritragus hylocrius (Nilgiri tahr / വരയാട്) =====
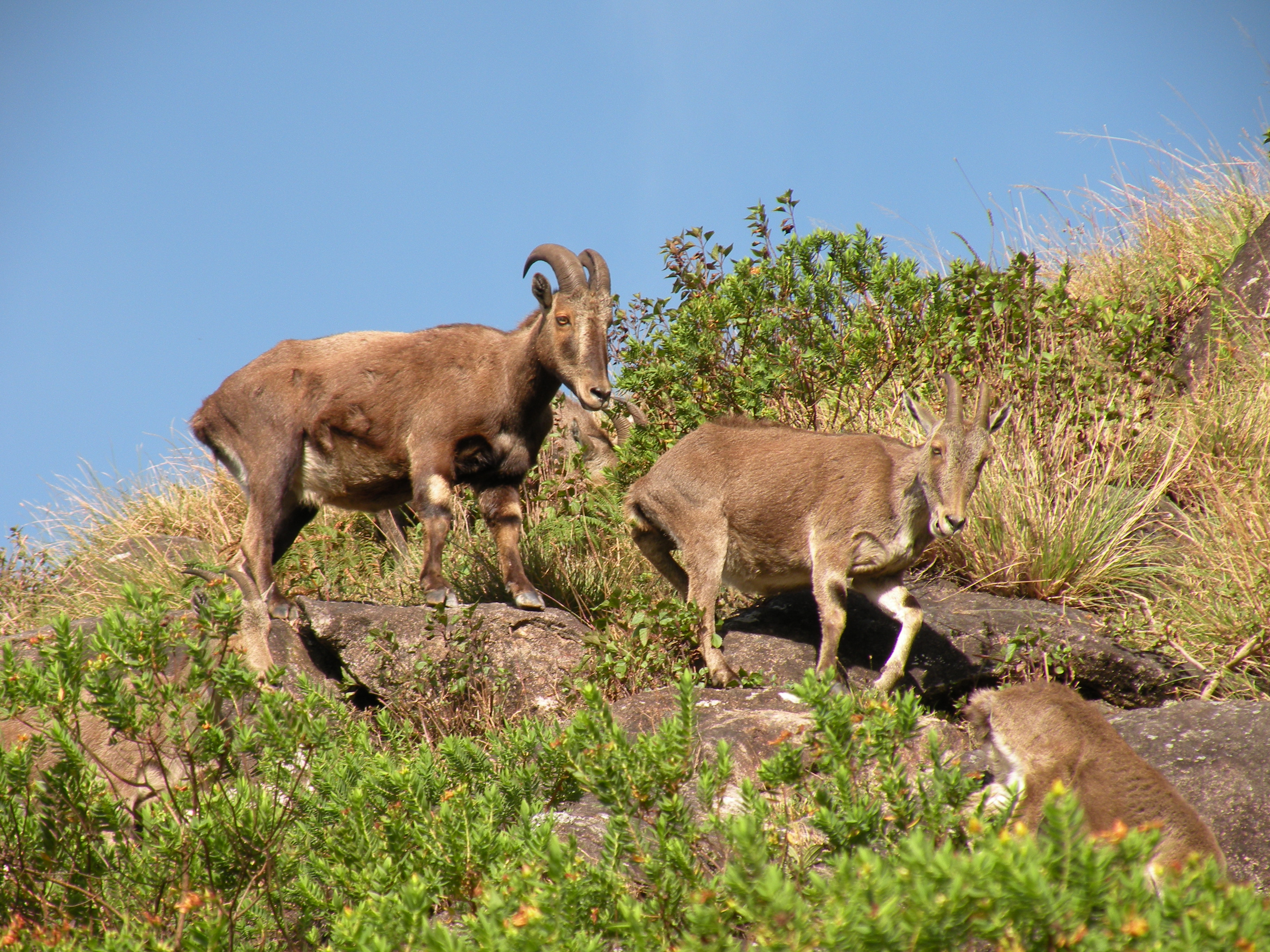
male (left)

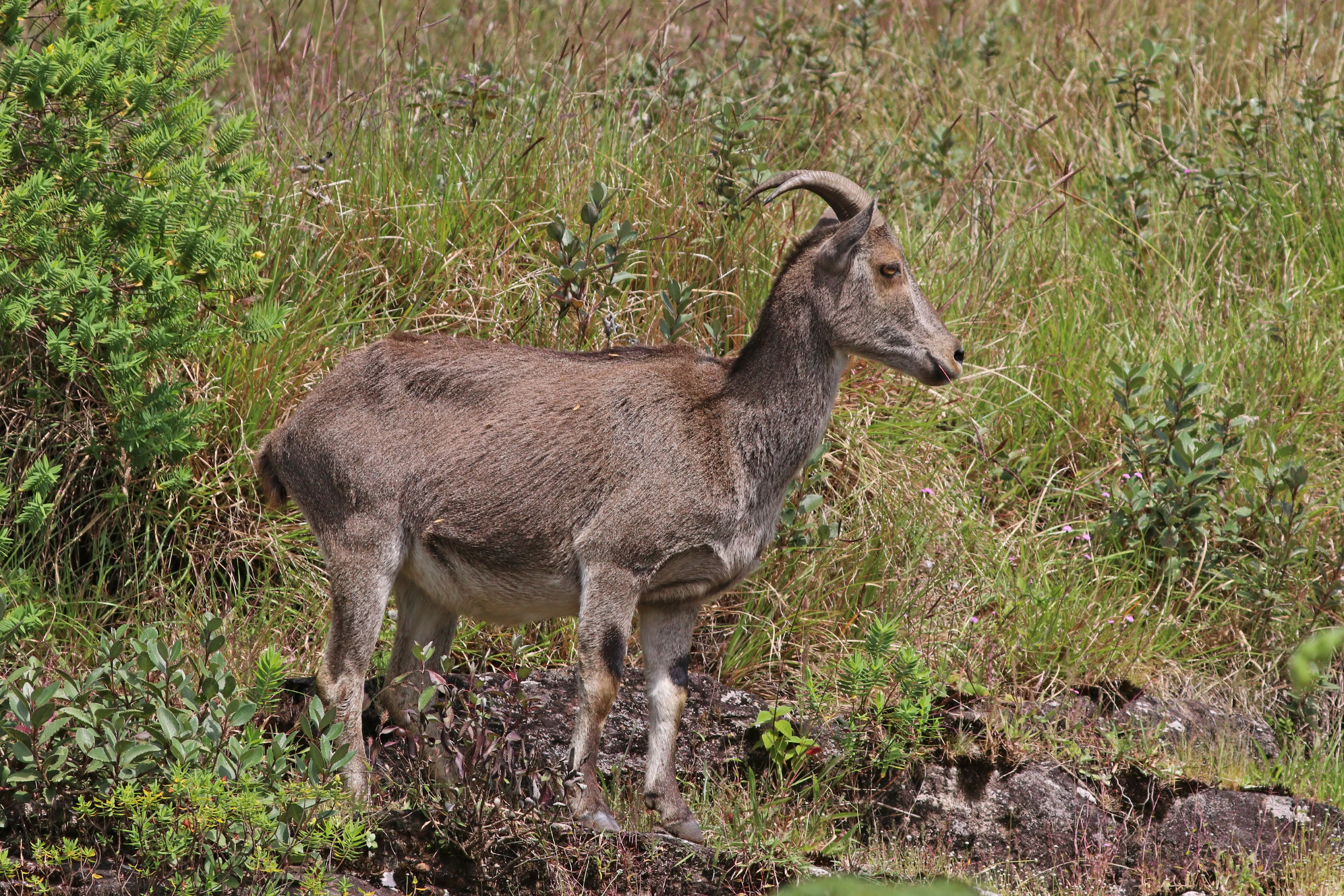
female

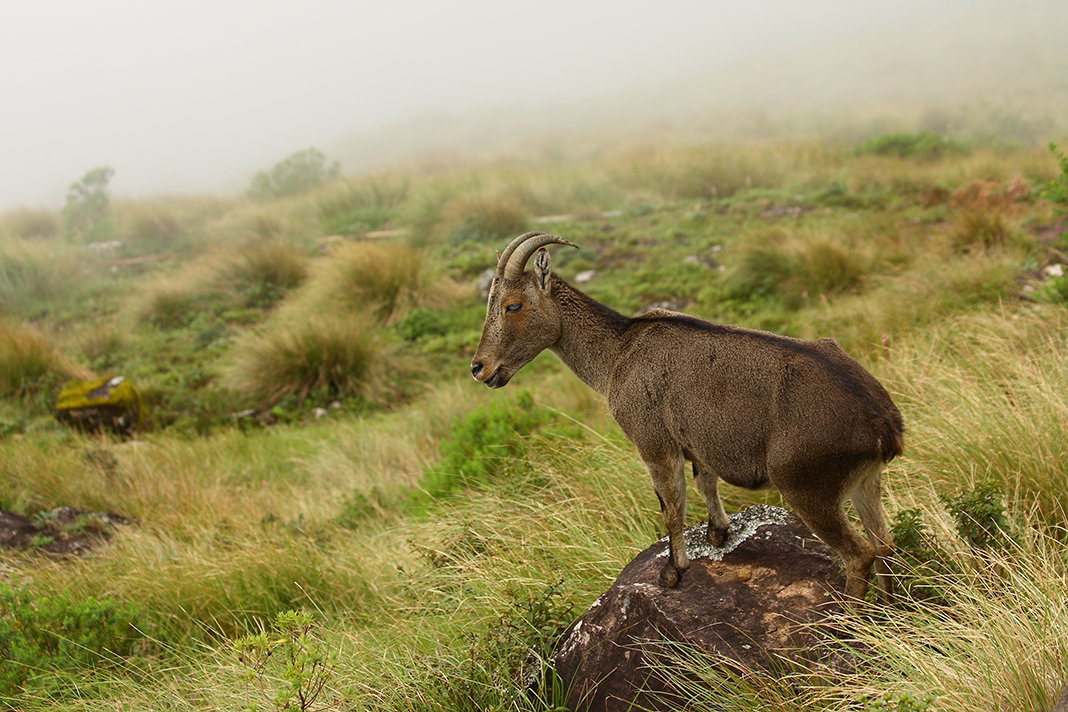
habitat

==== Genus: Tetracerus ====
===== Species: Tetracerus quadricornis (four-horned antelope / ഉല്ലമാൻ) =====
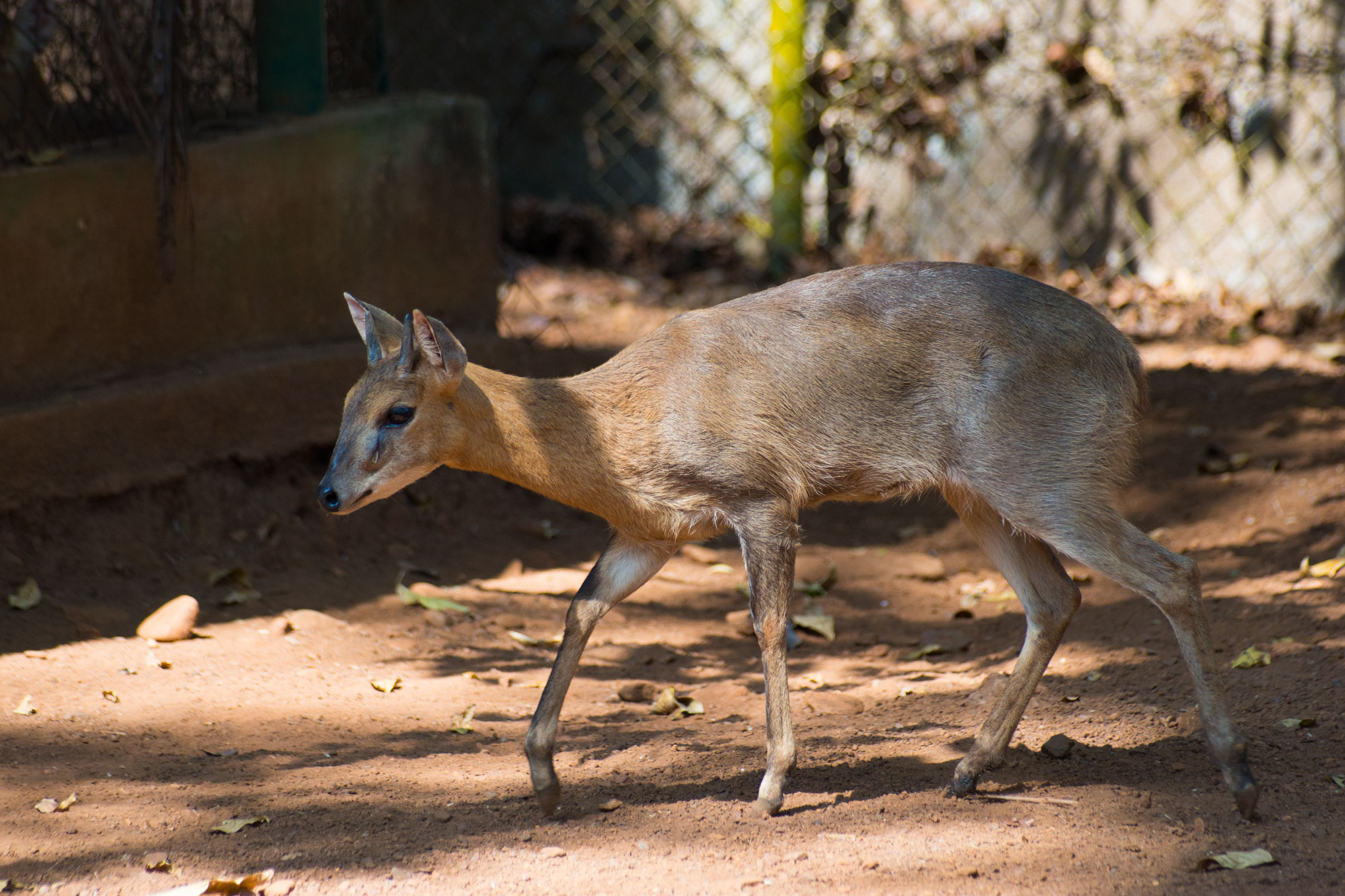
male

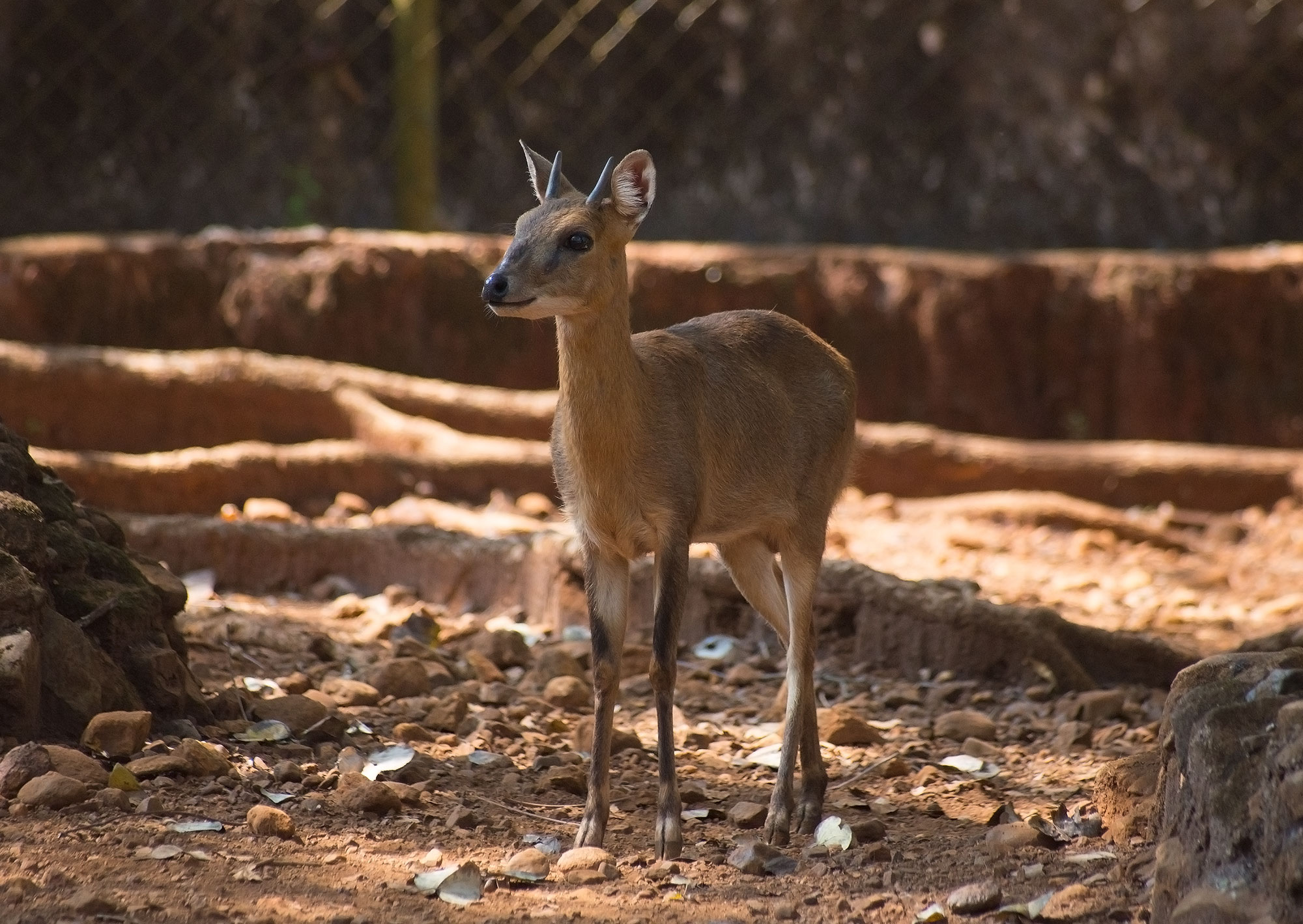
male

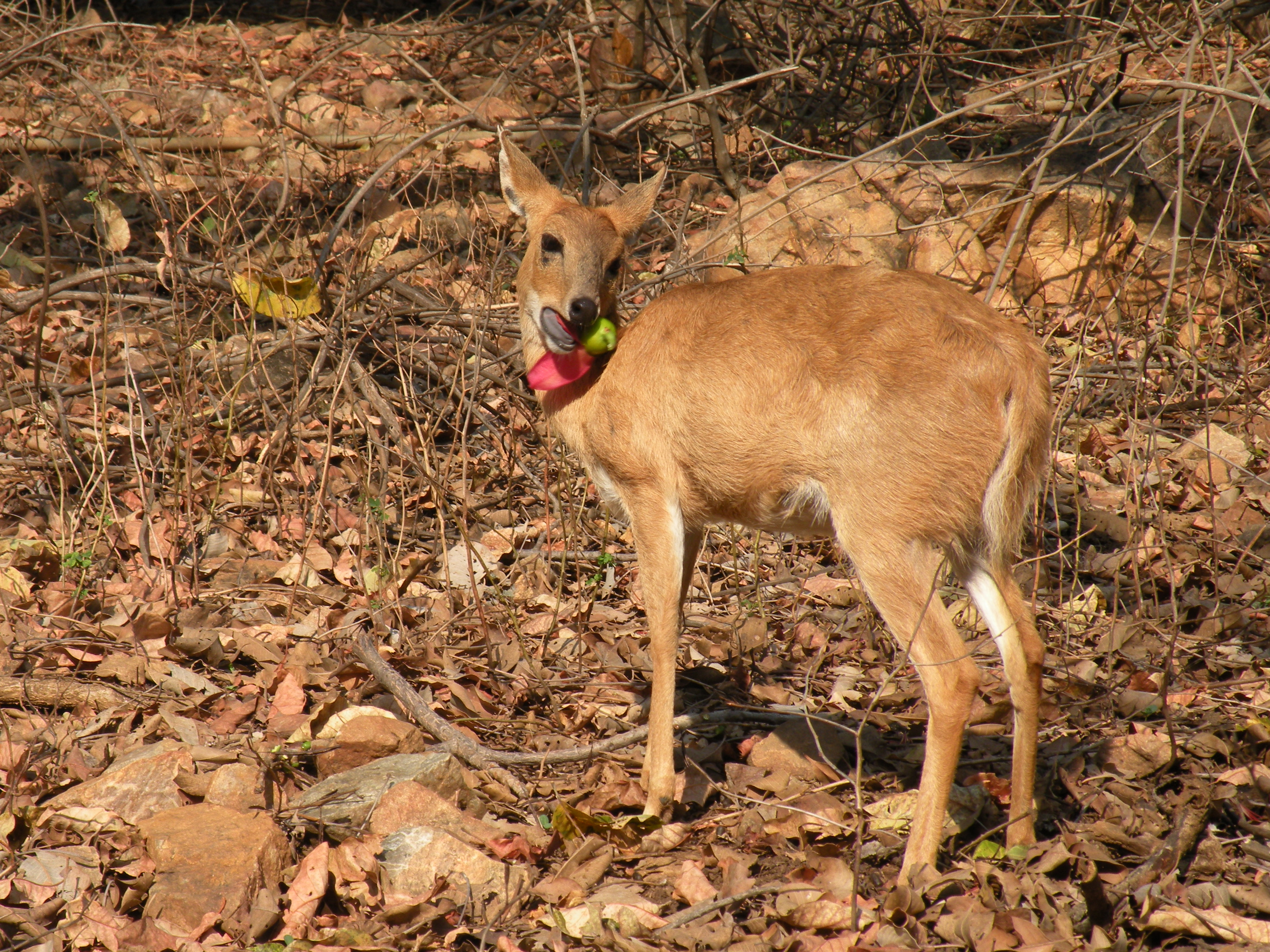
female

=== Family: Cervidae ===
==== Genus: Axis ====
===== Species: Axis axis (chital / പുള്ളിമാൻ) =====
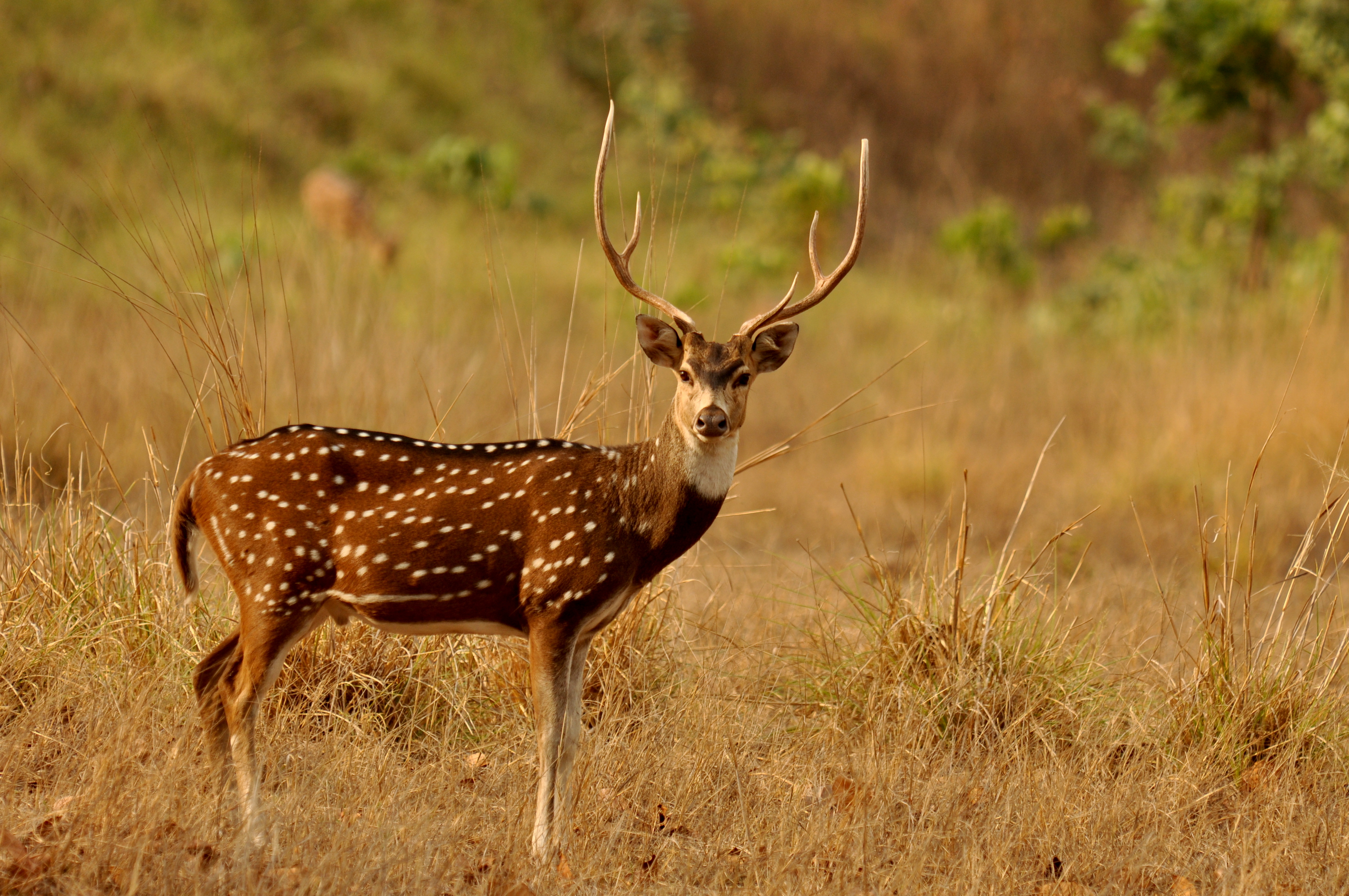
male

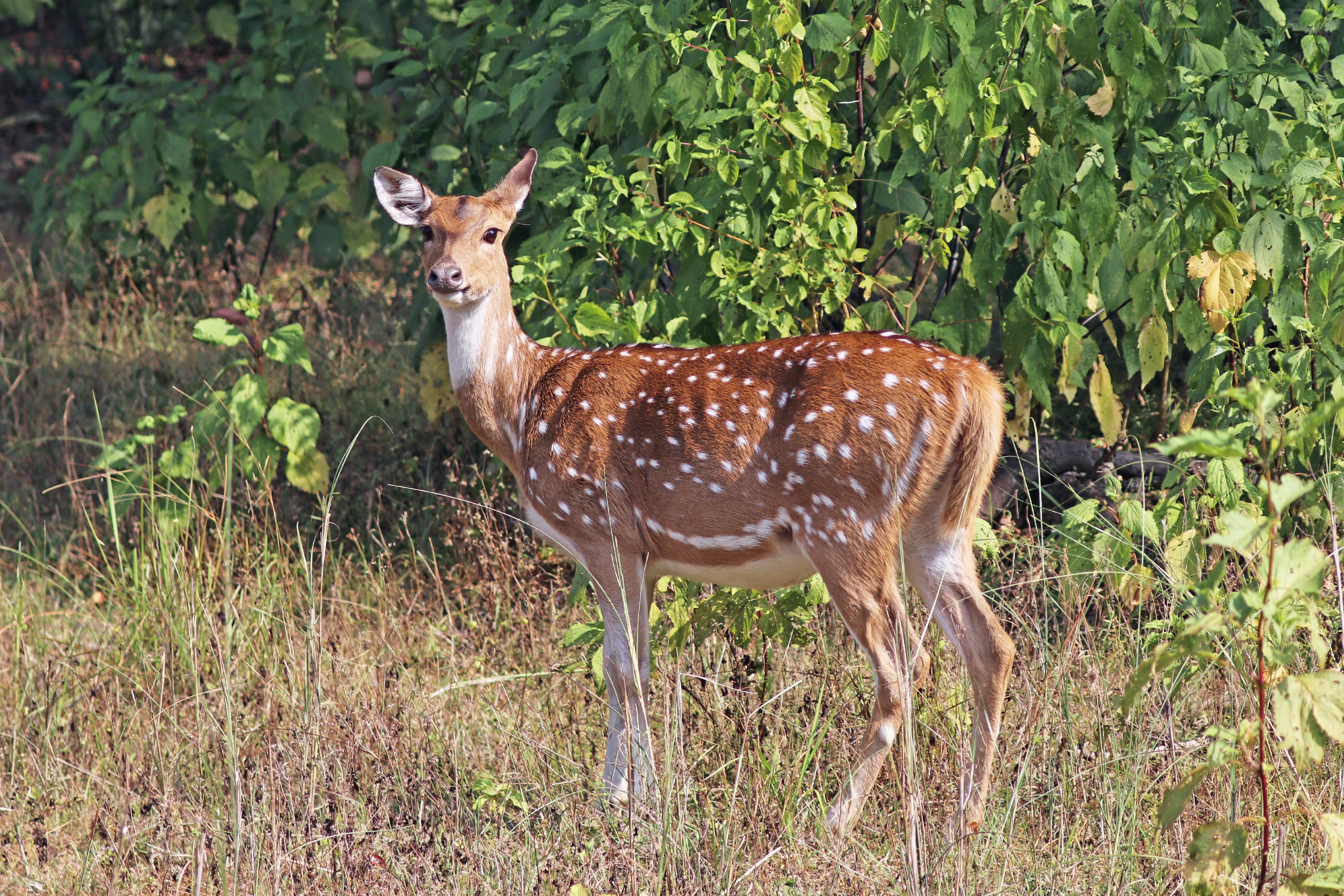
female

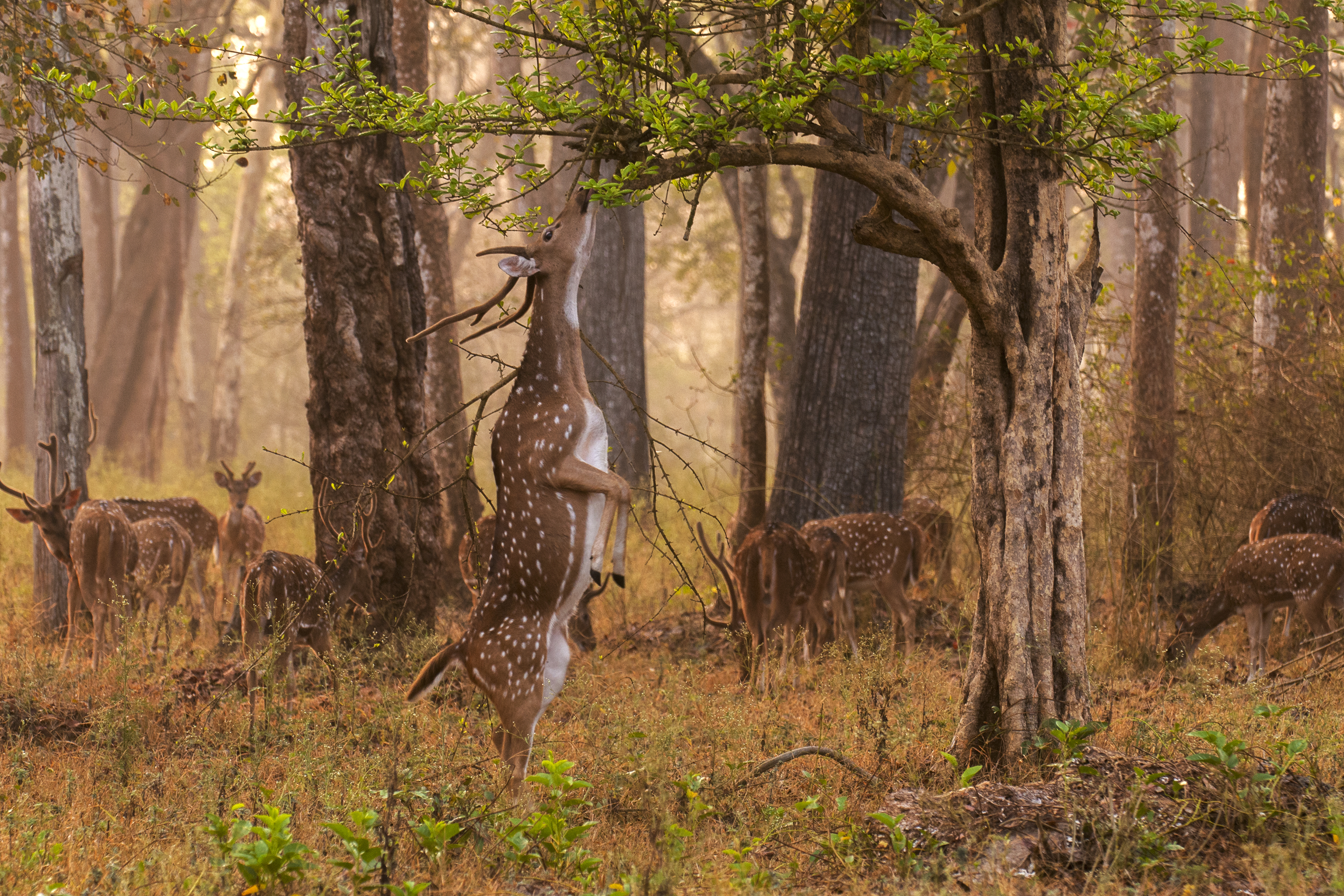
male

==== Genus: Muntiacus ====
===== Species: Muntiacus muntjak (Indian muntjac / കേഴമാൻ) =====
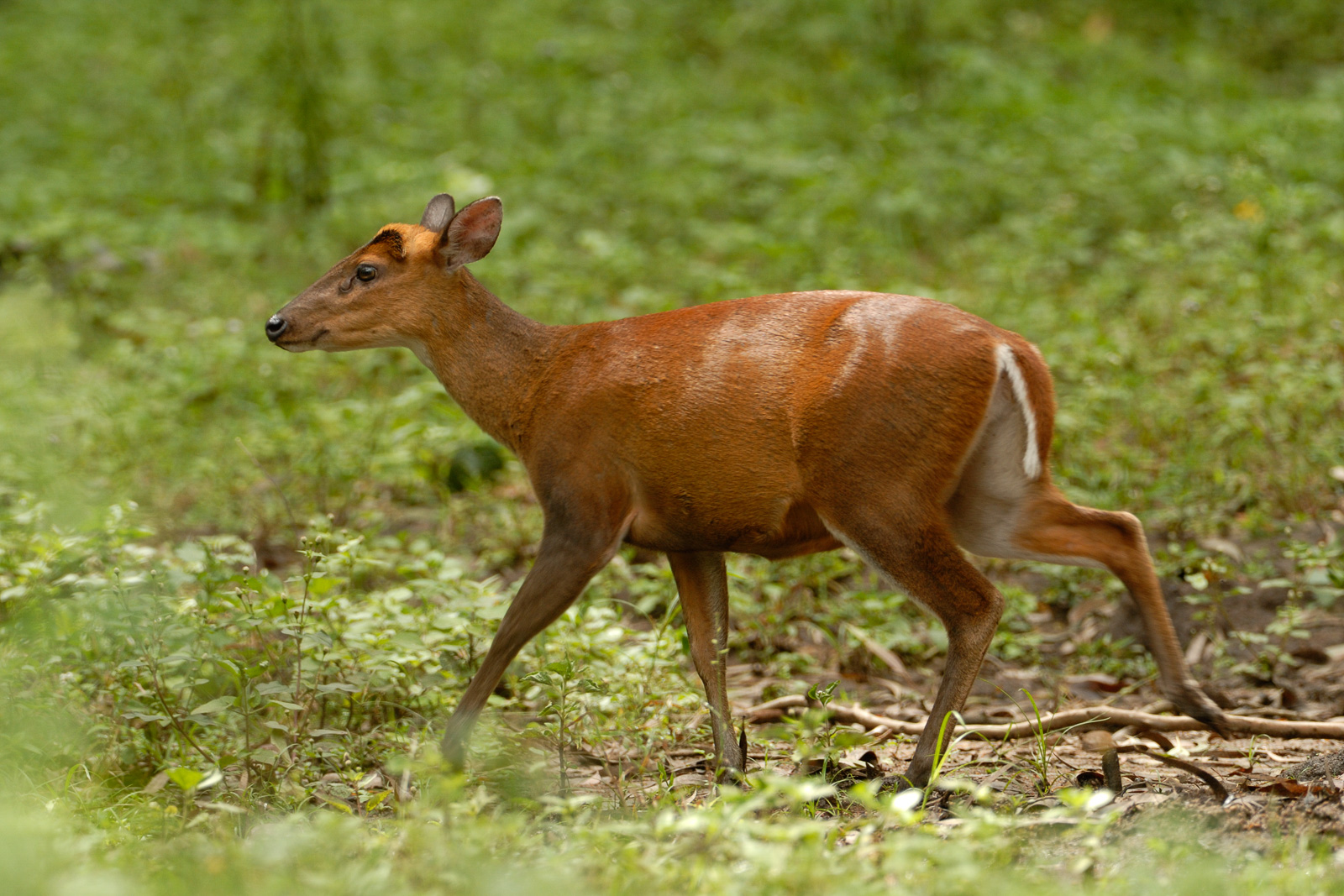

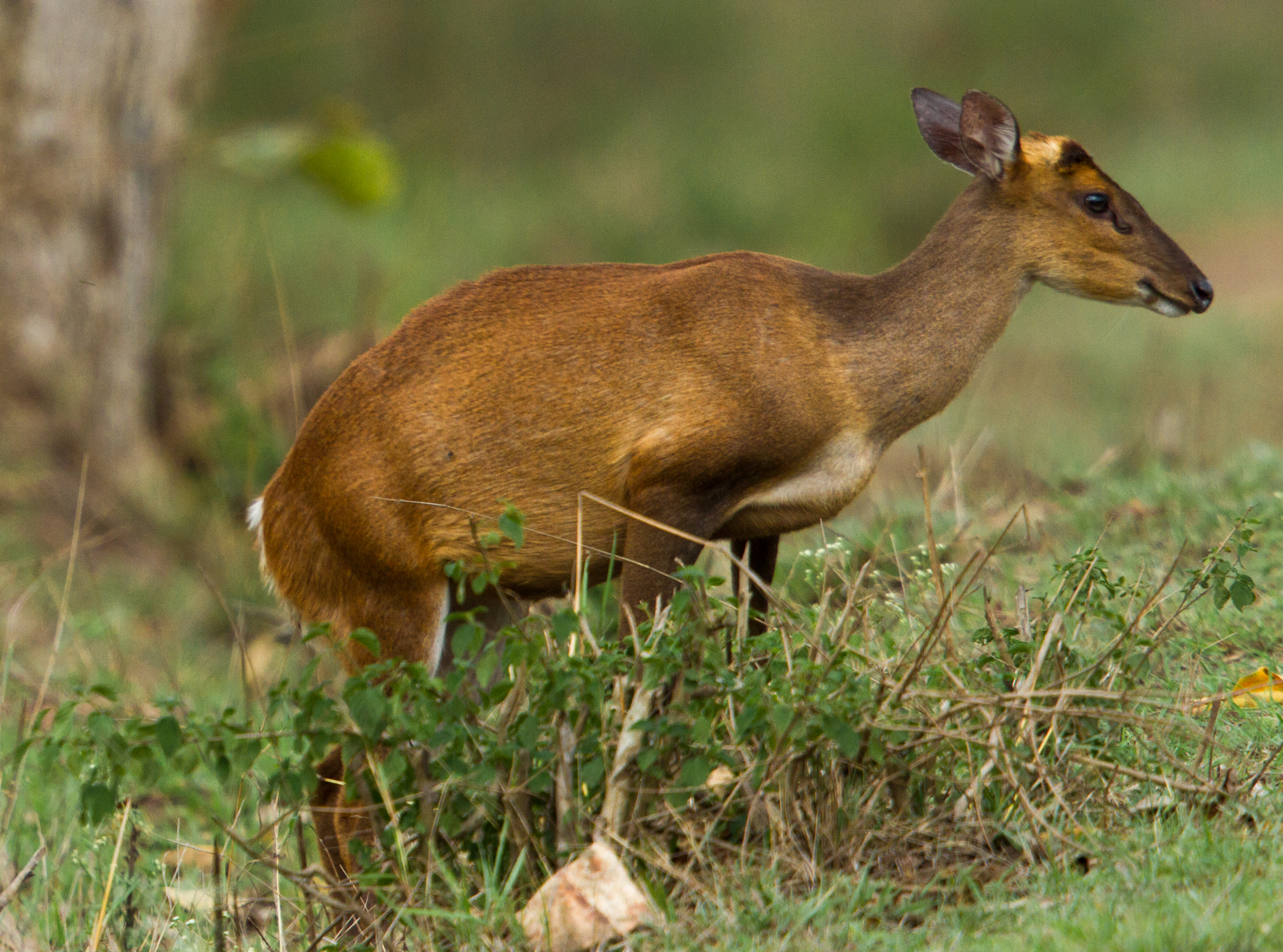

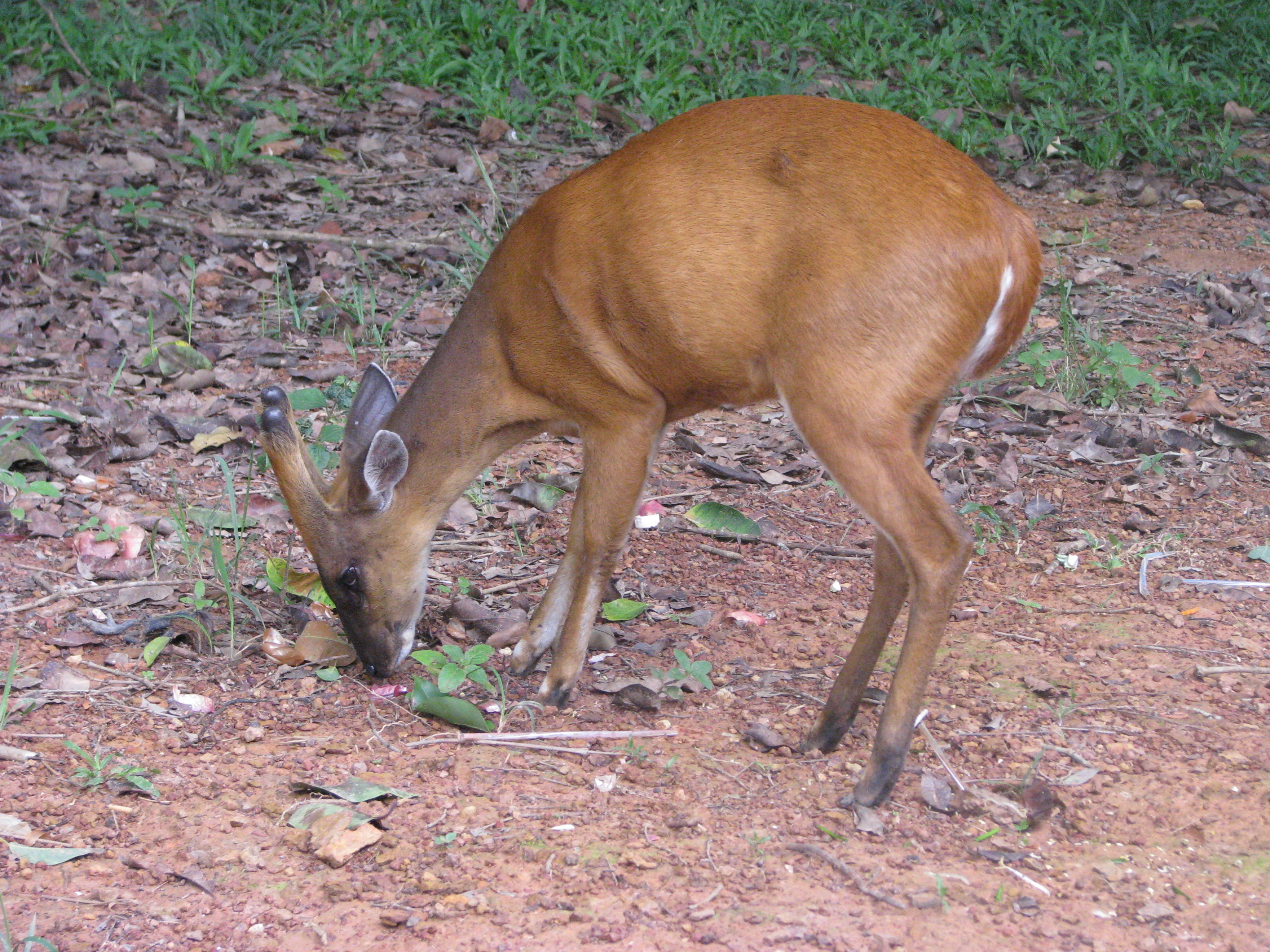

==== Genus: Rusa ====
===== Species: Rusa unicolor (sambar deer / മ്ലാവ്) =====
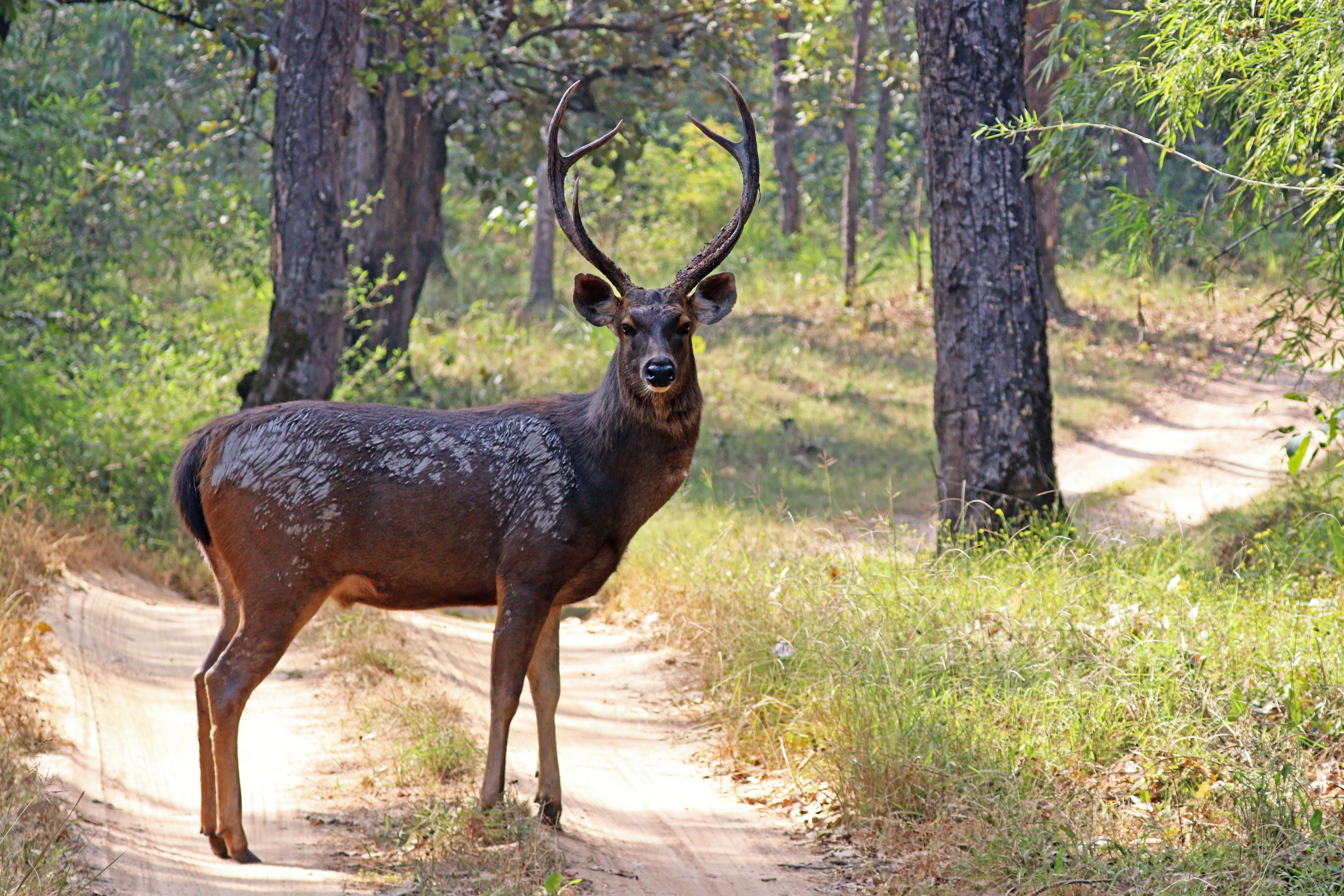
male

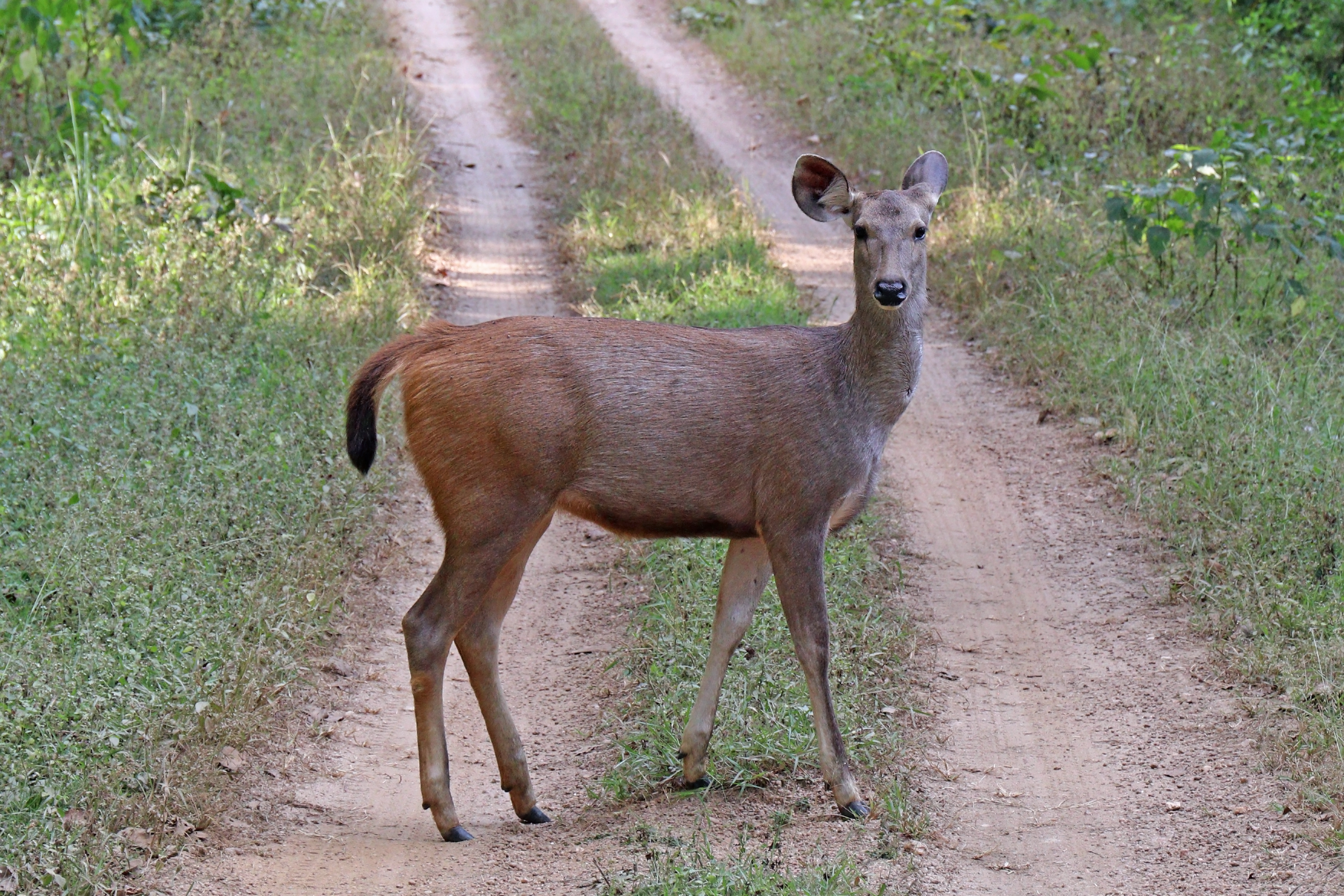
female

=== Family: Suidae ===
==== Genus: Sus ====
===== Species: Sus scrofa cristatus (Indian boar / കാട്ടുപന്നി) =====
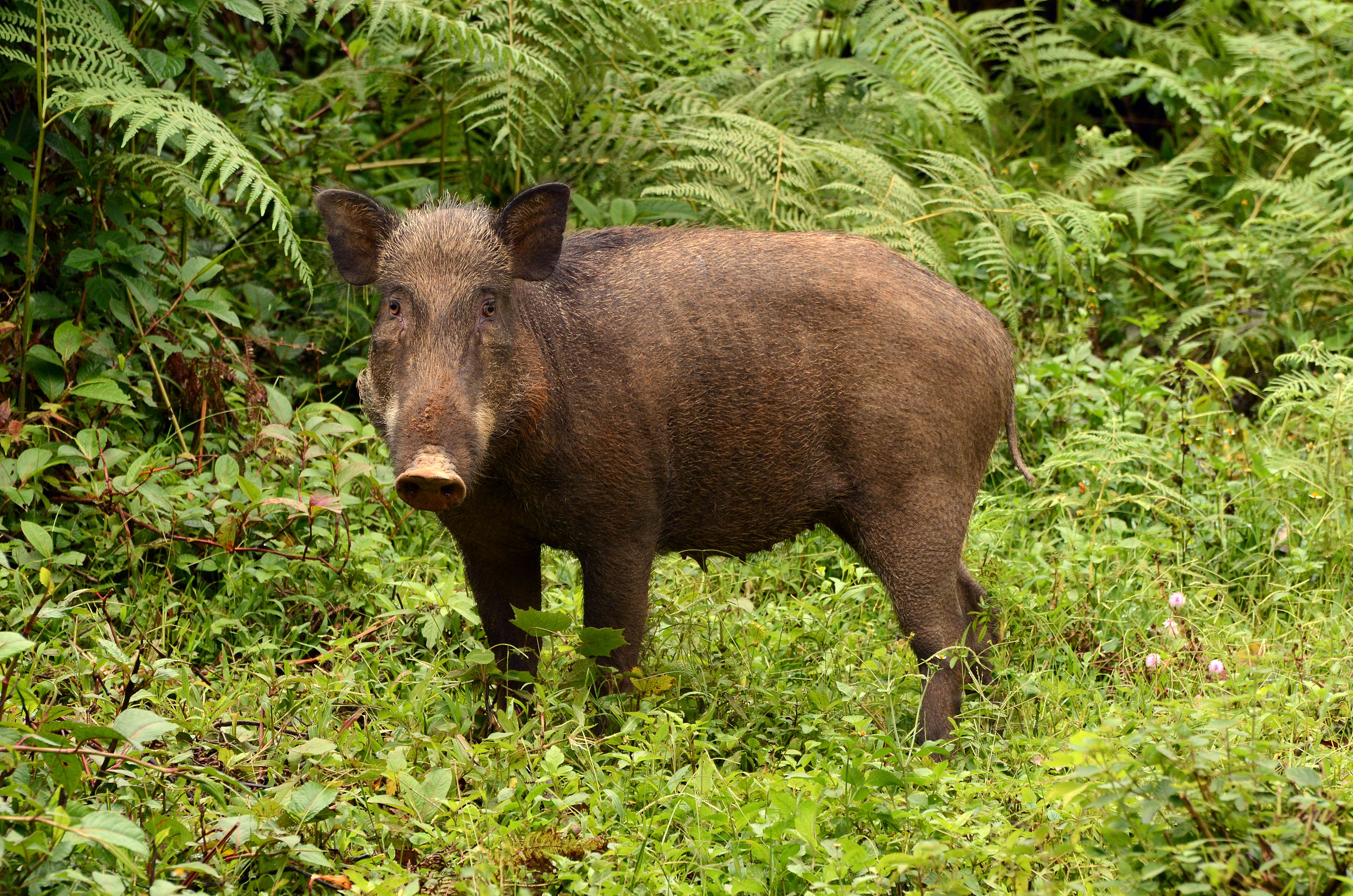

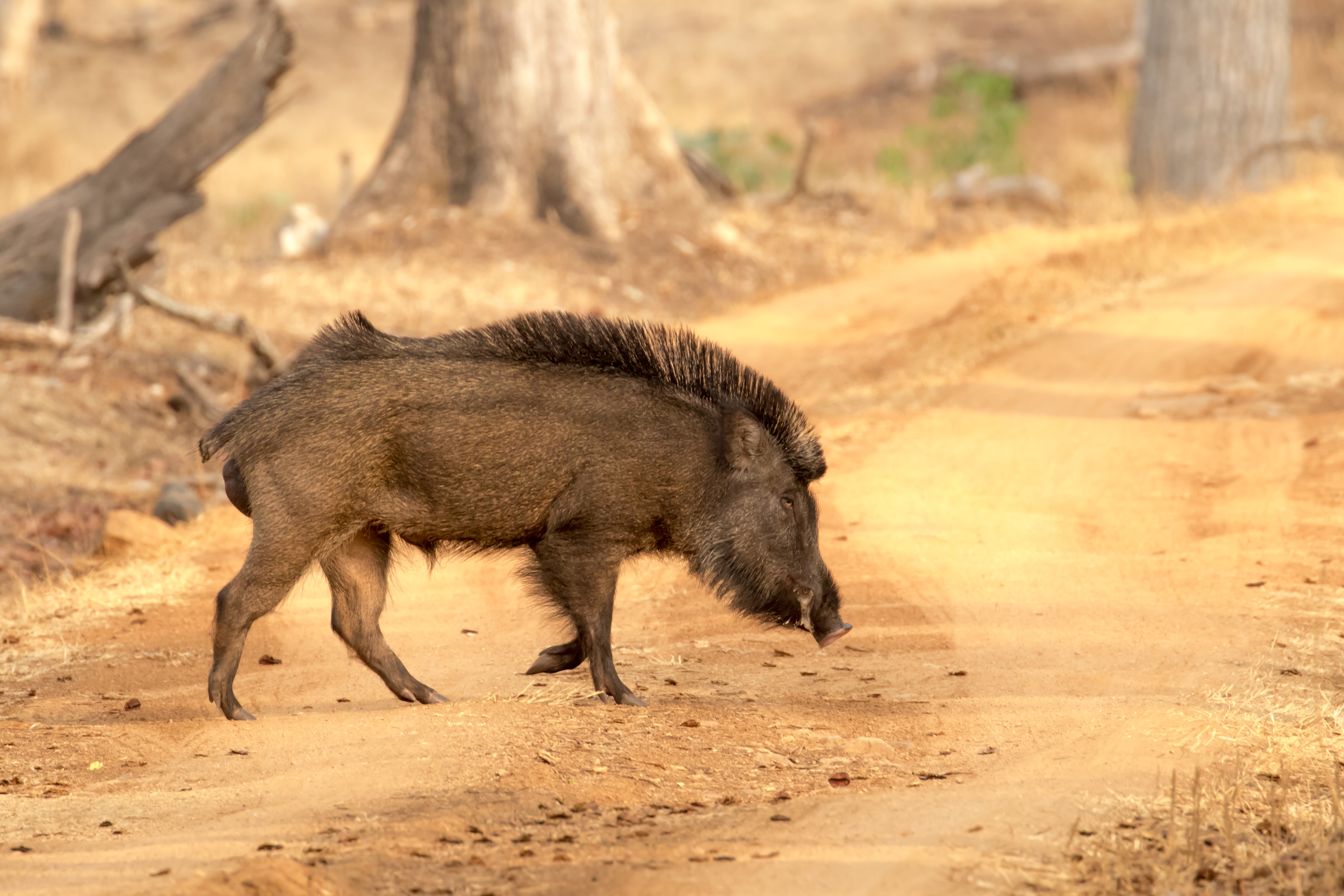

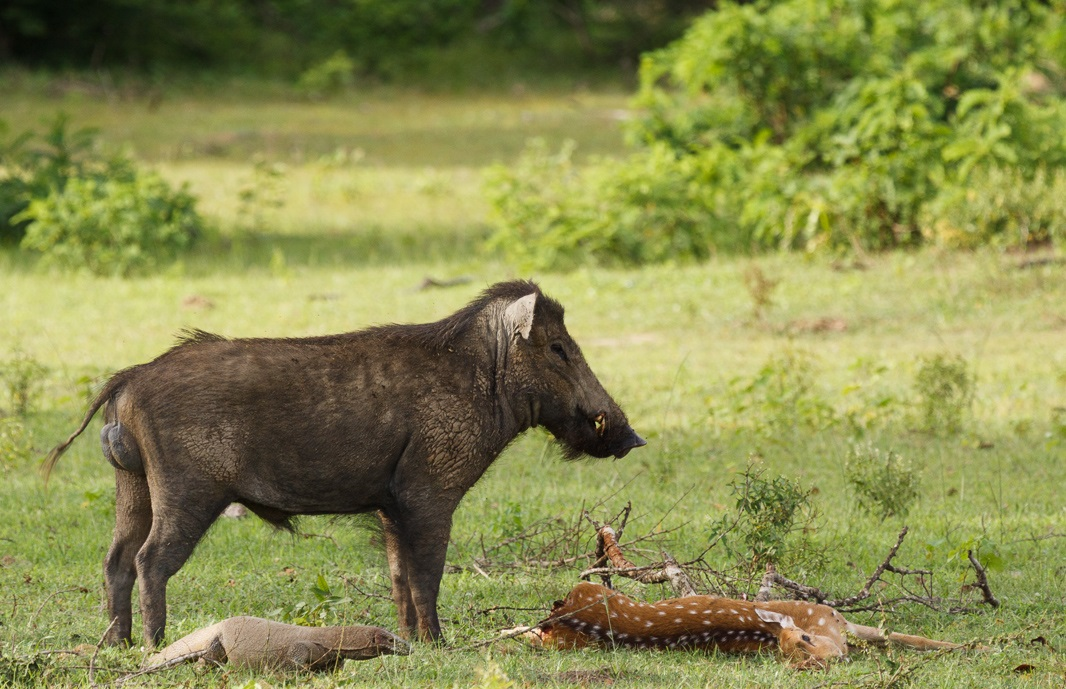

=== Family: Tragulidae ===
==== Genus: Moschiola ====
===== Species: Moschiola indica (Indian spotted chevrotain / കൂരമാൻ) =====
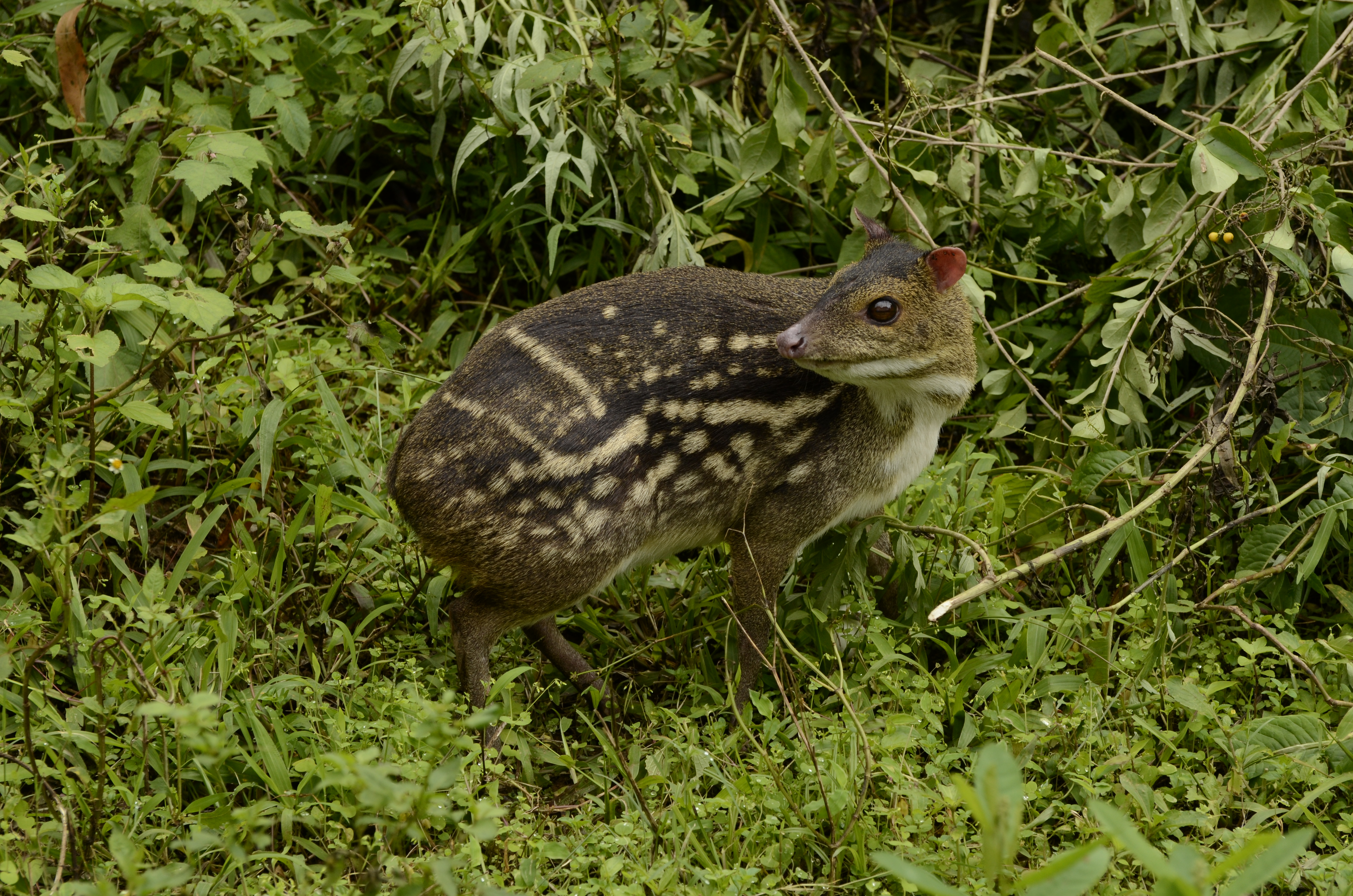

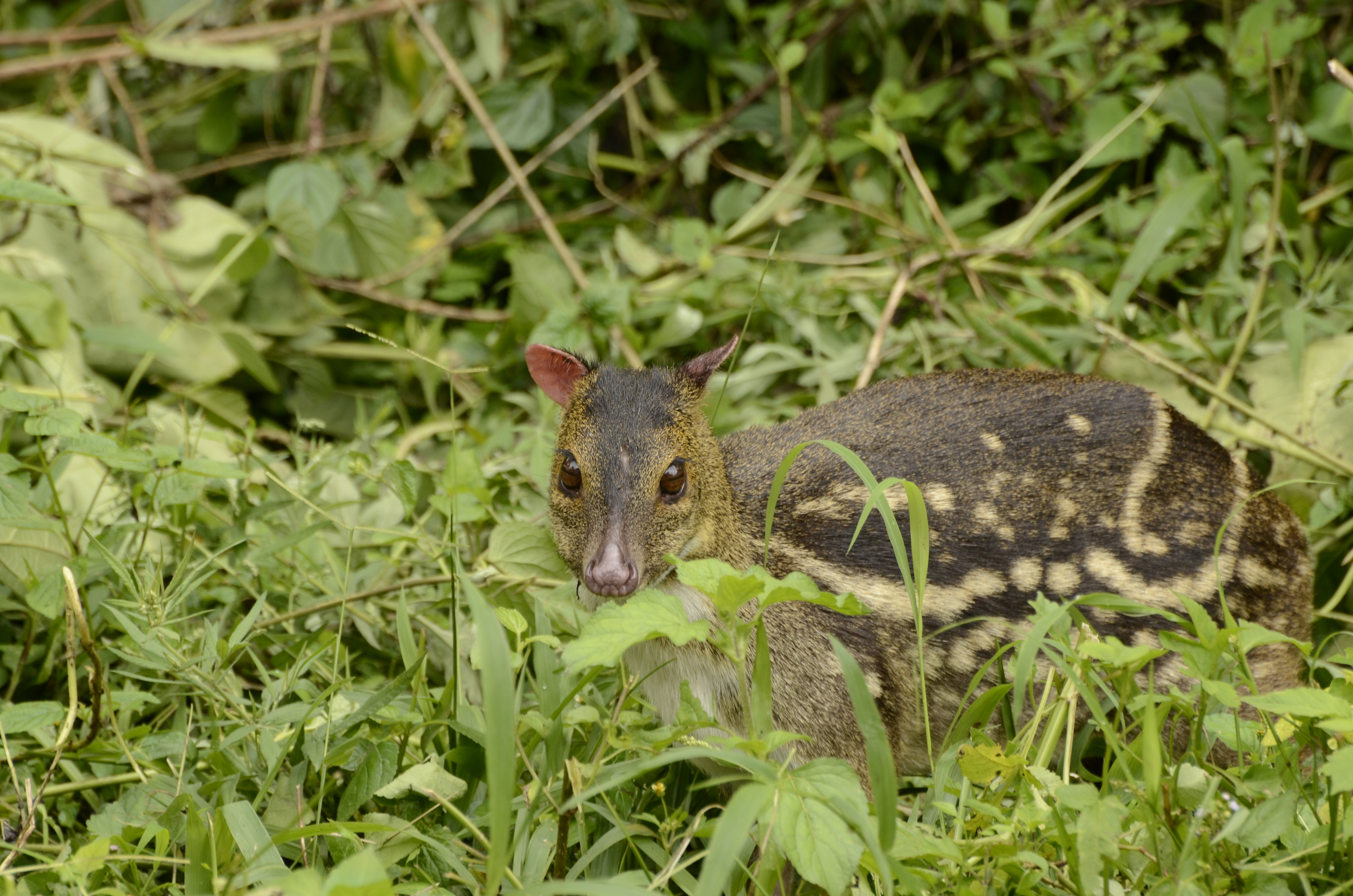

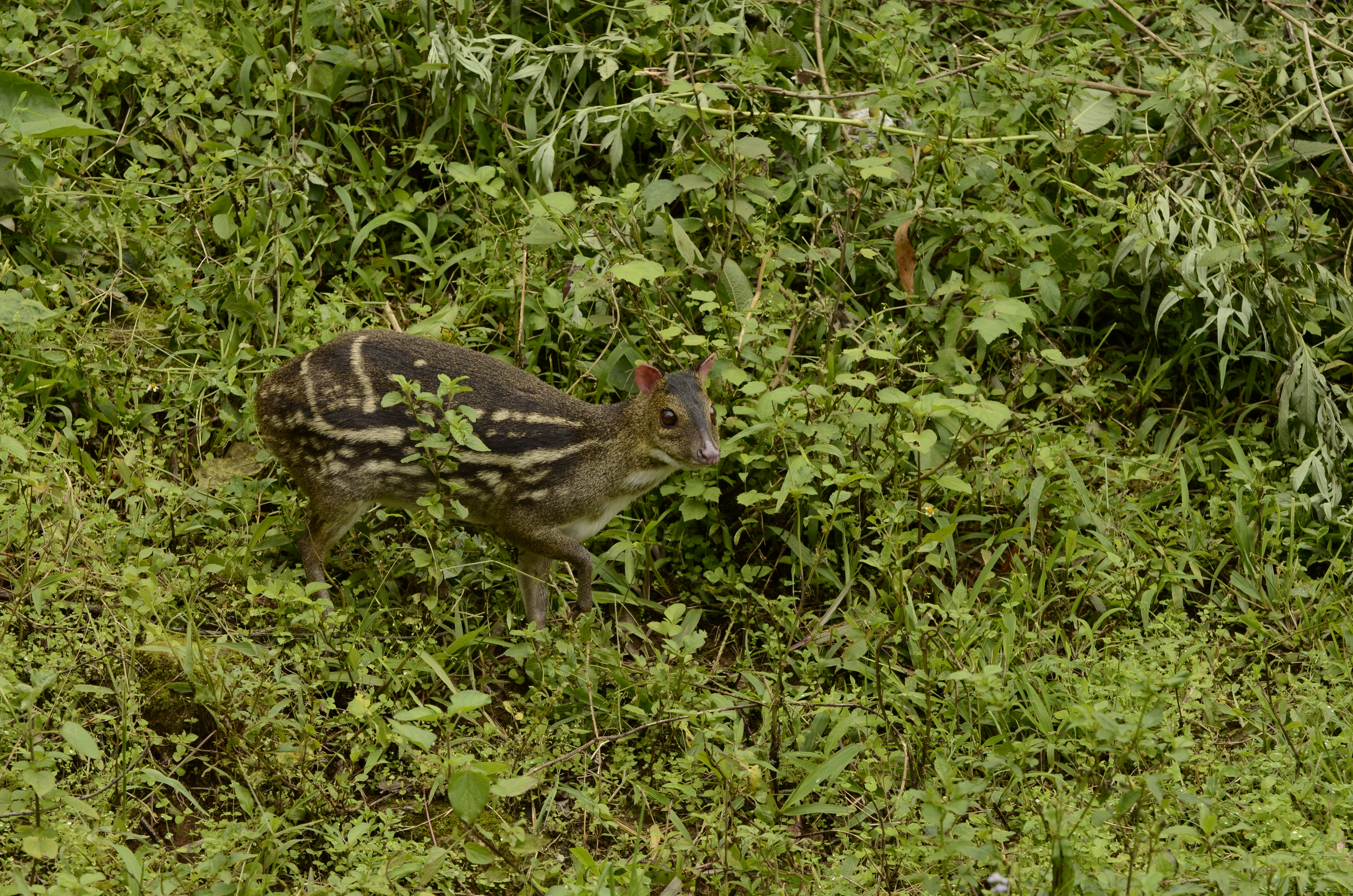

== Order: Carnivora ==
=== Family: Canidae ===
==== Genus: Canis ====
===== Species: Canis aureus naria (Sri Lankan jackal / കുറുനരി ) =====
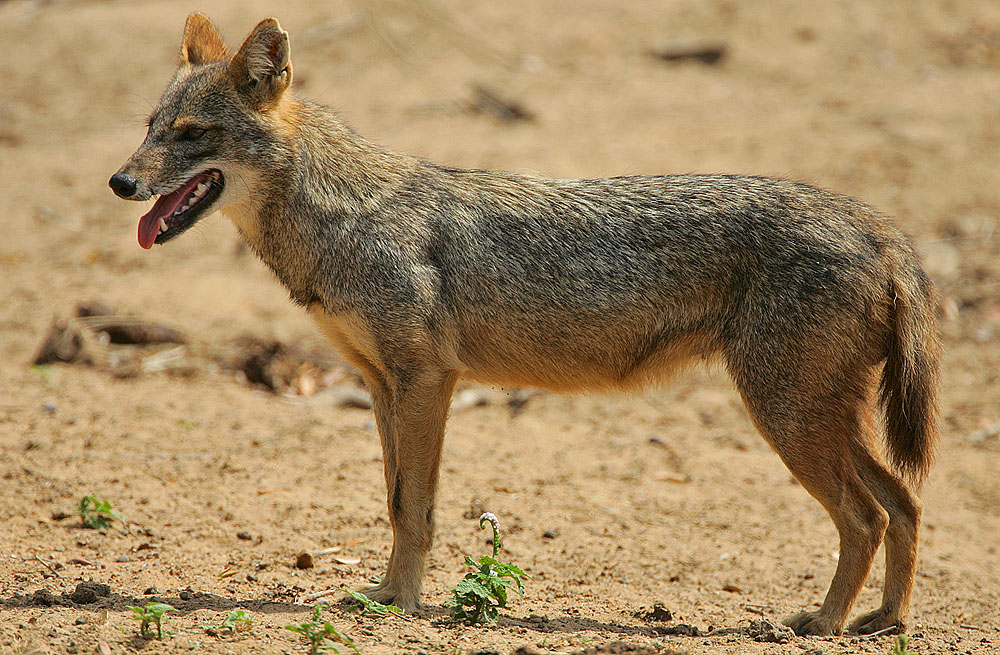

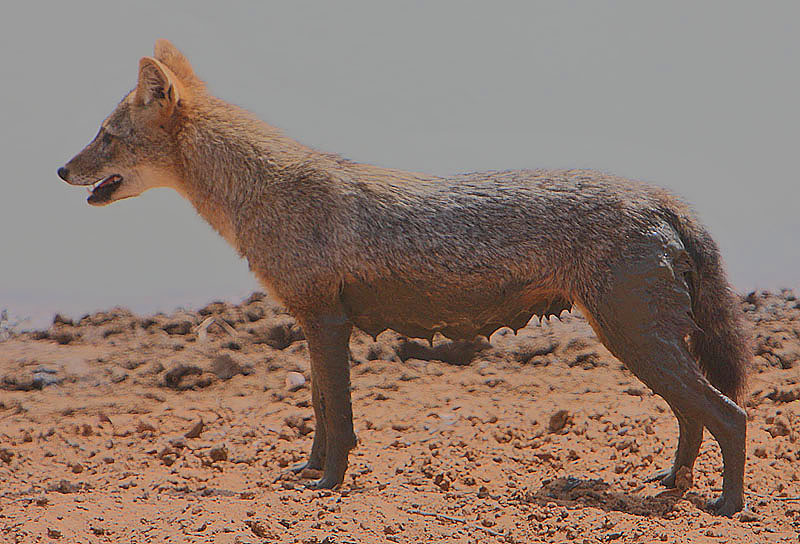

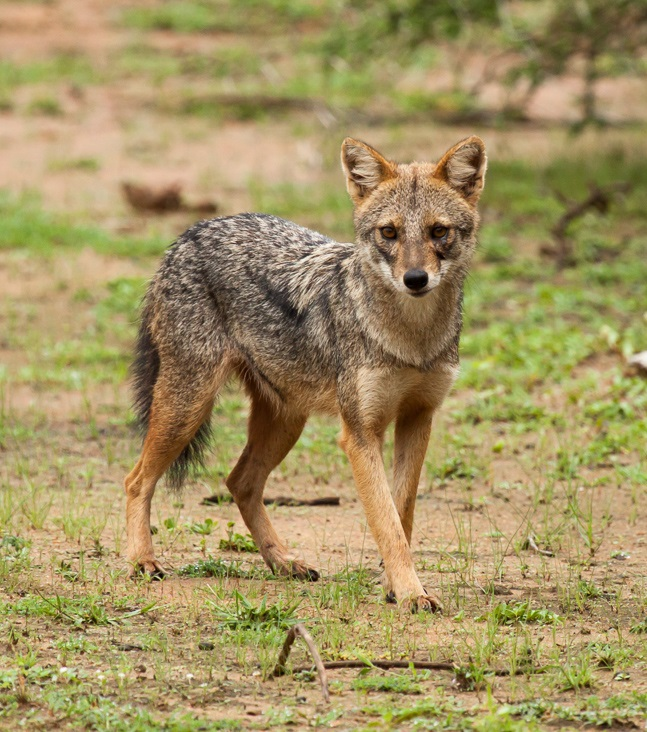

==== Genus: Cuon ====
===== Species: Cuon alpinus (dhole / ചെന്നായ) =====
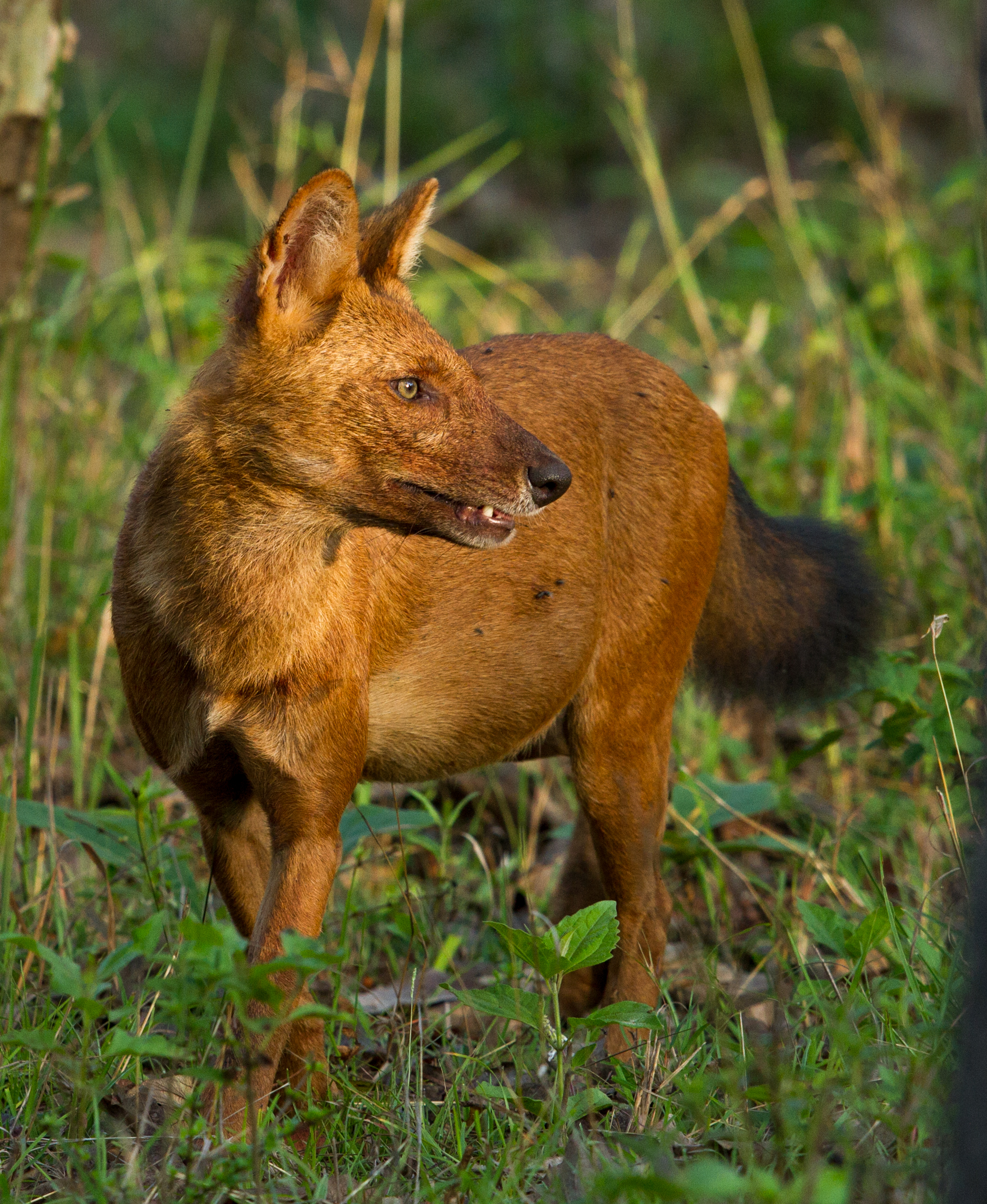

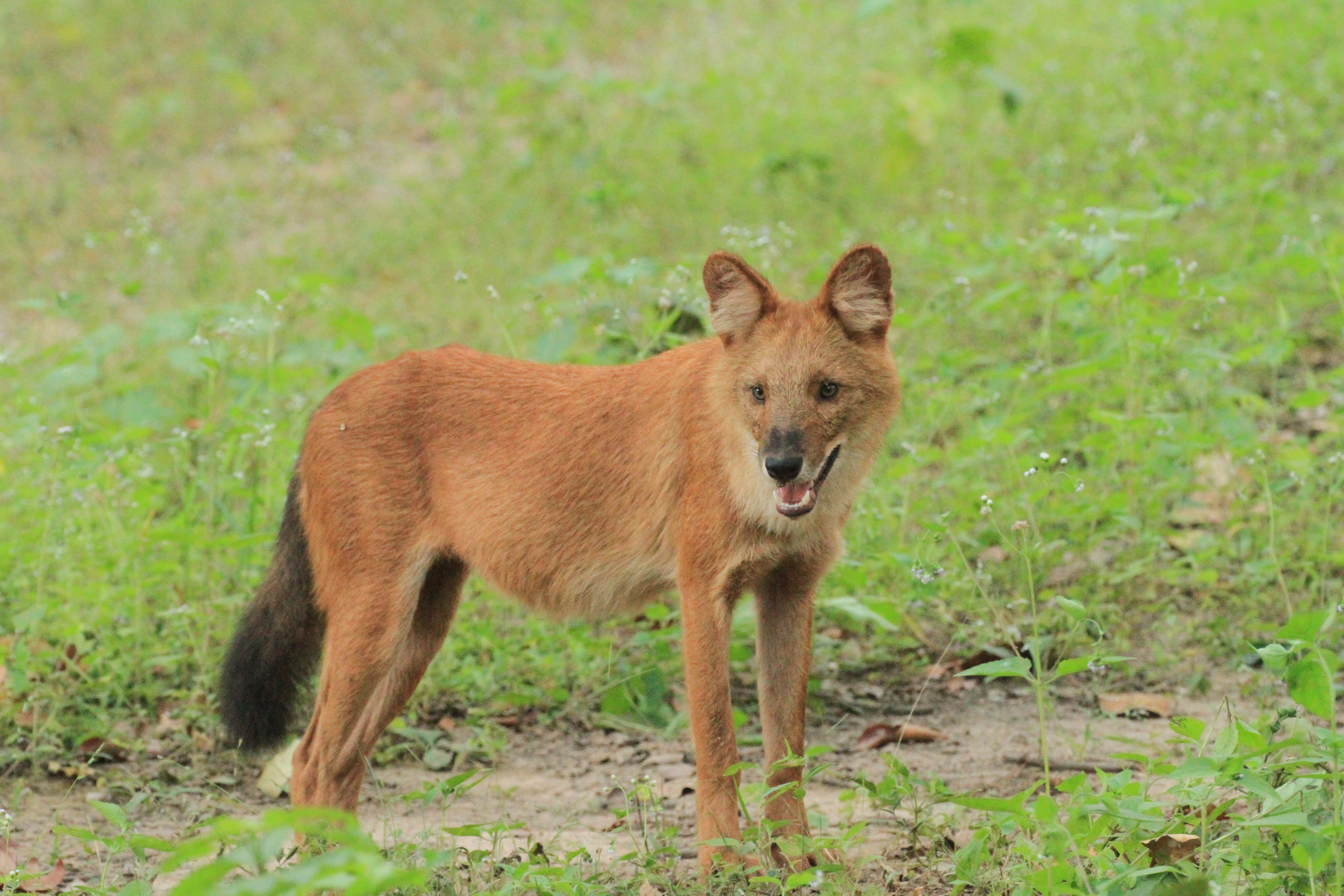

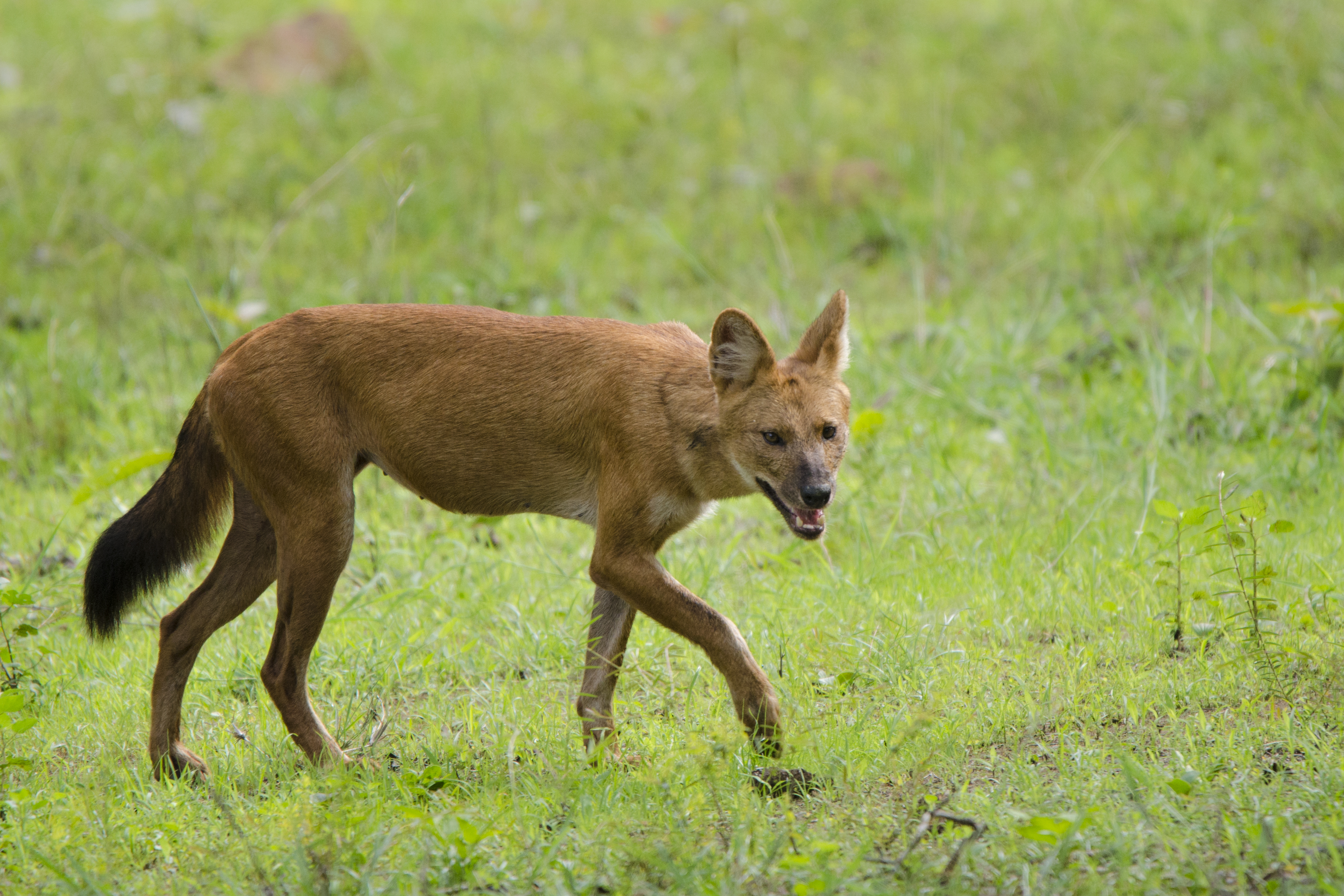

==== Genus: Vulpes ====
===== Species: Vulpes bengalensis (Bengal fox / കുറുക്കൻ) =====
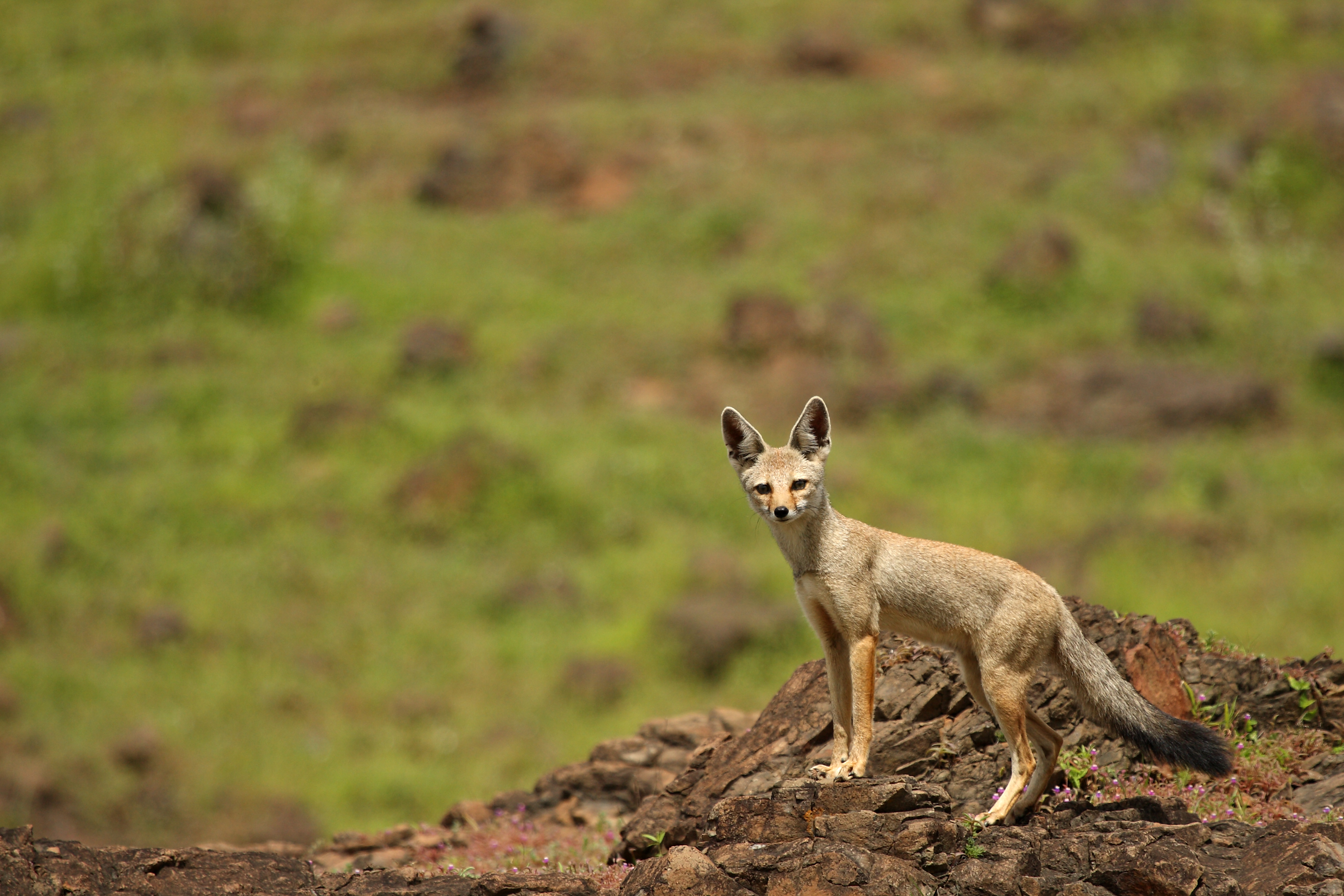

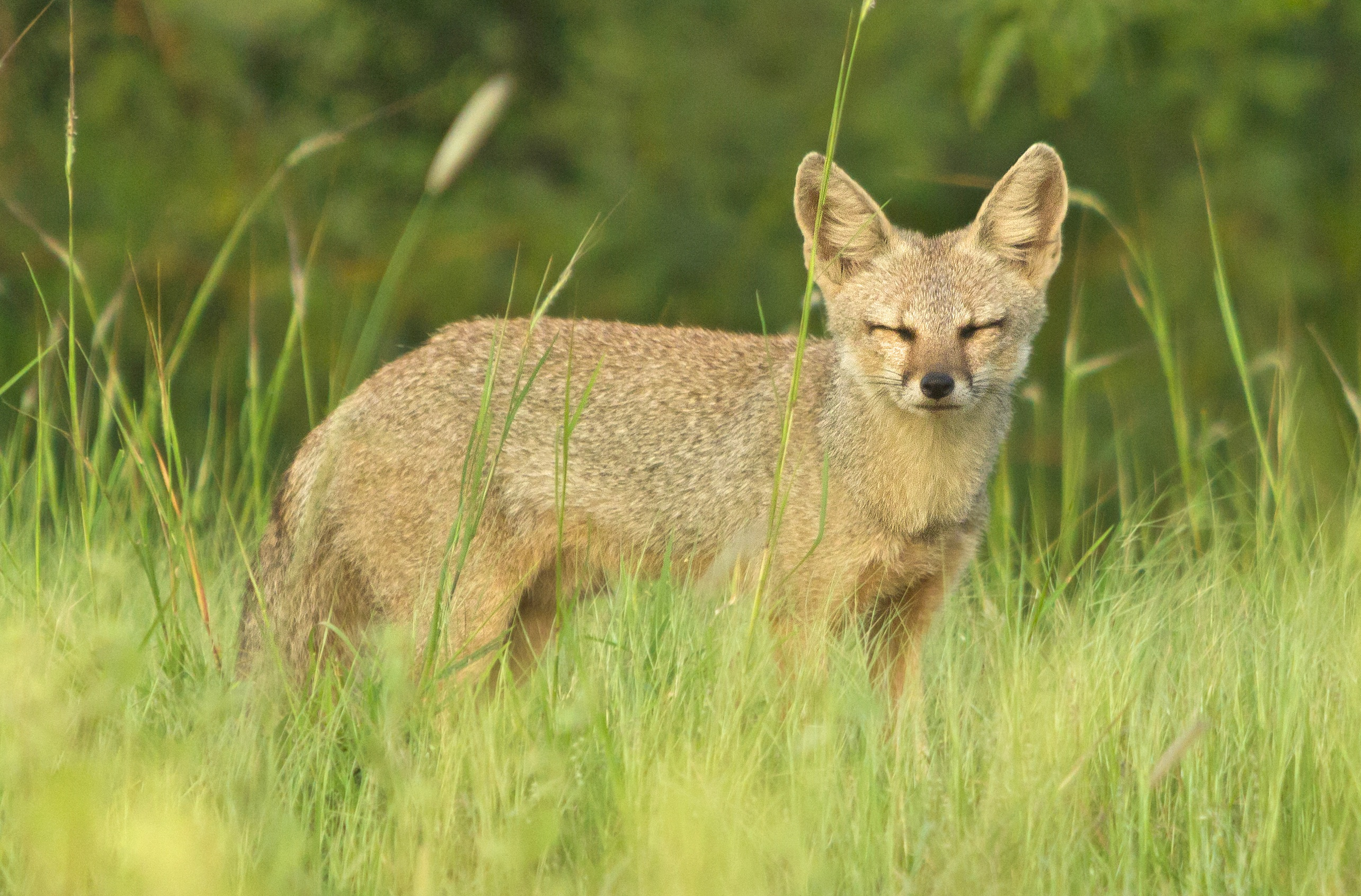

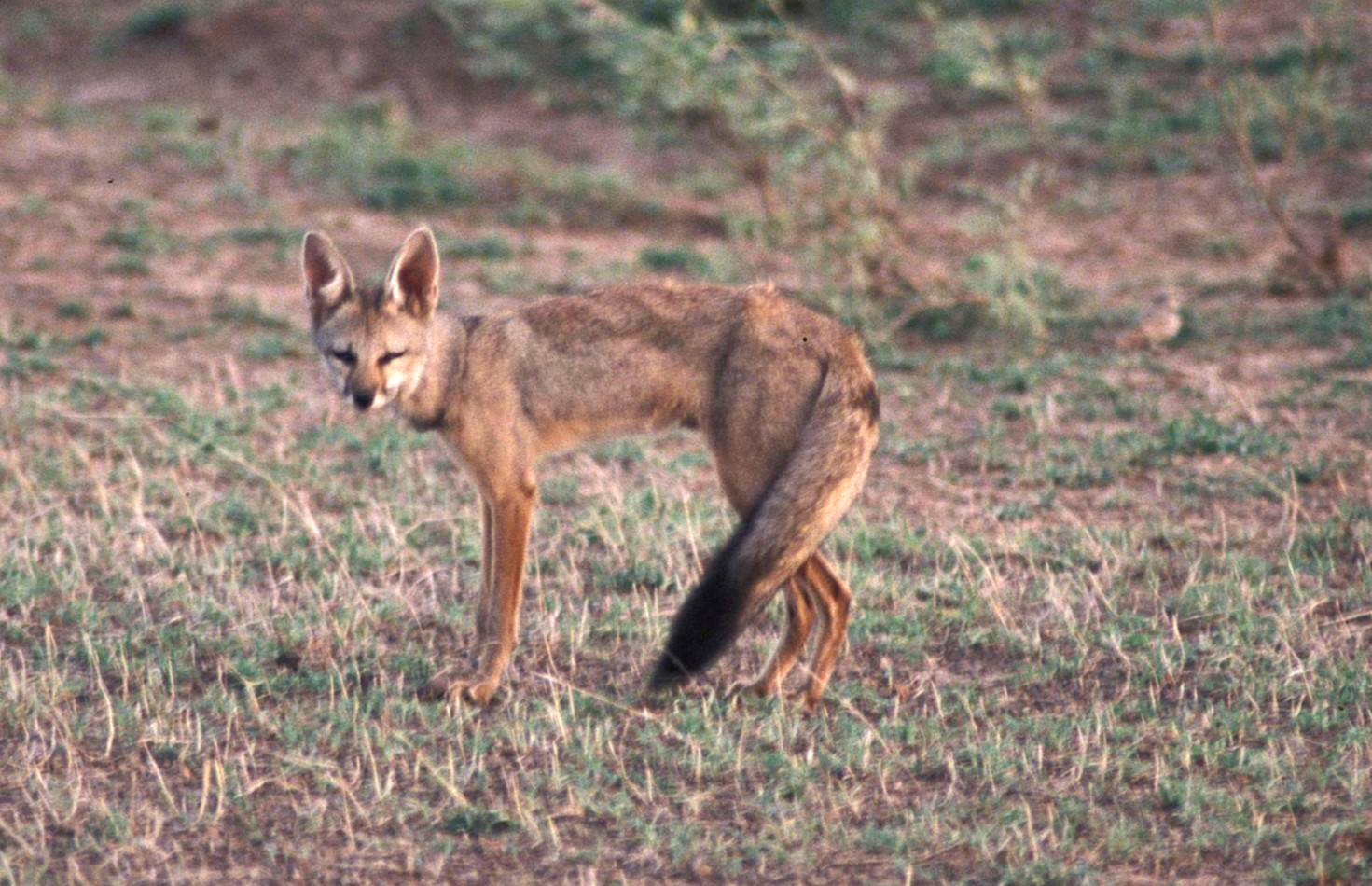

=== Family: Felidae ===
==== Genus: Felis ====
===== Species: Felis chaus (jungle cat / കാട്ടുമാക്കാൻ / കാട്ടുപൂച്ച) =====
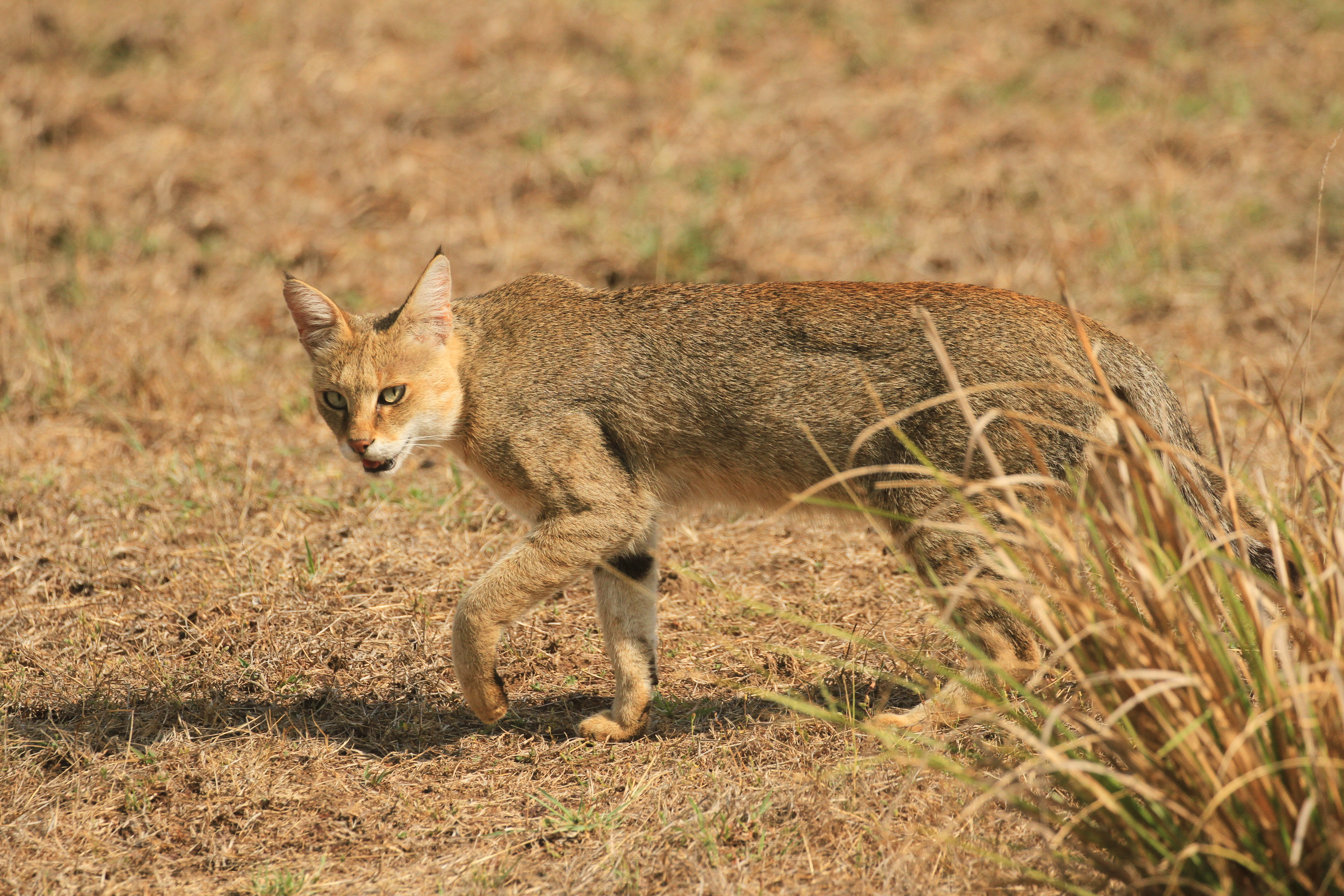

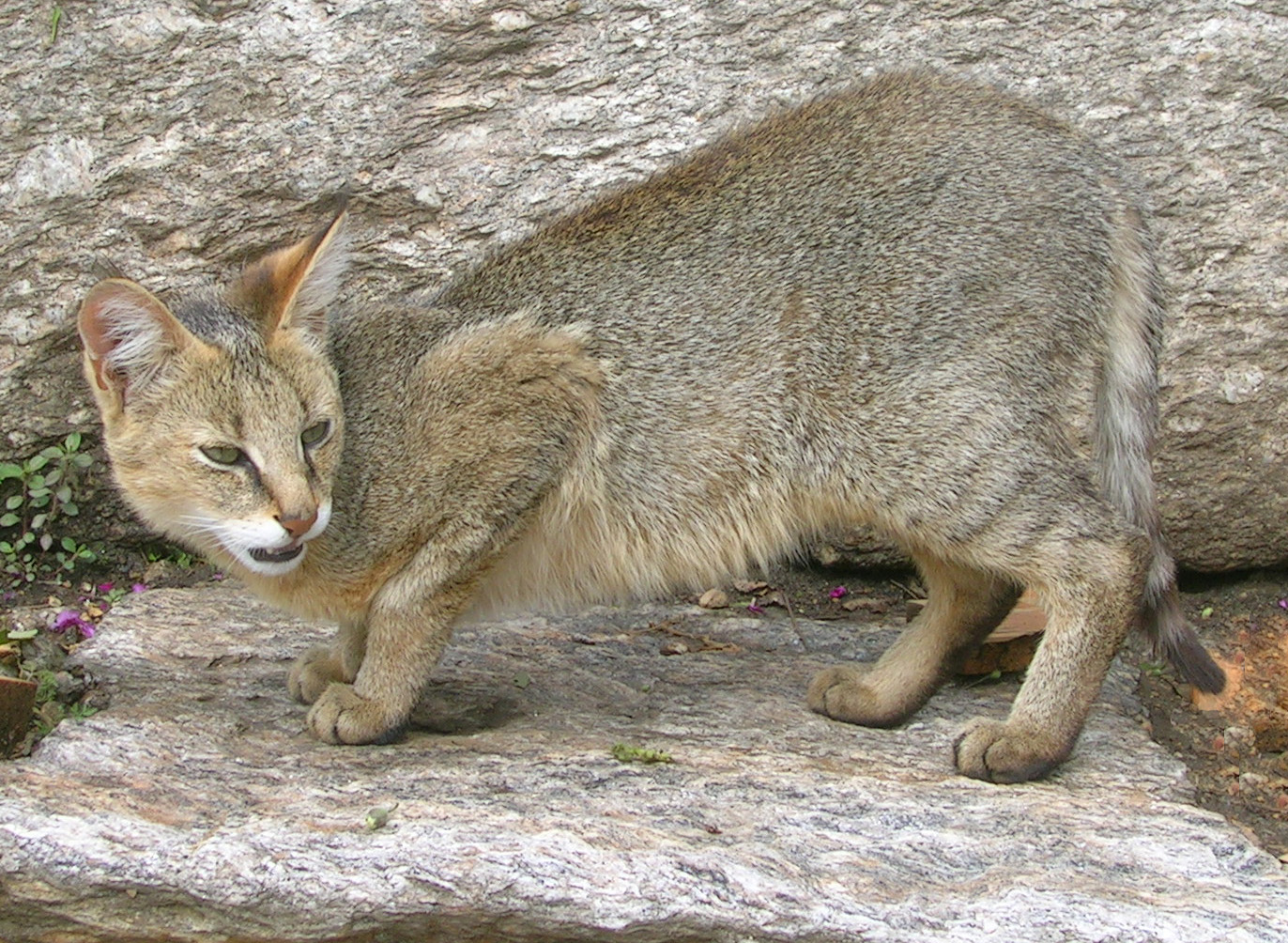

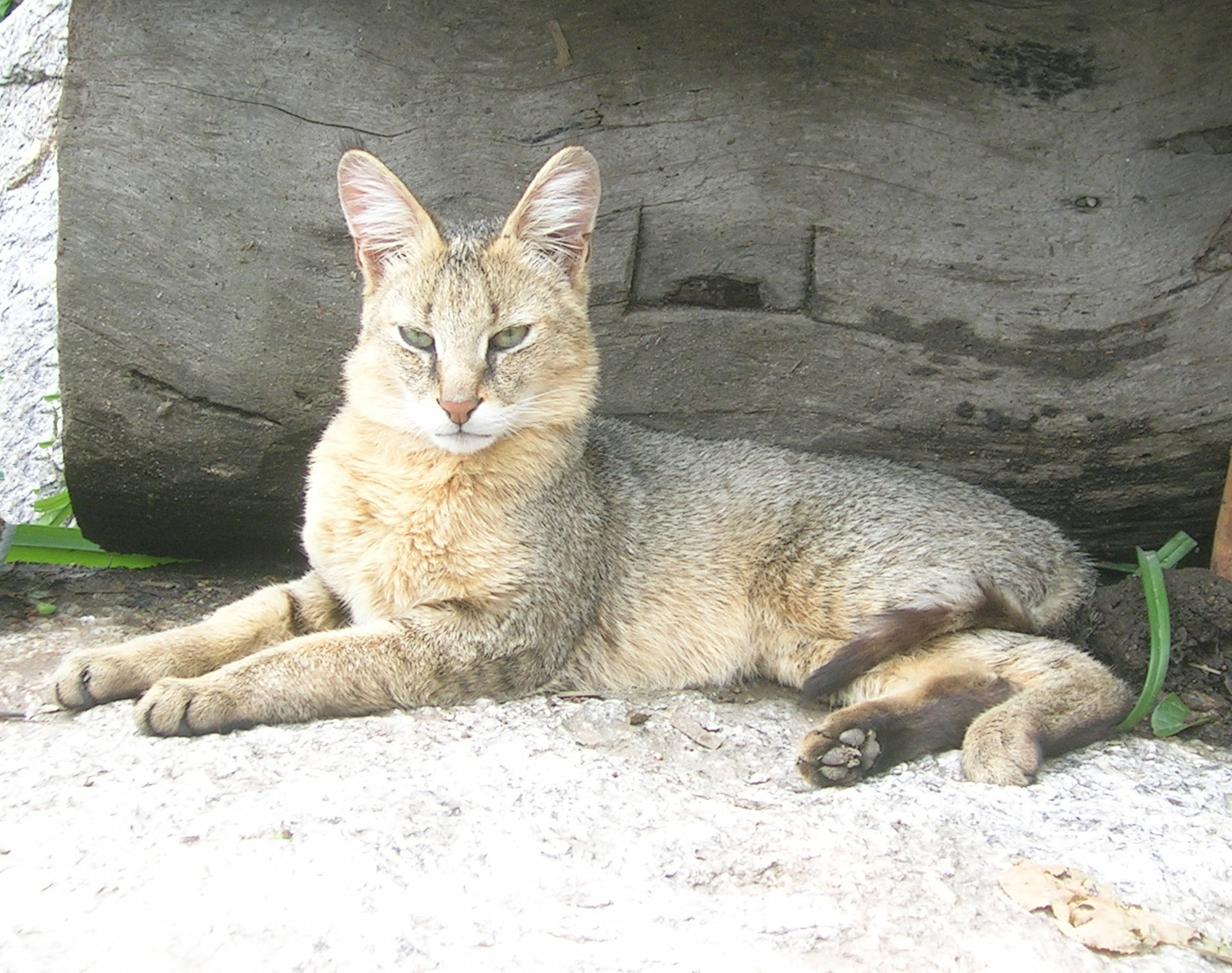

==== Genus: Panthera ====
===== Species: Panthera pardus fusca (Indian leopard / ഇന്ത്യൻ പുള്ളിപ്പുലി) =====
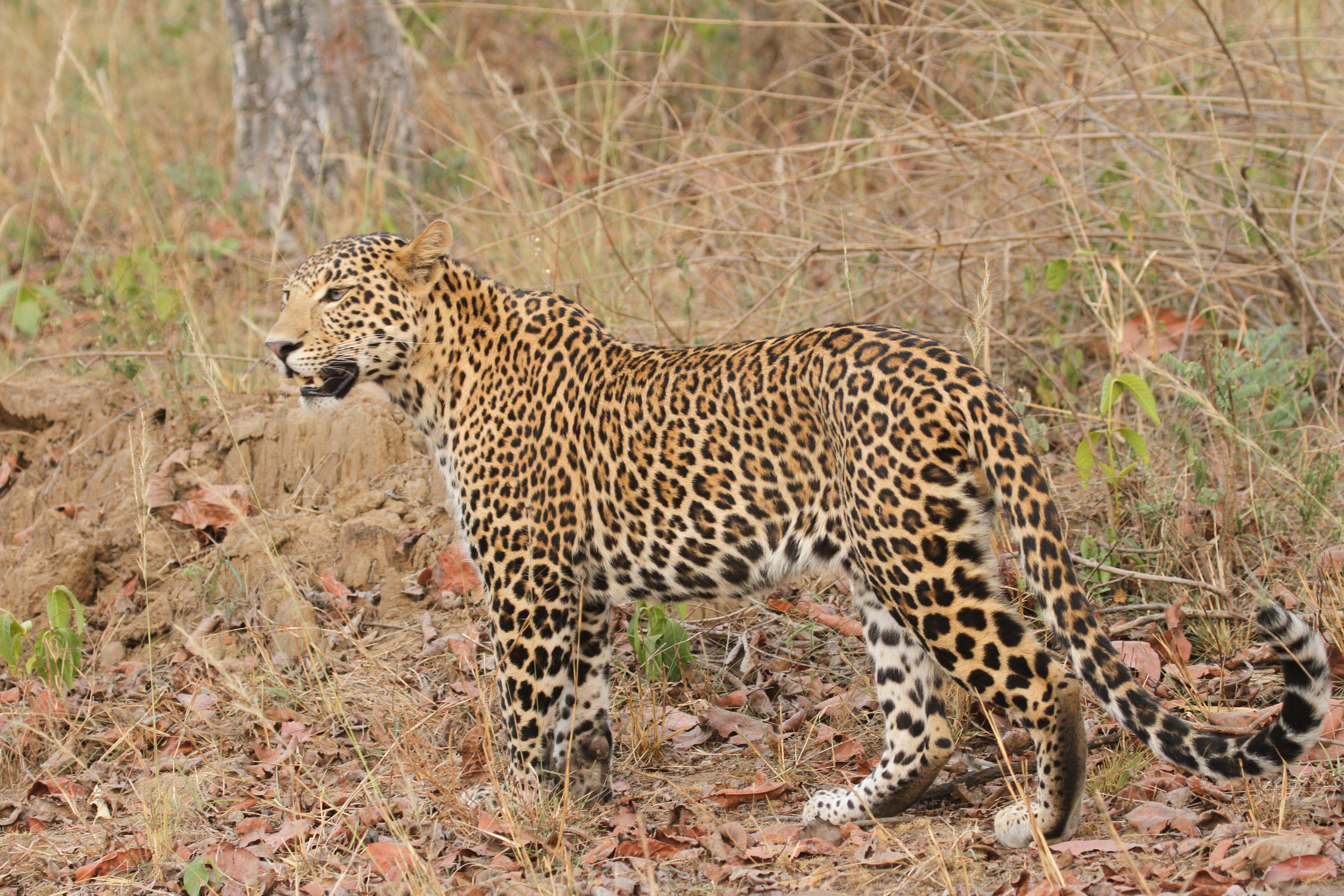

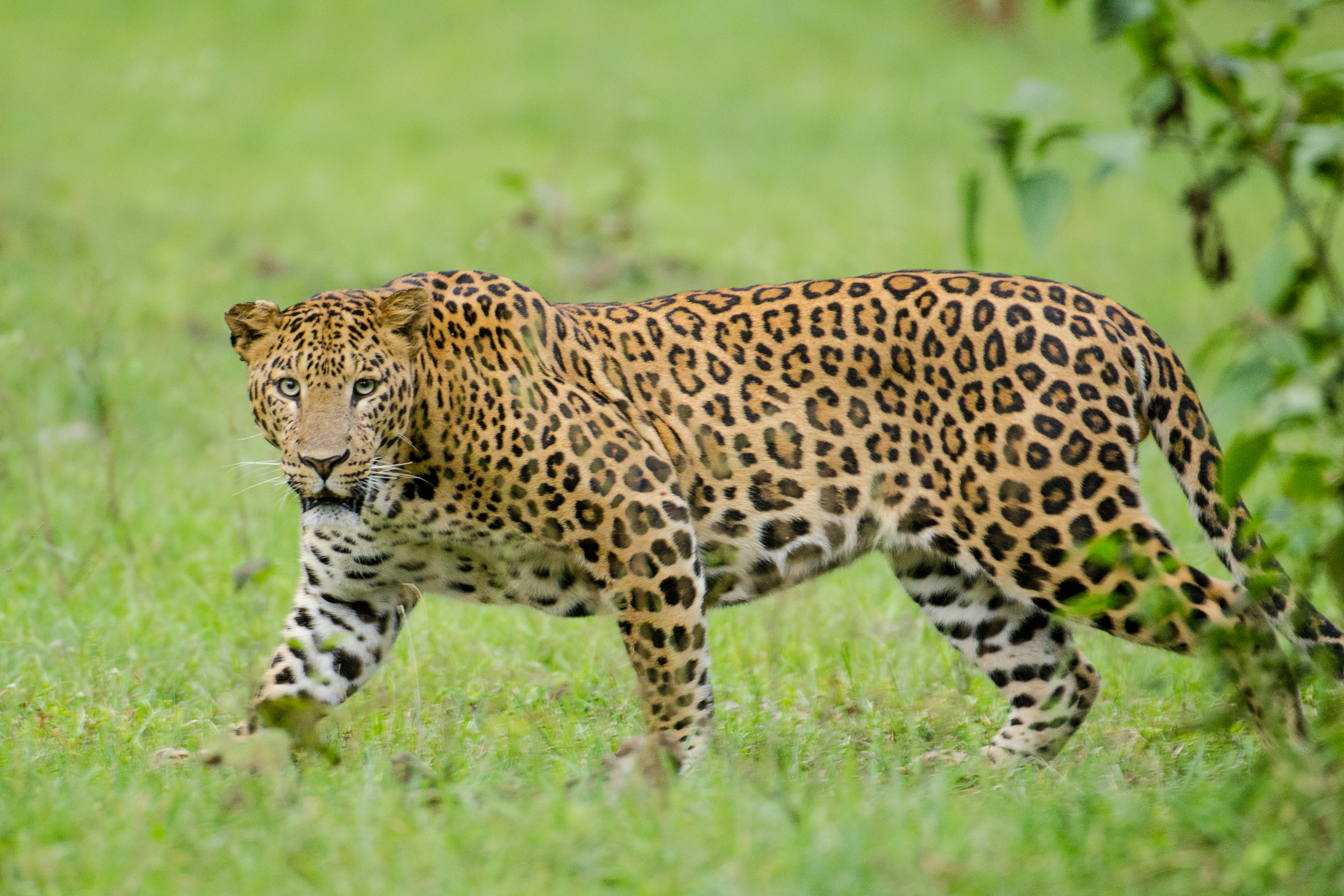

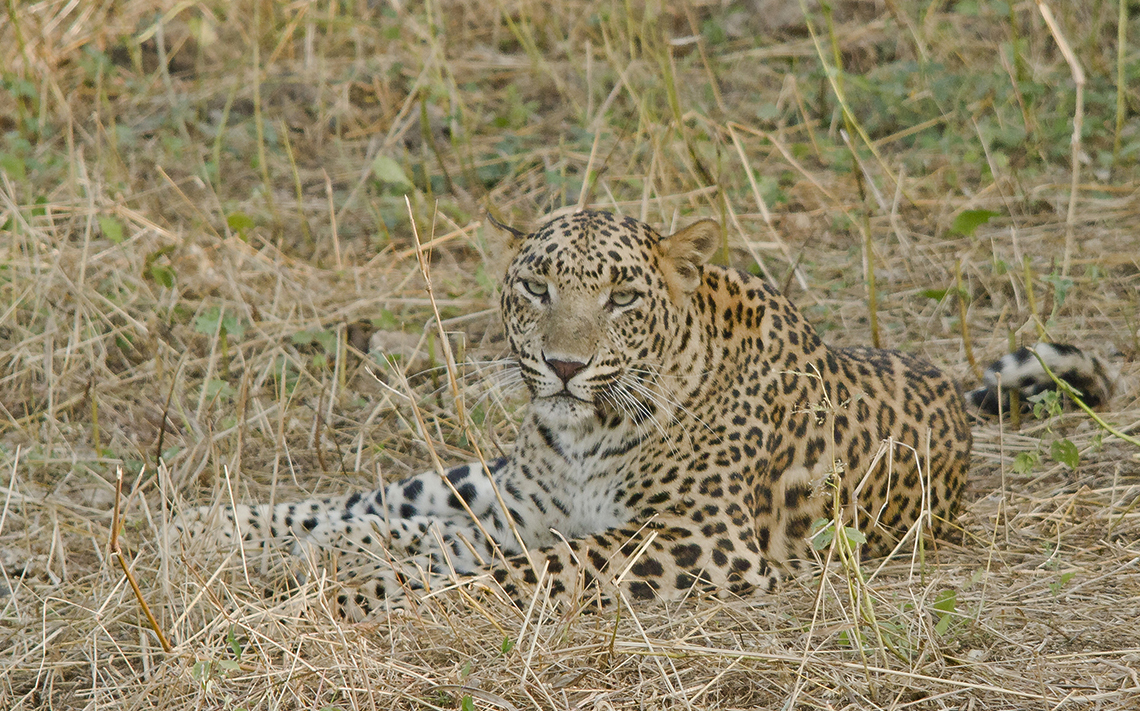

===== Species: Panthera tigris tigris (Bengal tiger / ബംഗാൾ കടുവ) =====
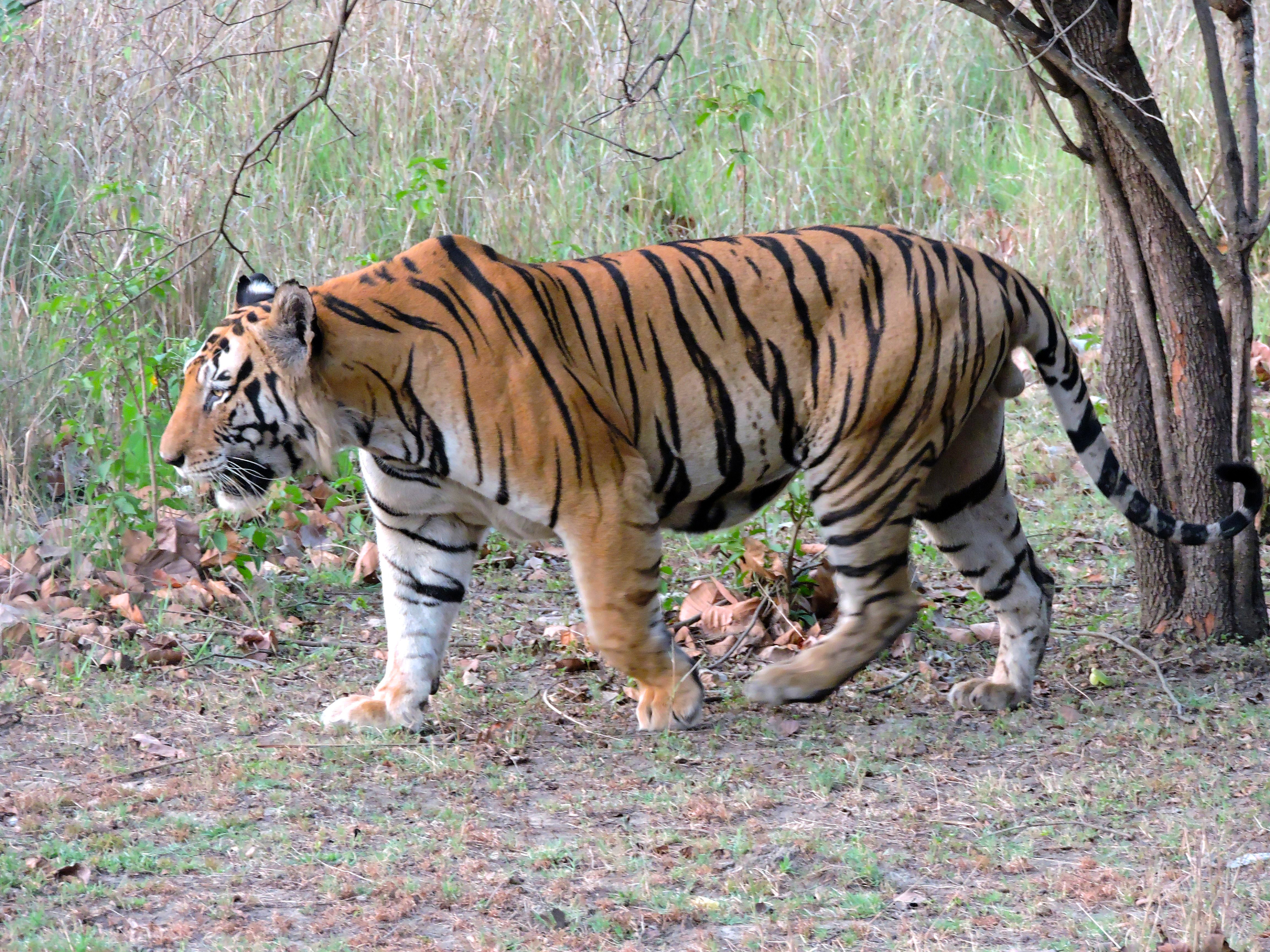

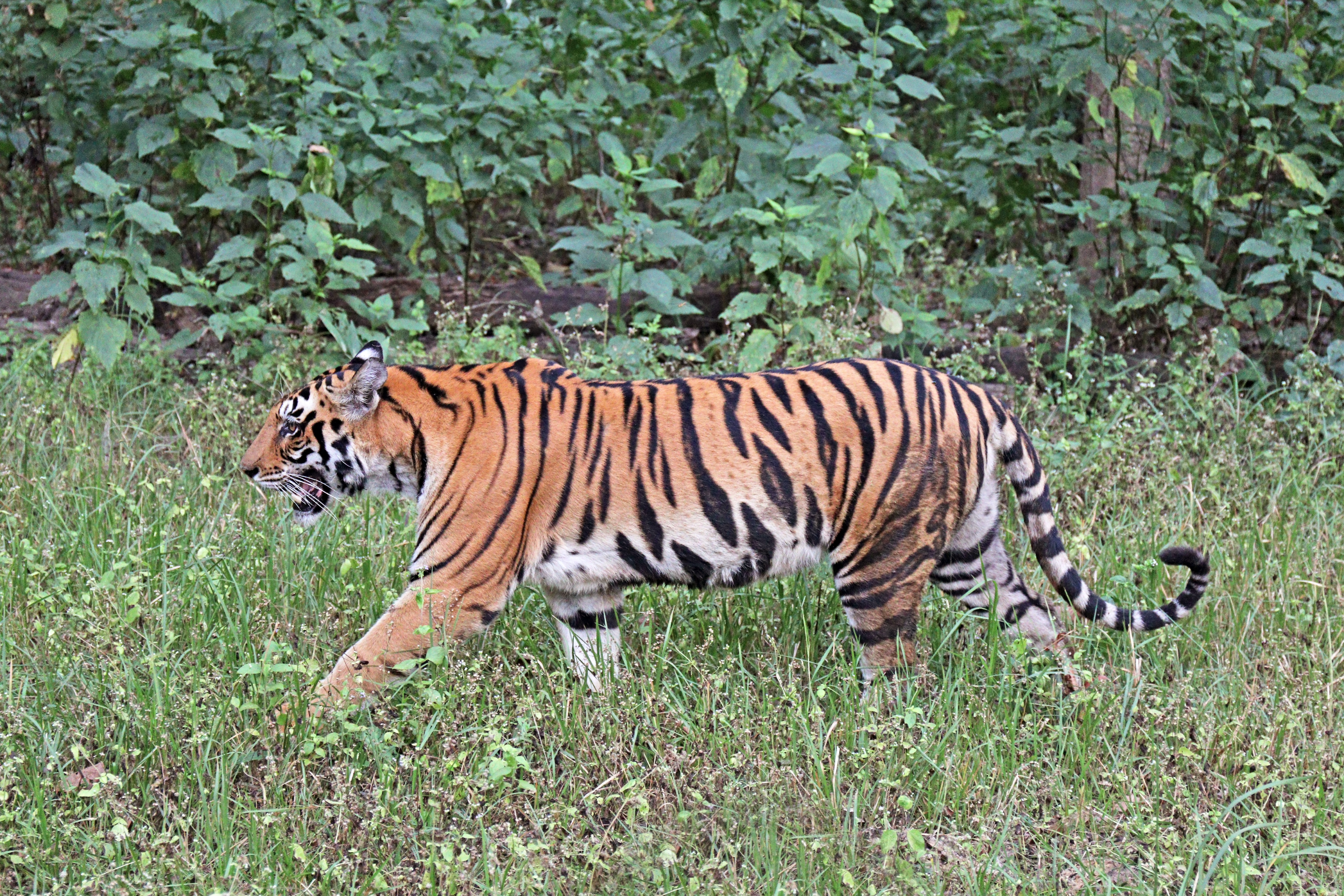

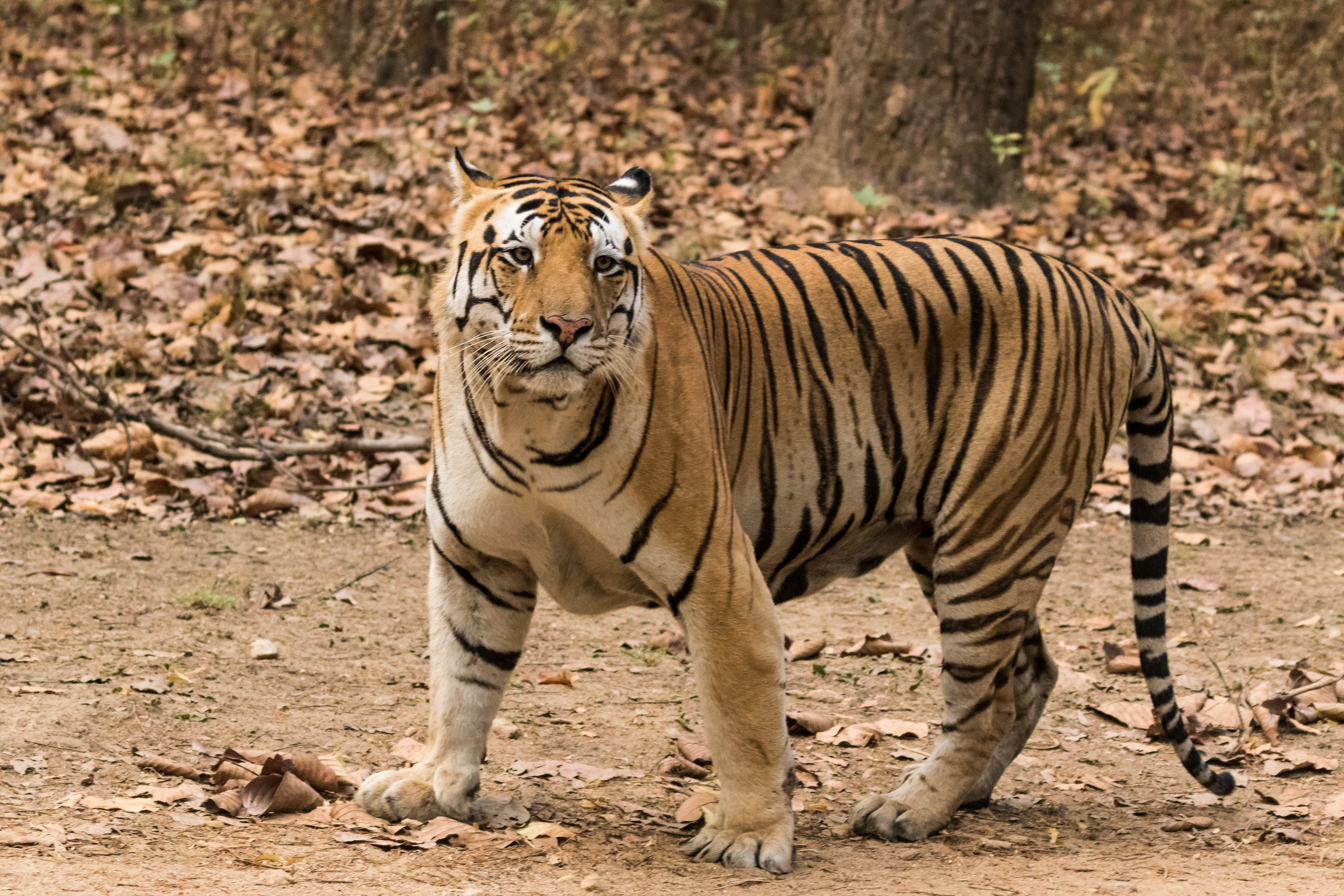

==== Genus: Prionailurus ====
===== Species: Prionailurus bengalensis (leopard cat / പൂച്ചപ്പുലി) =====
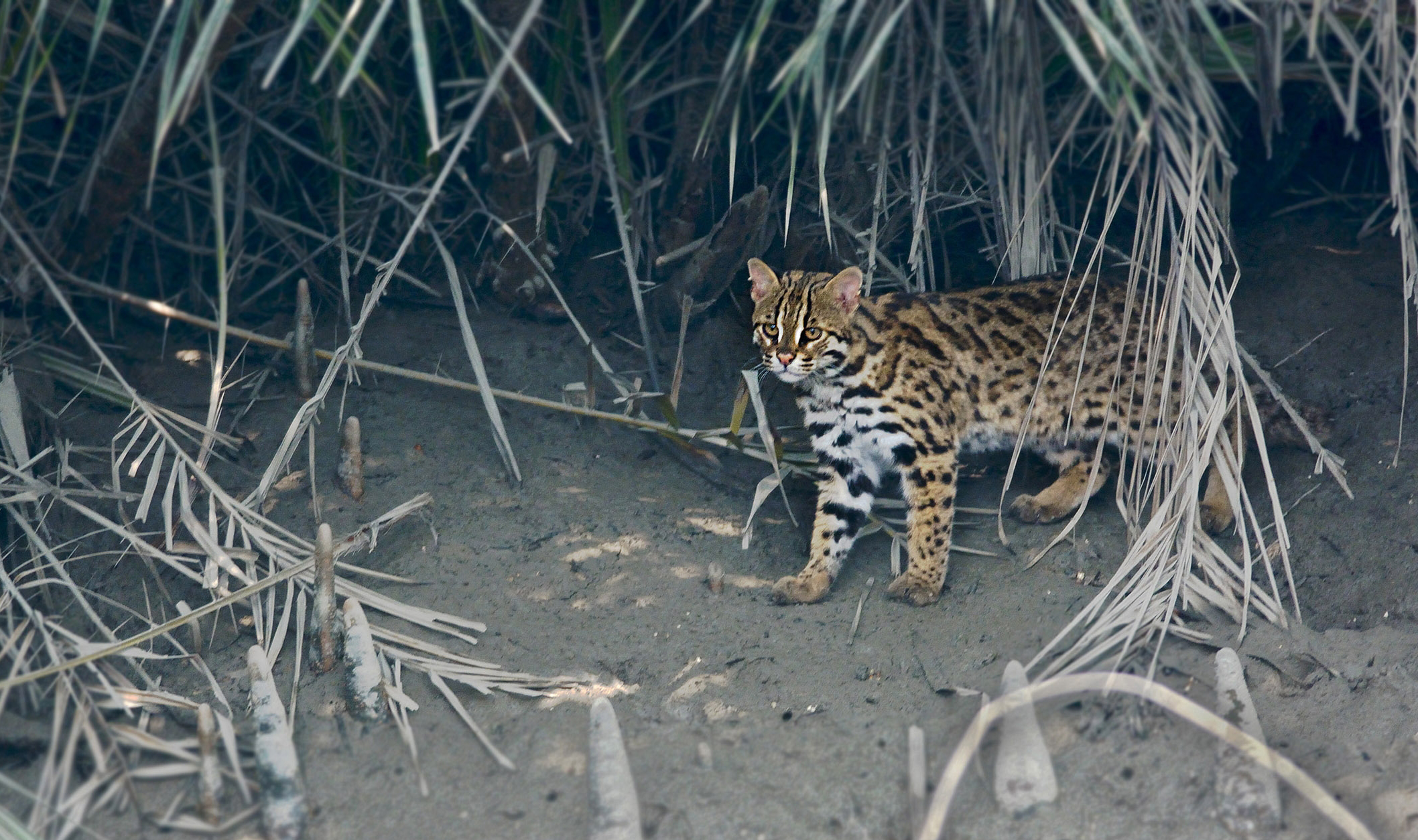

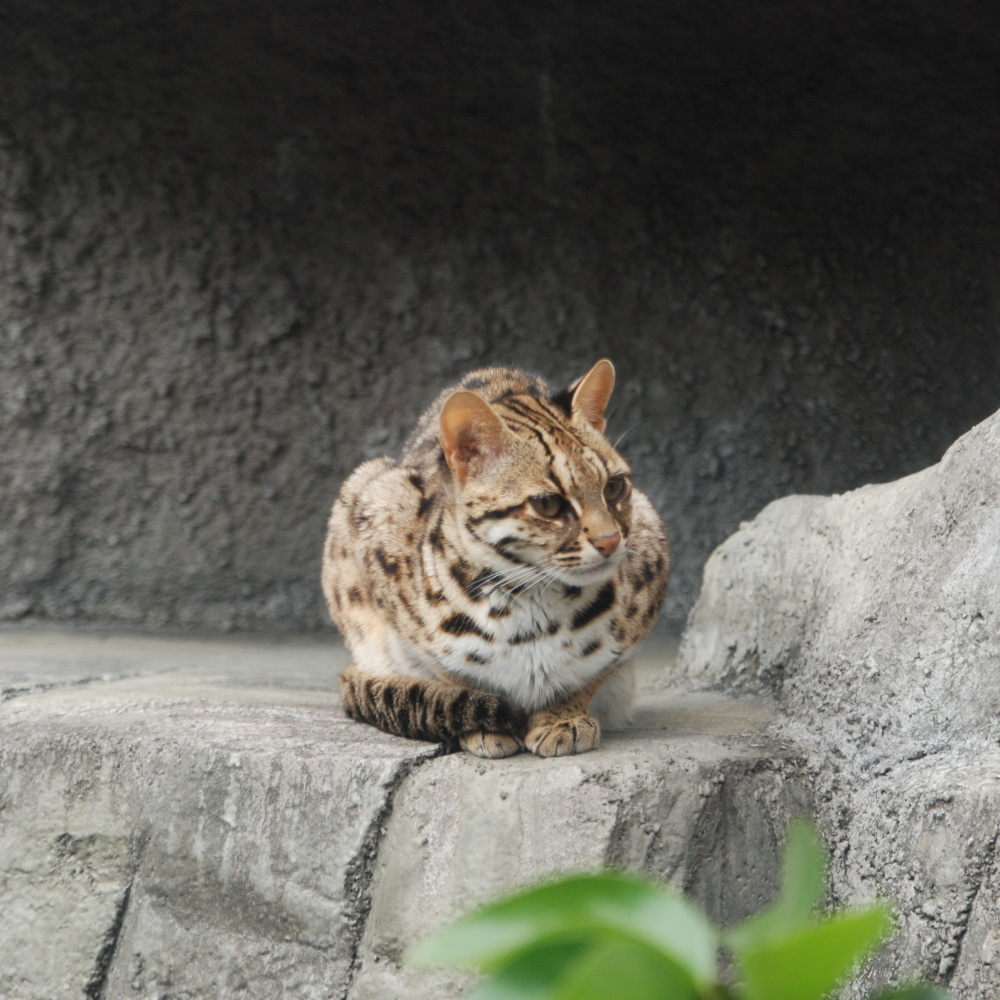

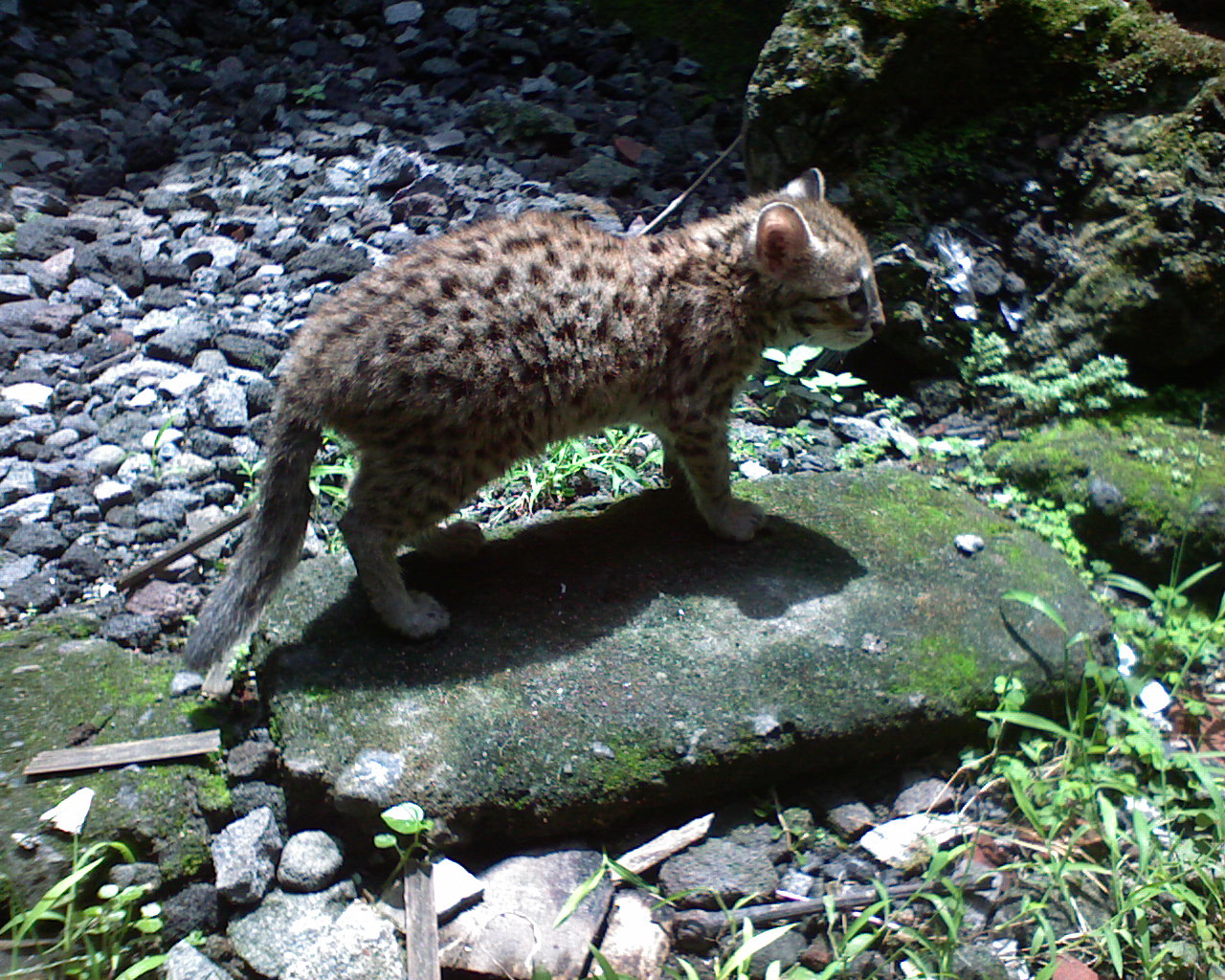

===== Species: Prionailurus rubiginosus (rusty-spotted cat / തുരുമ്പൻ പൂച്ച) =====
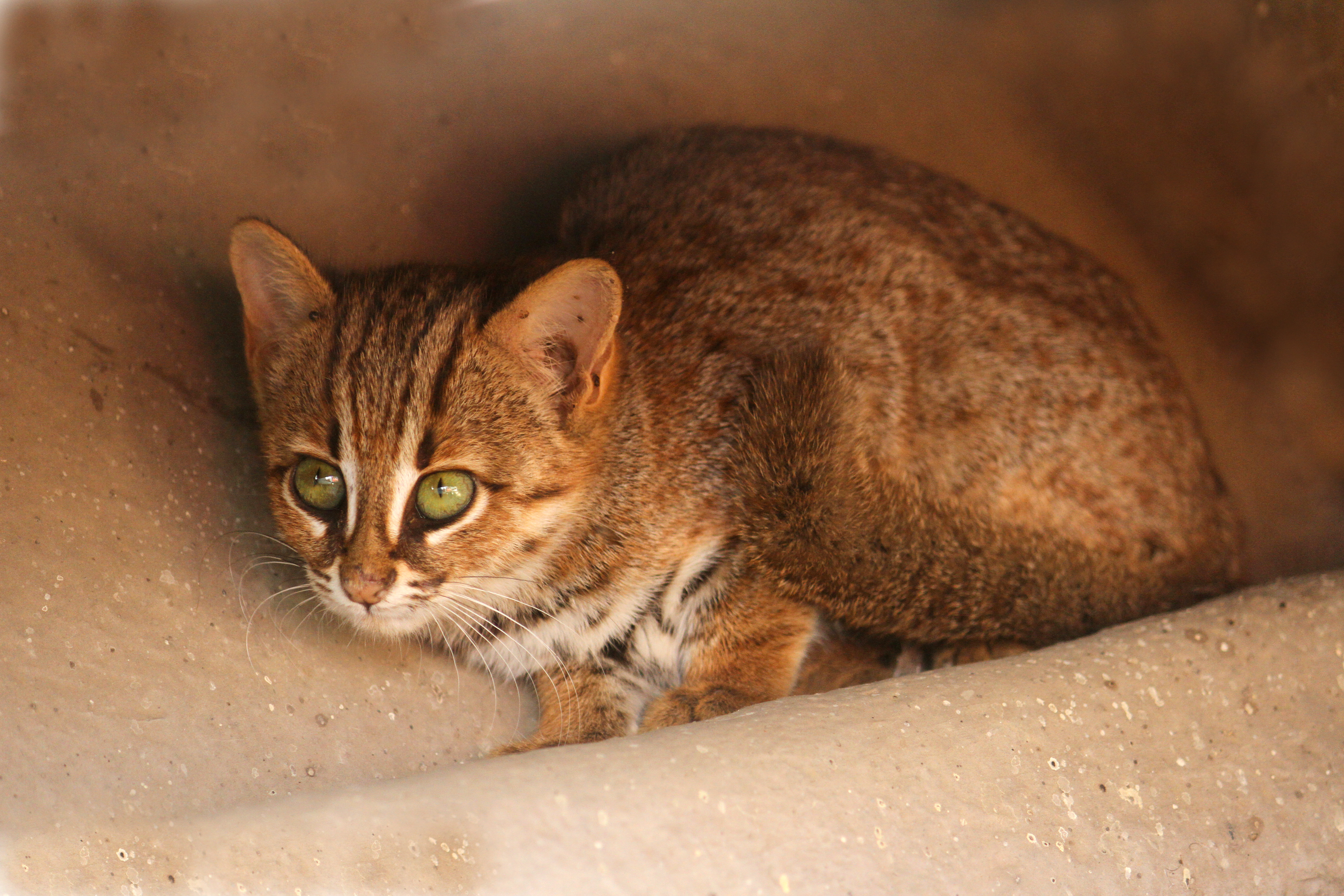

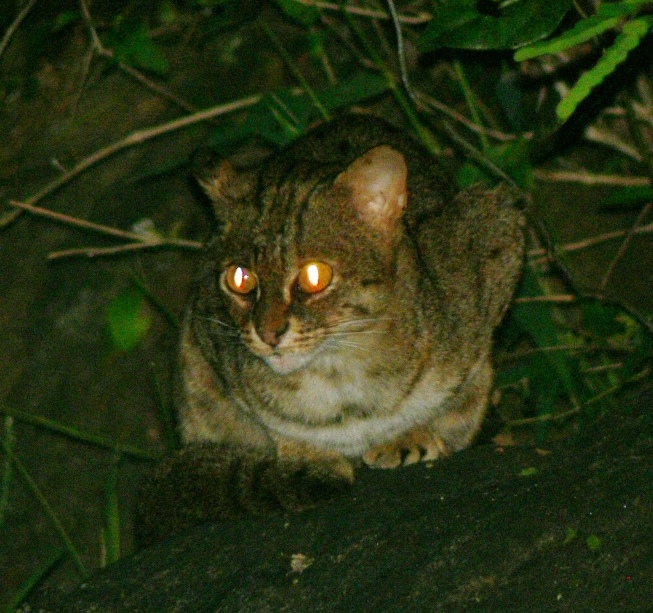

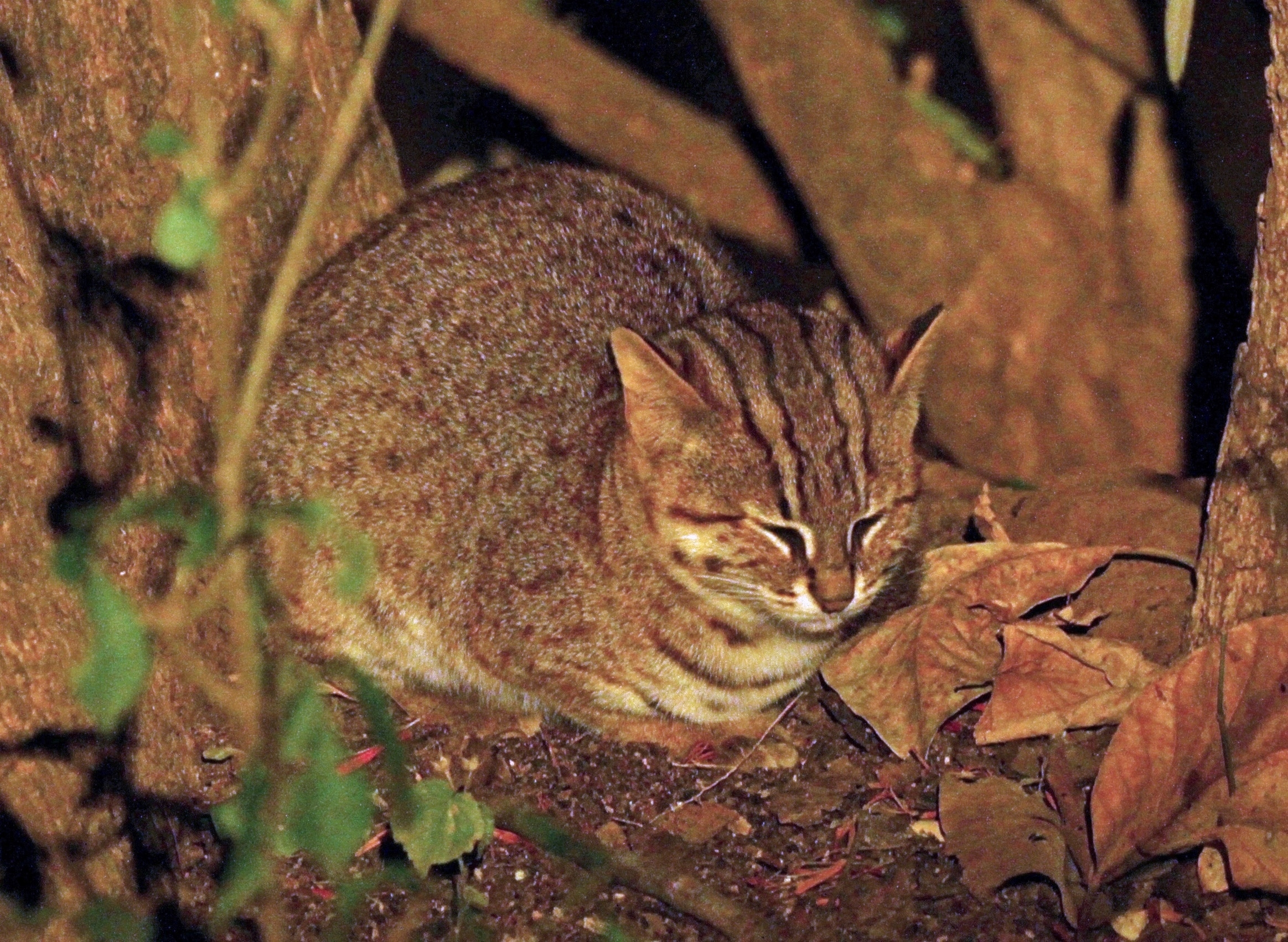

=== Family: Herpestidae ===
==== Genus: Urva ====
===== Species: Urva edwardsii (Indian grey mongoose / നാടൻ കീരി) =====
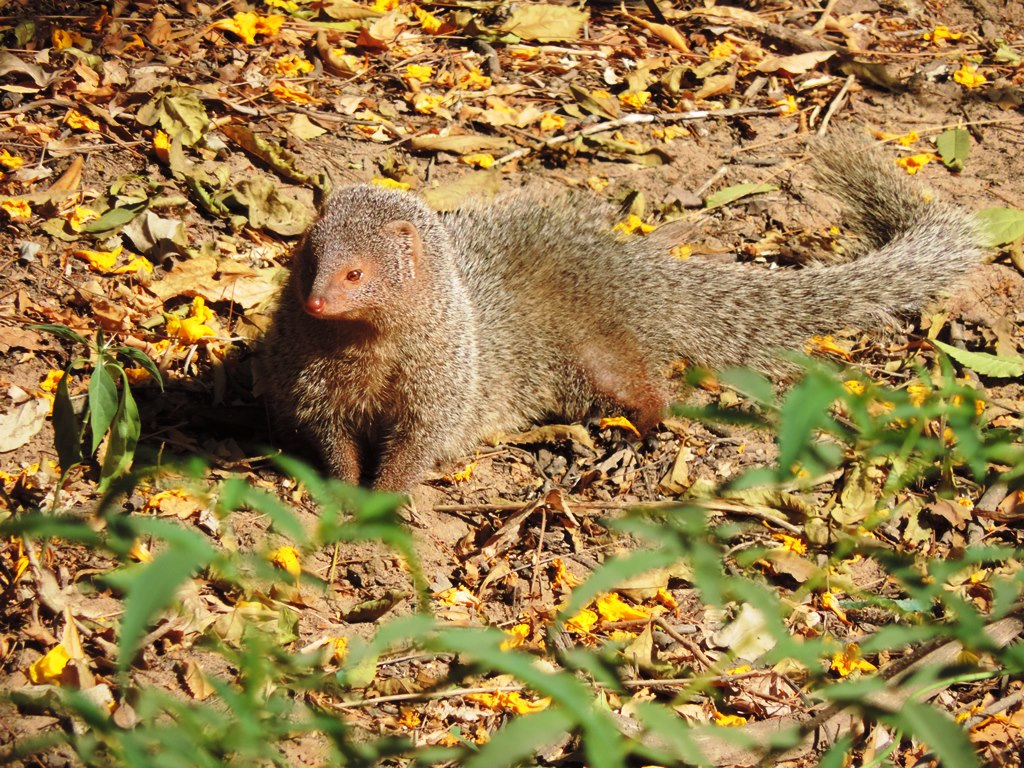

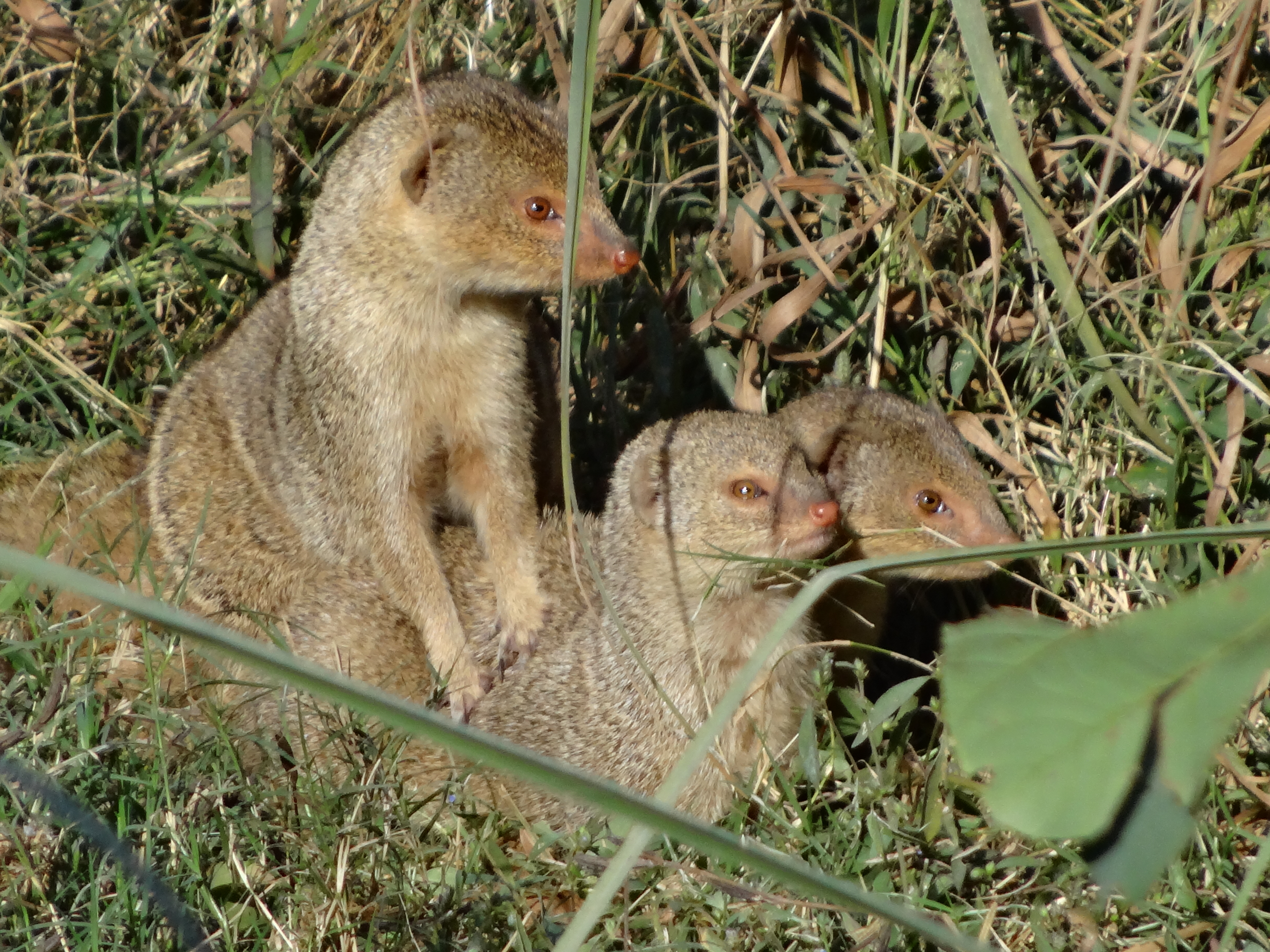

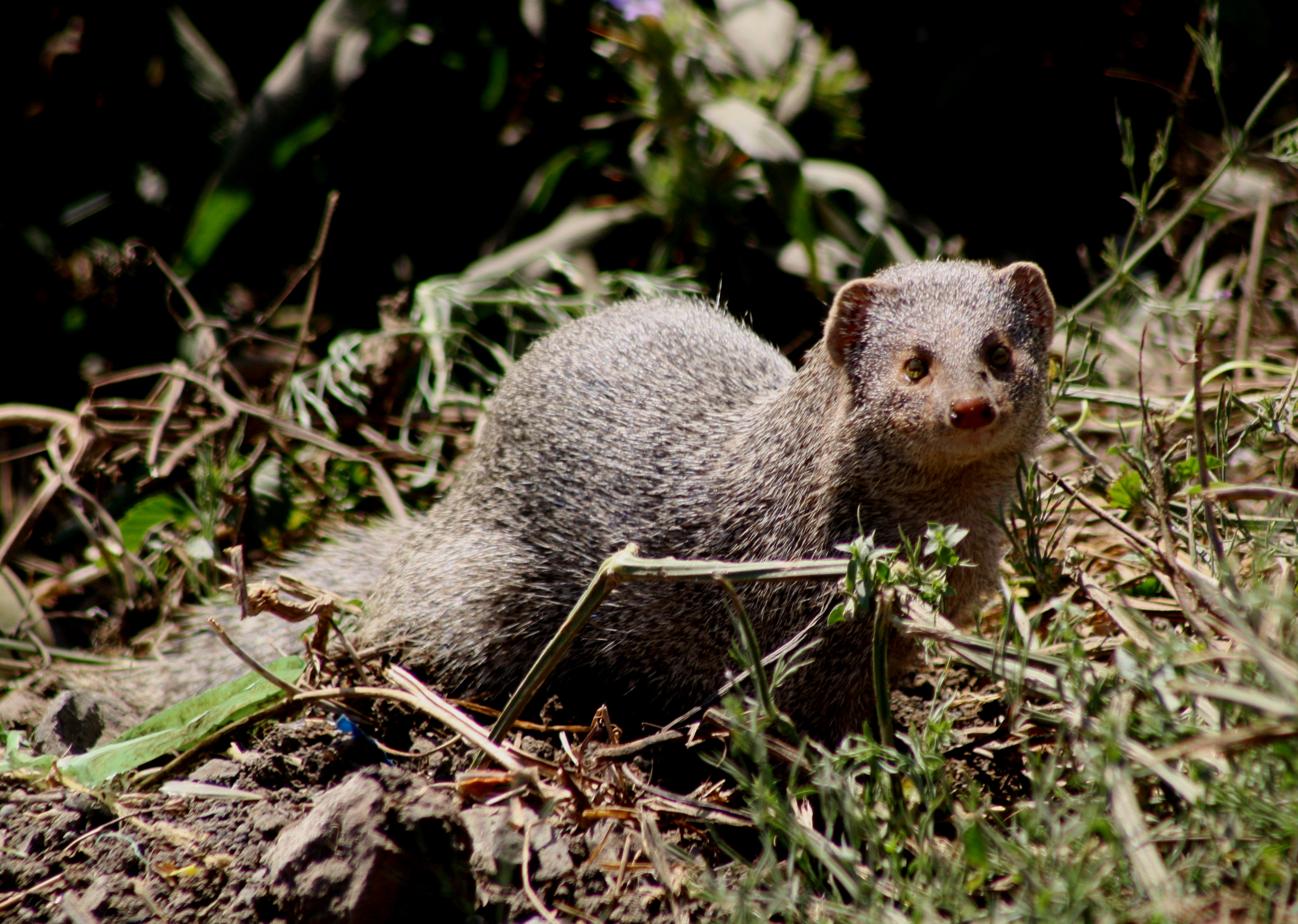

===== Species: Urva fusca (Indian brown mongoose / തവിടൻ കീരി) =====
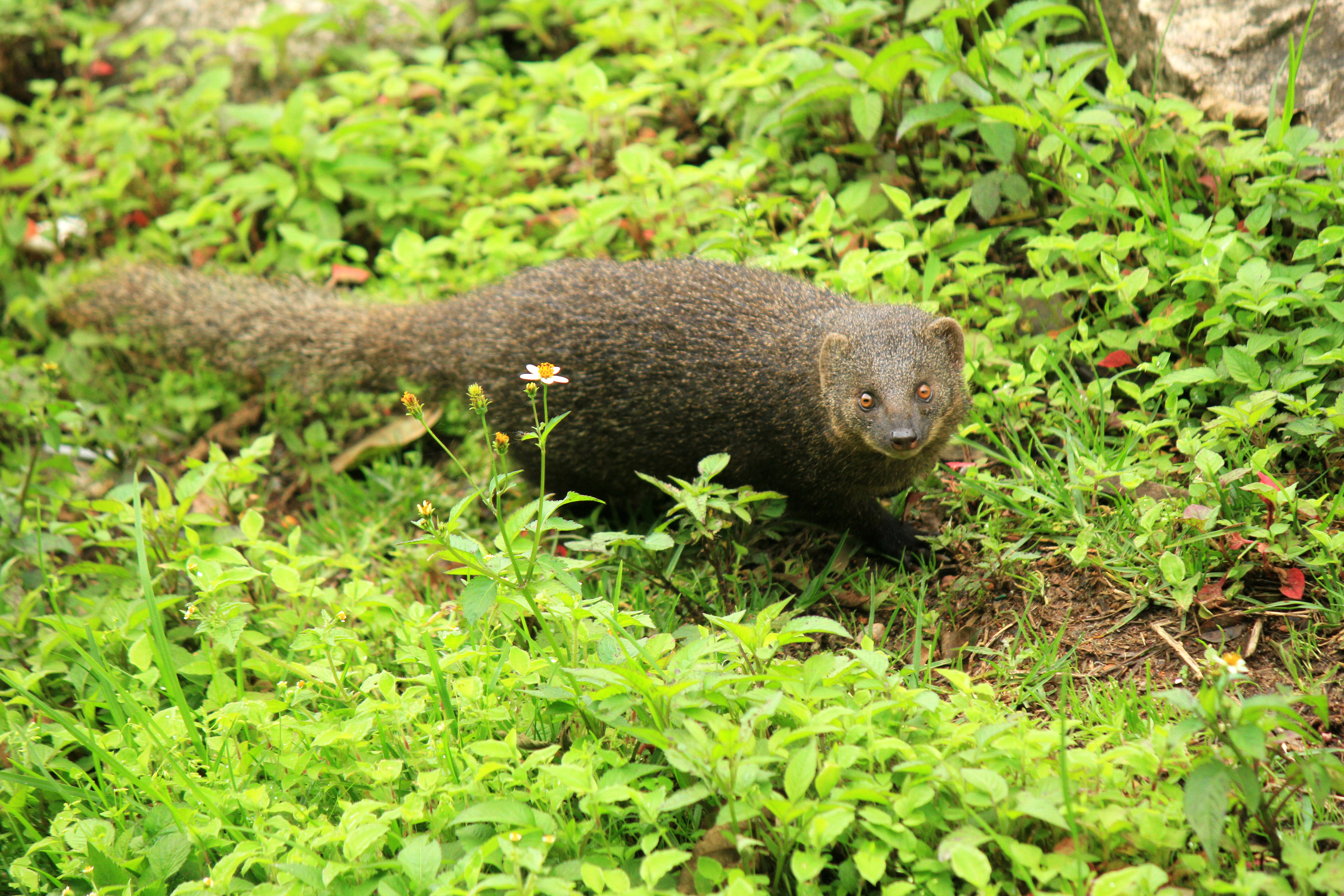

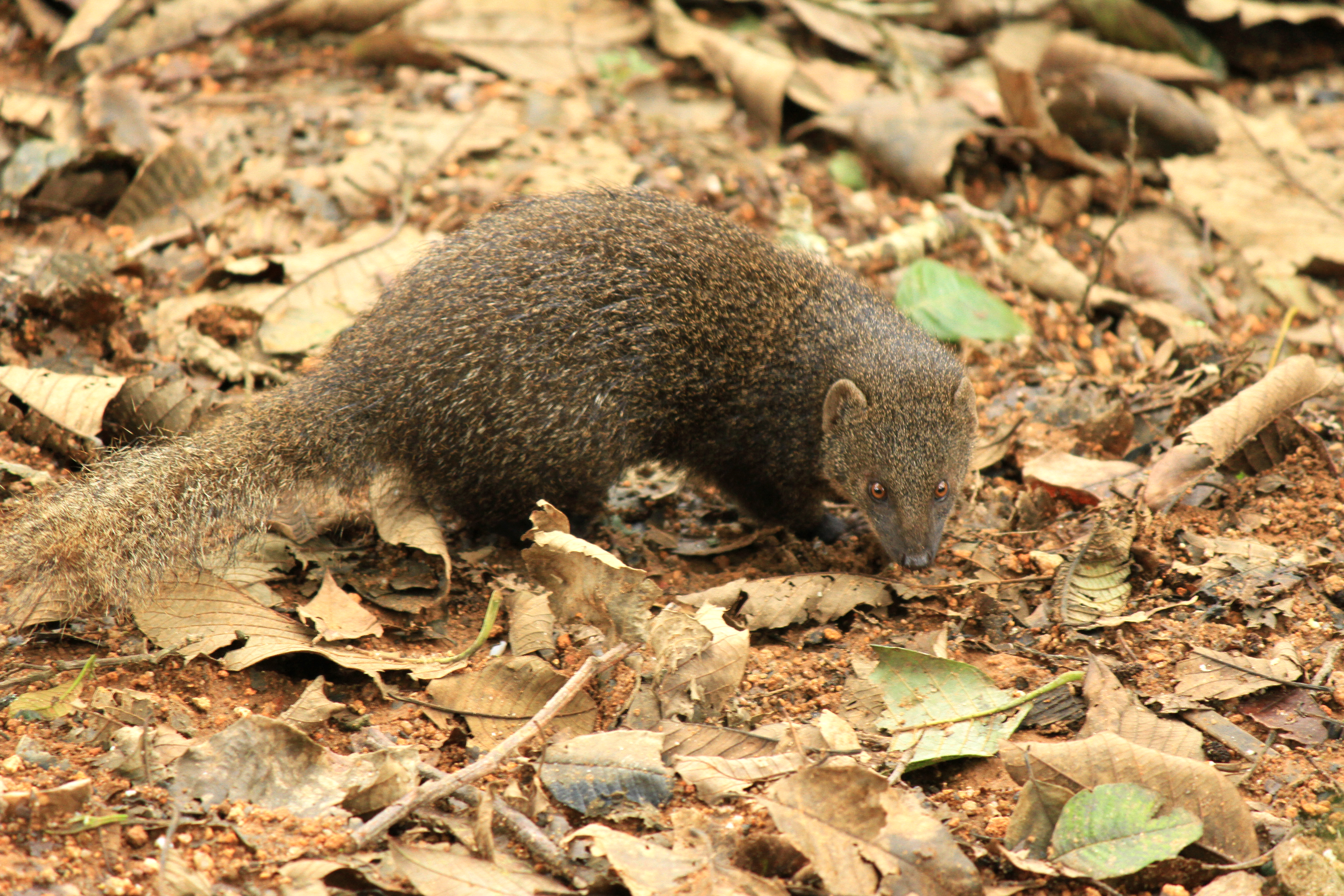

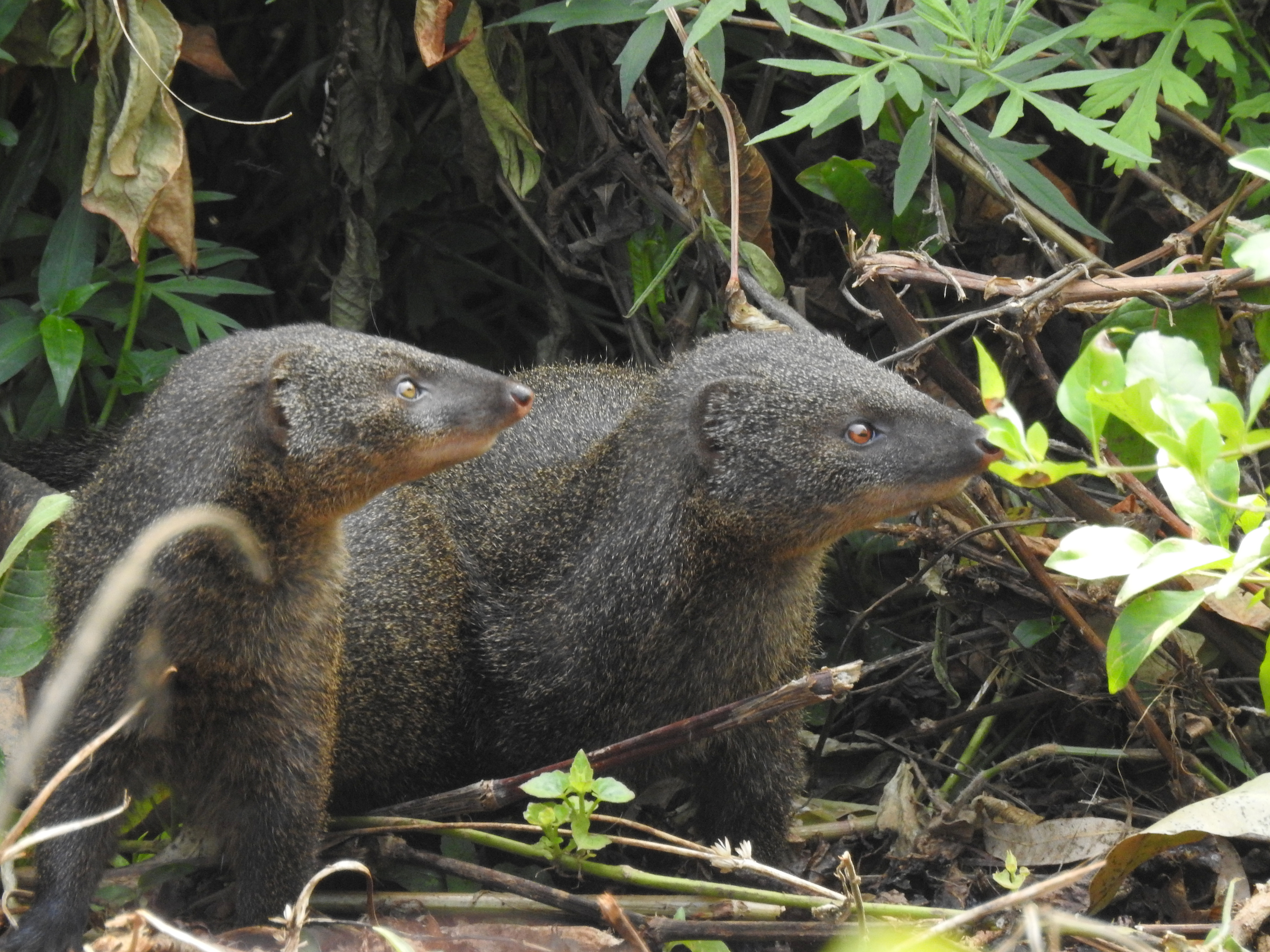

===== Species: Urva smithii (ruddy mongoose / ചുണയൻ കീരി) =====
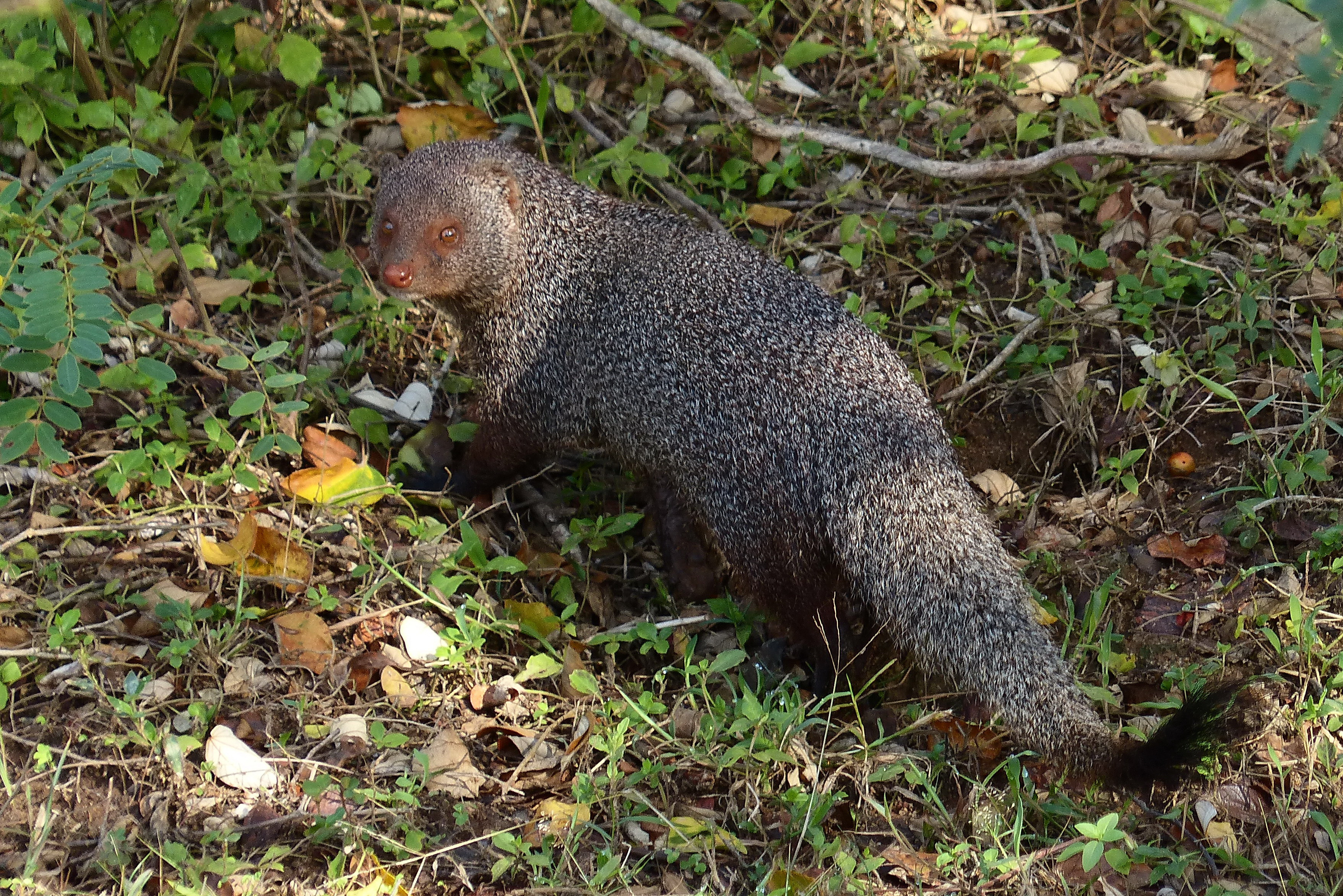

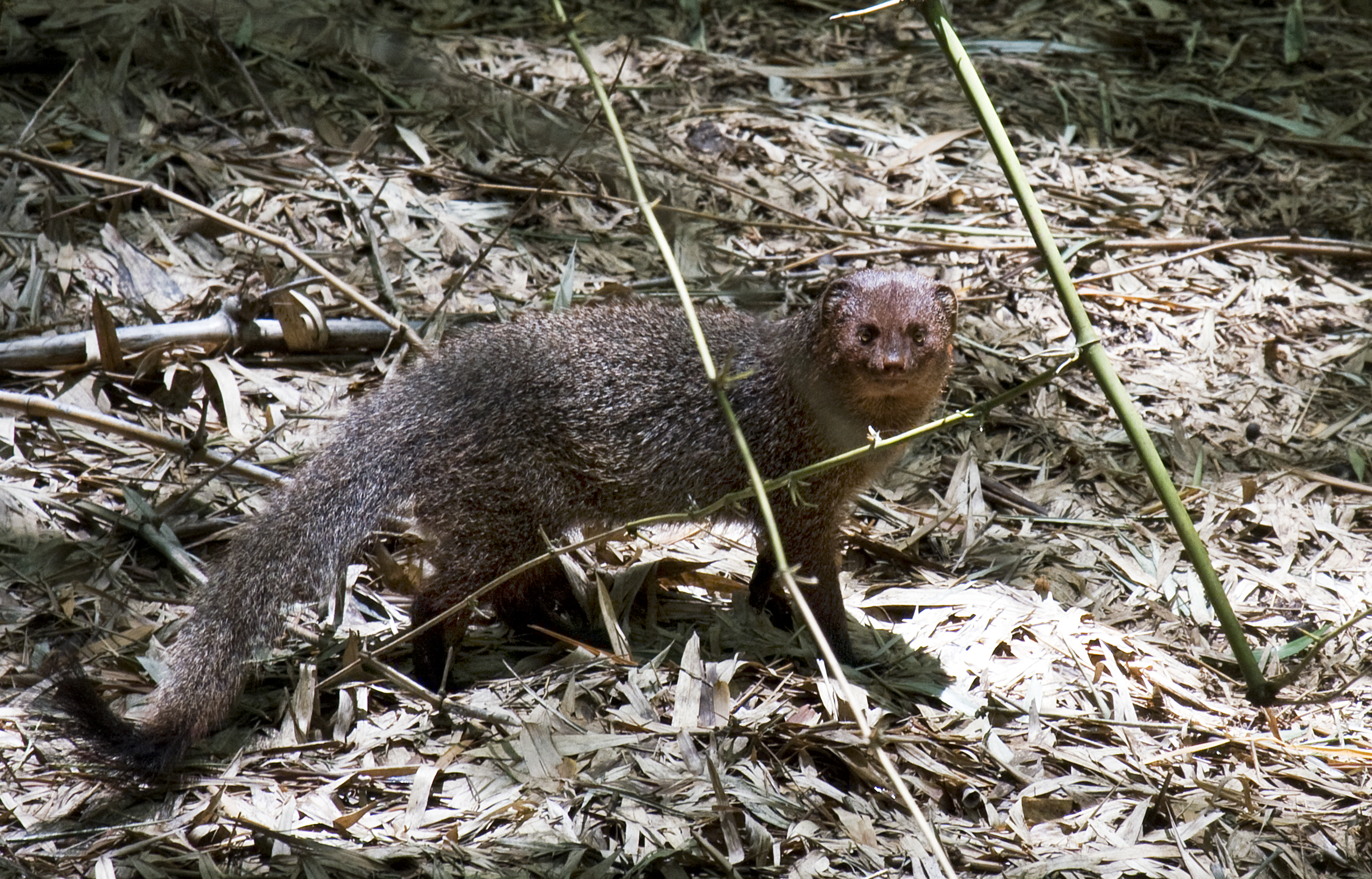

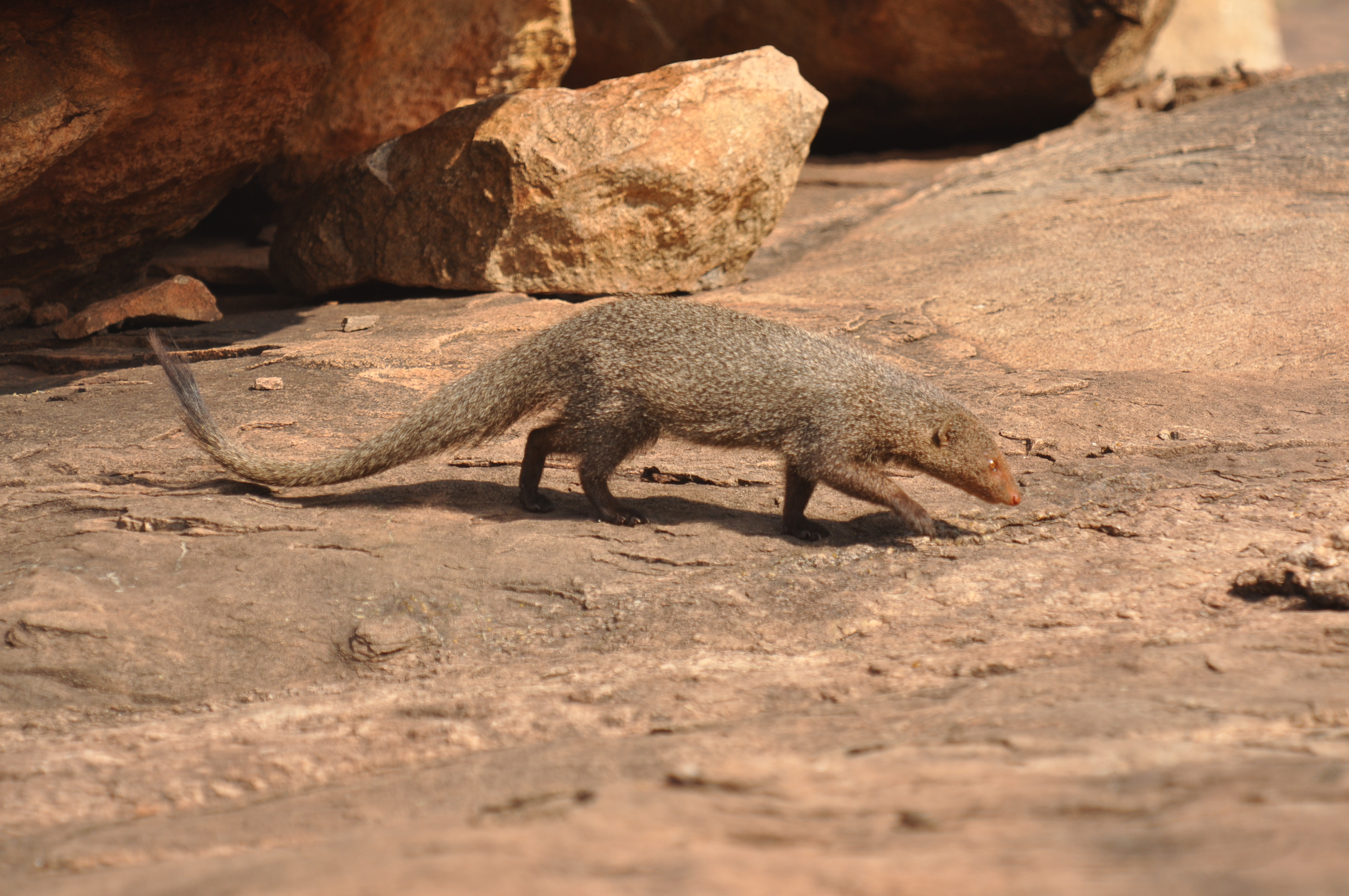

===== Species: Urva vitticolla (stripe-necked mongoose / ചെങ്കീരി) =====
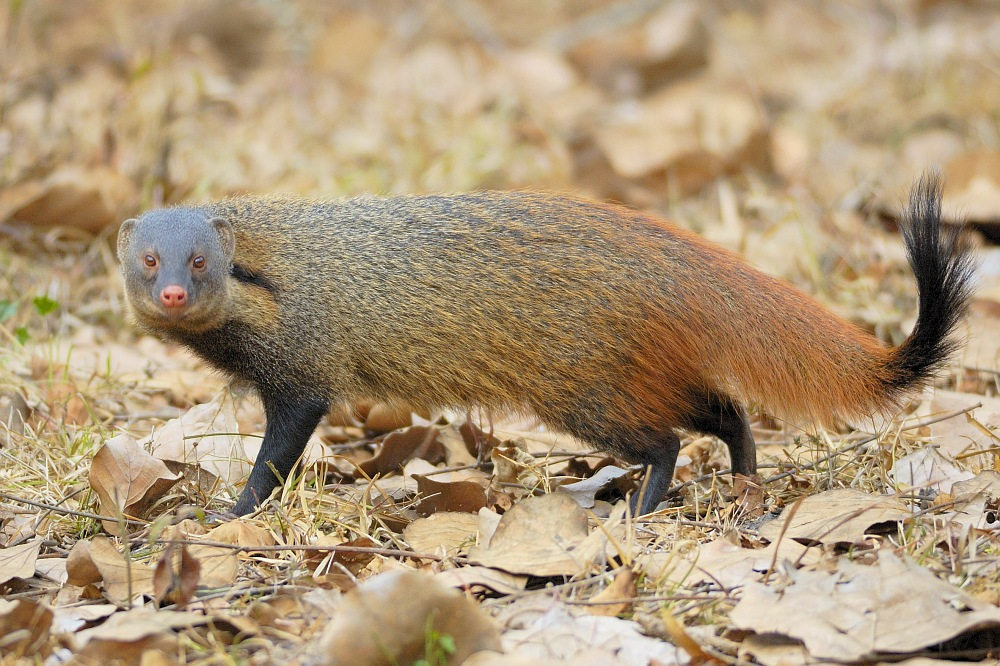

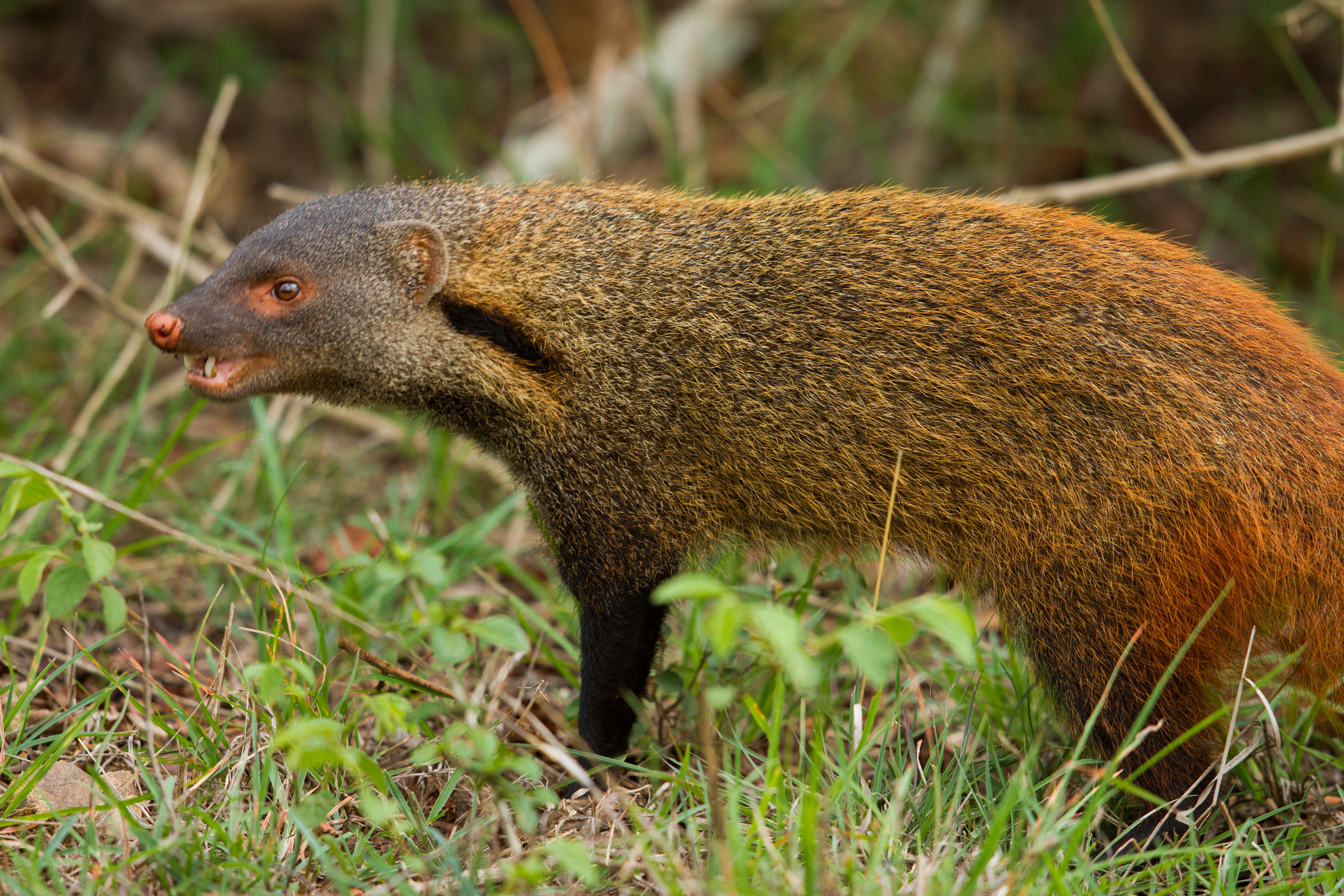

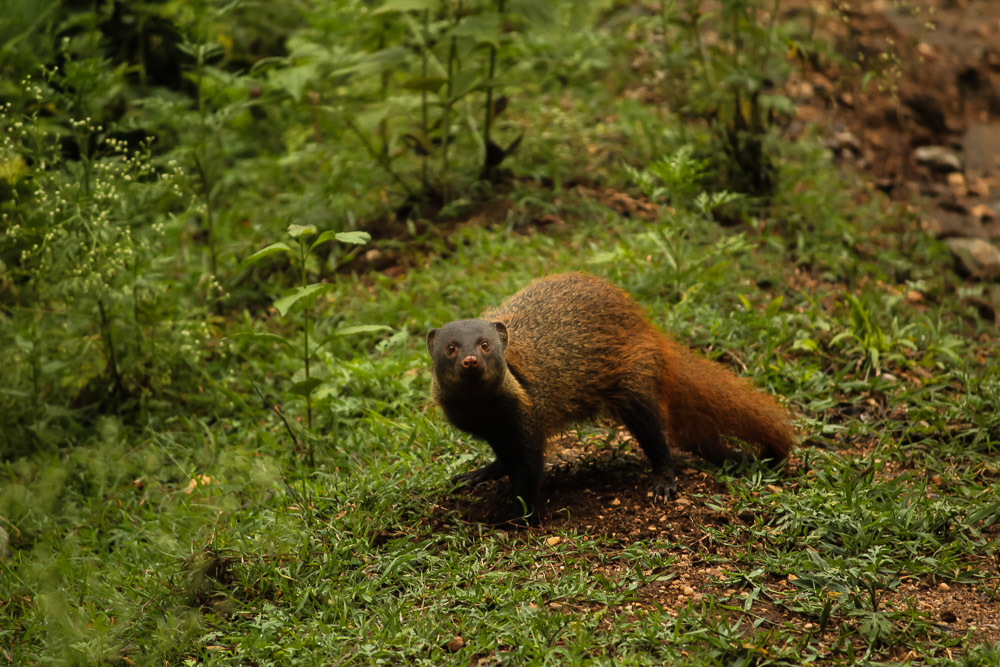

=== Family: Mustelidae ===
==== Genus: Aonyx ====
===== Species: Aonyx cinerea (Asian small-clawed otter / മല നീർനായ) =====
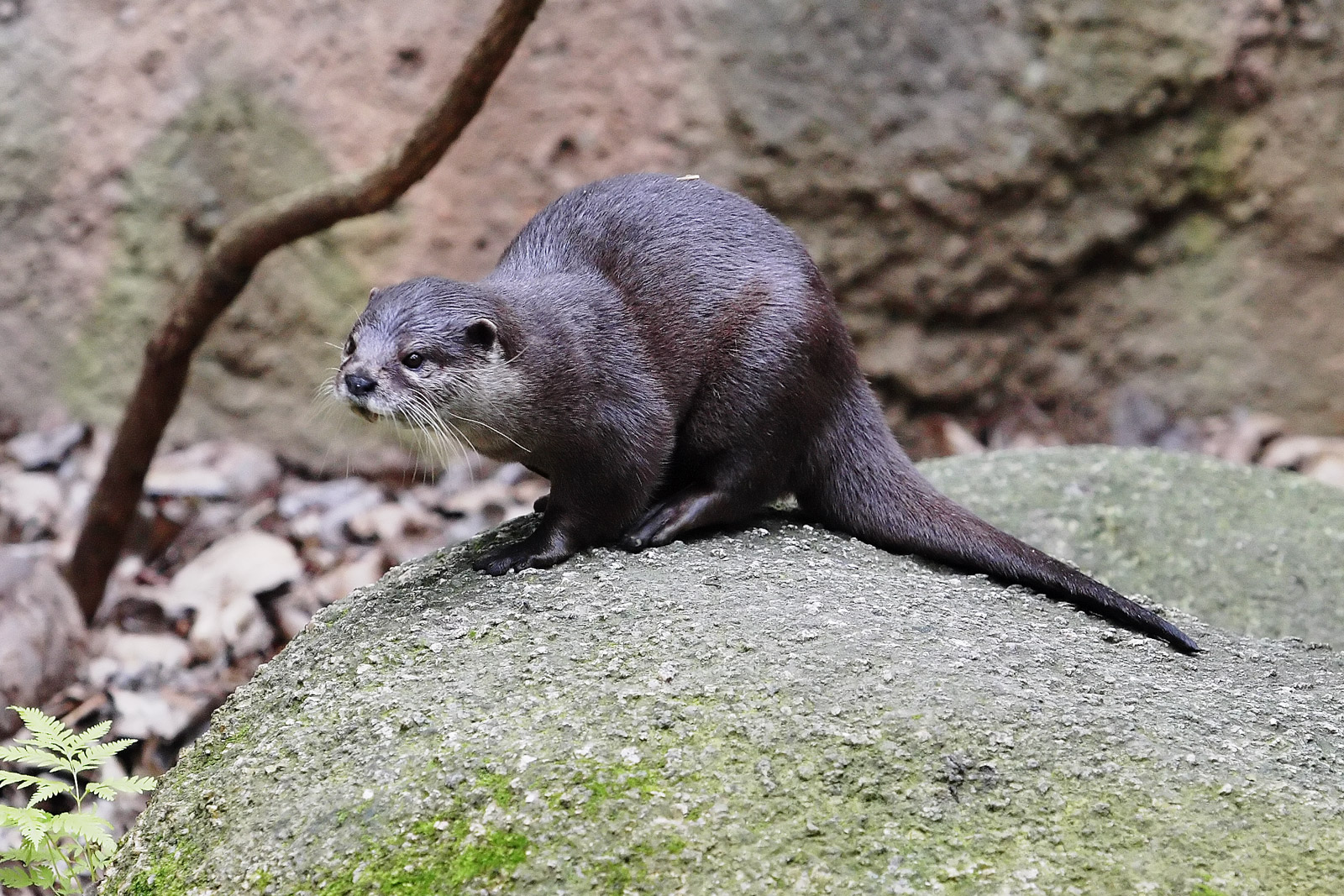

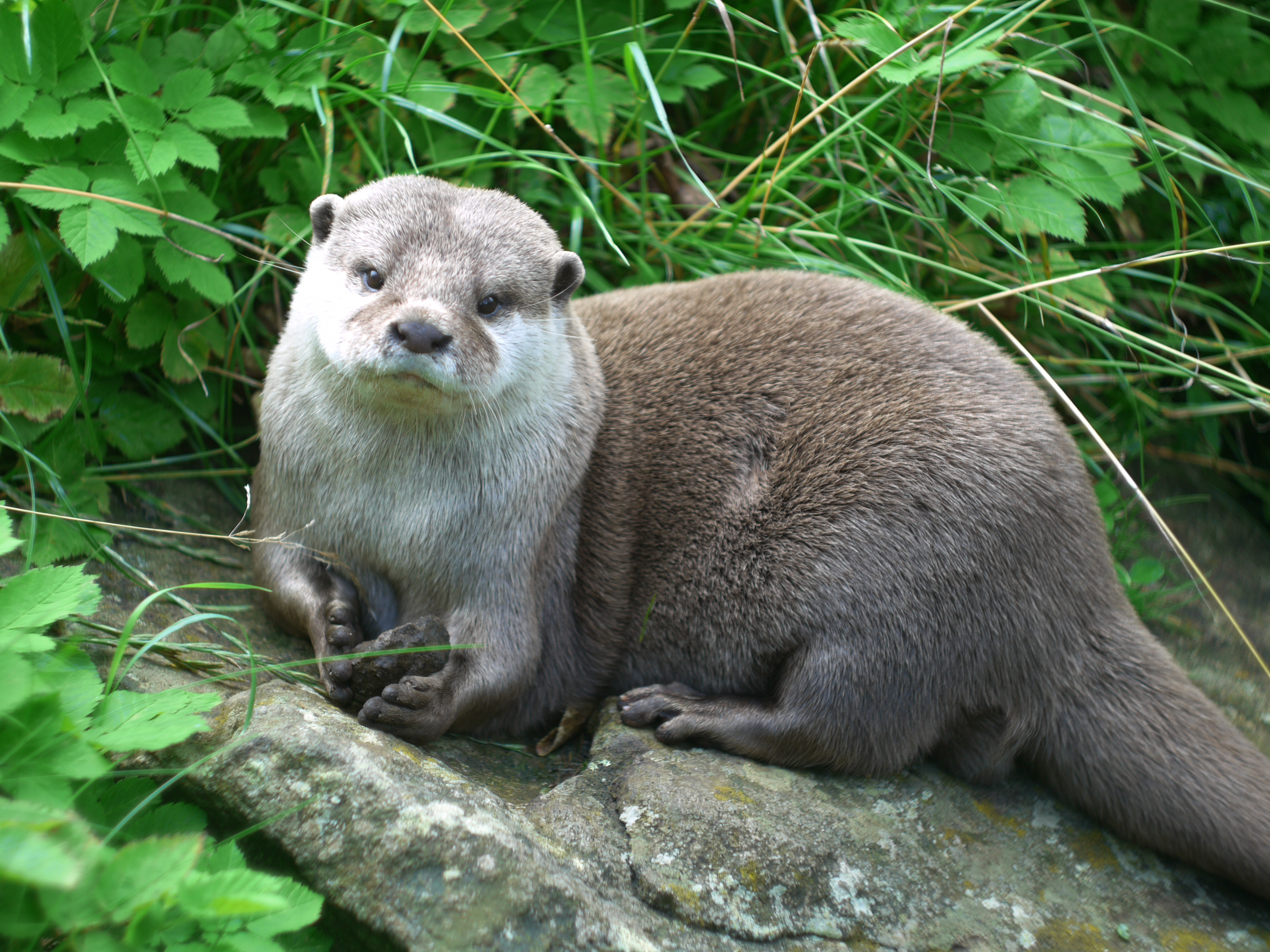

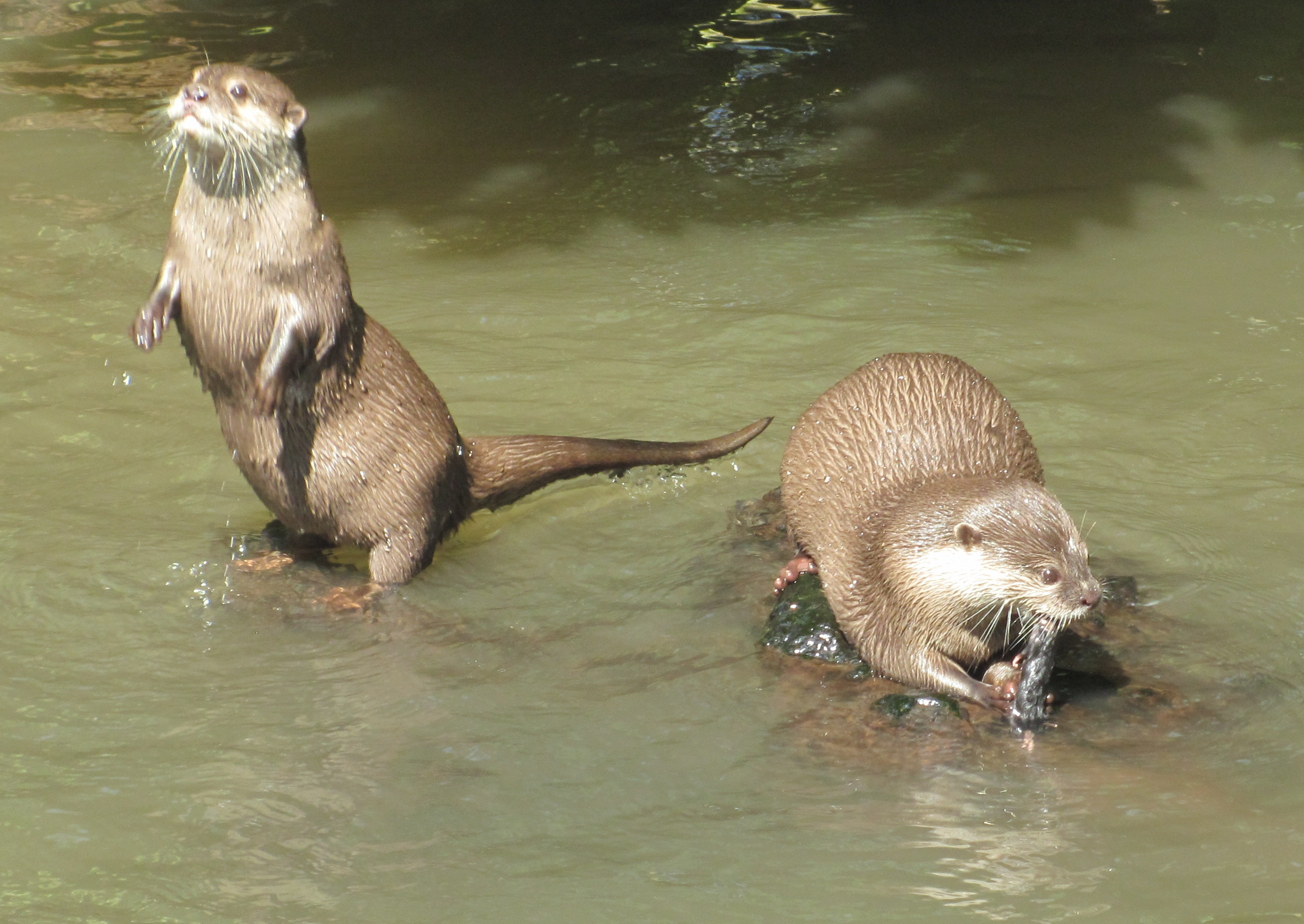

==== Genus: Lutrogale ====
===== Species: Lutrogale perspicillata (smooth-coated otter / സ്മൂത്ത്-കോട്ടഡ് നീർനായ) =====
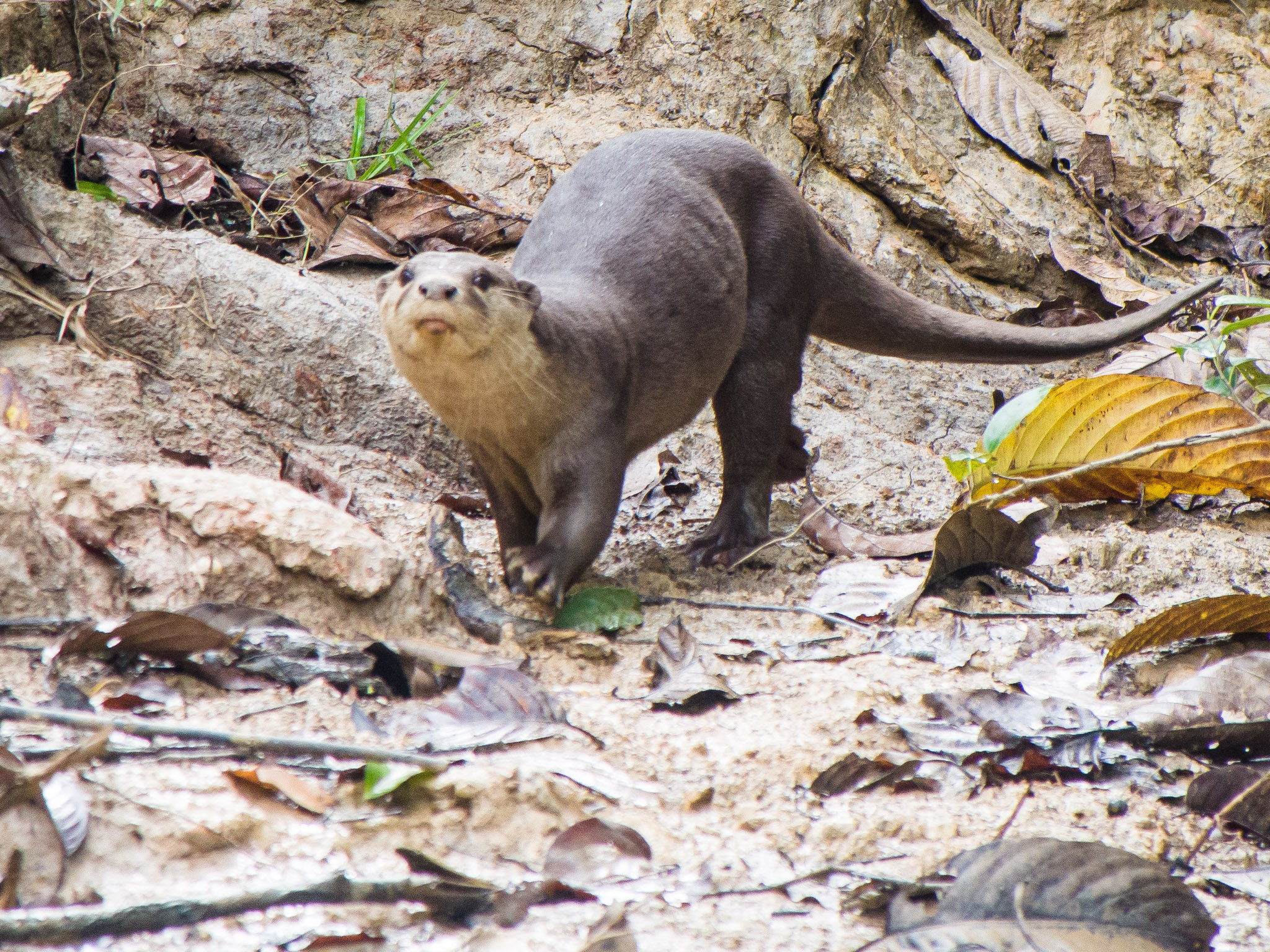

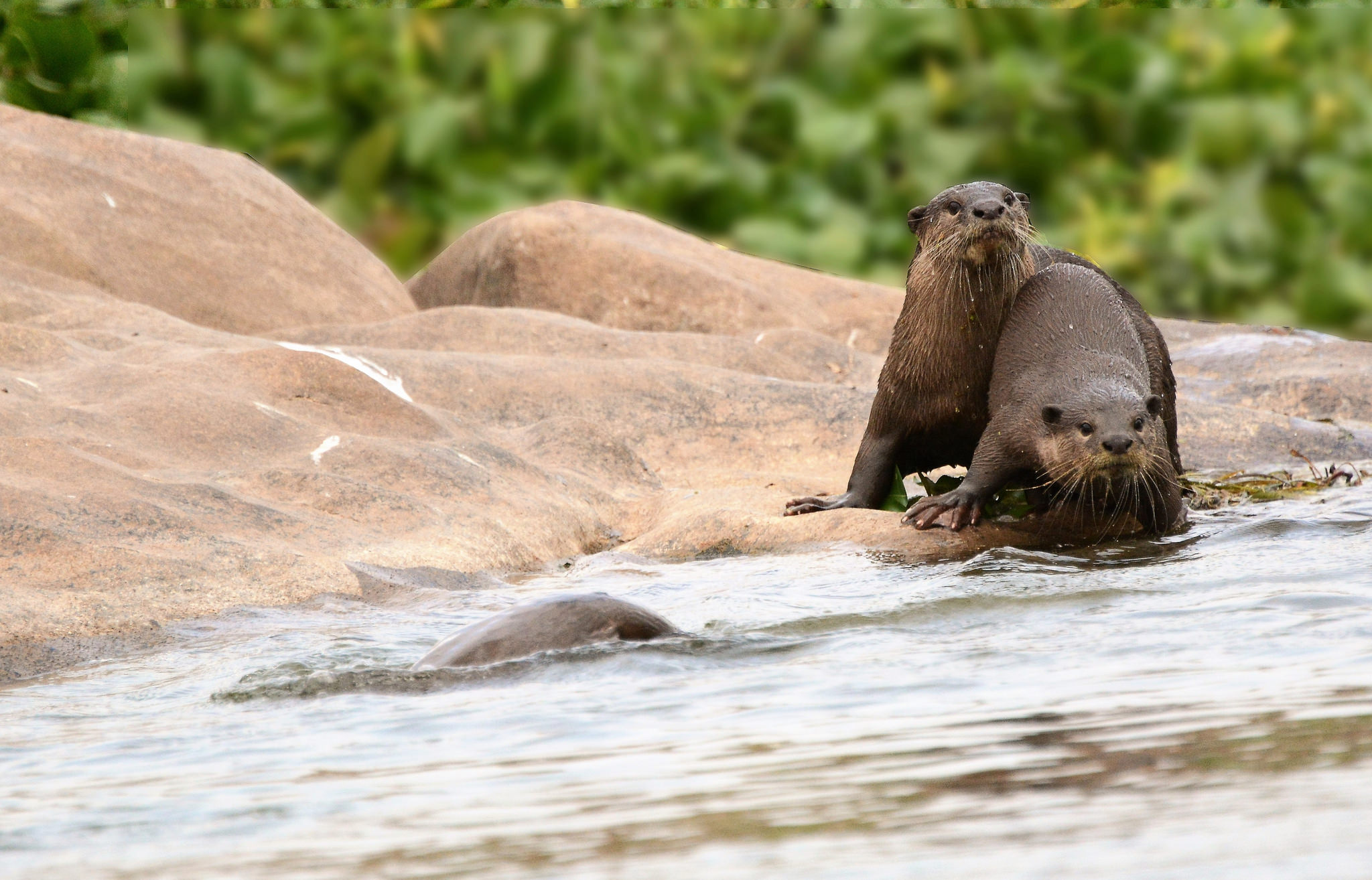

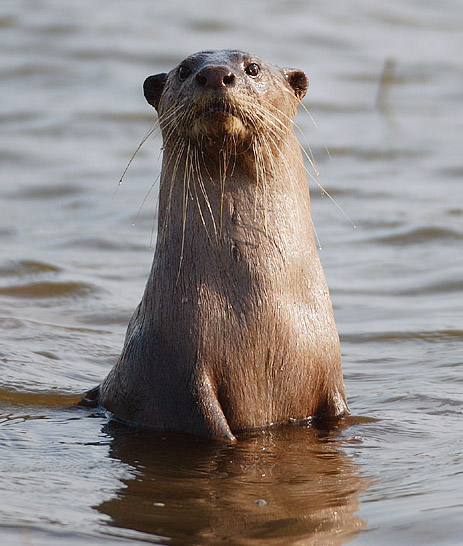

==== Genus: Martes ====
===== Species: Martes gwatkinsii (Nilgiri marten / മരനായ) =====
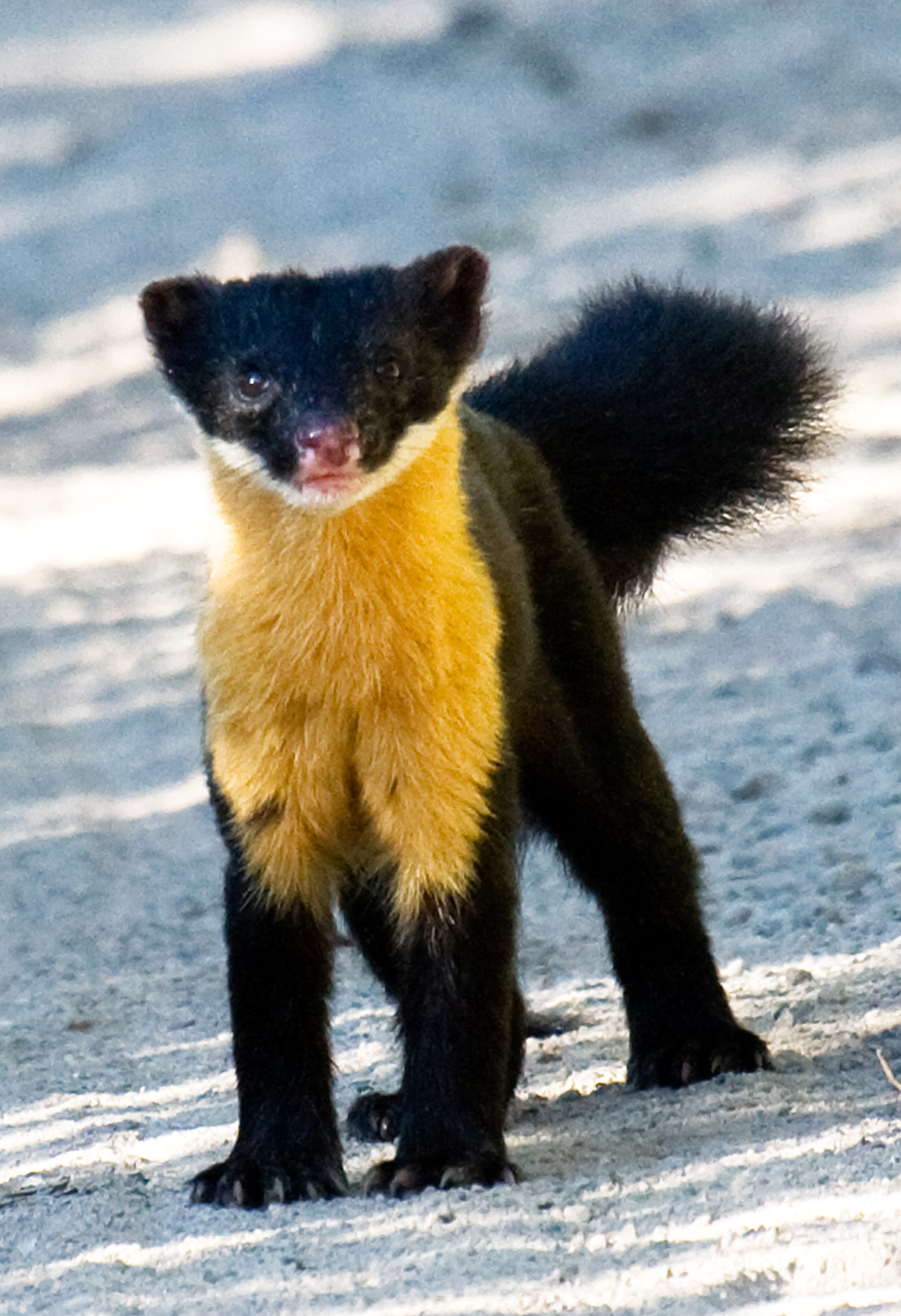

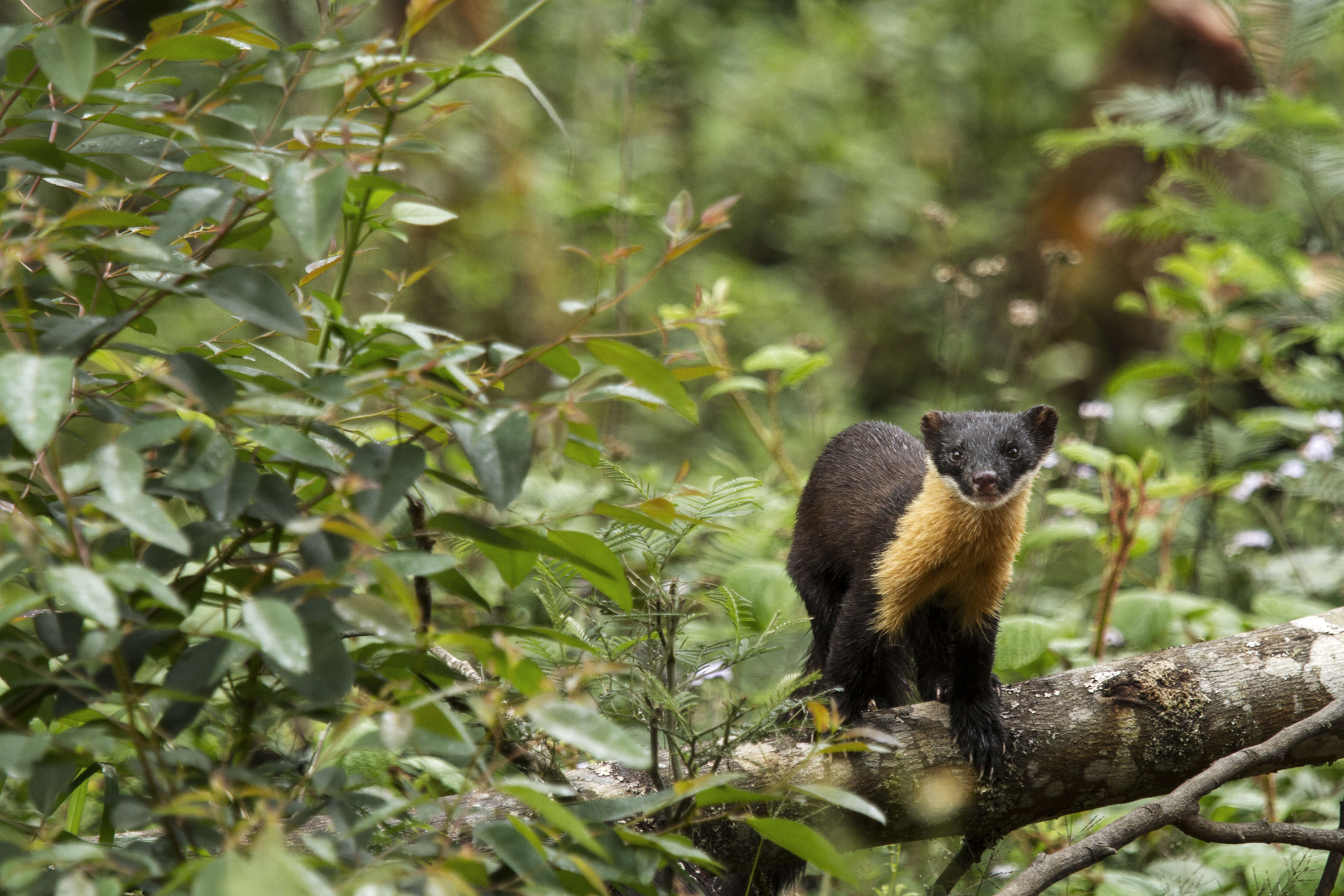

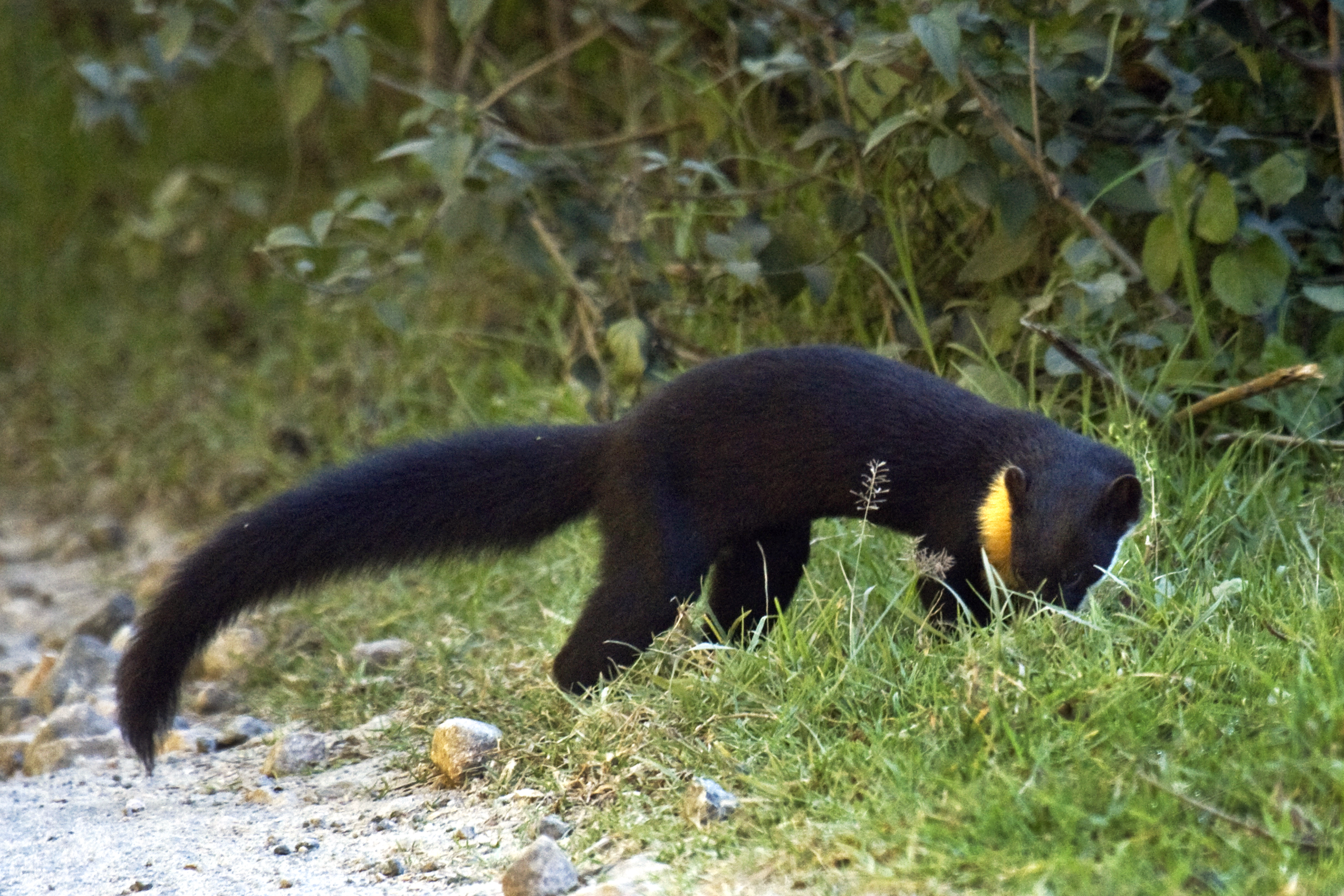

=== Family: Ursidae ===
==== Genus: Melursus ====
===== Species: Melursus ursinus (sloth bear / തേൻകരടി) =====
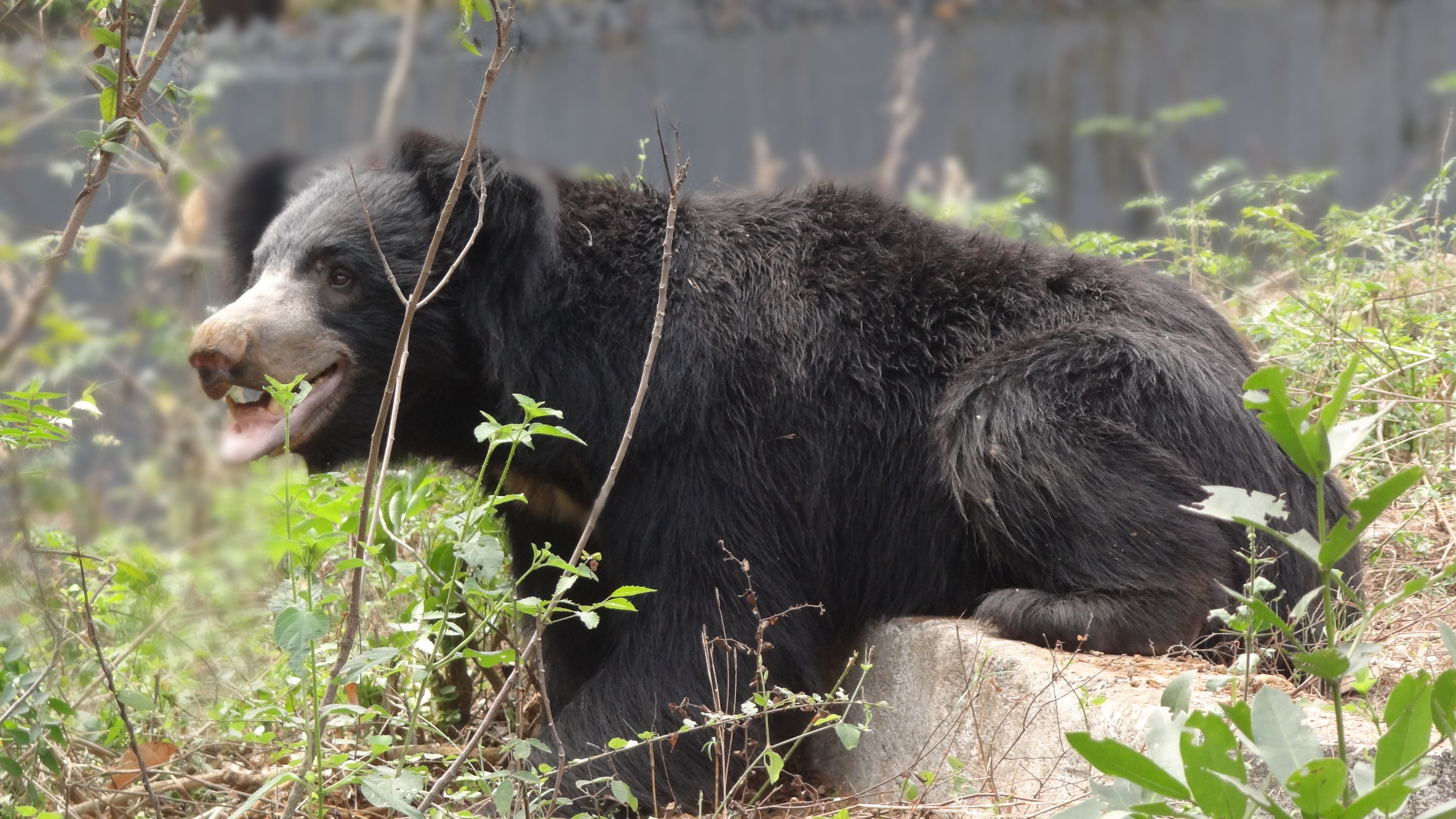

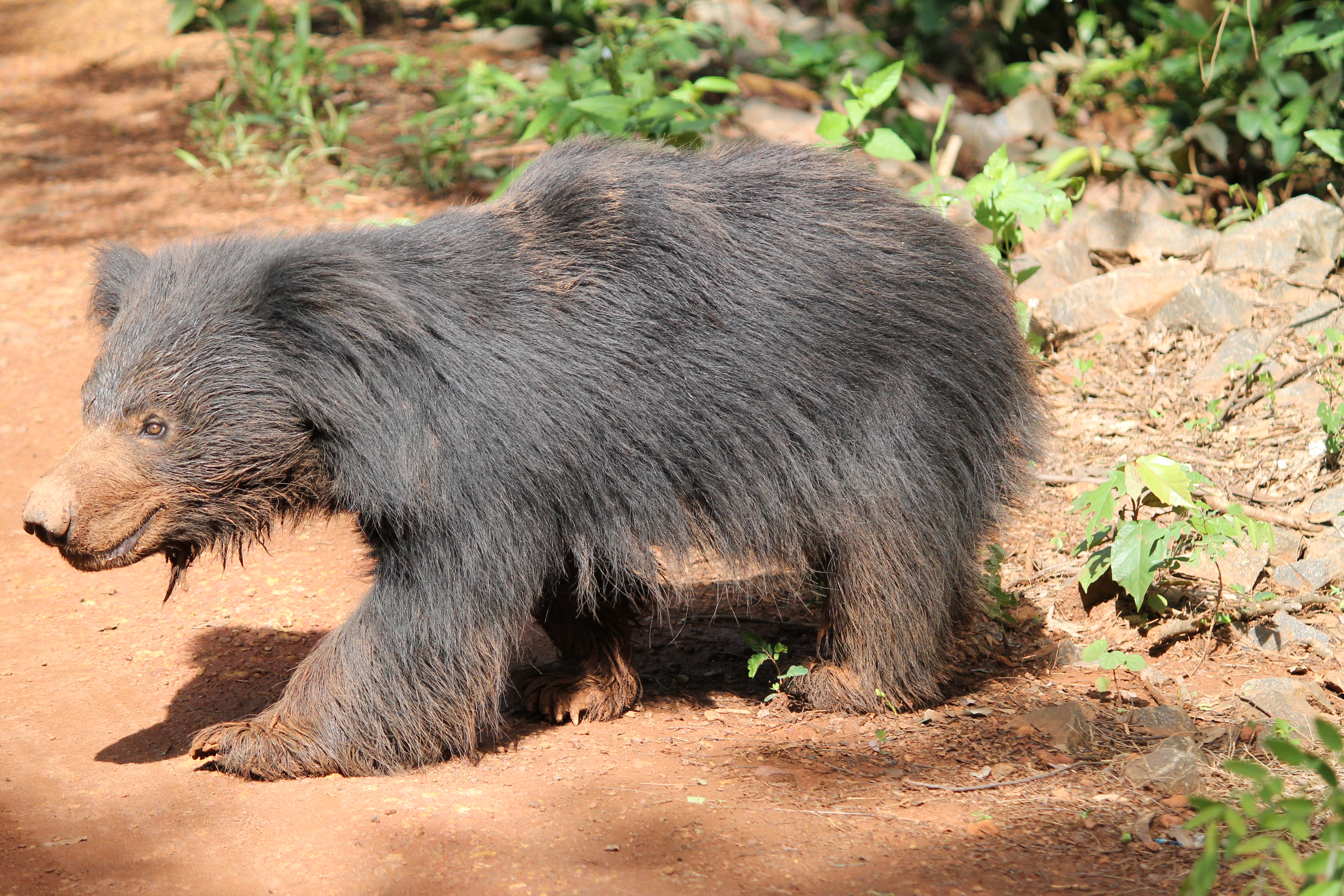

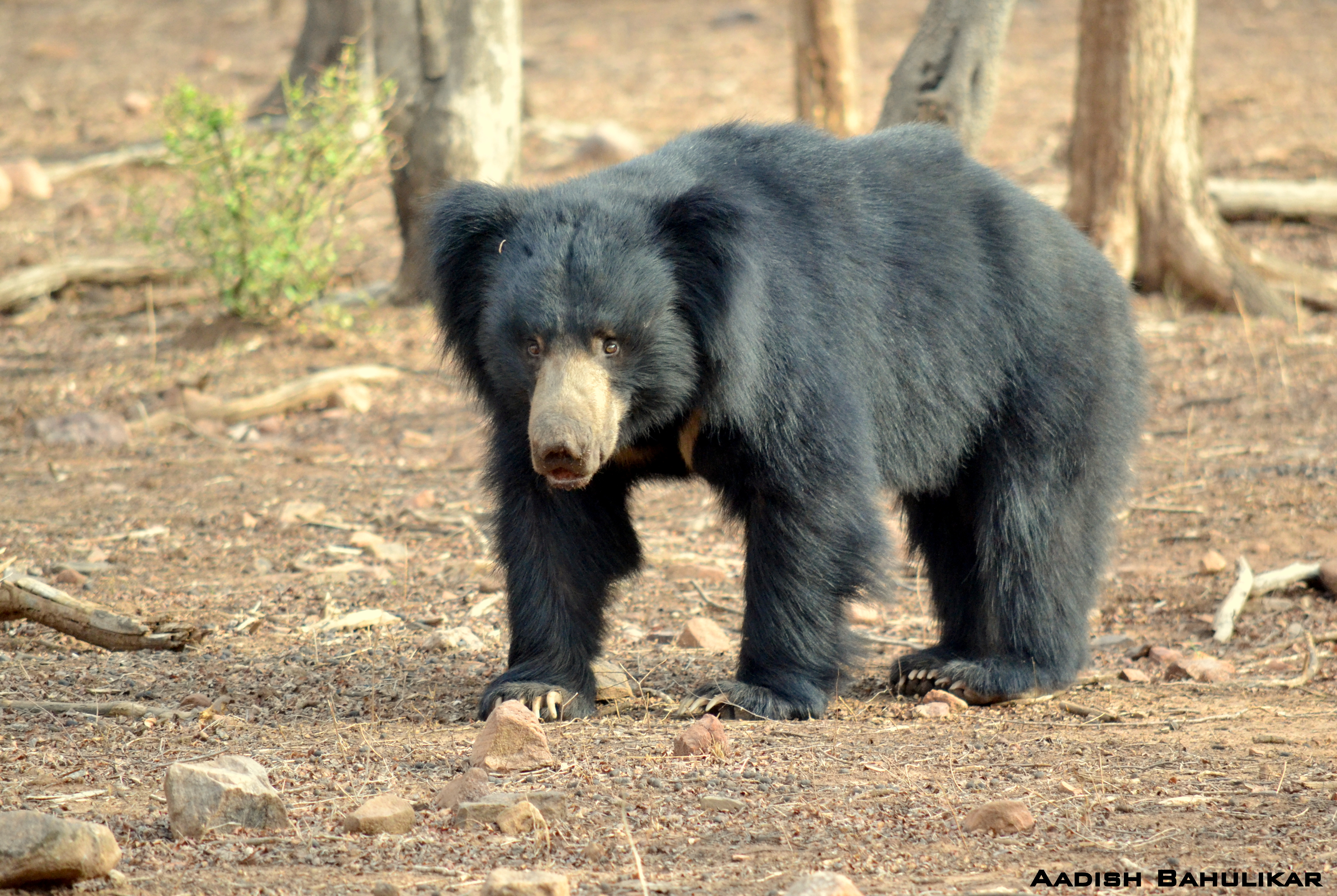

=== Family: Viverridae ===
==== Genus: Paradoxurus ====
===== Species: Paradoxurus hermaphroditus (Asian palm civet / മരപ്പട്ടി) =====
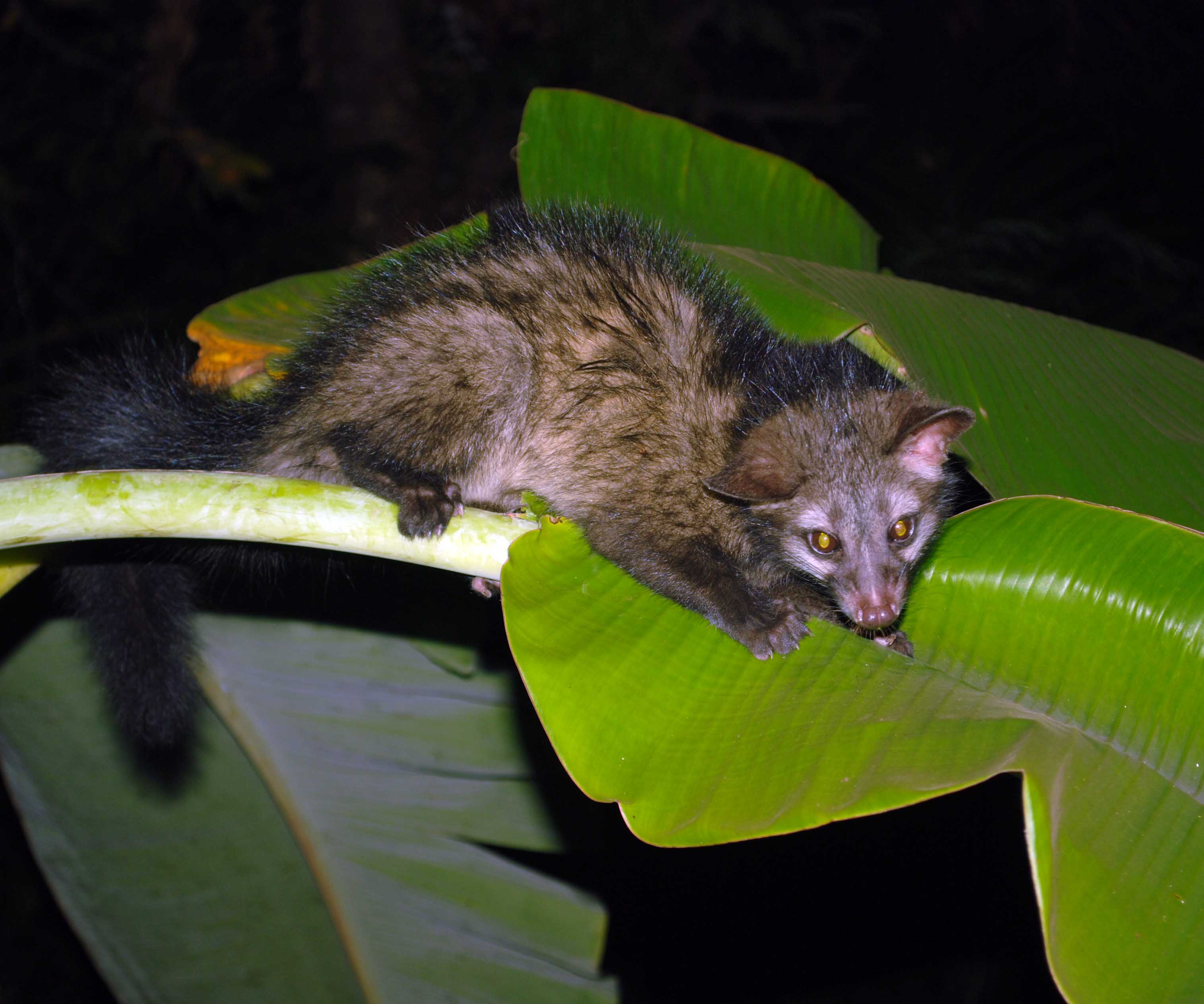

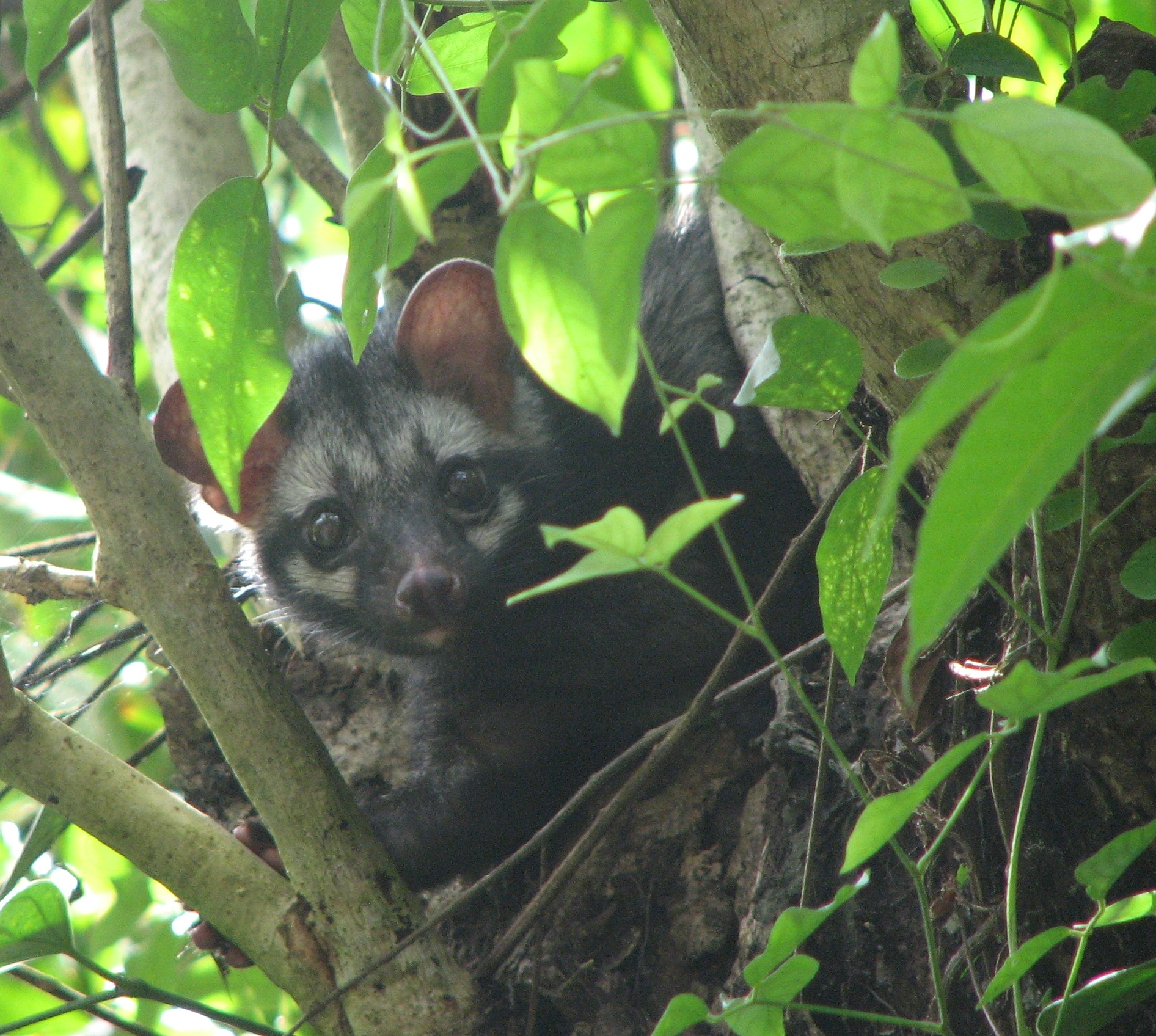

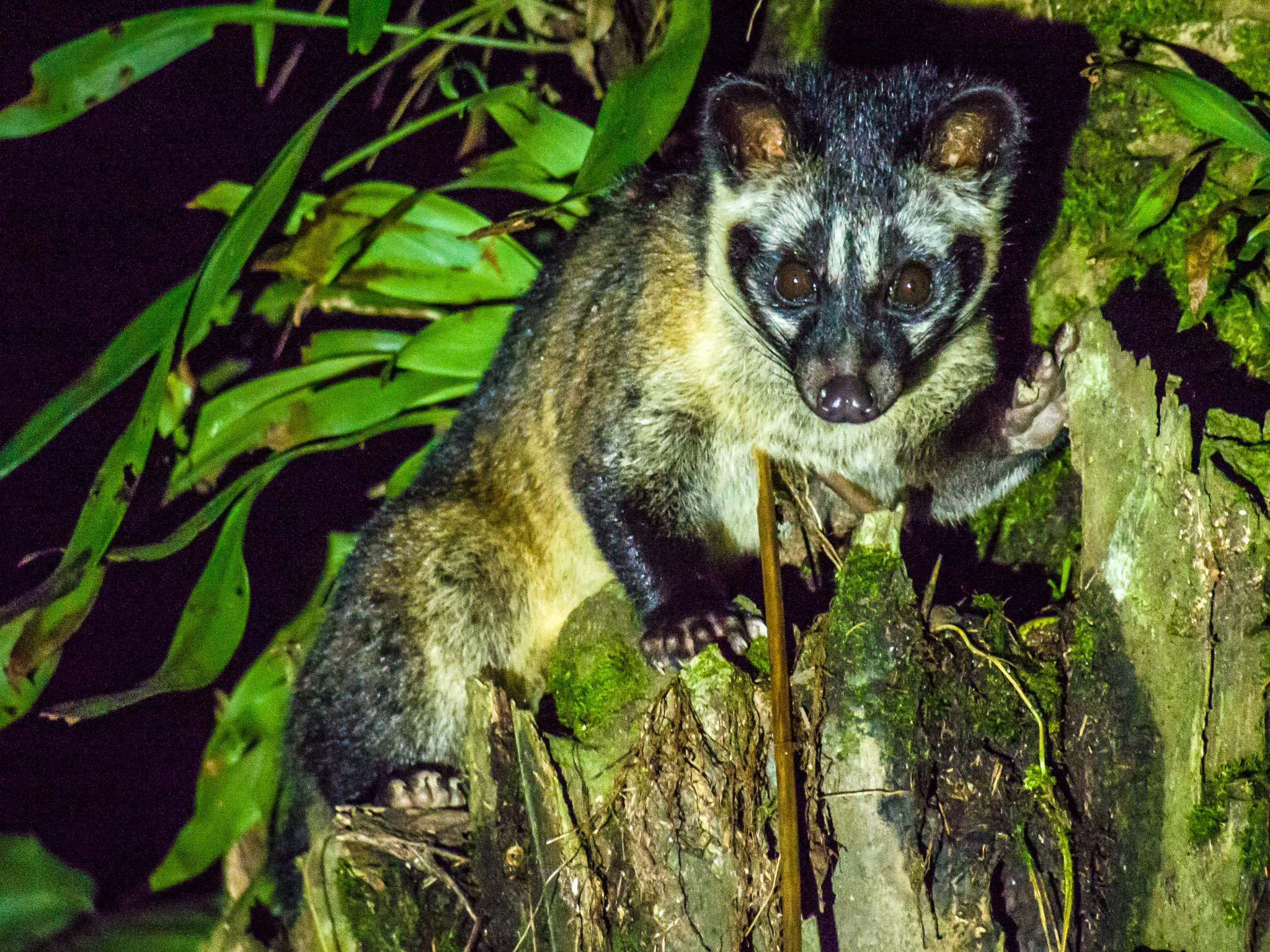

===== Species: Paradoxurus jerdoni (brown palm civet / തവിടൻ വെരുക്) =====
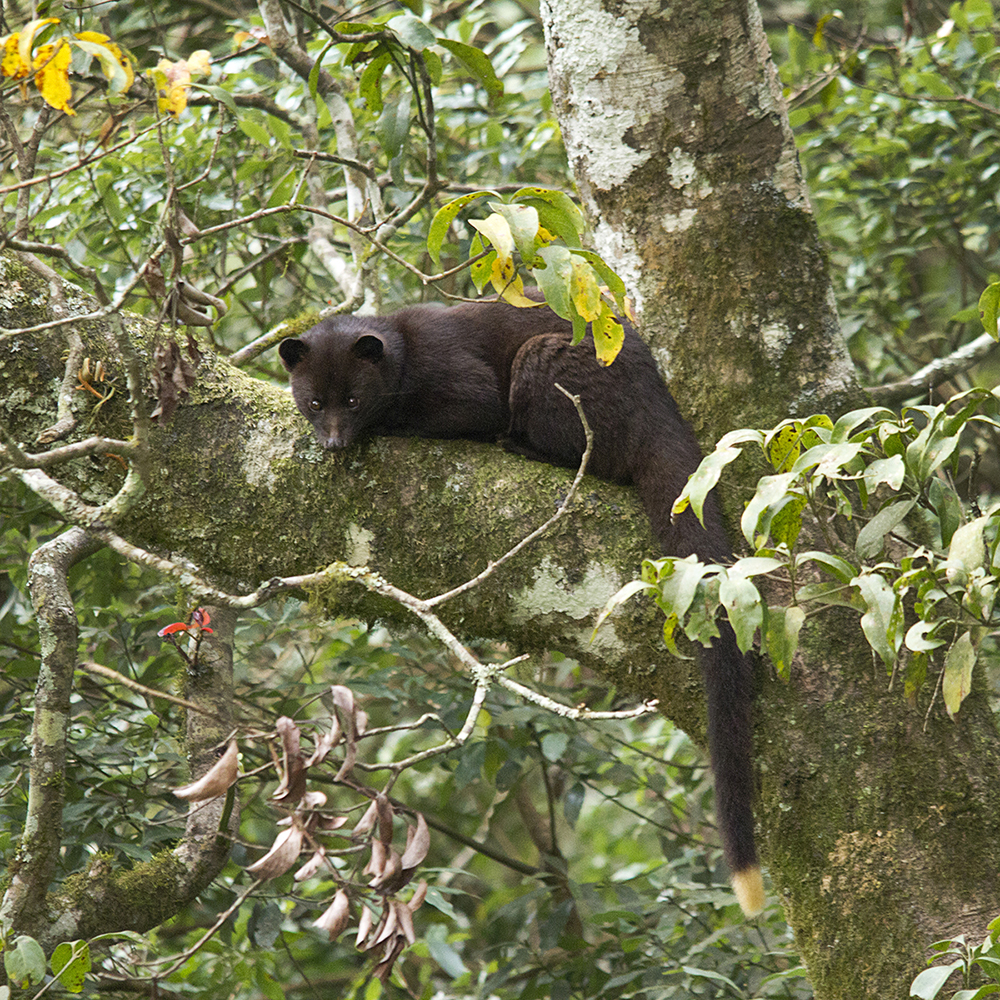

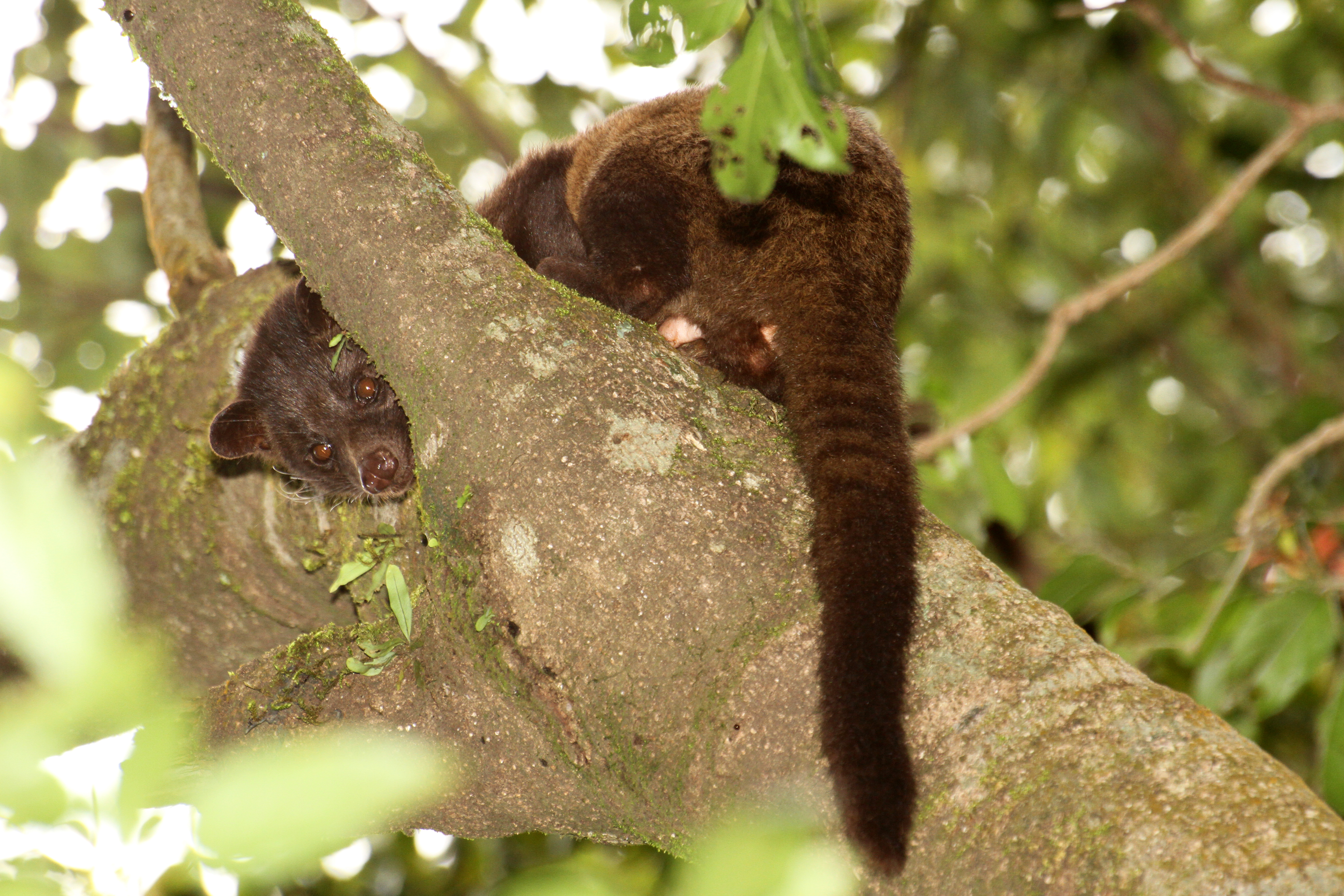

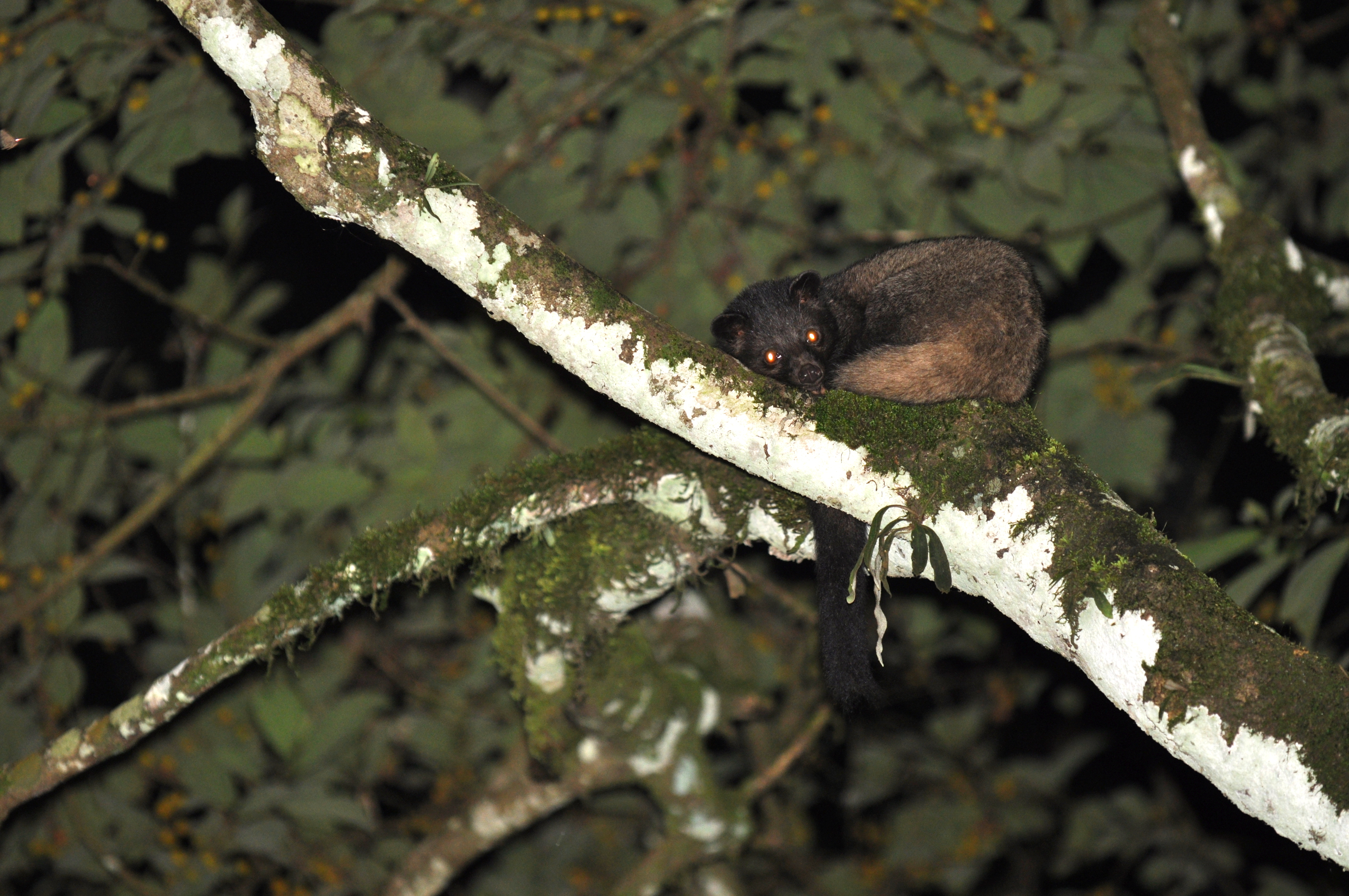

==== Genus: Viverricula ====
===== Species: Viverricula indica (small Indian civet / പൂവെരുക്) =====
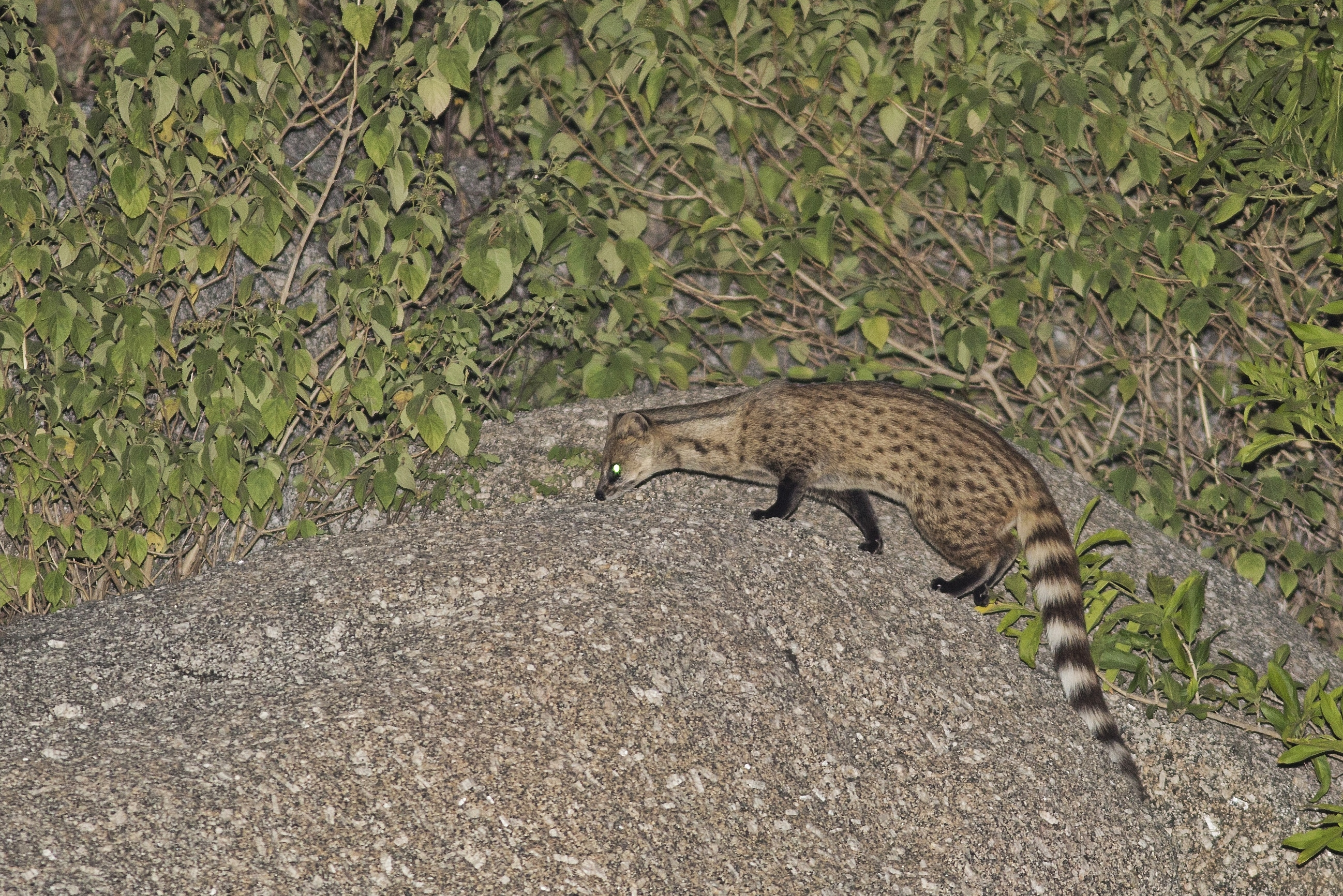

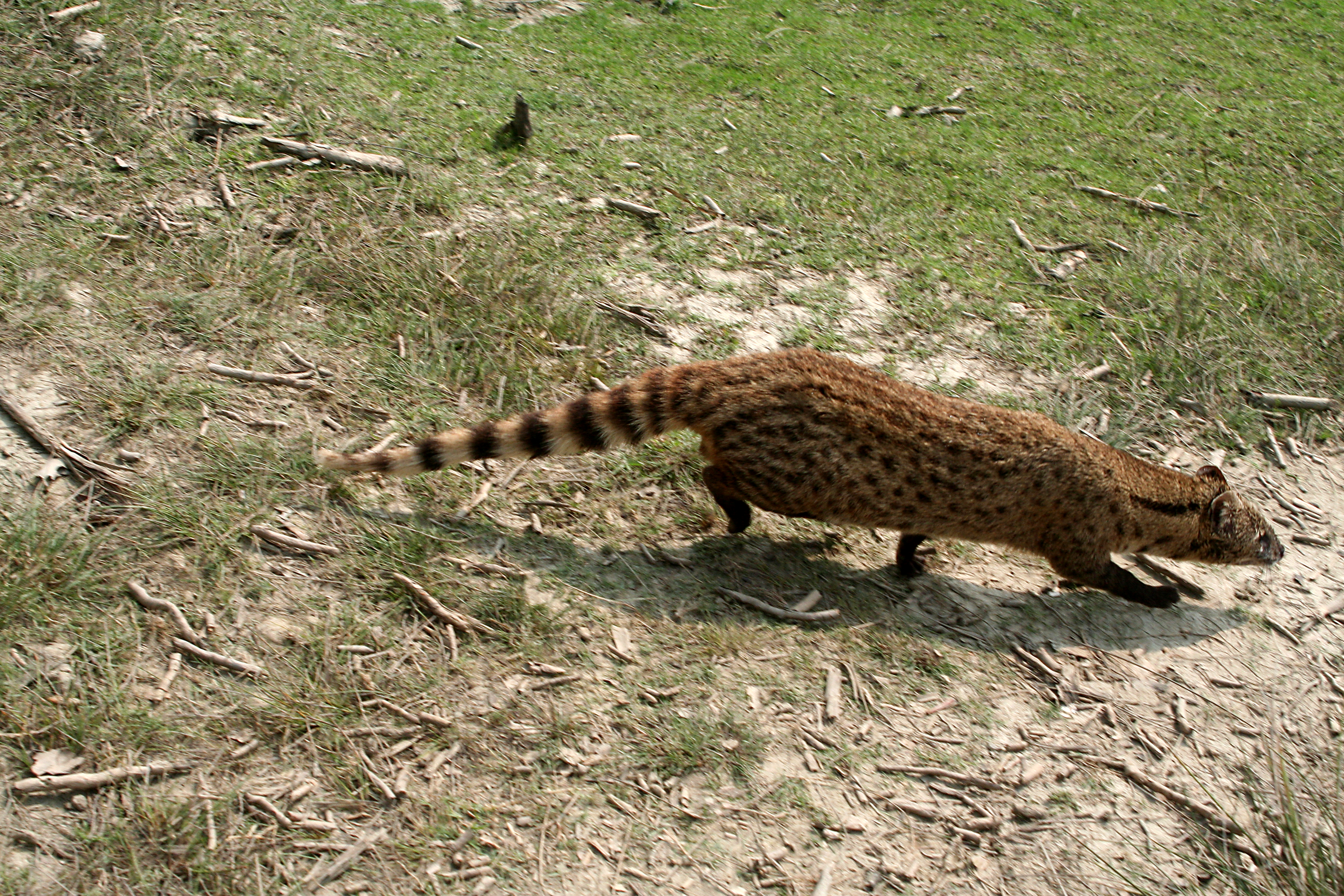

== Order: Cetacea ==
=== Family: Balaenopteridae ===
==== Genus: Balaenoptera ====
===== Species: Balaenoptera acutorostrata (common minke whale / ചെറുതിമിംഗലം) =====
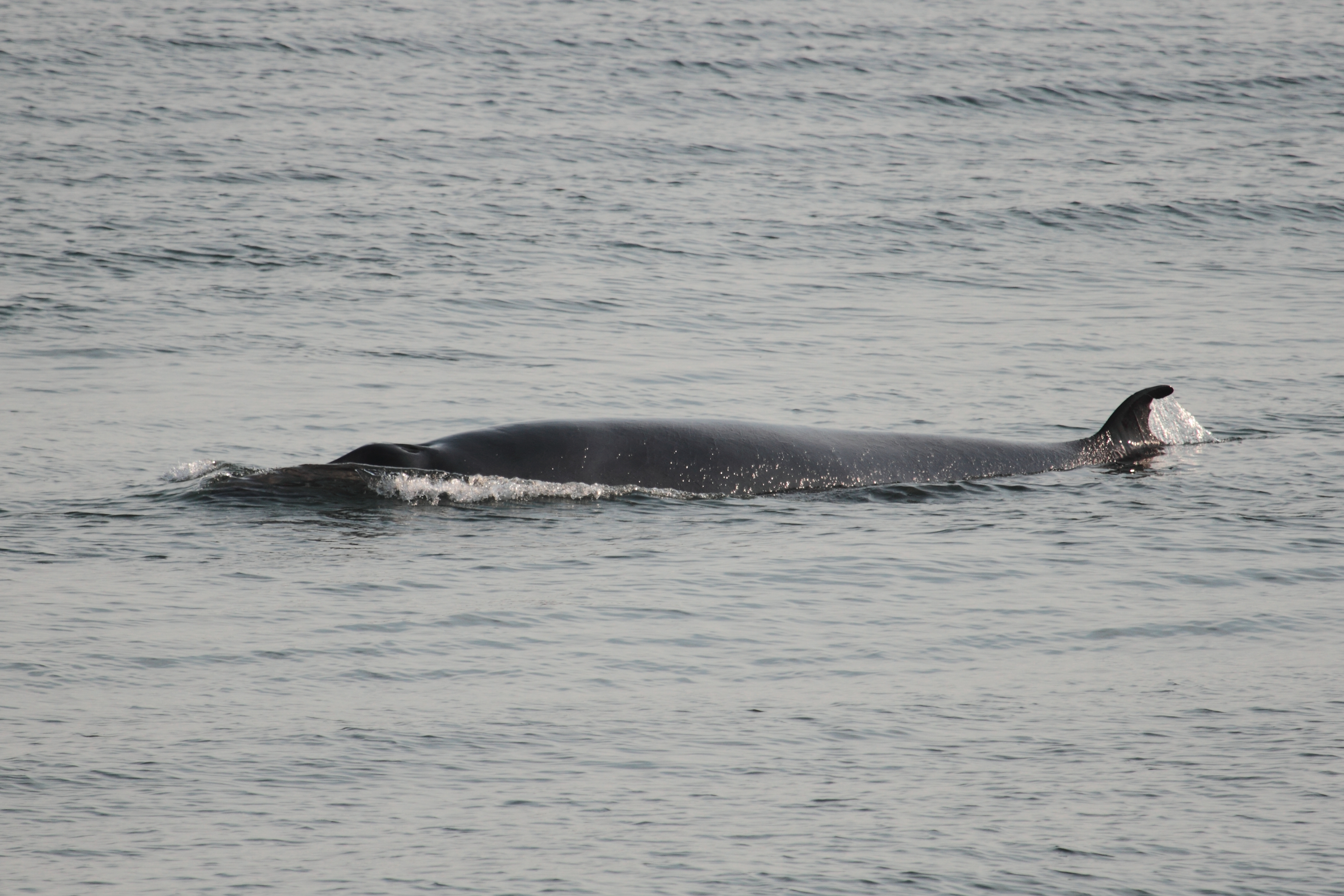

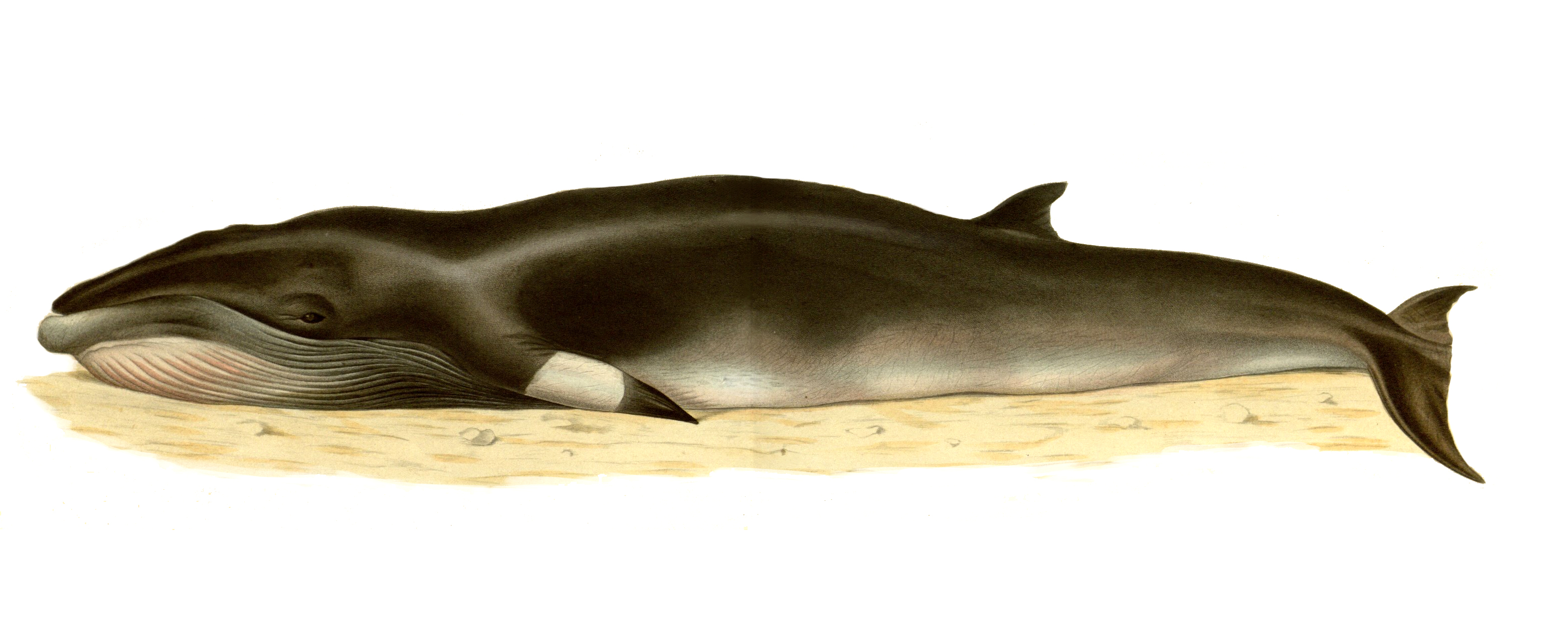

===== Species: Balaenoptera borealis (sei whale / ചാരത്തിമിംഗിലം) =====
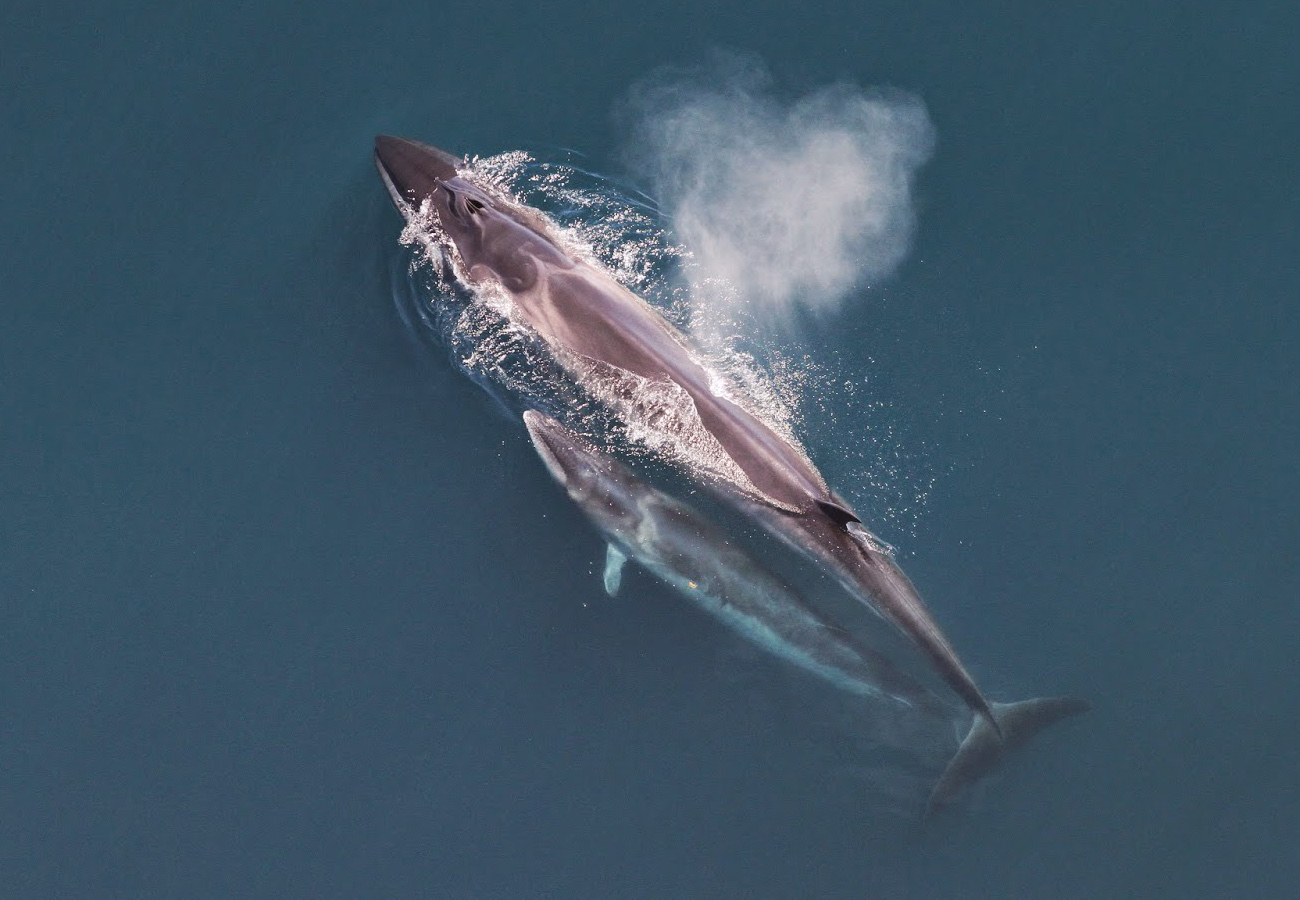

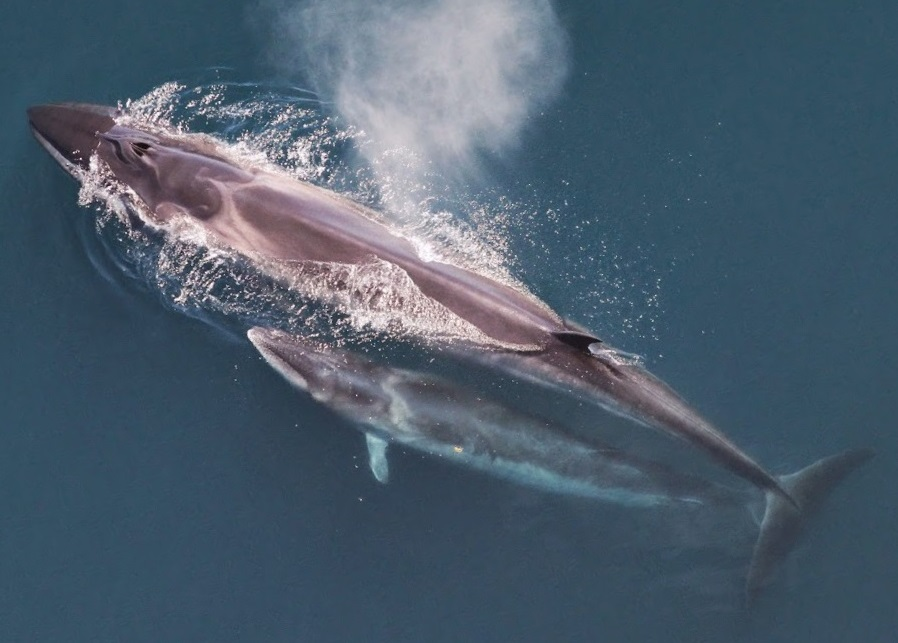

===== Species: Balaenoptera brydei/edeni (Bryde's whale / ബ്രൈഡന്റെ തിമിംഗിലം) =====
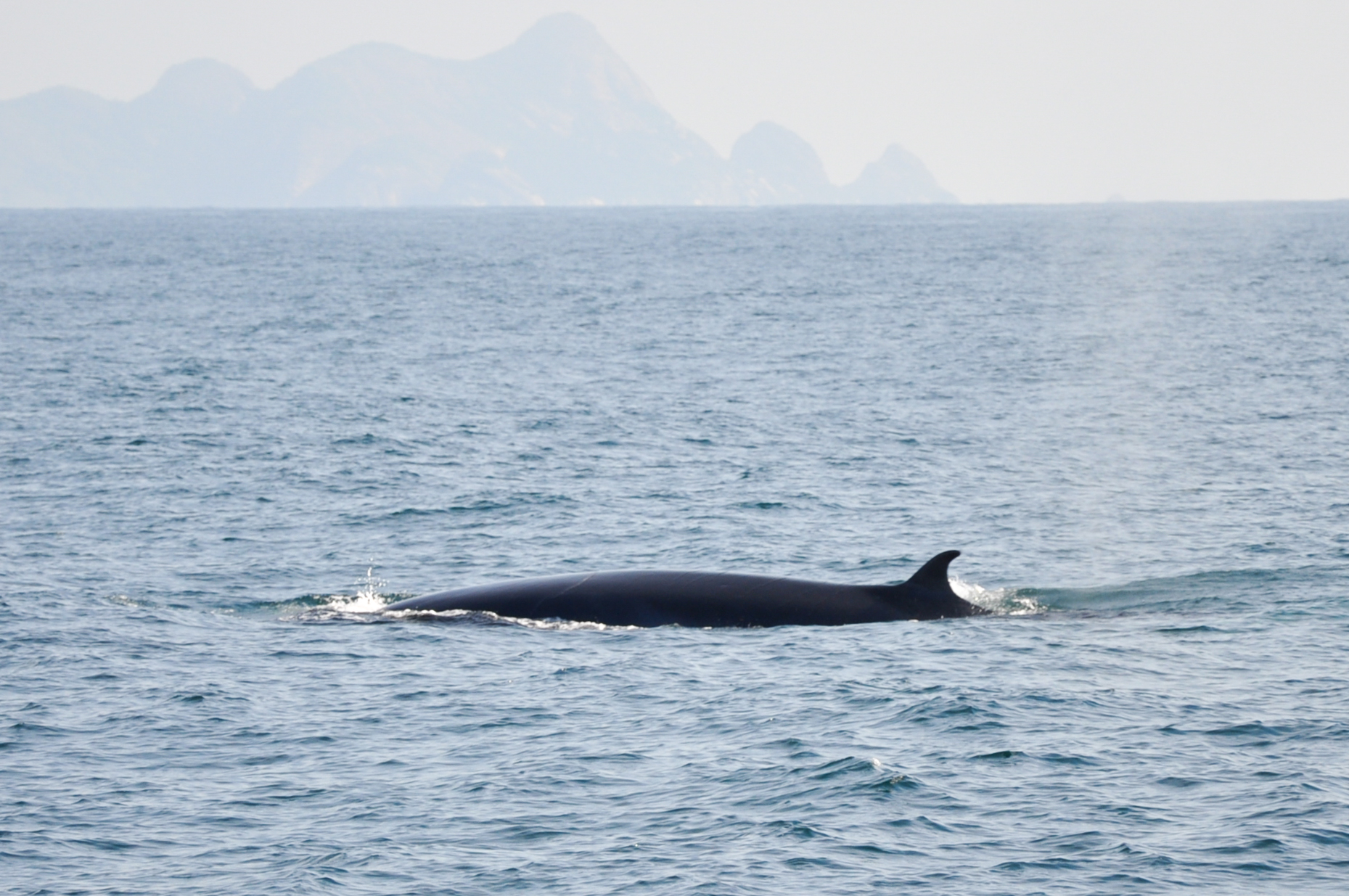

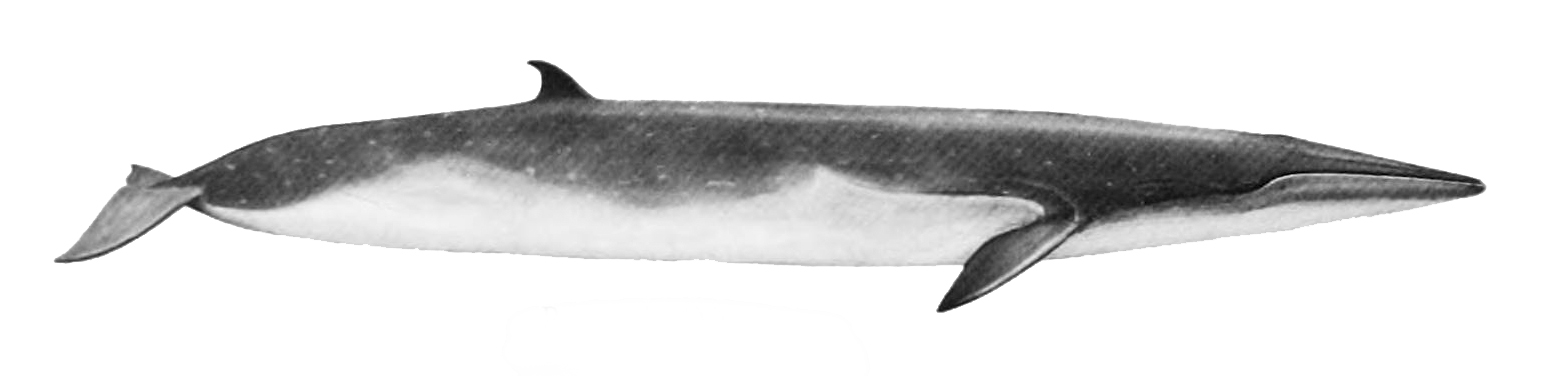

===== Species: Balaenoptera musculus (blue whale / നീലത്തിമിംഗിലം) =====
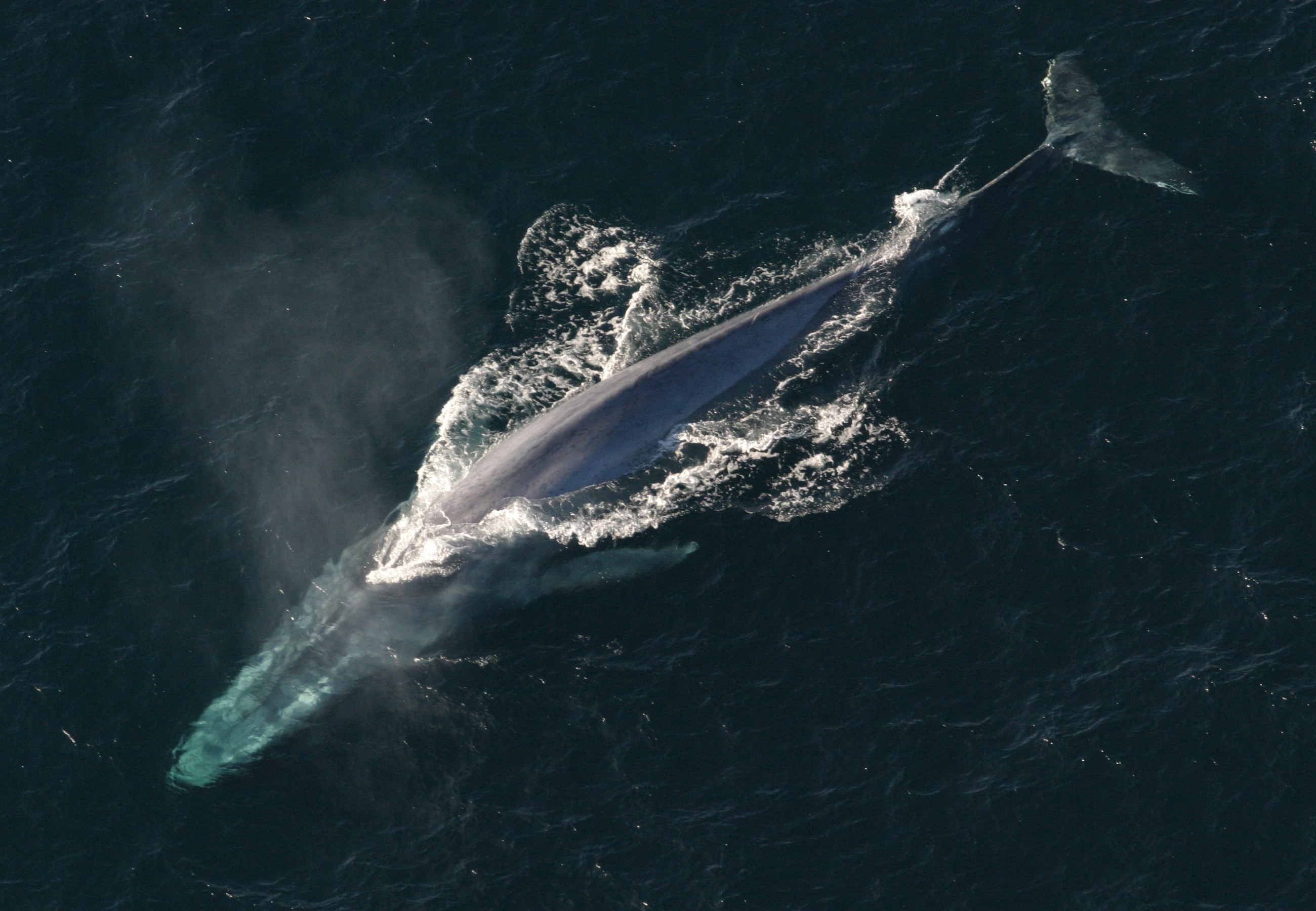

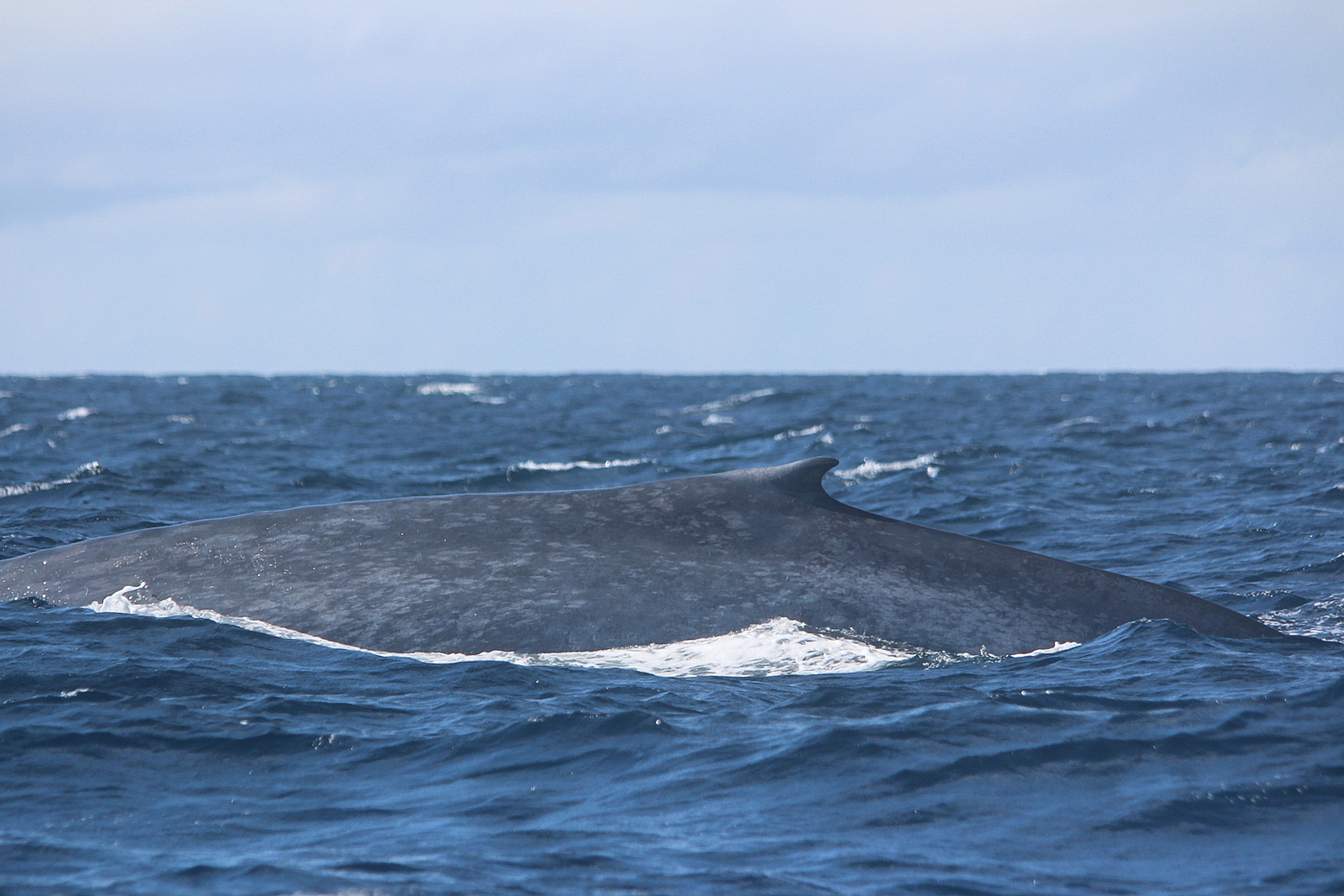

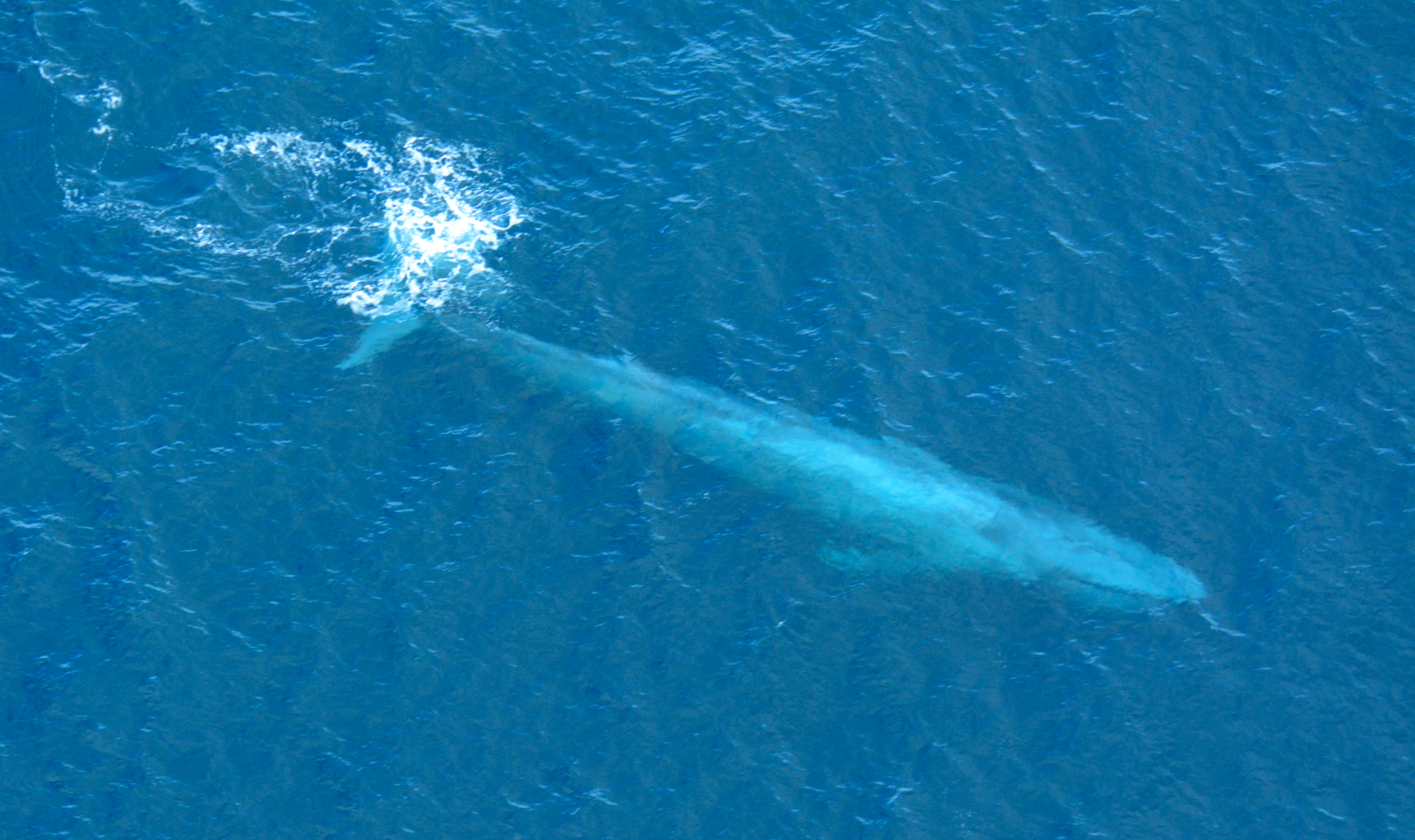

===== Species: Balaenoptera physalus (fin whale / ചിറകൻ തിമിംഗിലം) =====
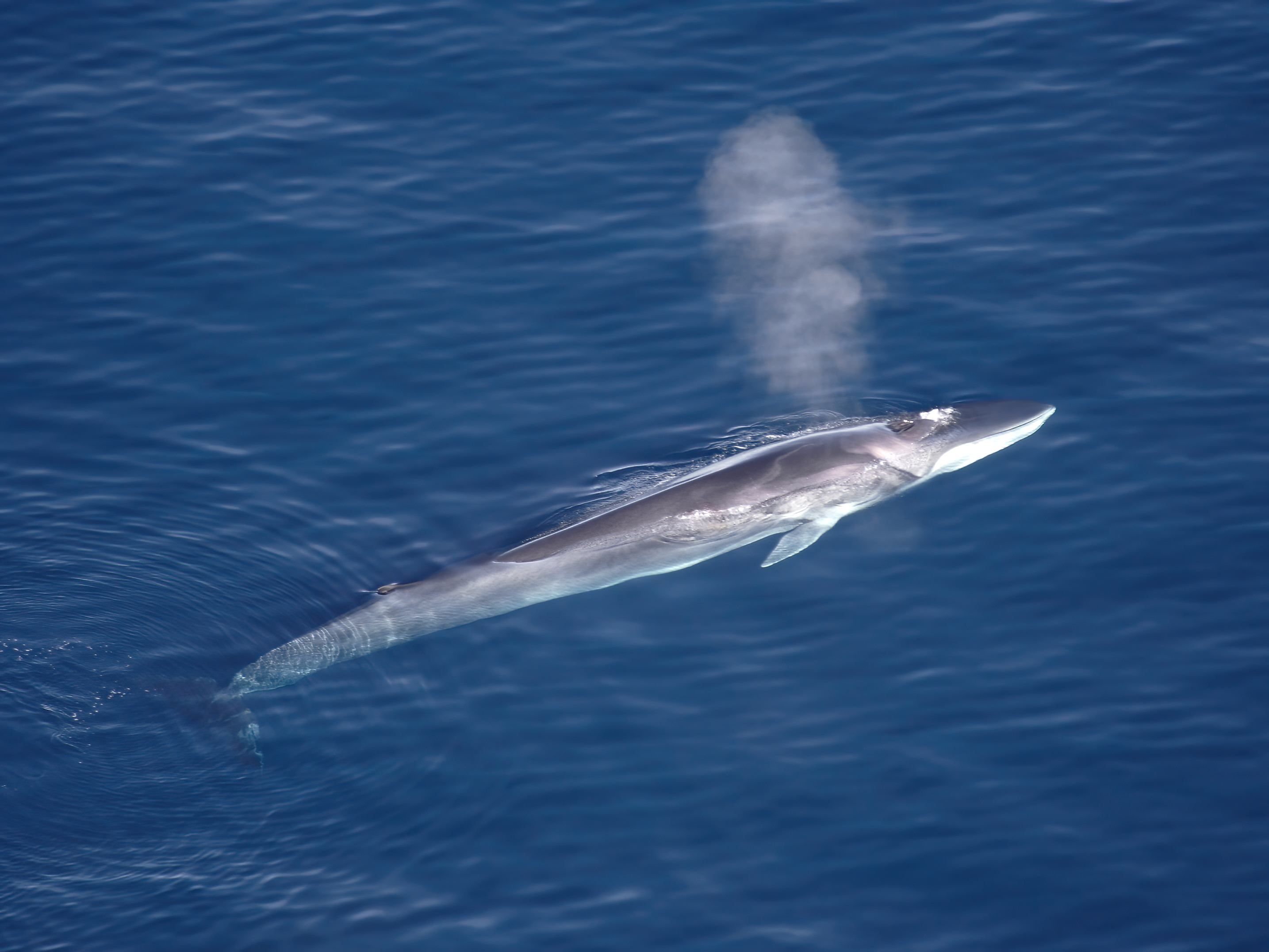

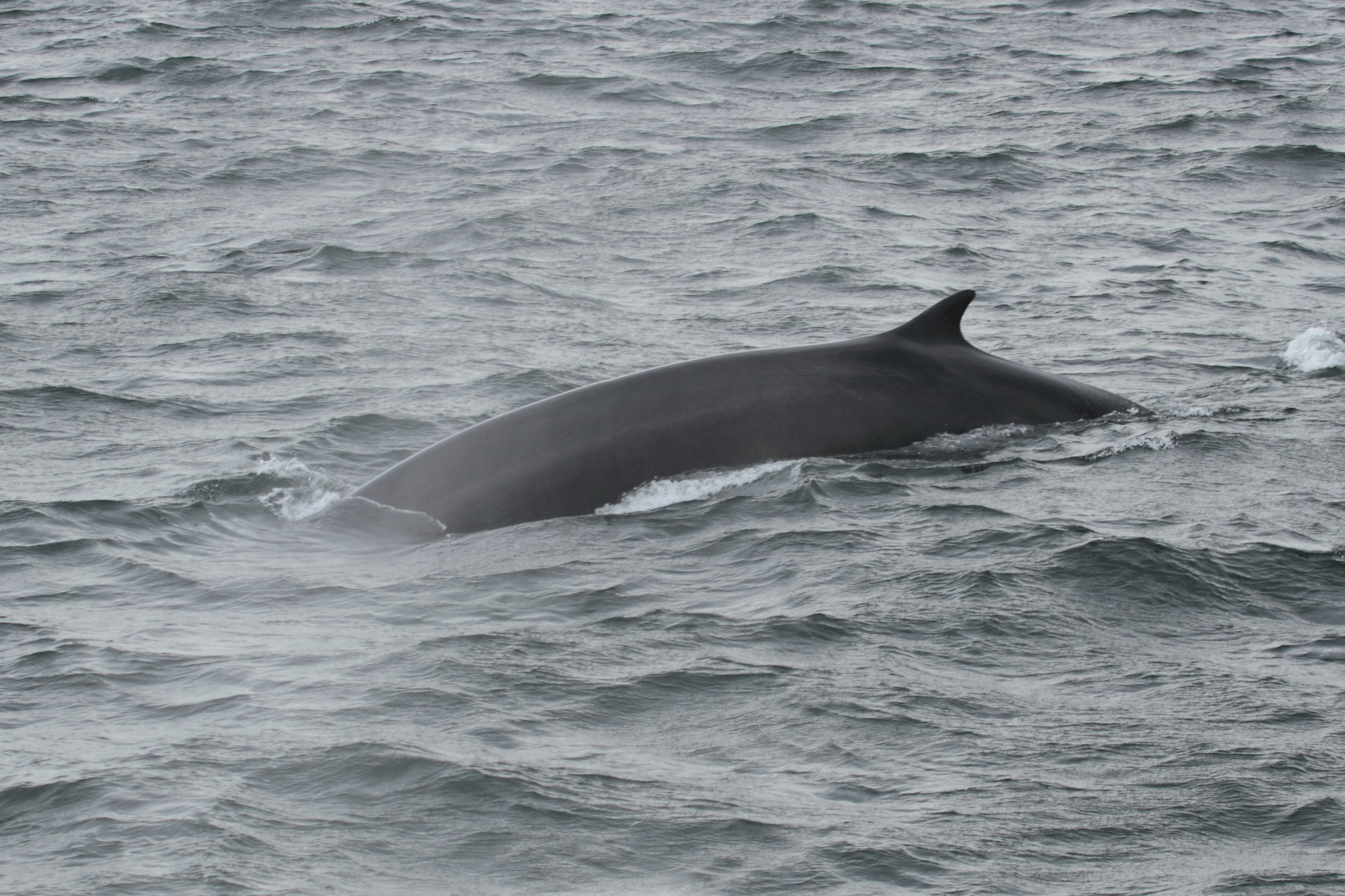

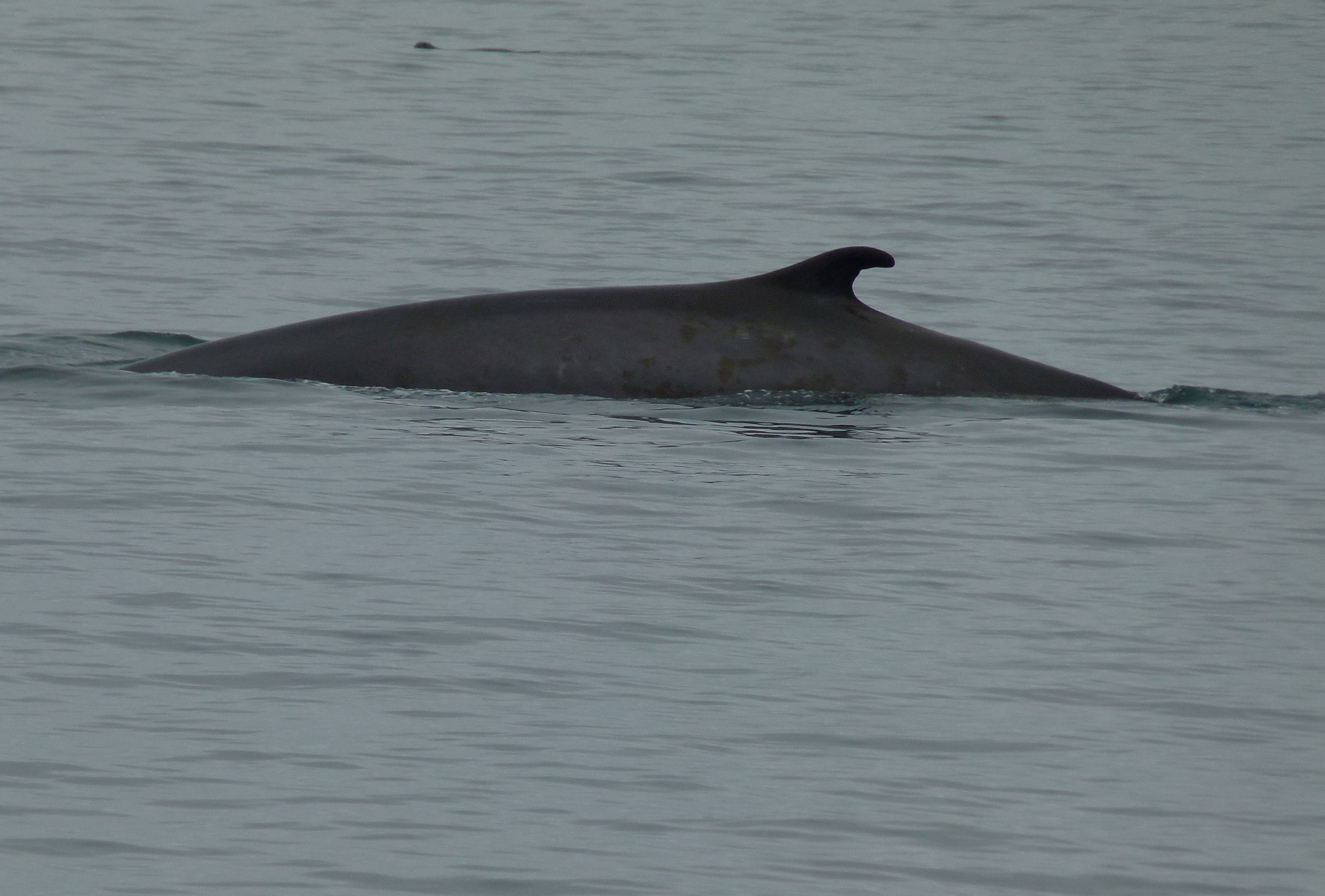

==== Genus: Megaptera ====
===== Species: Megaptera novaeangliae (humpback whale / കൂനൻ തിമിംഗിലം) =====
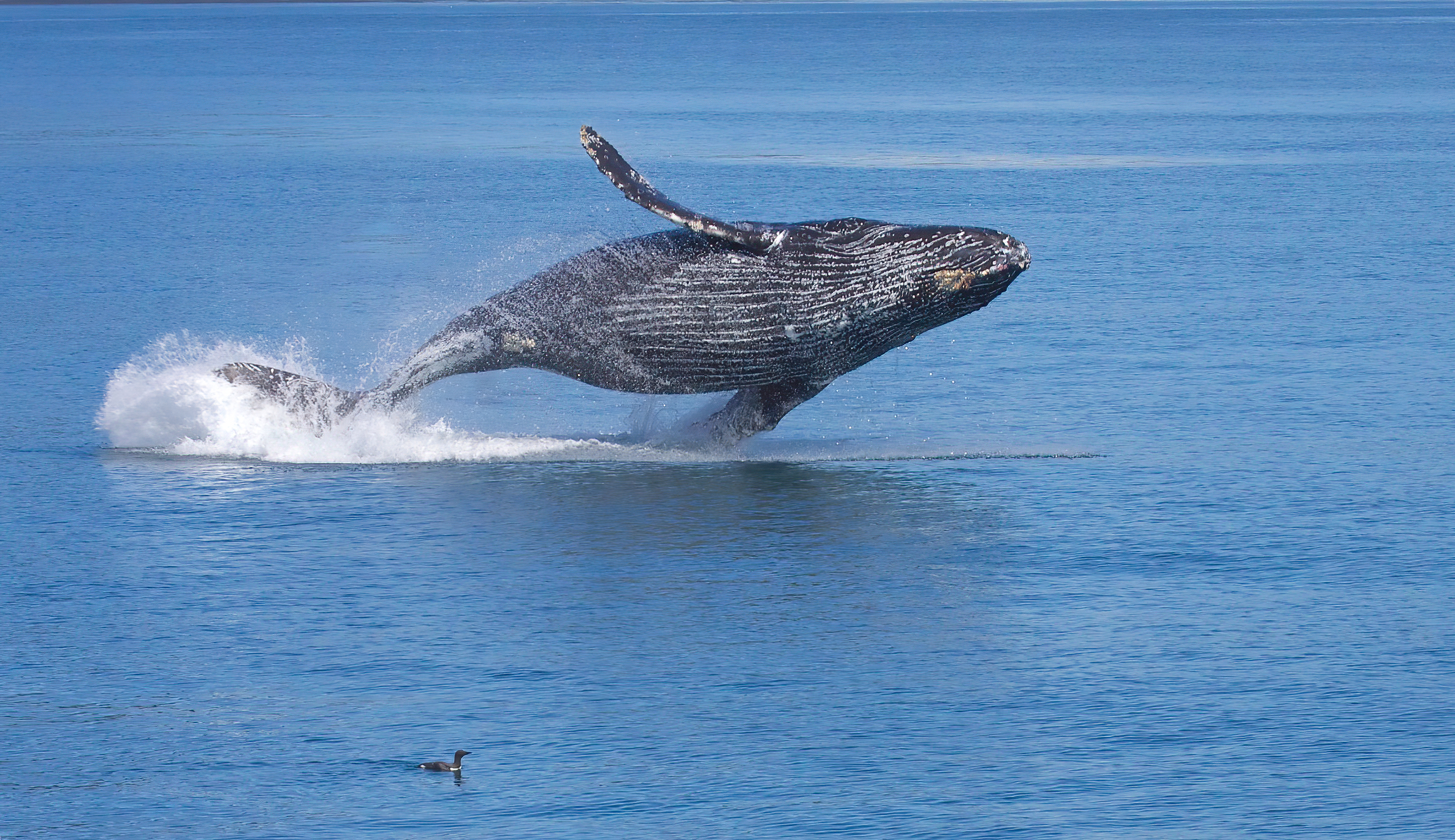

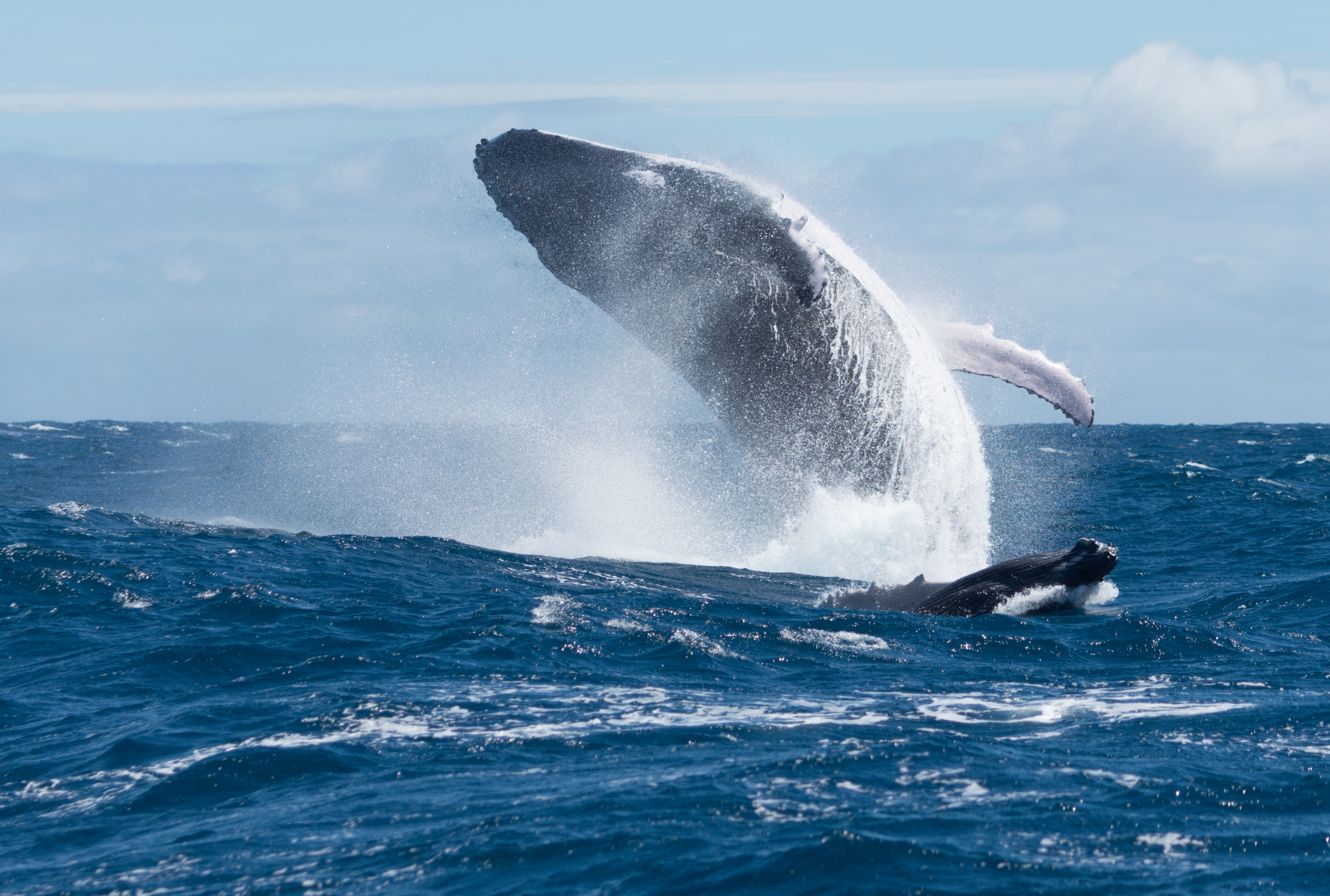

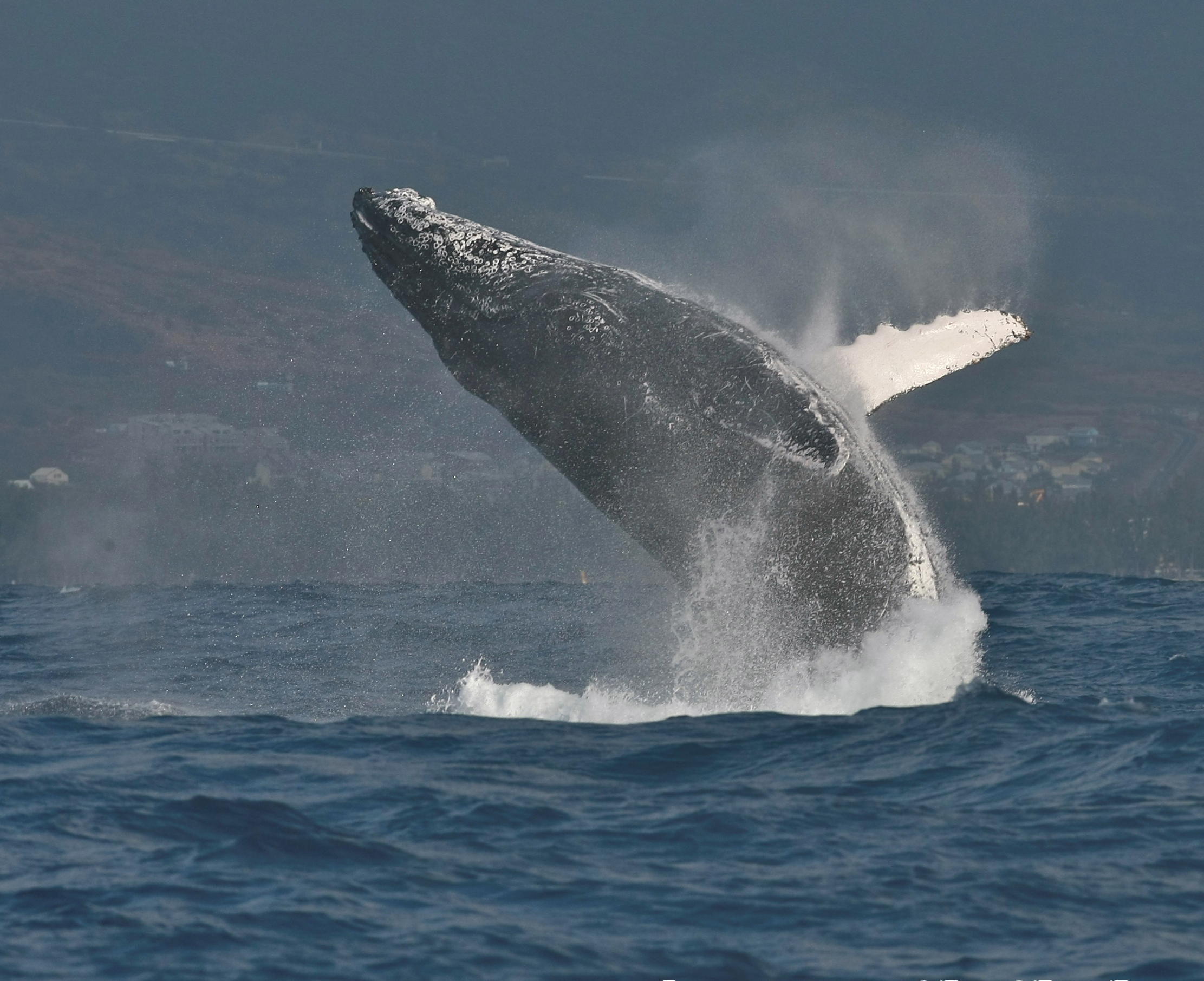

=== Family: Delphinidae ===
==== Genus: Delphinus ====
===== Species: Delphinus capensis (long-beaked common dolphin) =====
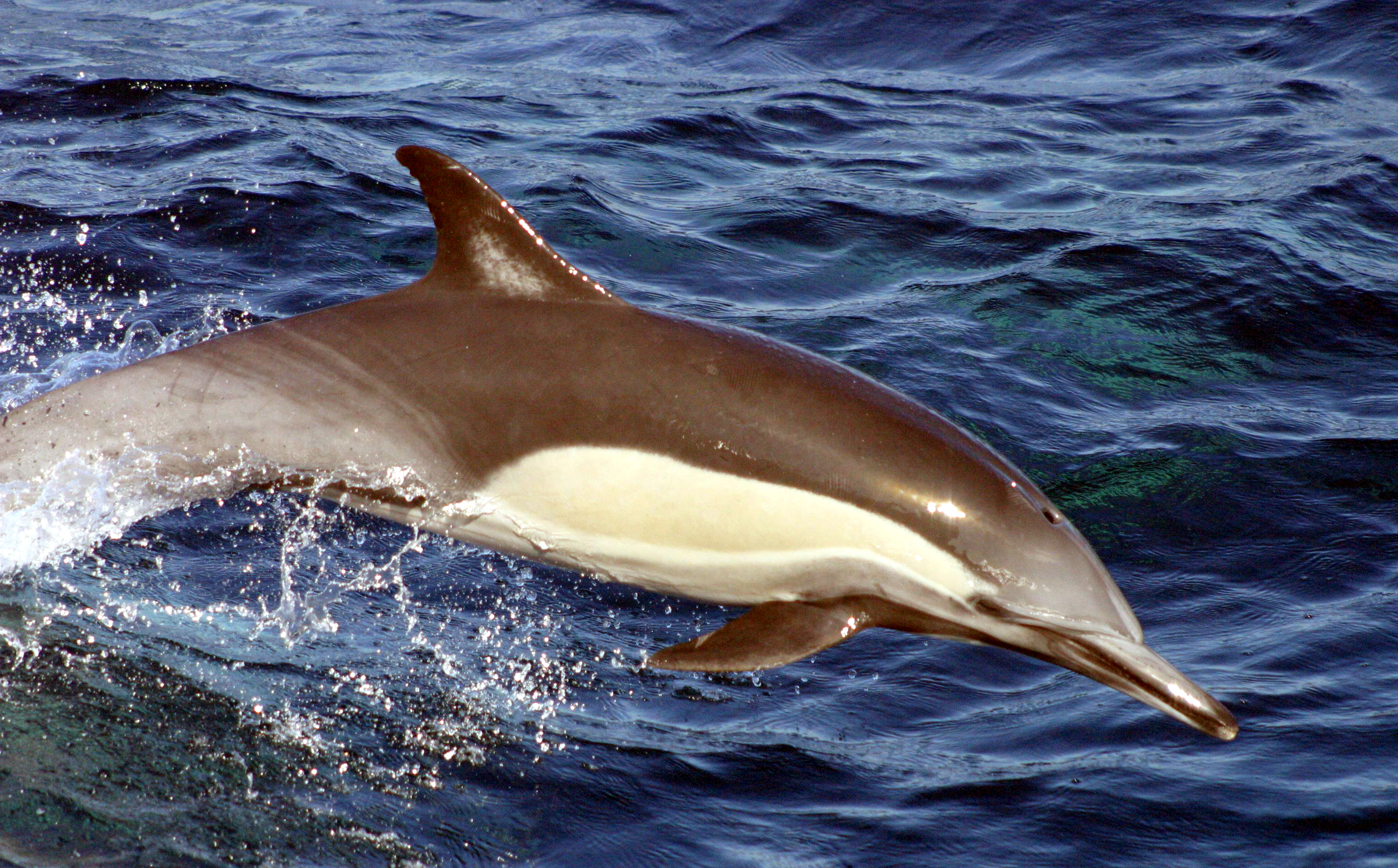

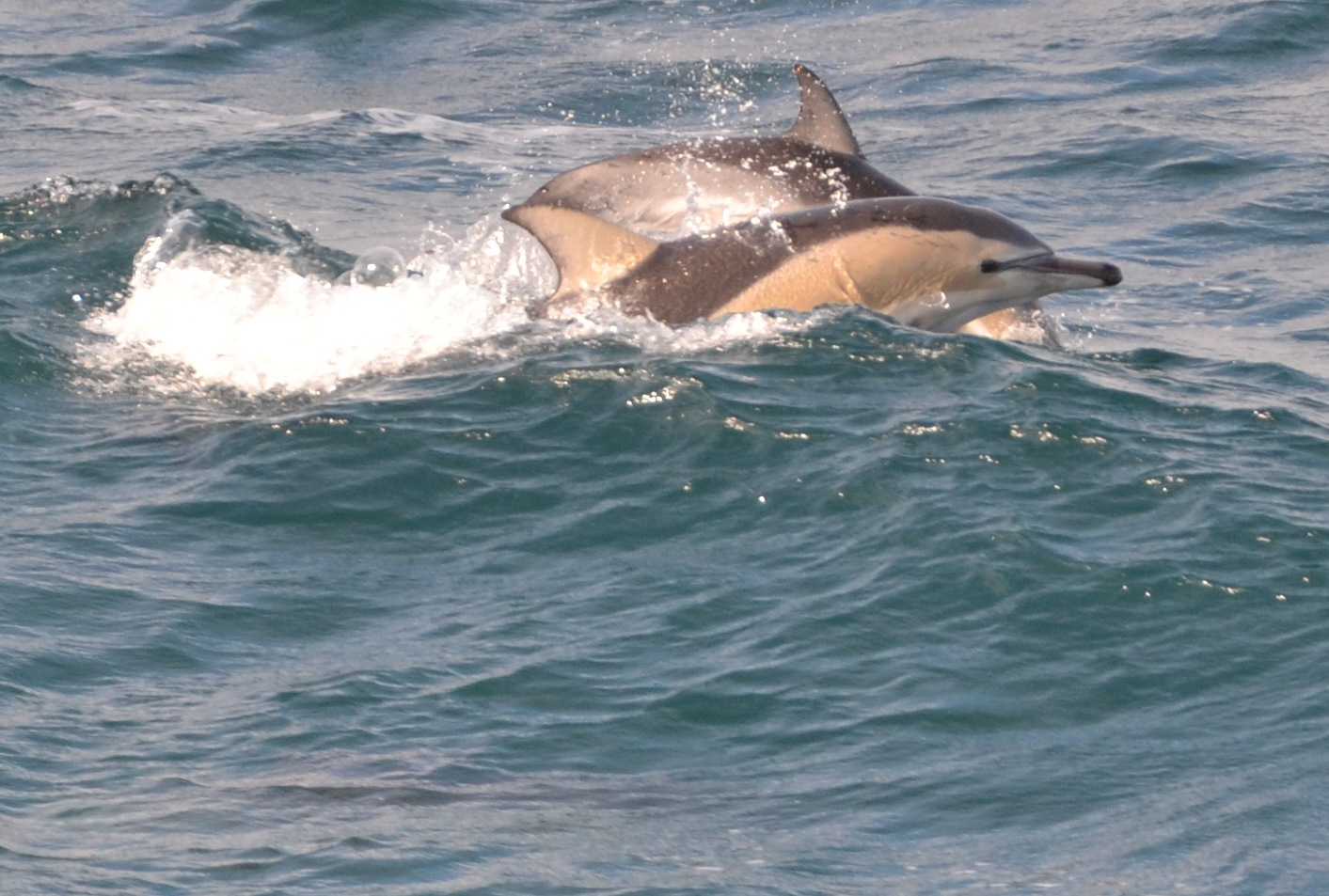

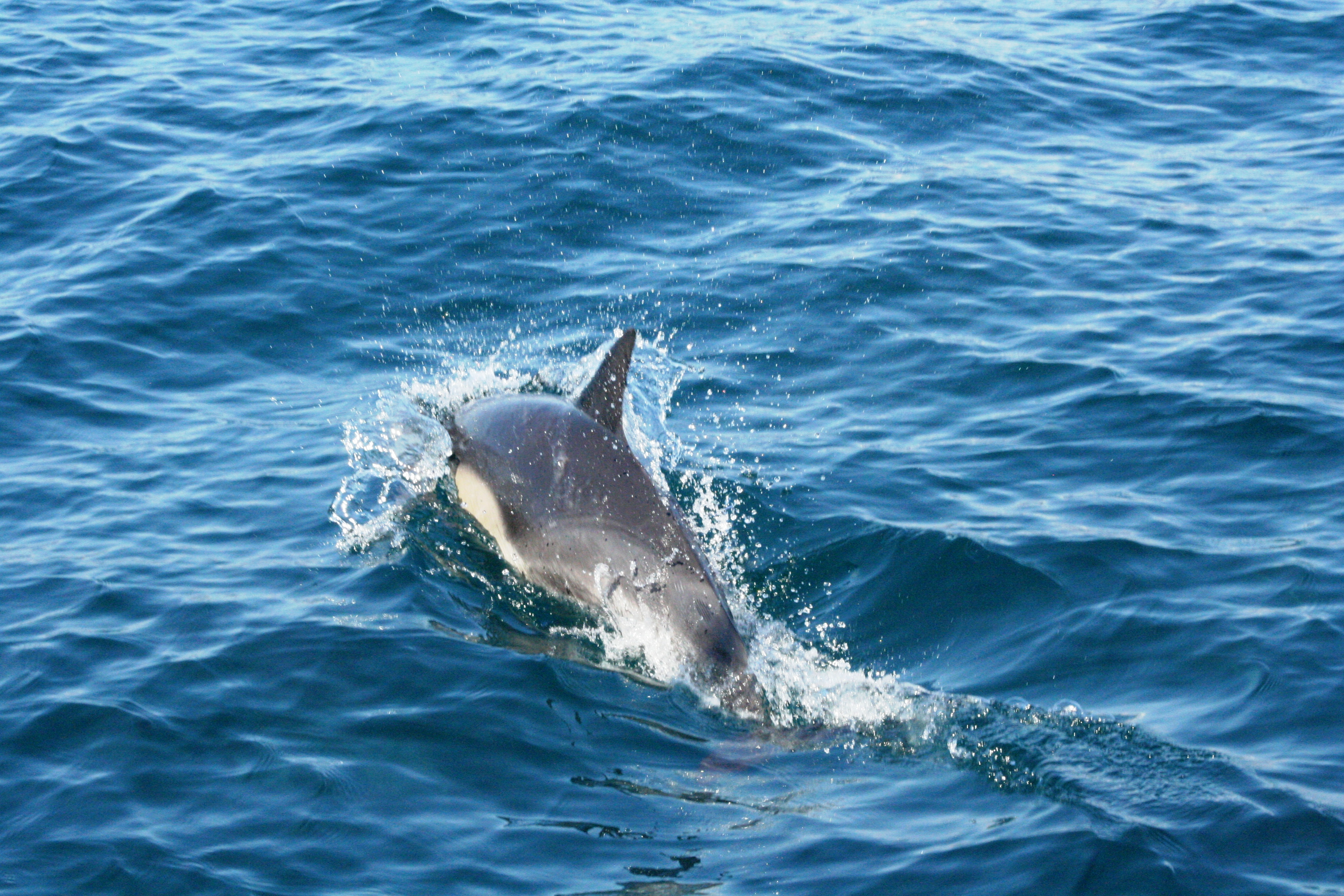

==== Genus: Feresa ====
===== Species: Feresa attenuata (pygmy killer whale / ചിന്ന കൊലയാളിത്തിമിംഗലം) =====
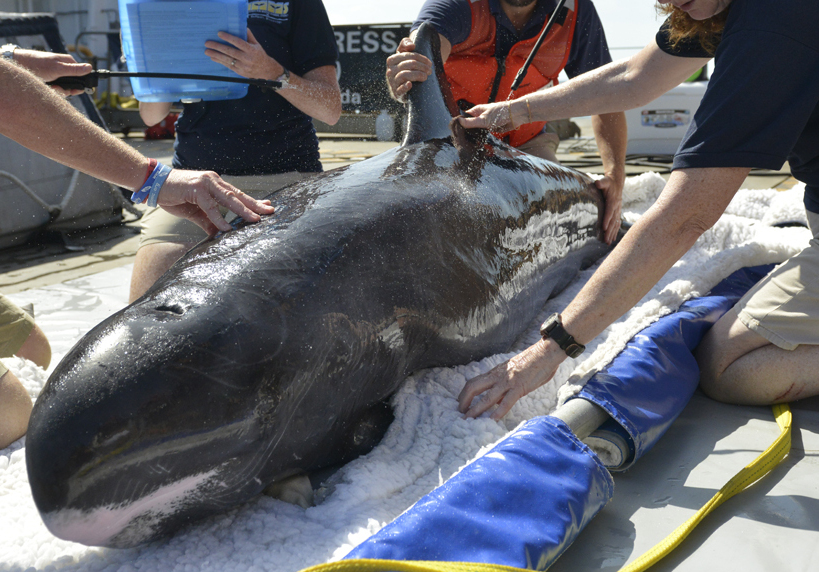

==== Genus: Globicephala ====
===== Species: Globicephala macrorhynchus (short-finned pilot whale / ചെറുചിറകൻ തിമിംഗലം) =====
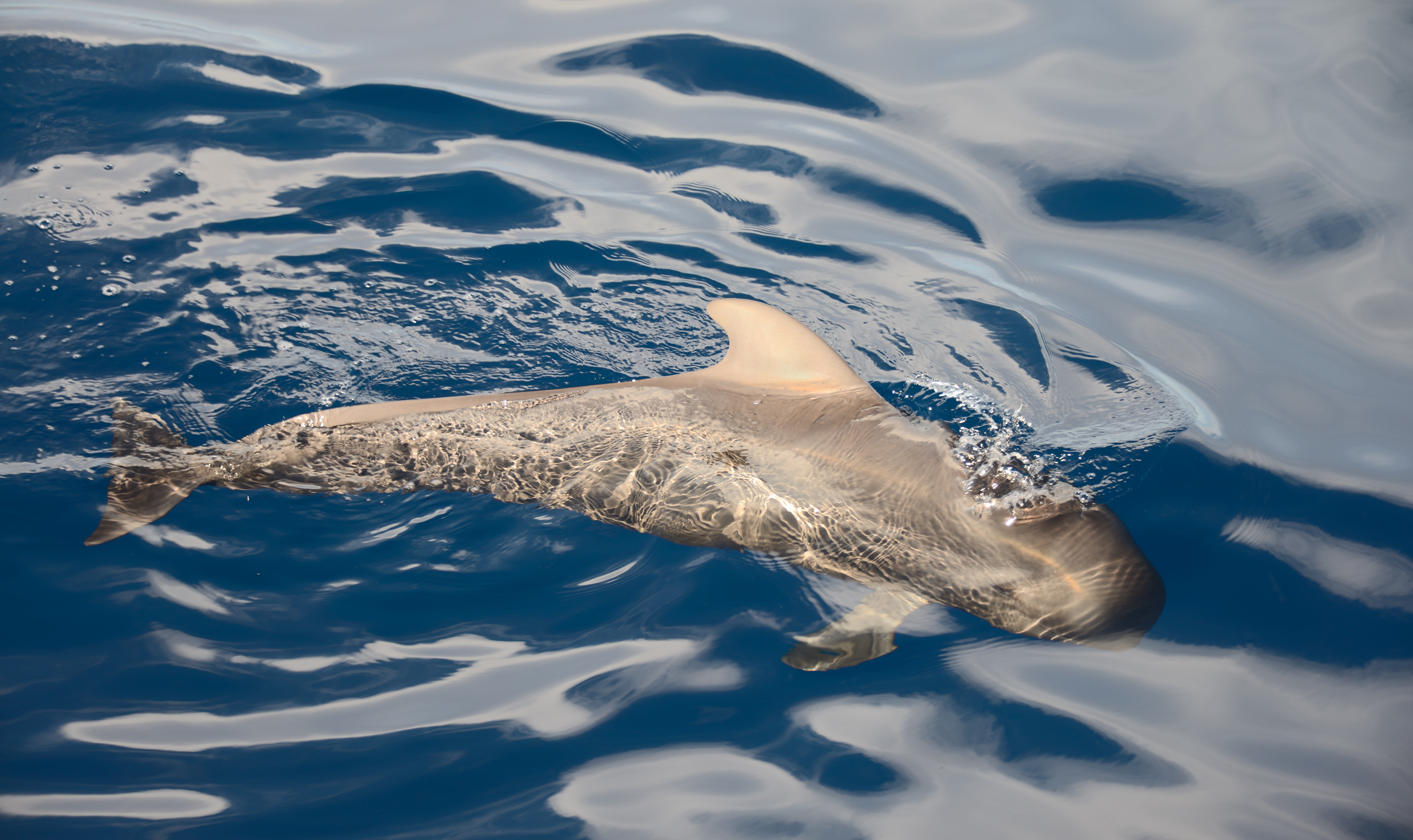

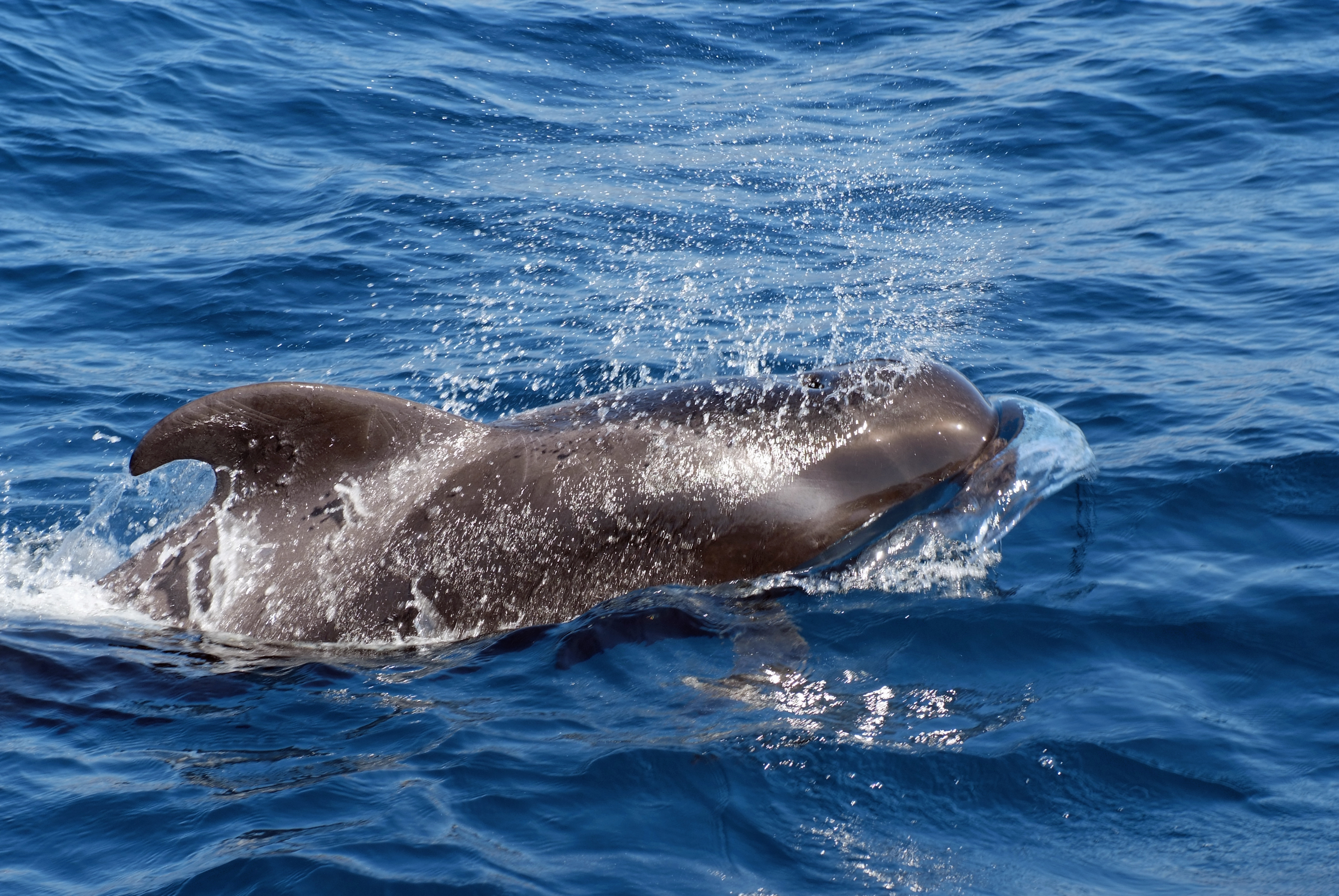

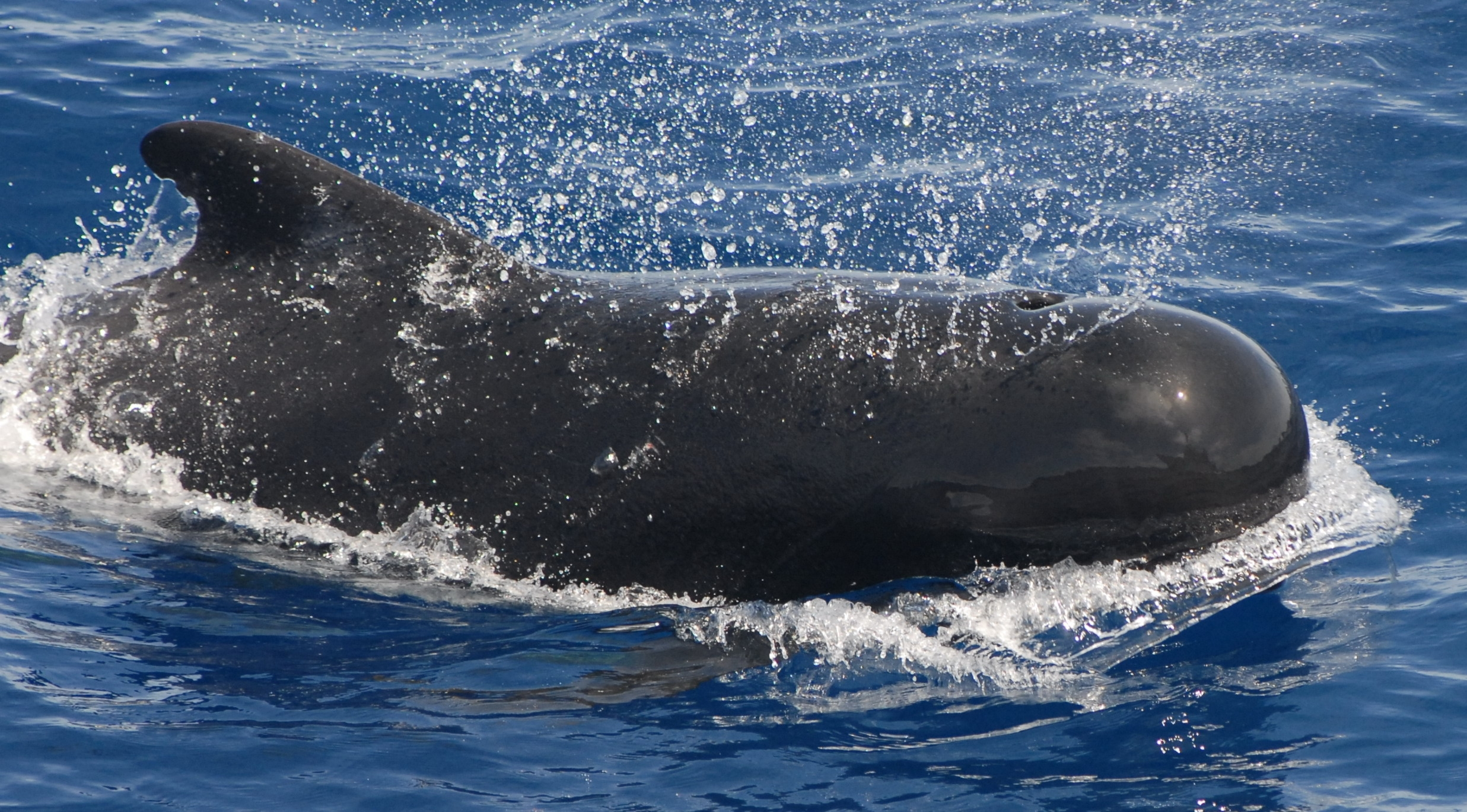

==== Genus: Grampus ====
===== Species: Grampus griseus (Risso's dolphin) =====
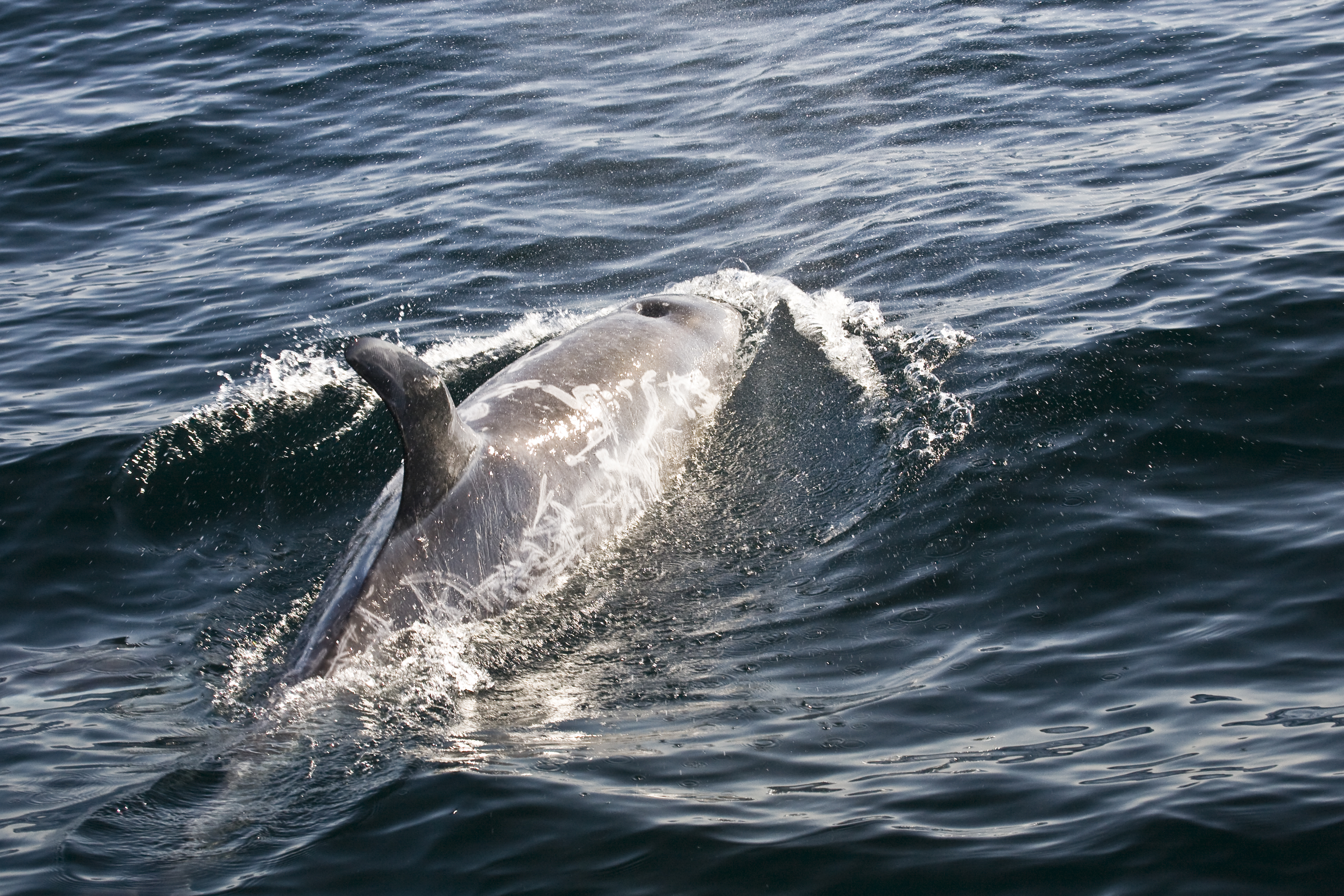

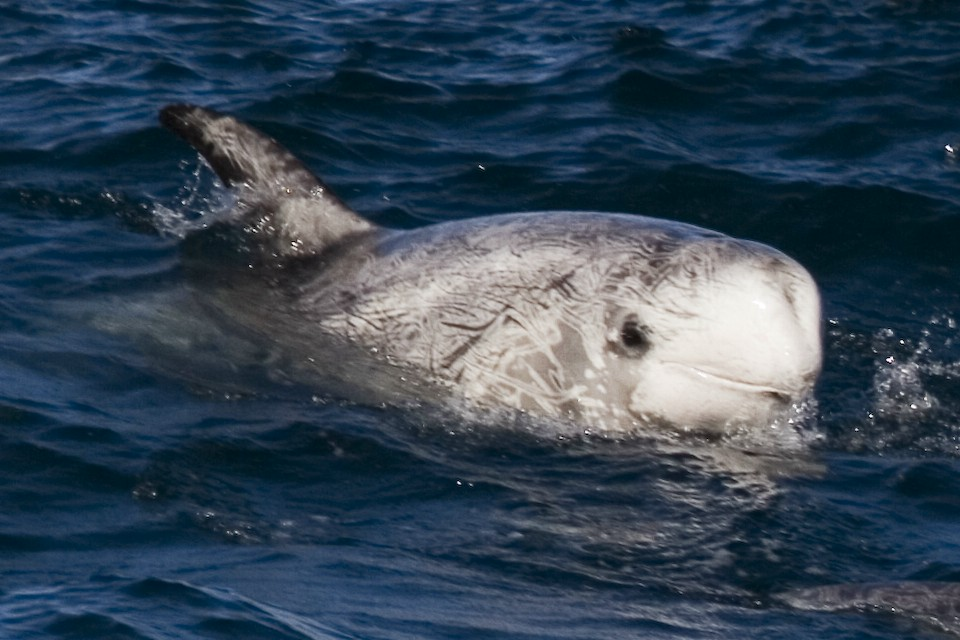

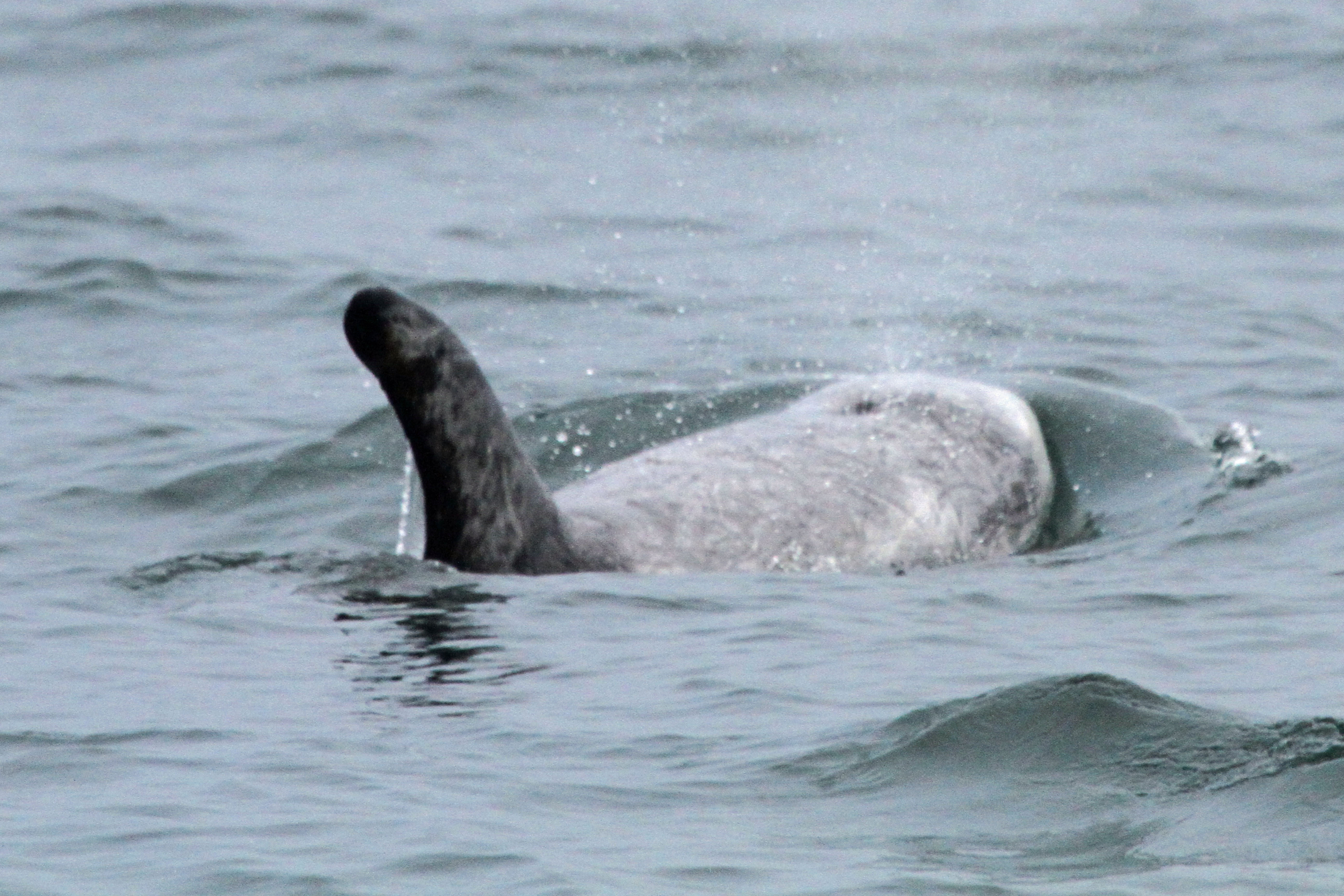

==== Genus: Lagenodelphis ====
===== Species: Lagenodelphis hosei (Fraser's dolphin / ആഴക്കടൽ ഡോൾഫിൻ) =====
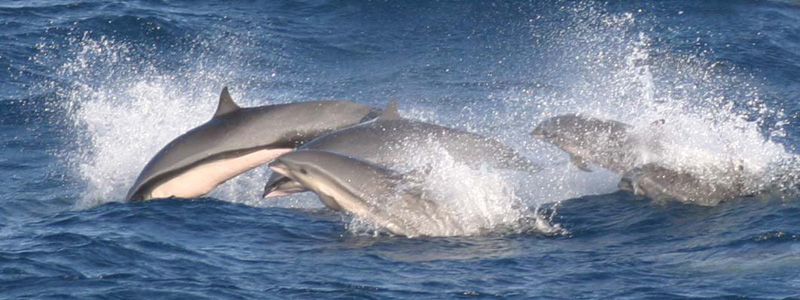

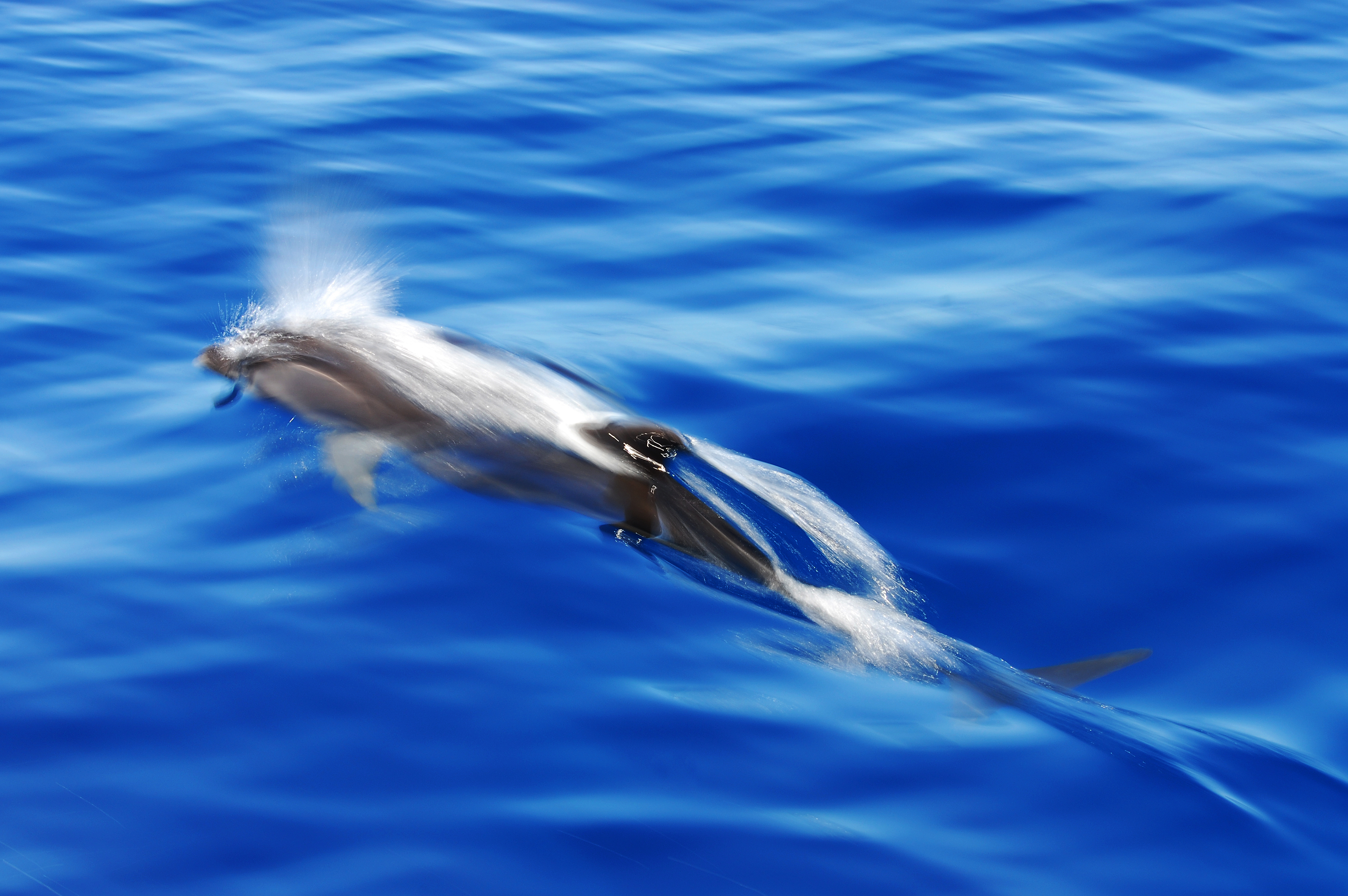

==== Genus: Orcinus ====
===== Species: Orcinus orca (killer whale / കൊലയാളിത്തിമിംഗലം) =====

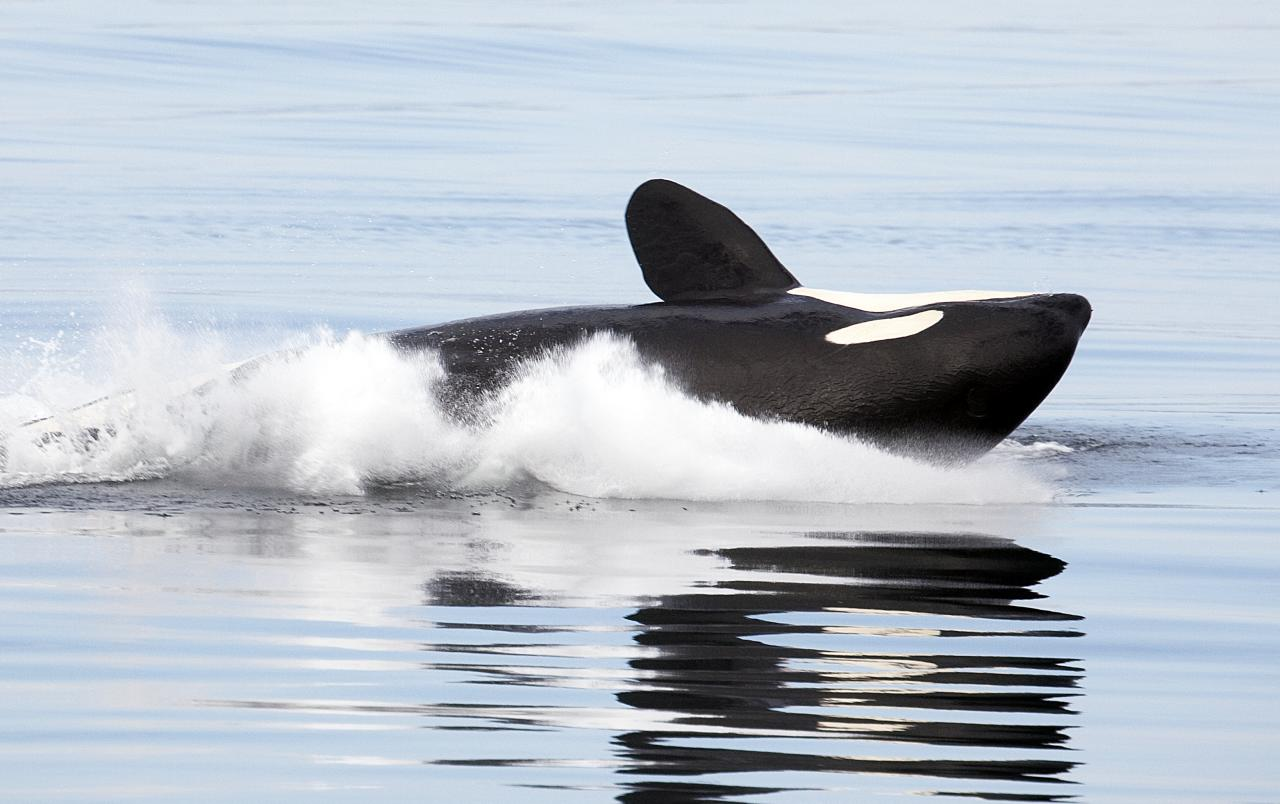

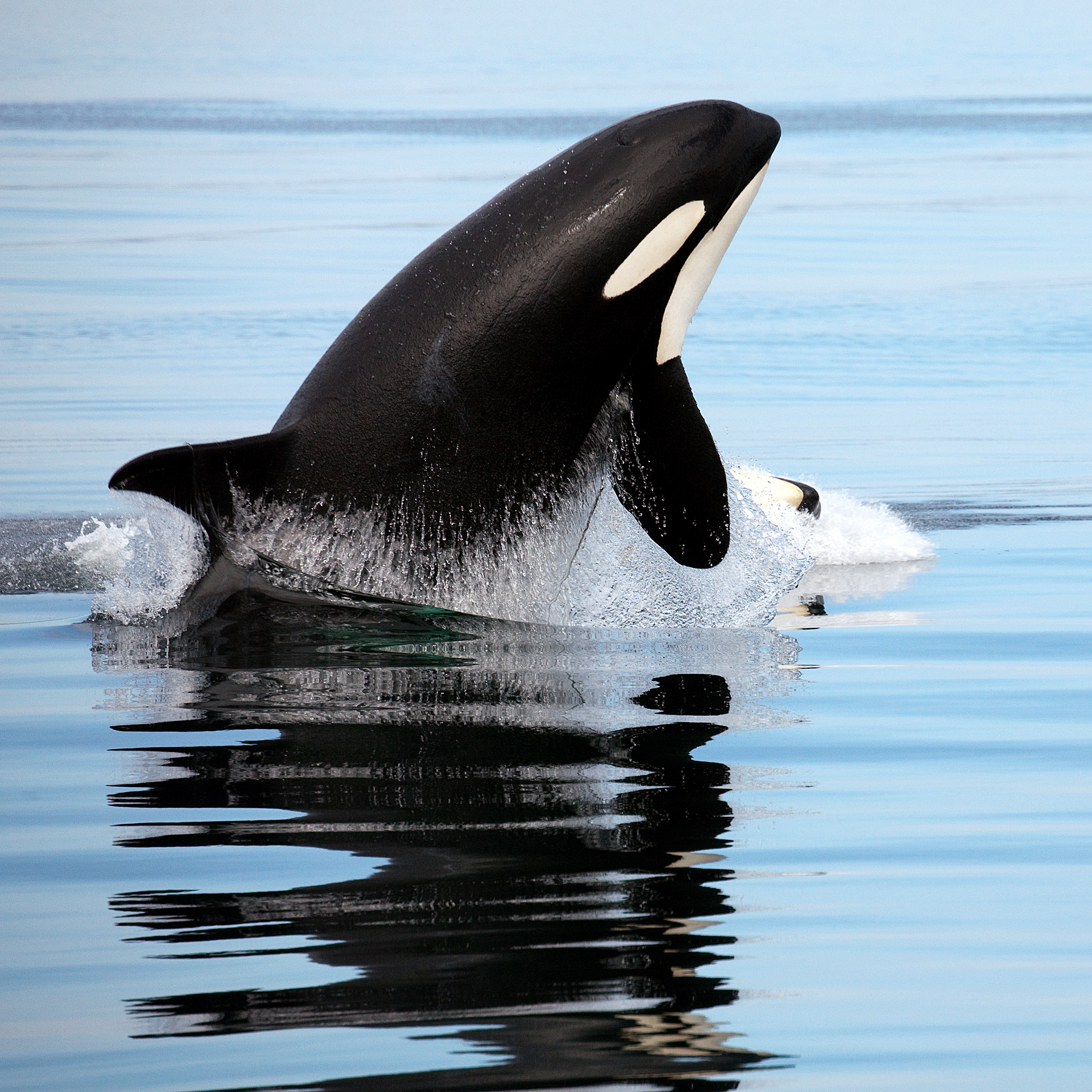

==== Genus: Peponocephala ====
===== Species: Peponocephala electra (melon-headed whale / മത്തങ്ങാത്തലയൻ തിമിംഗലം) =====
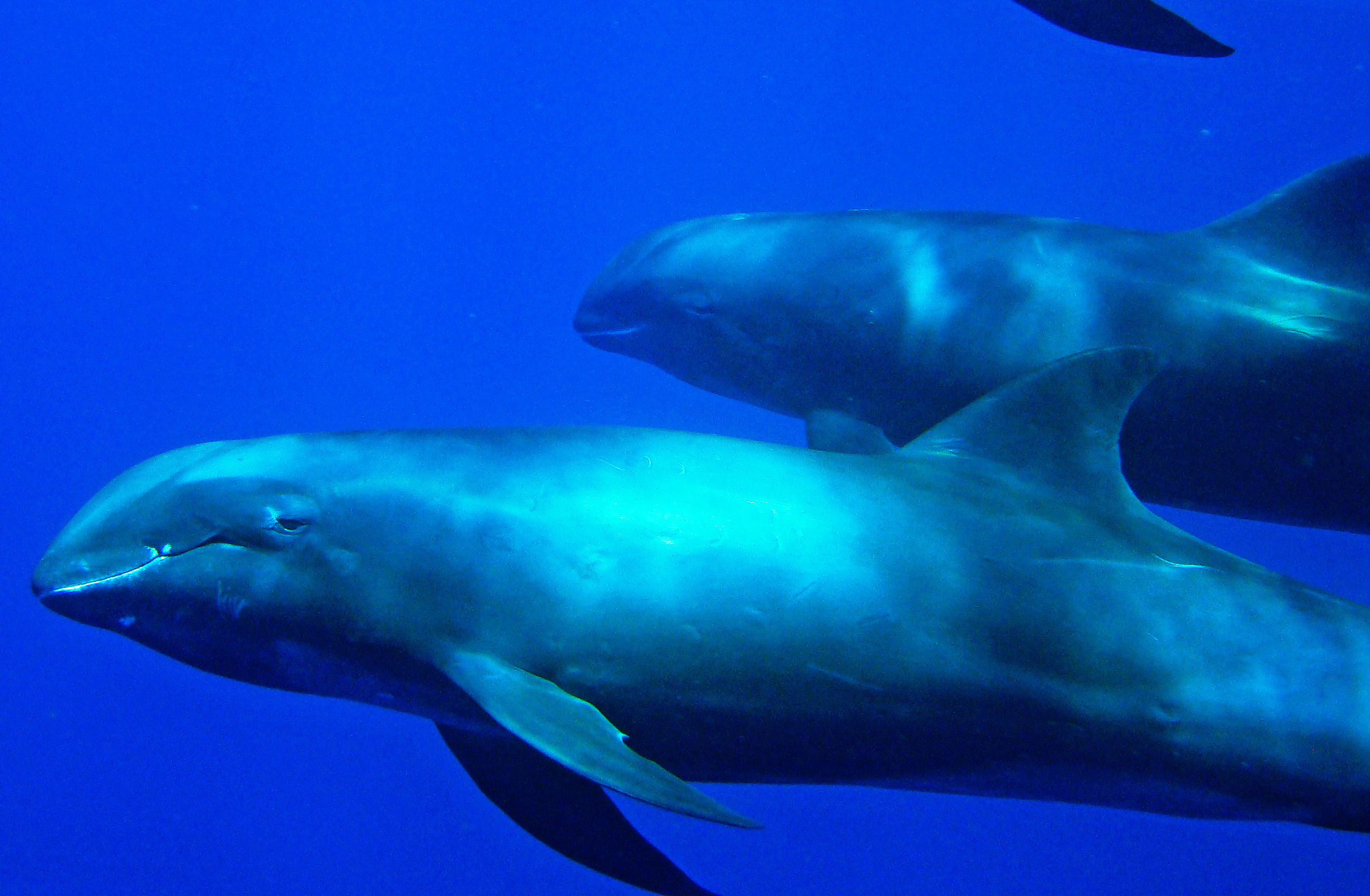

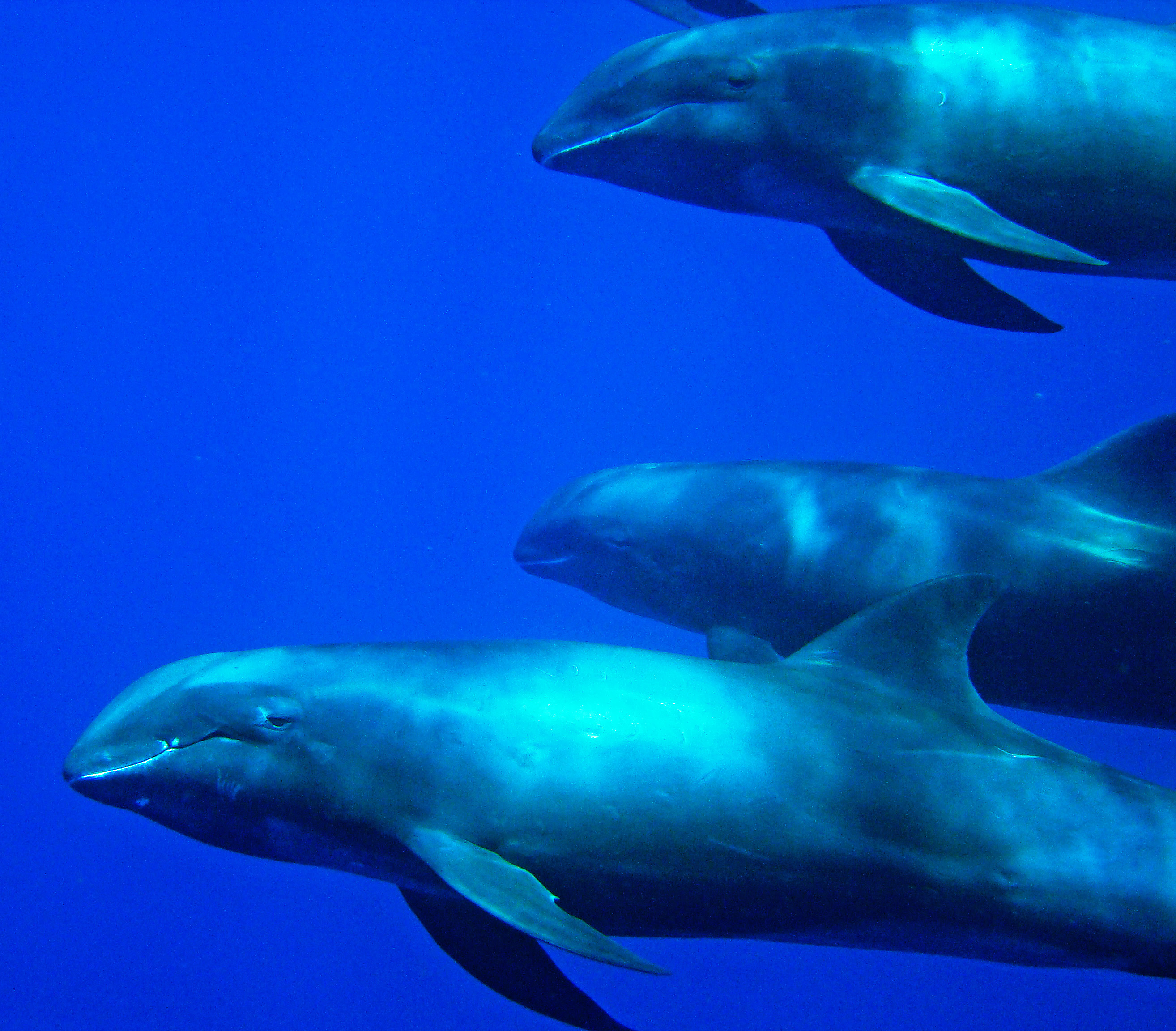

==== Genus: Pseudorca ====
===== Species: Pseudorca crassidens (false killer whale / കപട കൊലയാളിത്തിമിംഗലം) =====
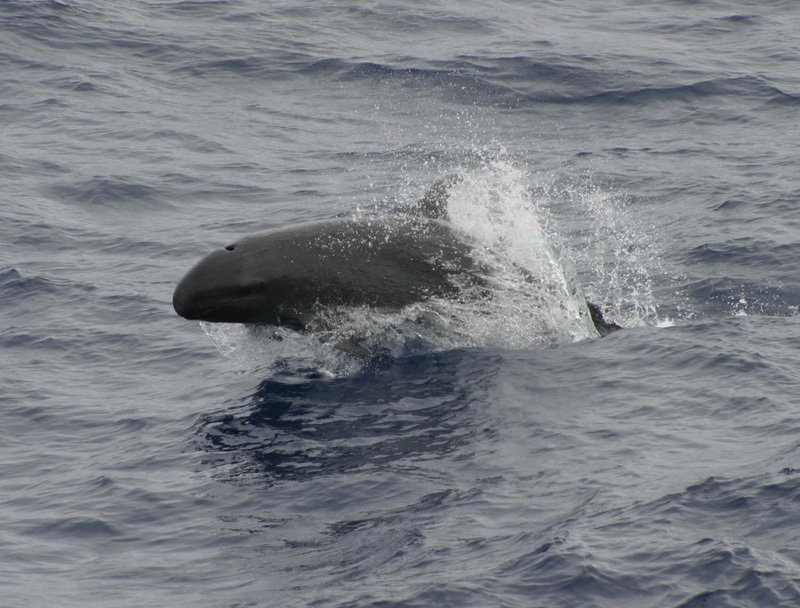

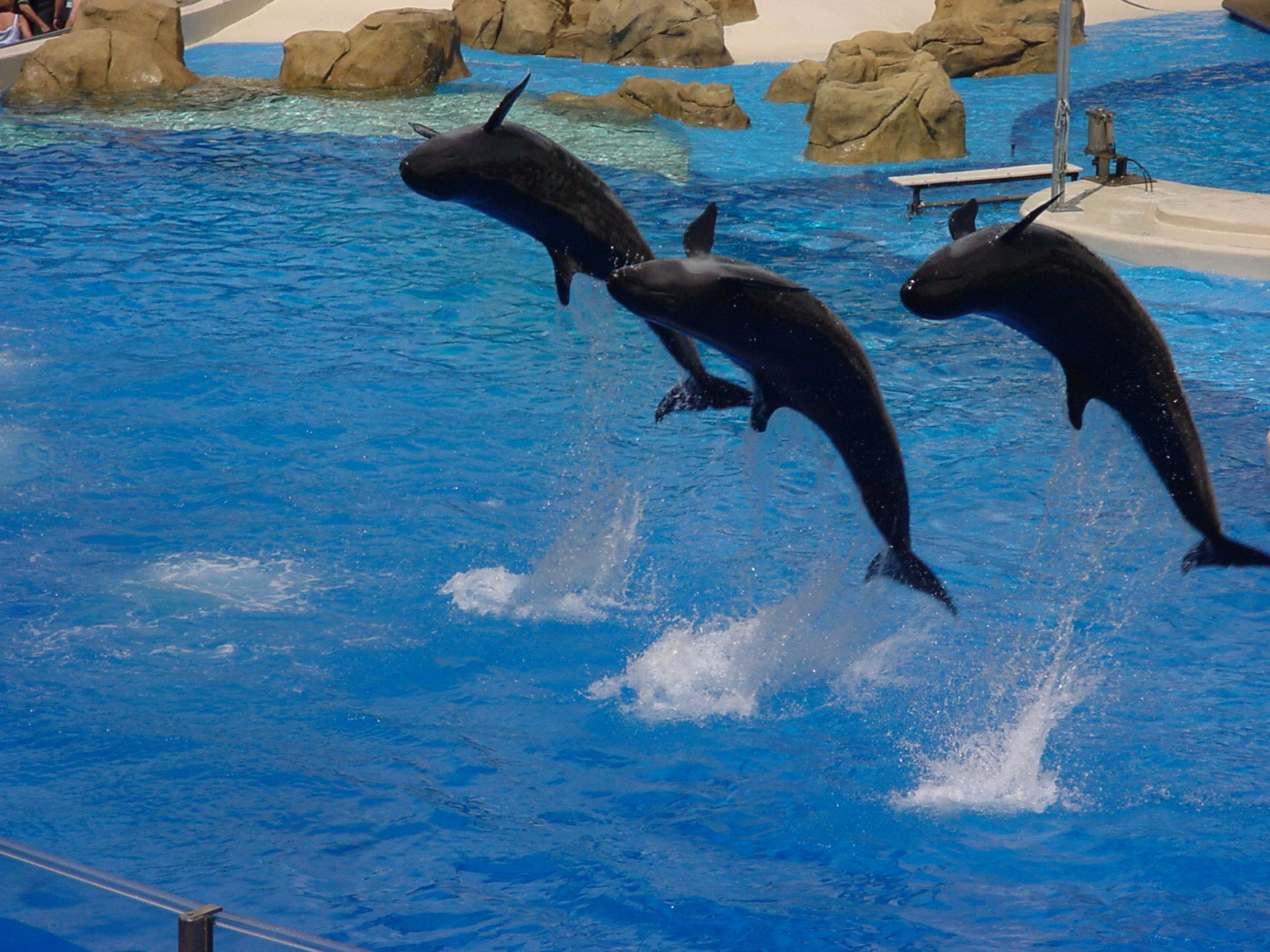

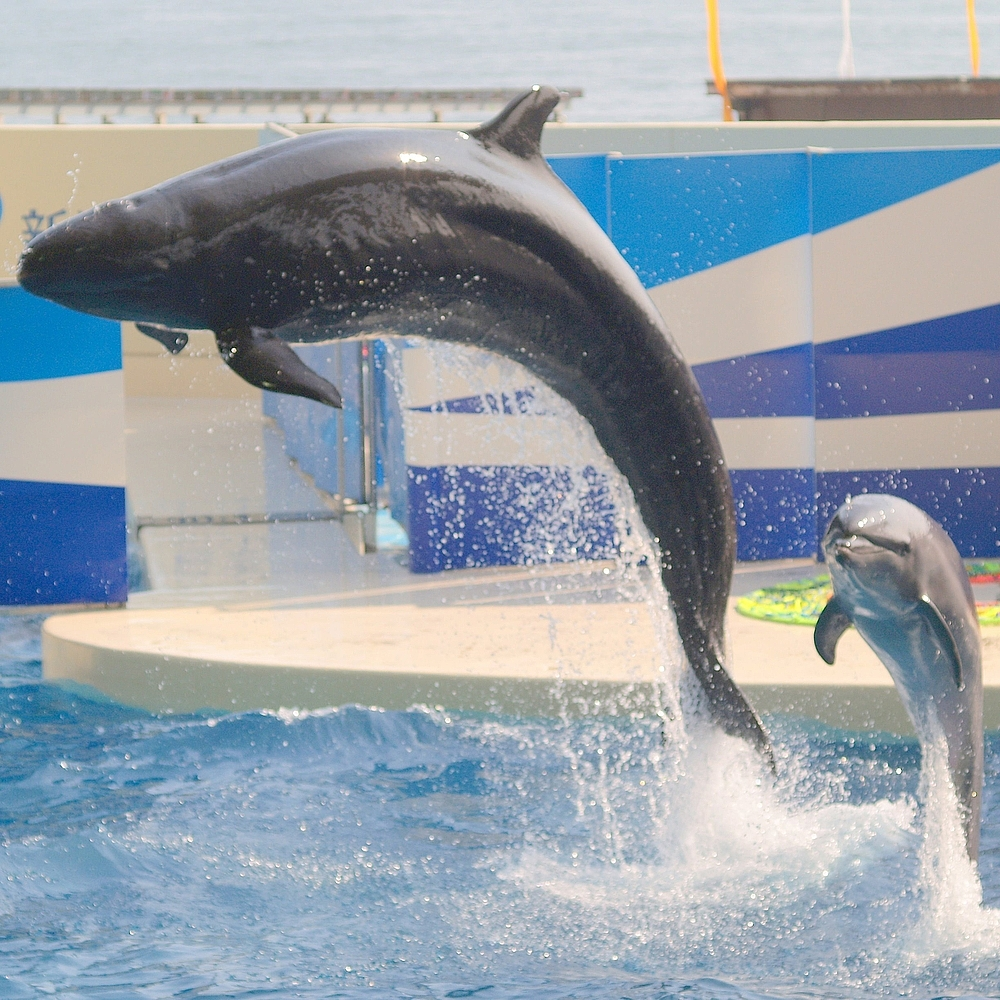

==== Genus: Sousa ====
===== Species: Sousa chinensis (Indo-Pacific humpbacked dolphin) =====
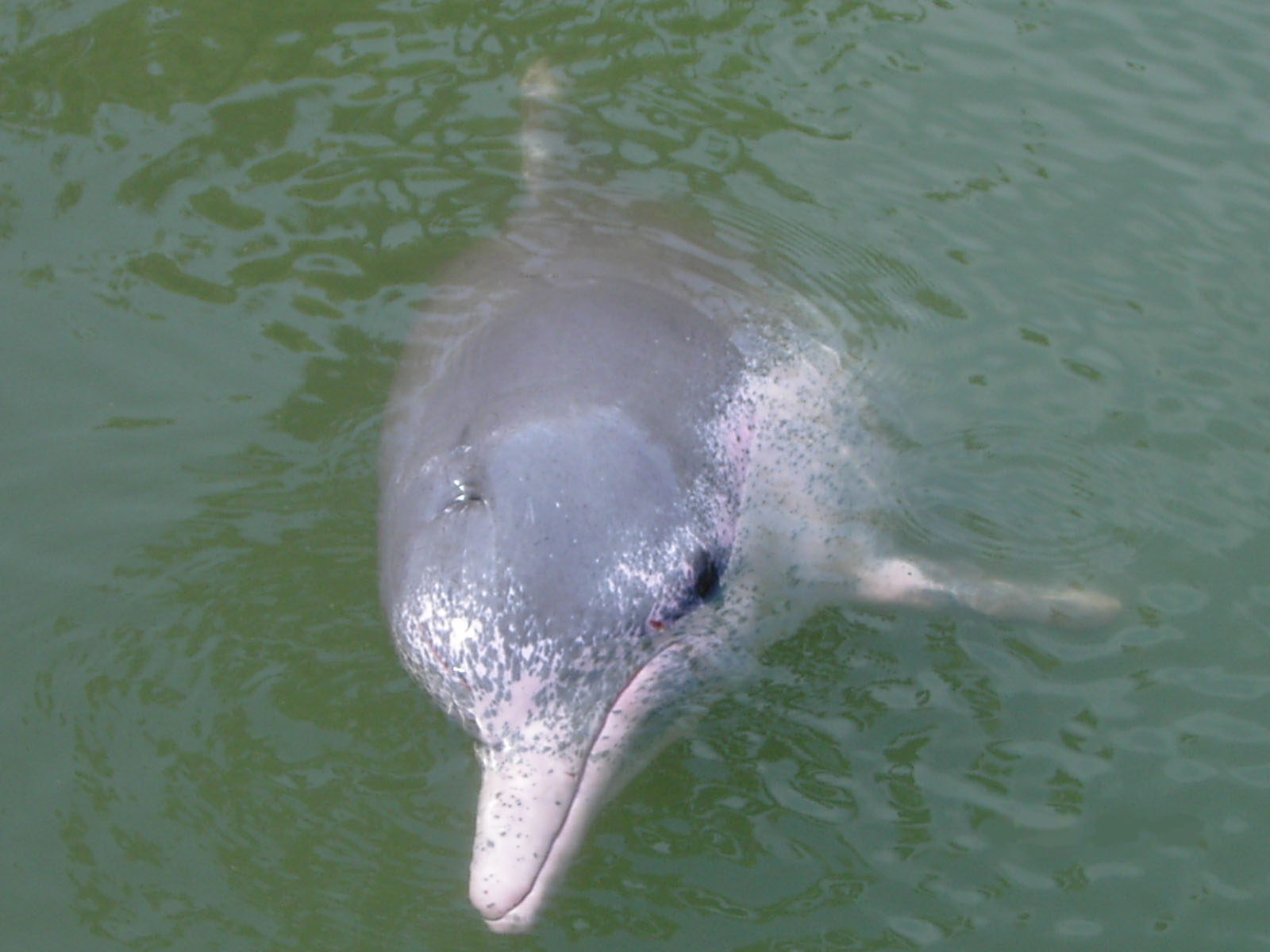

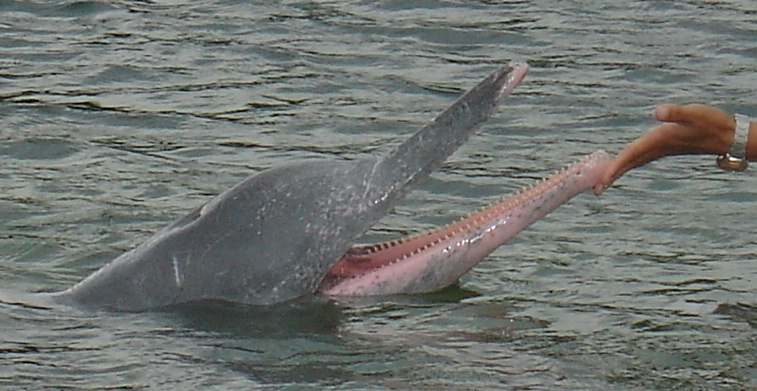

==== Genus: Stenella ====
===== Species: Stenella attenuata (pantropical spotted dolphin / പുള്ളി ഡോൾഫിൻ) =====
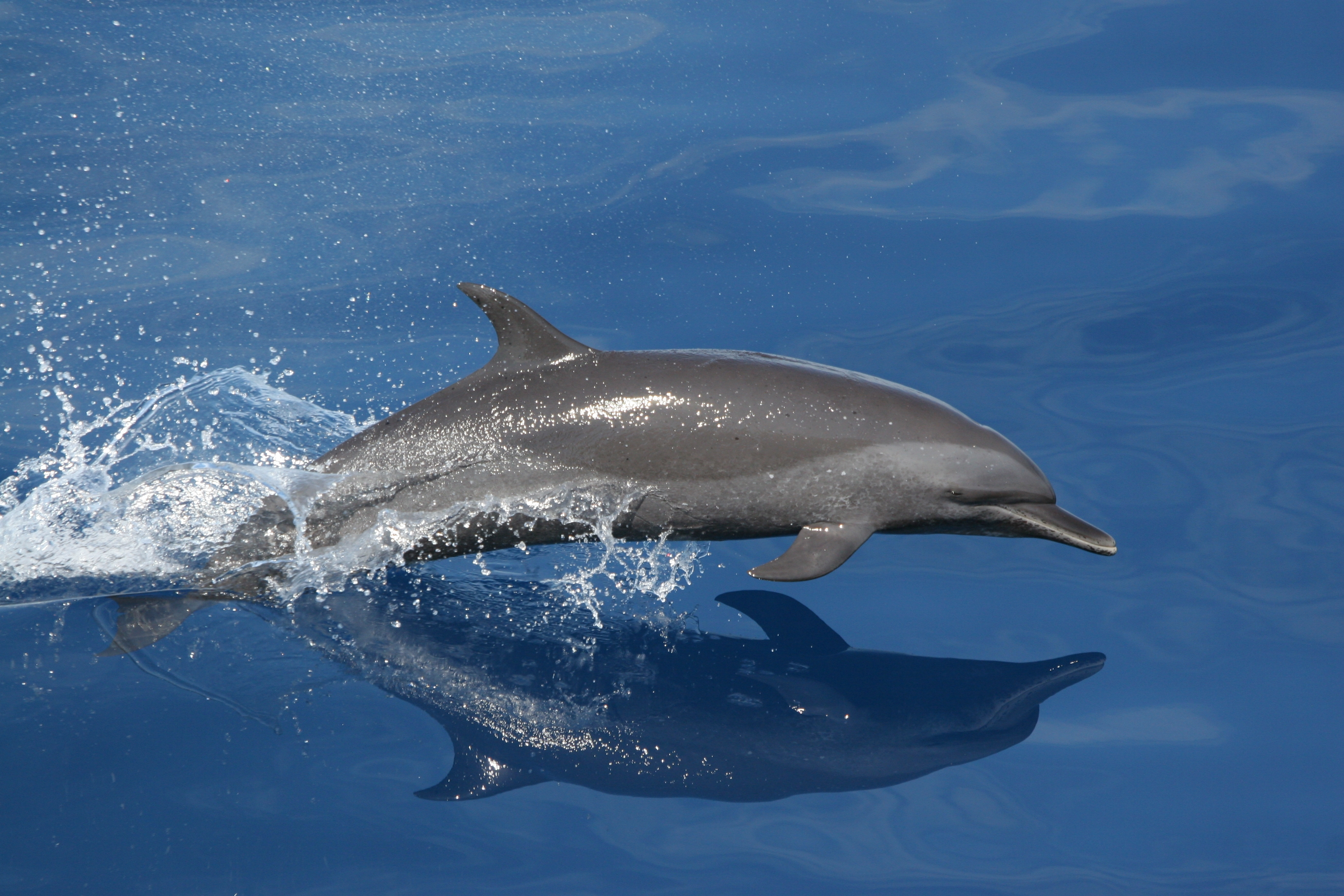

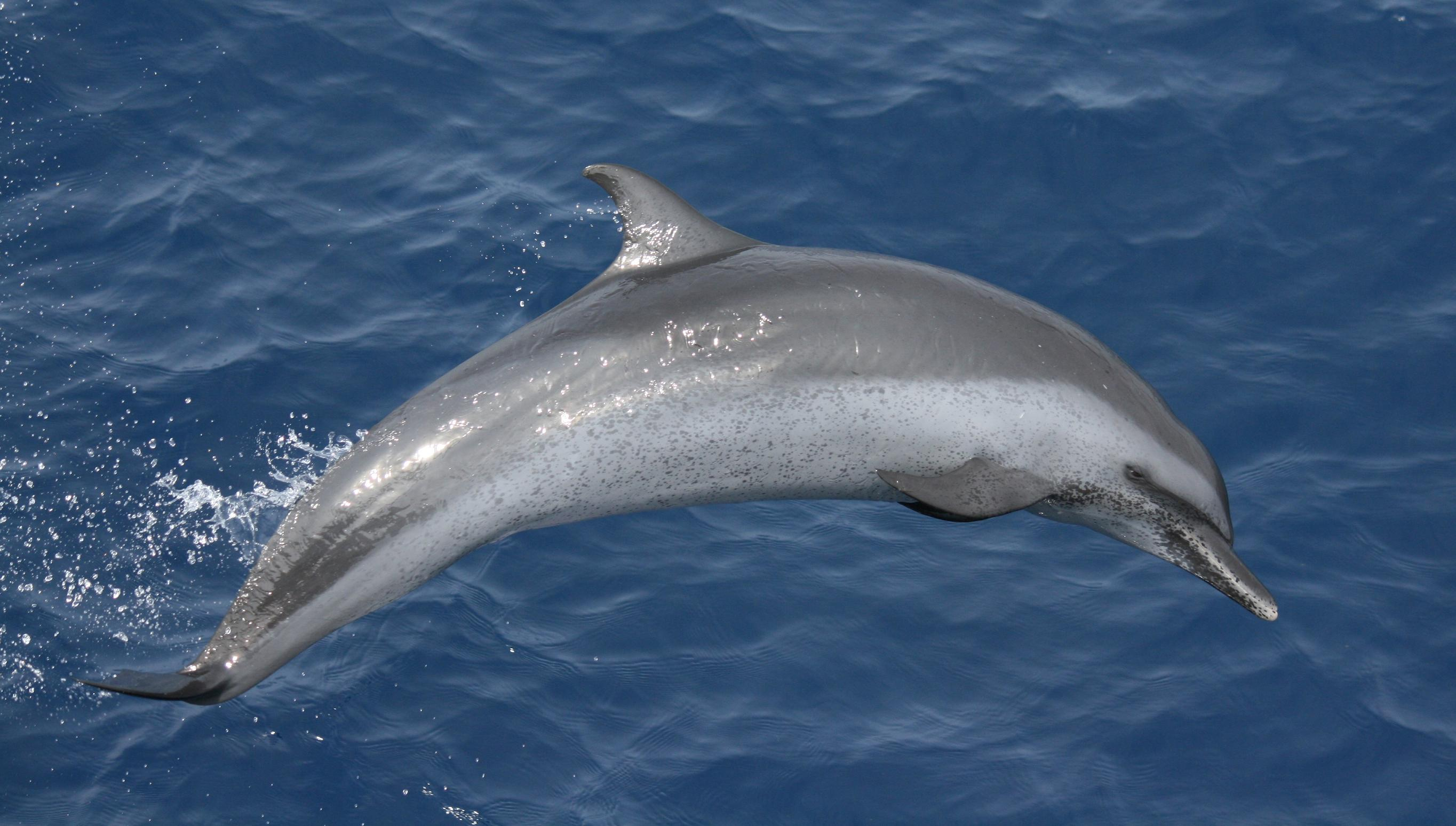

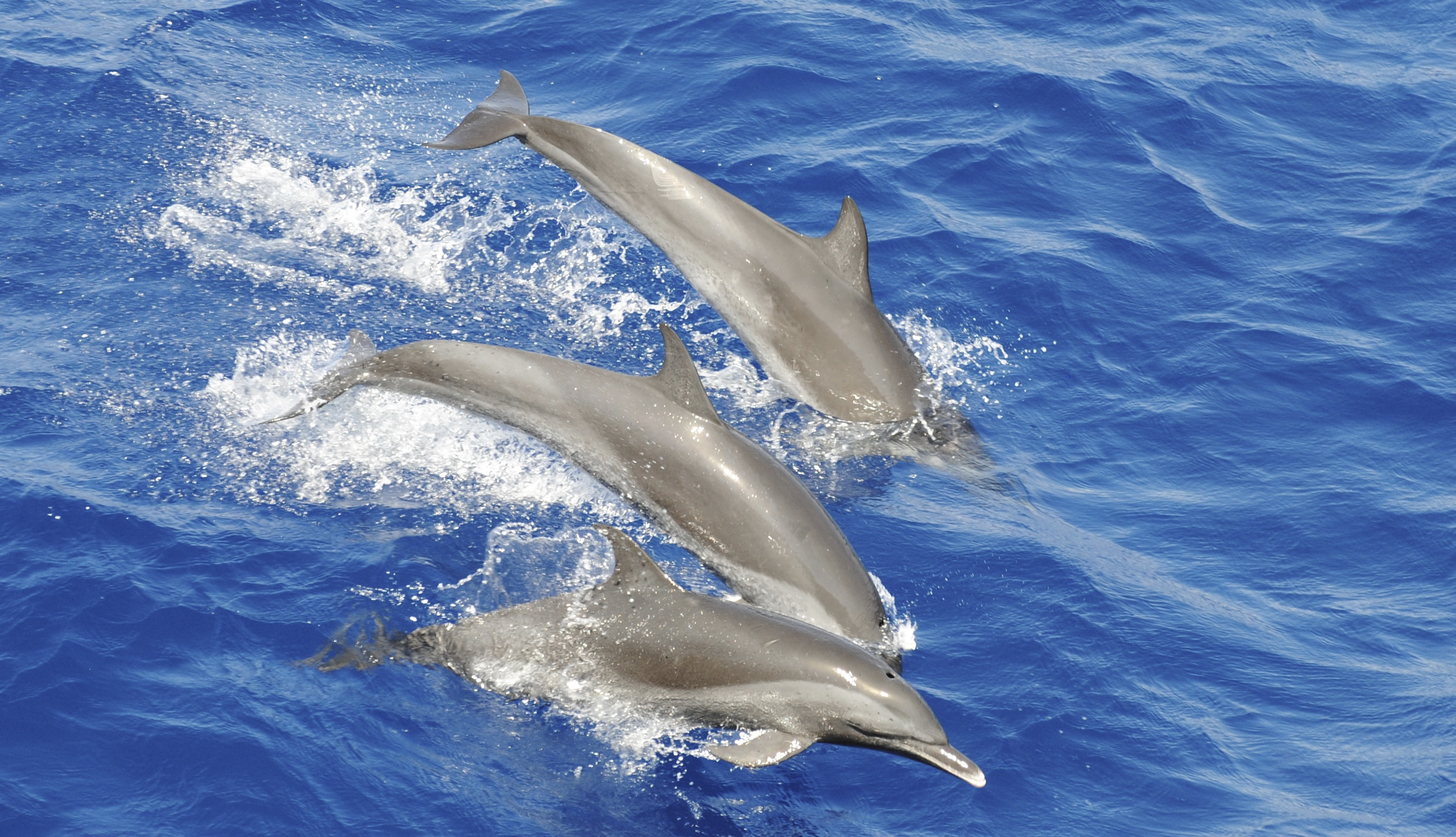

===== Species: Stenella coeruleoalba (striped dolphin / വരയൻ ഡോൾഫിൻ) =====
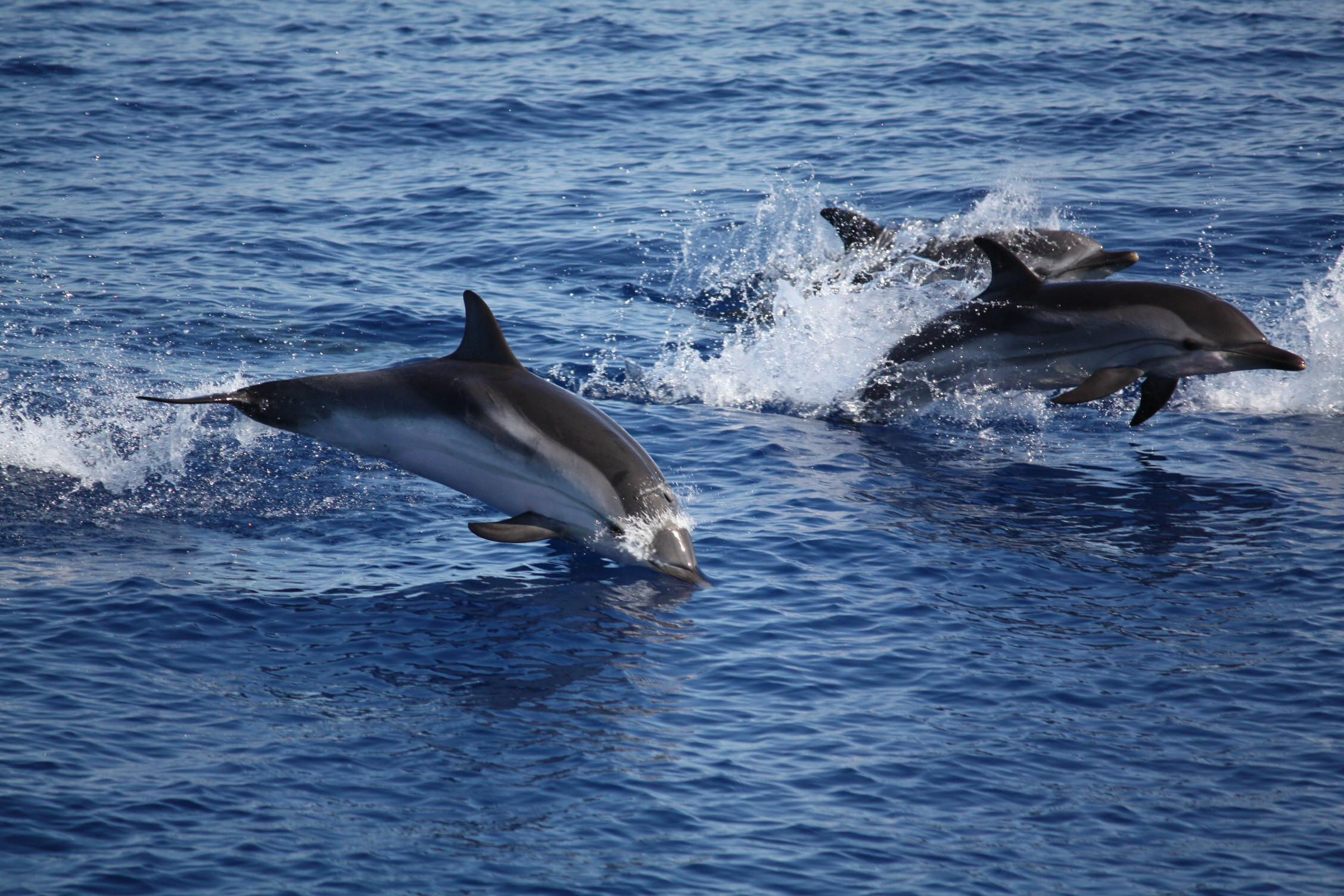

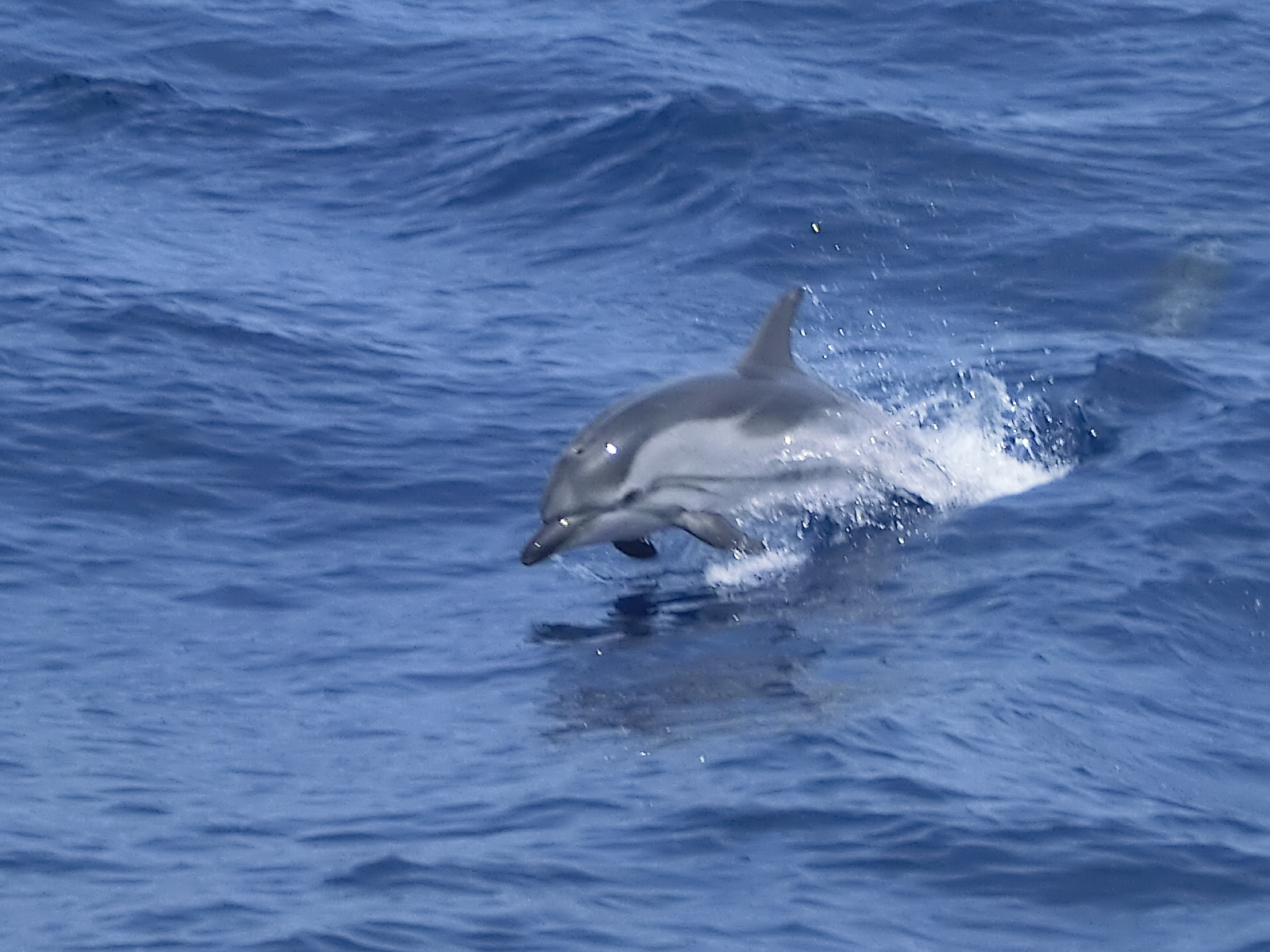

===== Species: Stenella longirostris (spinner dolphin) =====
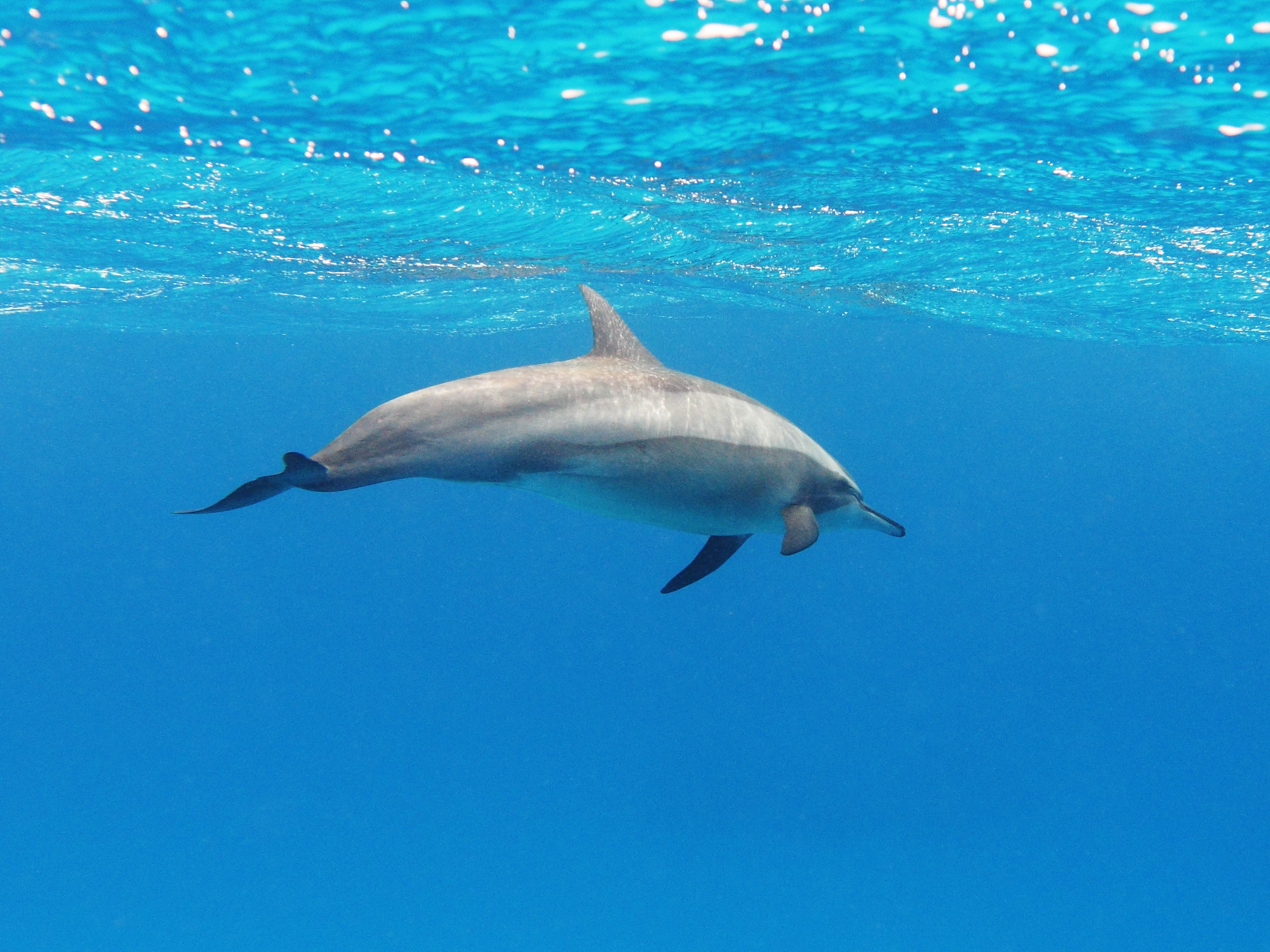

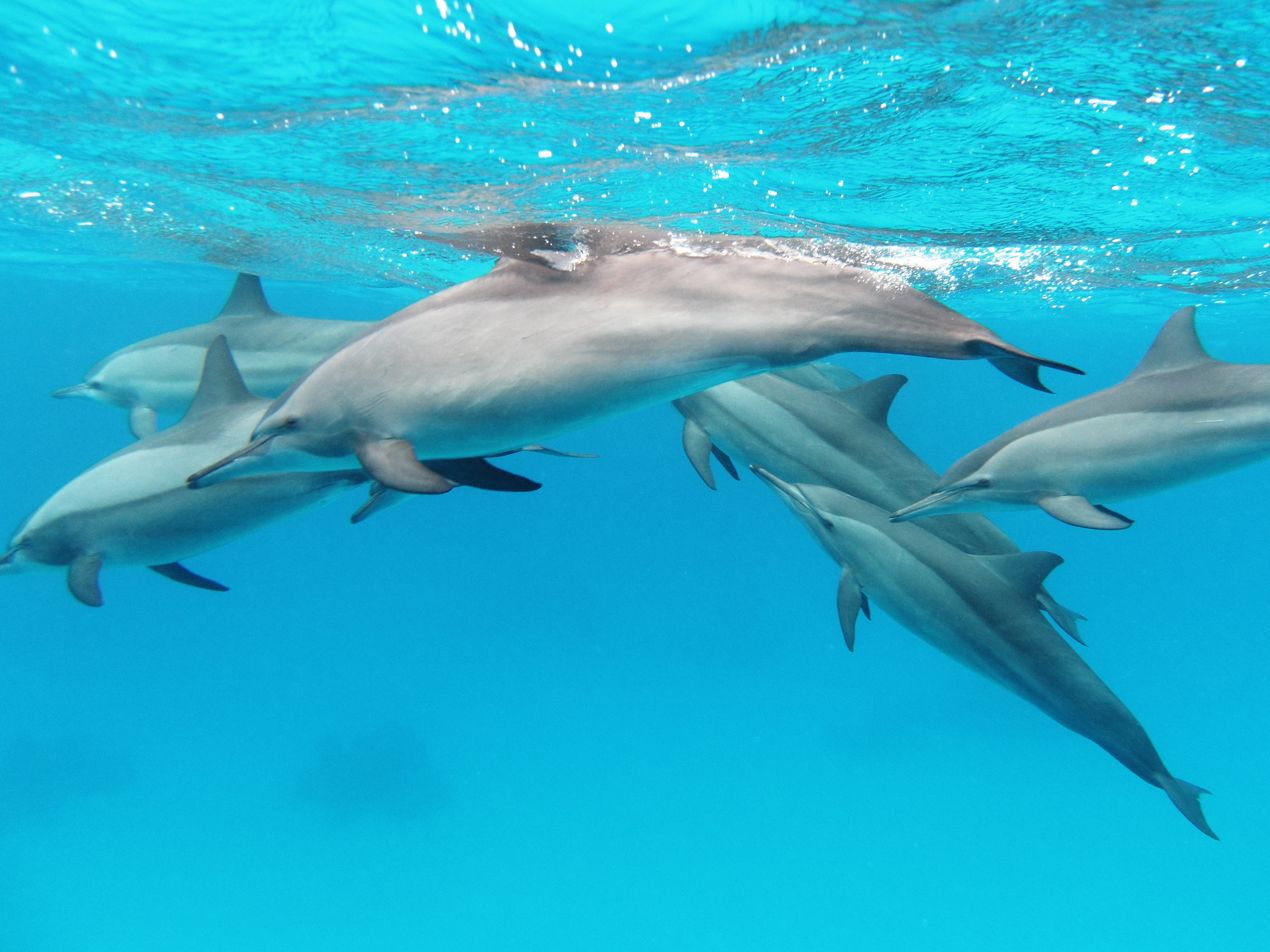

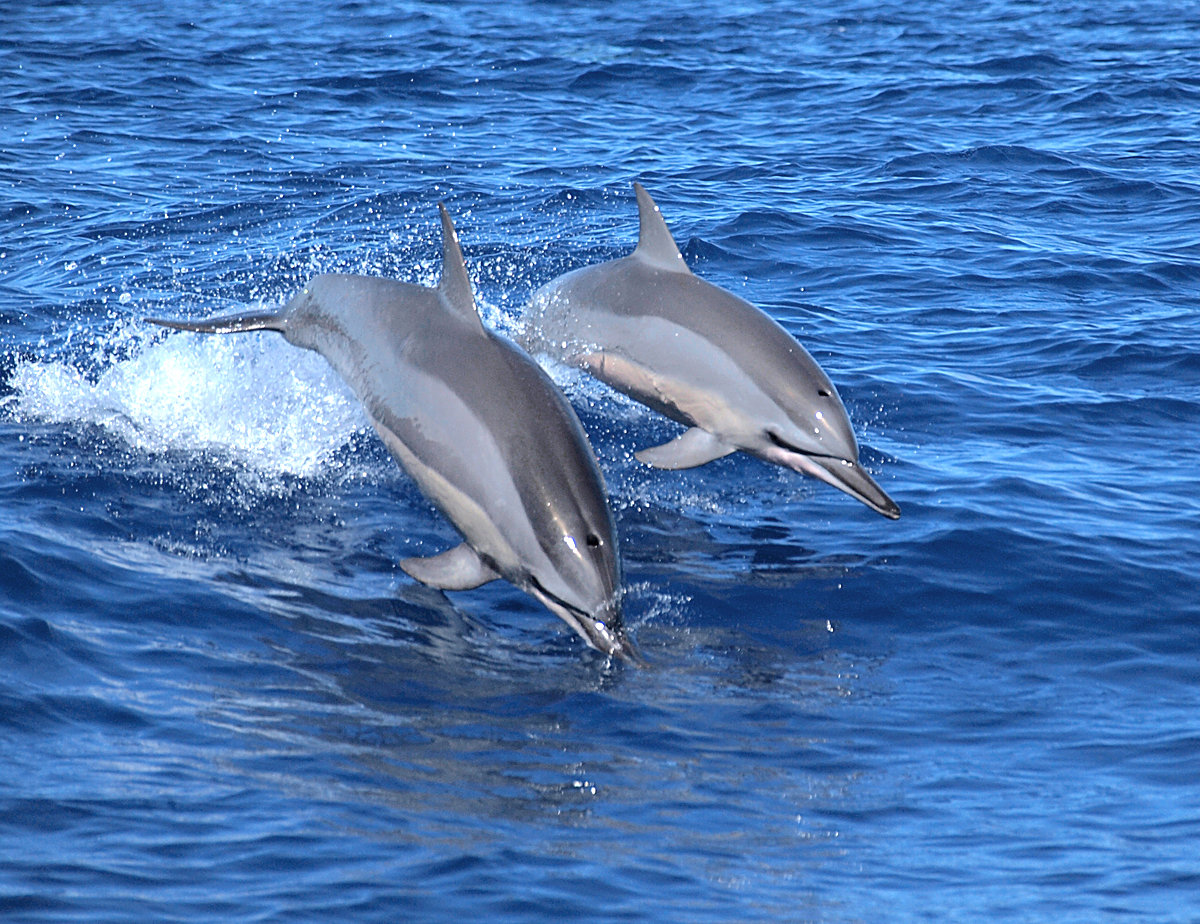

==== Genus: Steno ====
===== Species: Steno bredanensis (rough-toothed dolphin / പരുക്കൻപല്ലൻ ഡോൾഫിൻ) =====
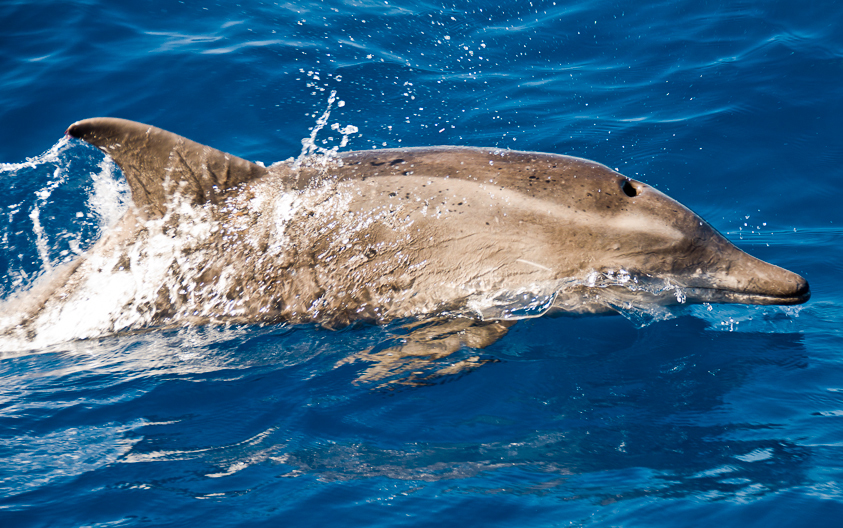

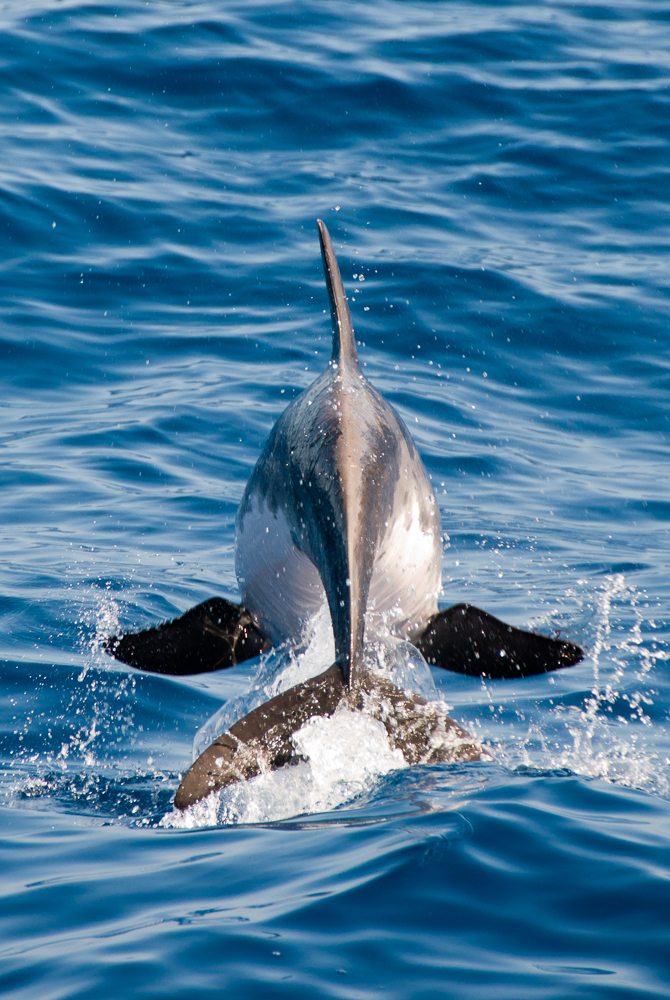

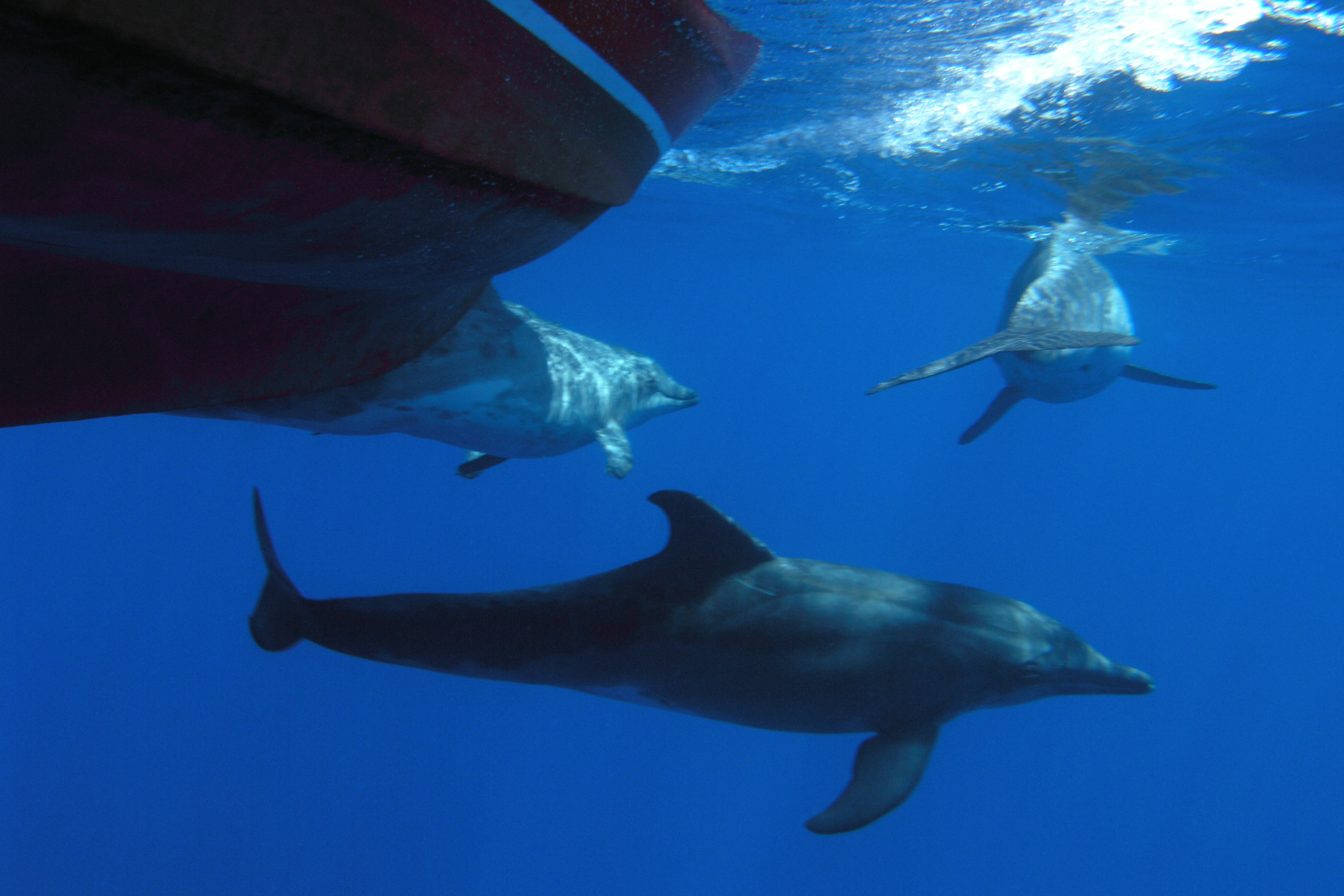

==== Genus: Tursiops ====
===== Species: Tursiops aduncus (Indo-Pacific bottlenose dolphin) =====
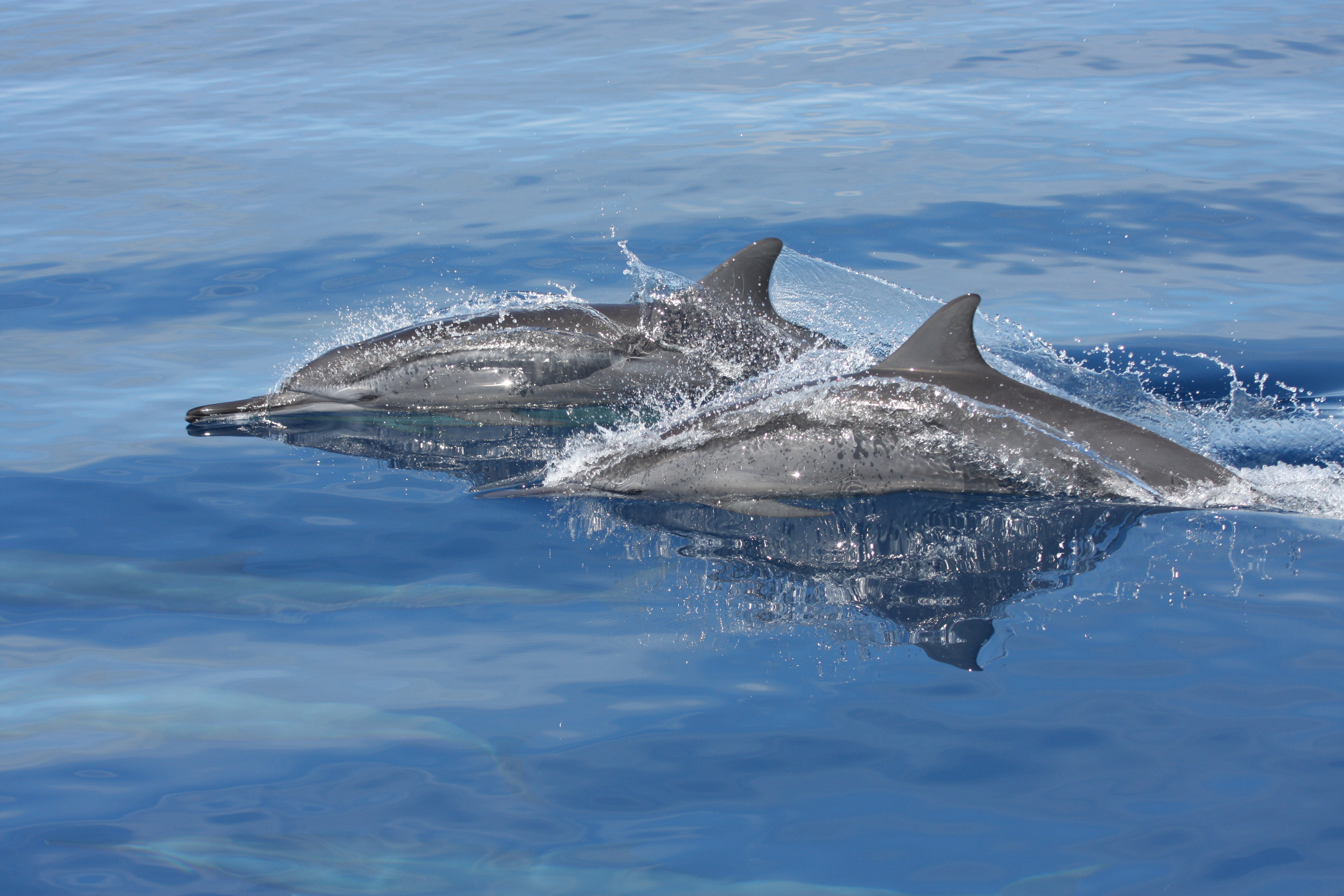

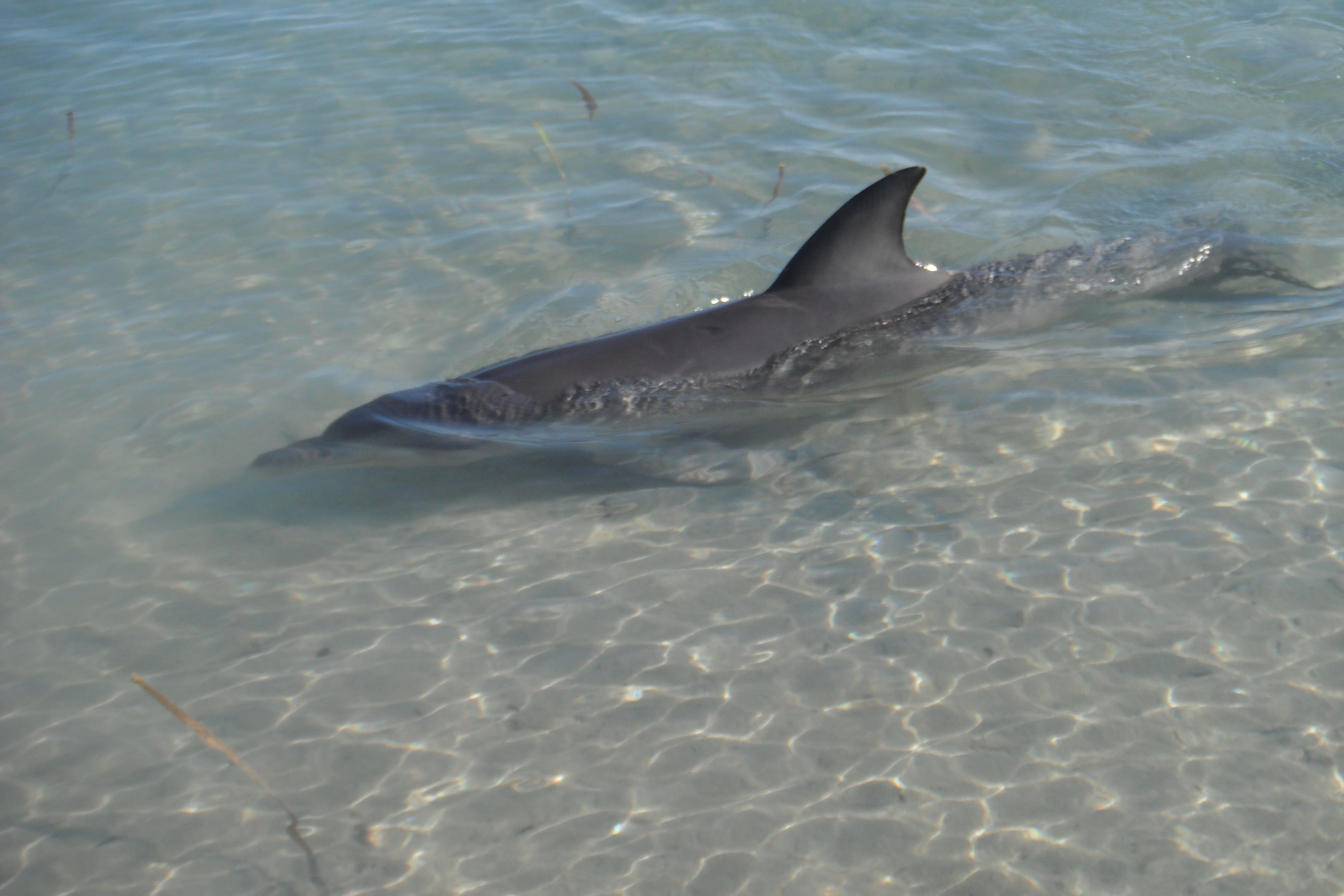

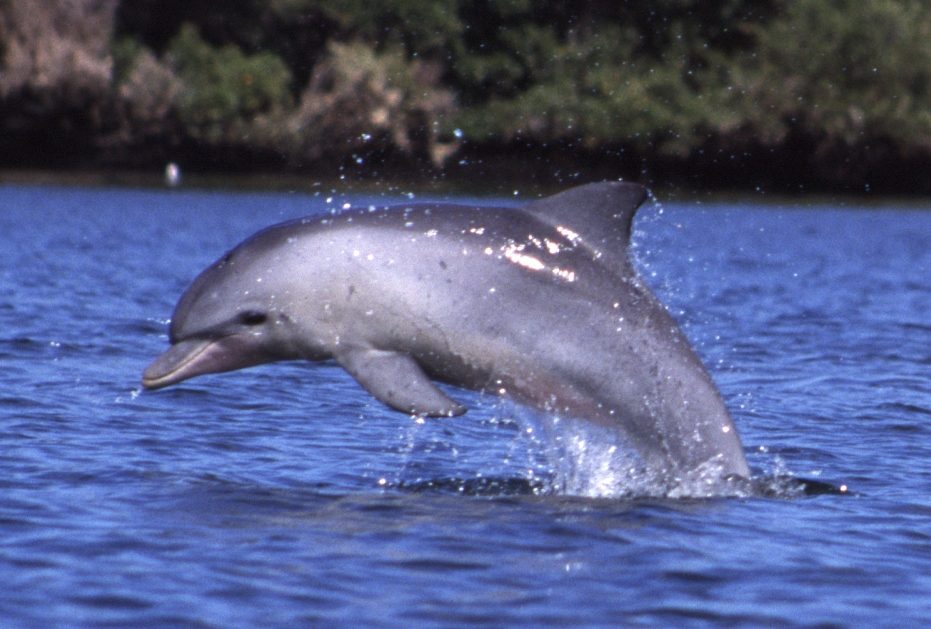

===== Species: Tursiops truncatus (common bottlenose dolphin / കുപ്പിമൂക്കൻ ഡോൾഫിൻ) =====
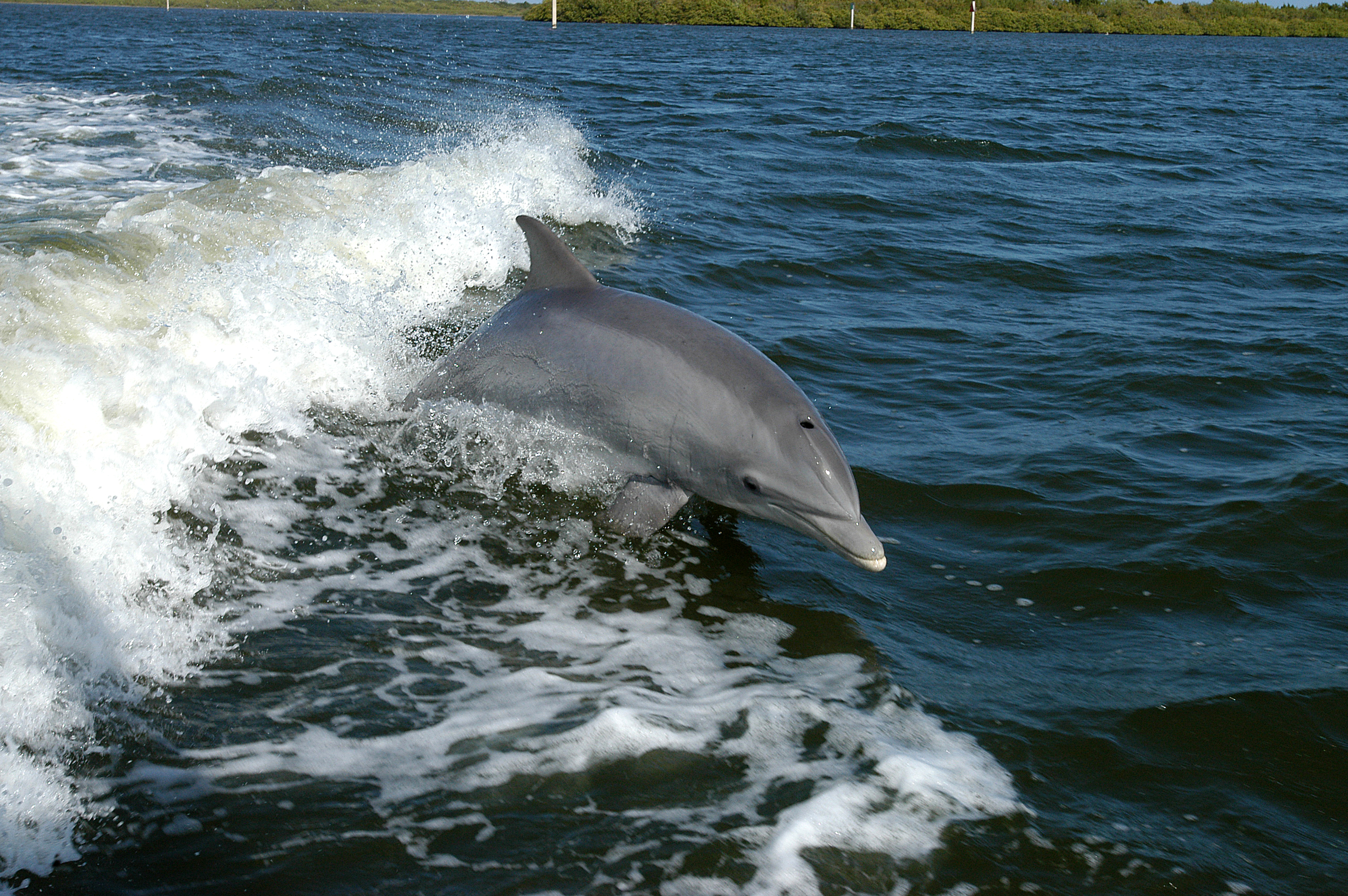

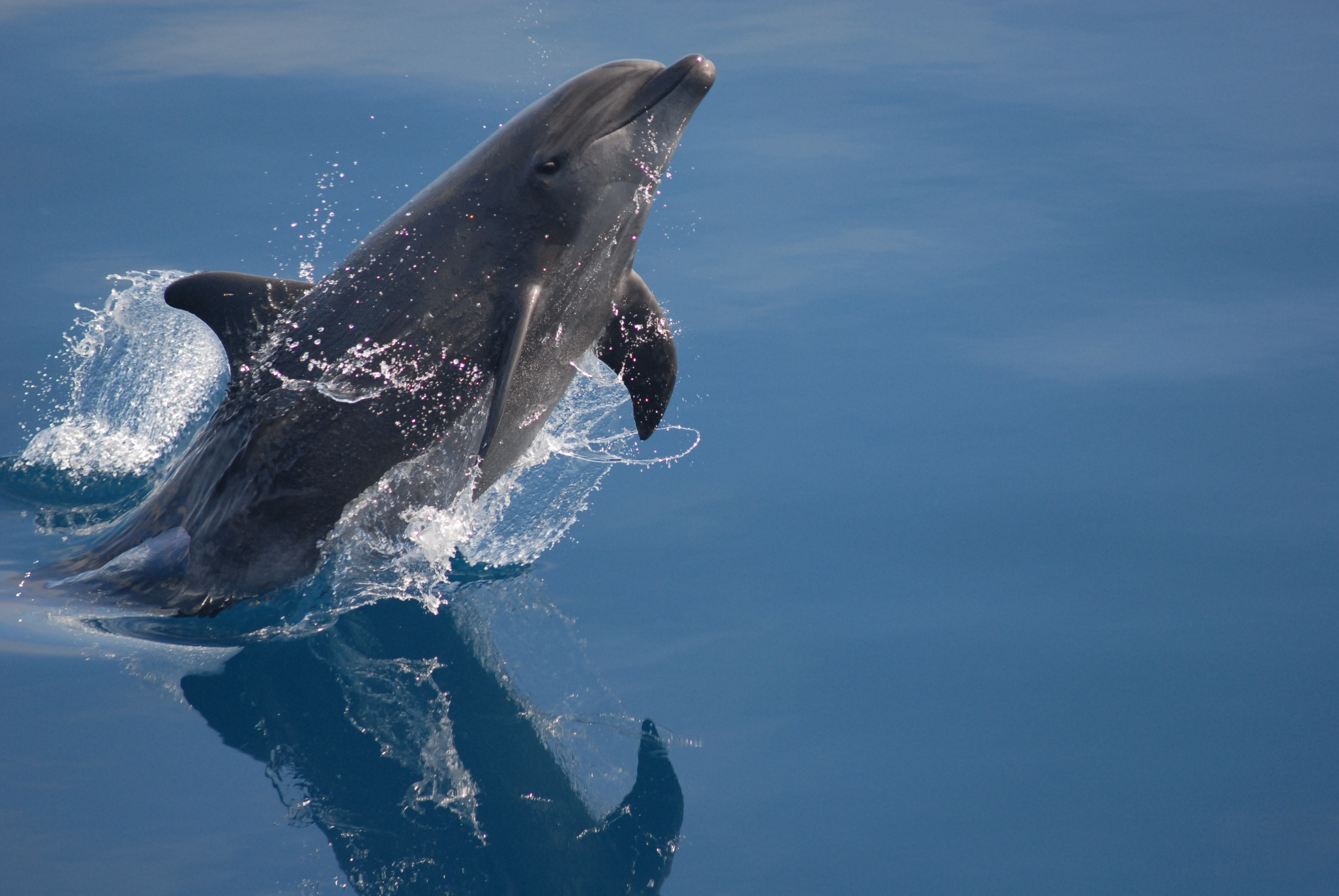

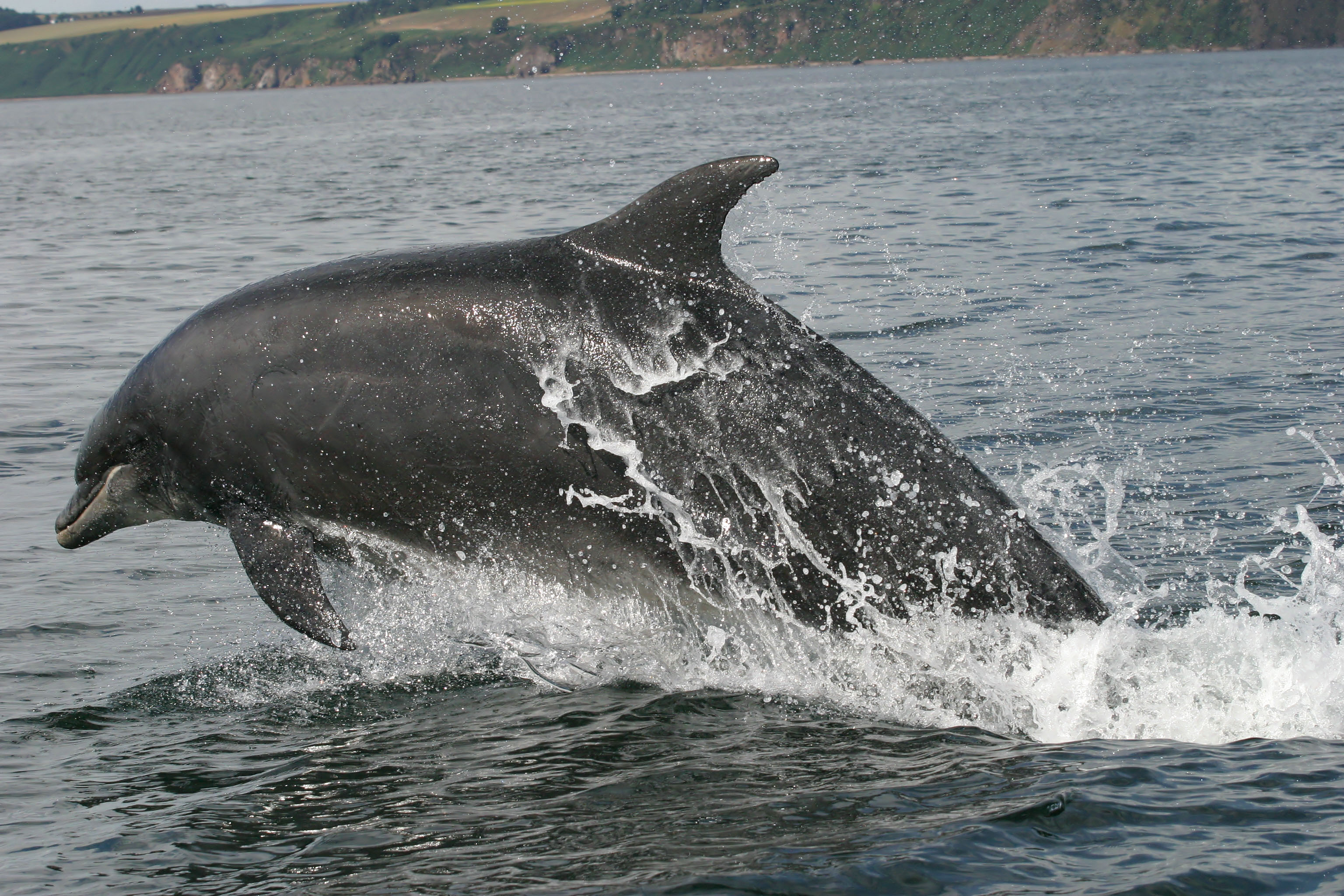

=== Family: Kogiidae ===
==== Genus: Kogia ====
===== Species: Kogia breviceps (pygmy sperm whale / കുഞ്ഞൻ എണ്ണത്തിമിംഗിലം) =====
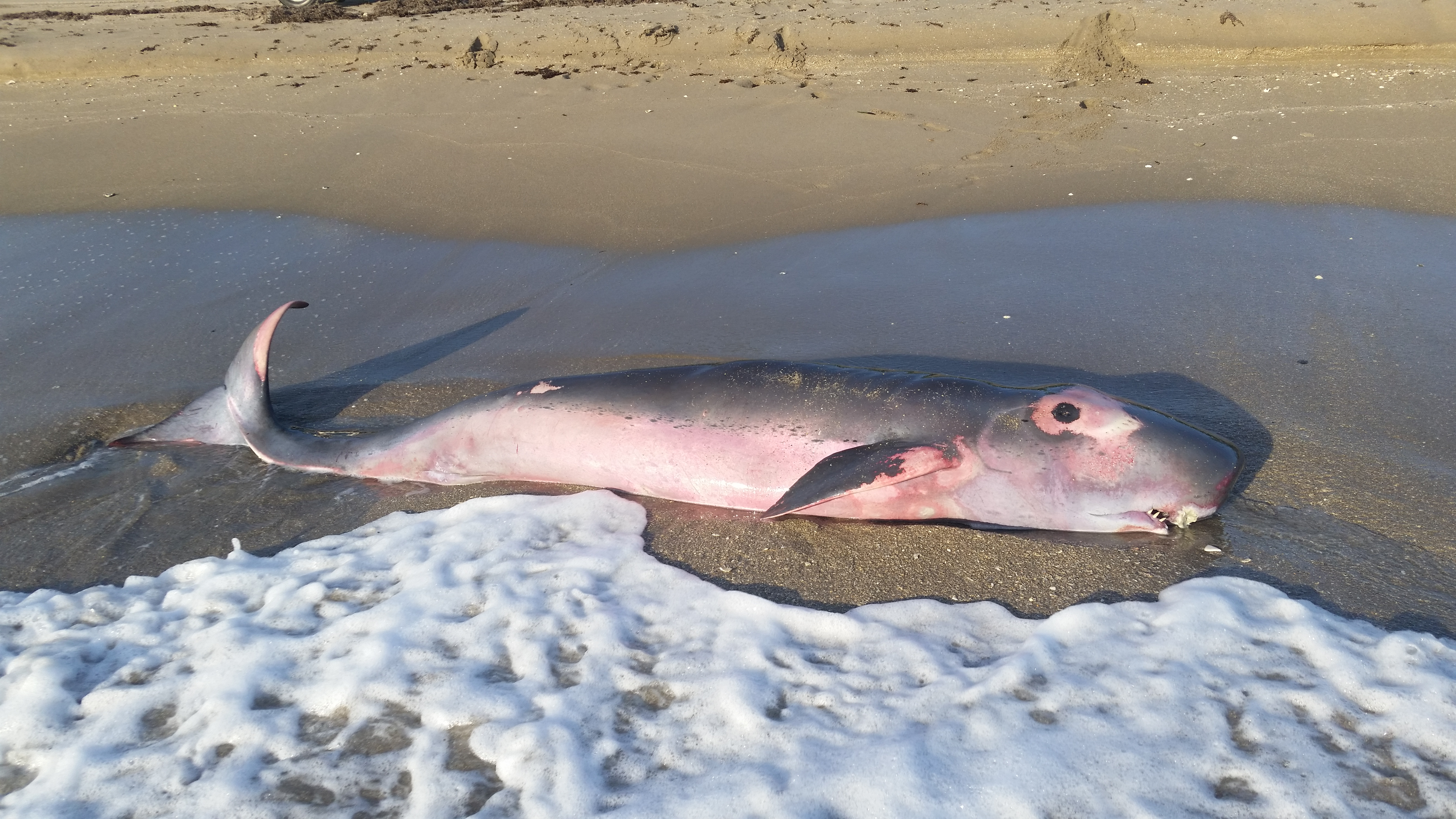

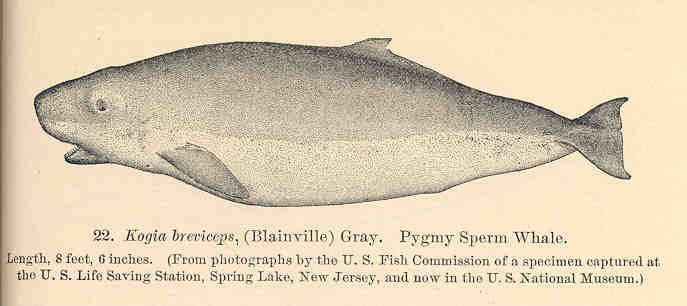

===== Species: Kogia sima (dwarf sperm whale) =====
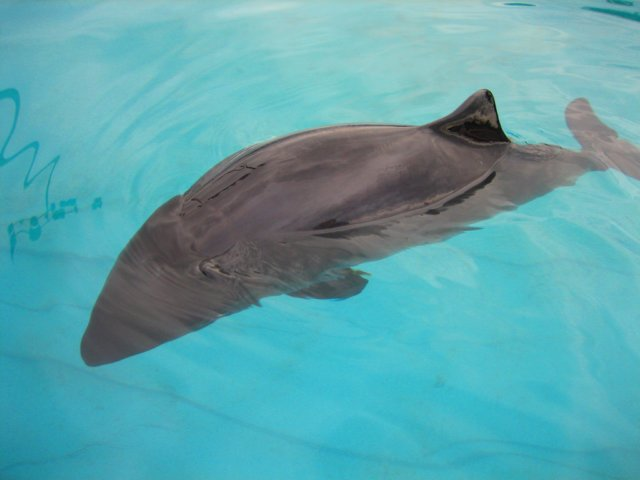

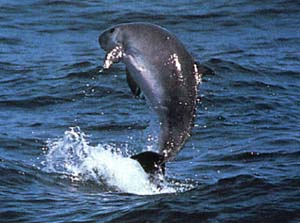

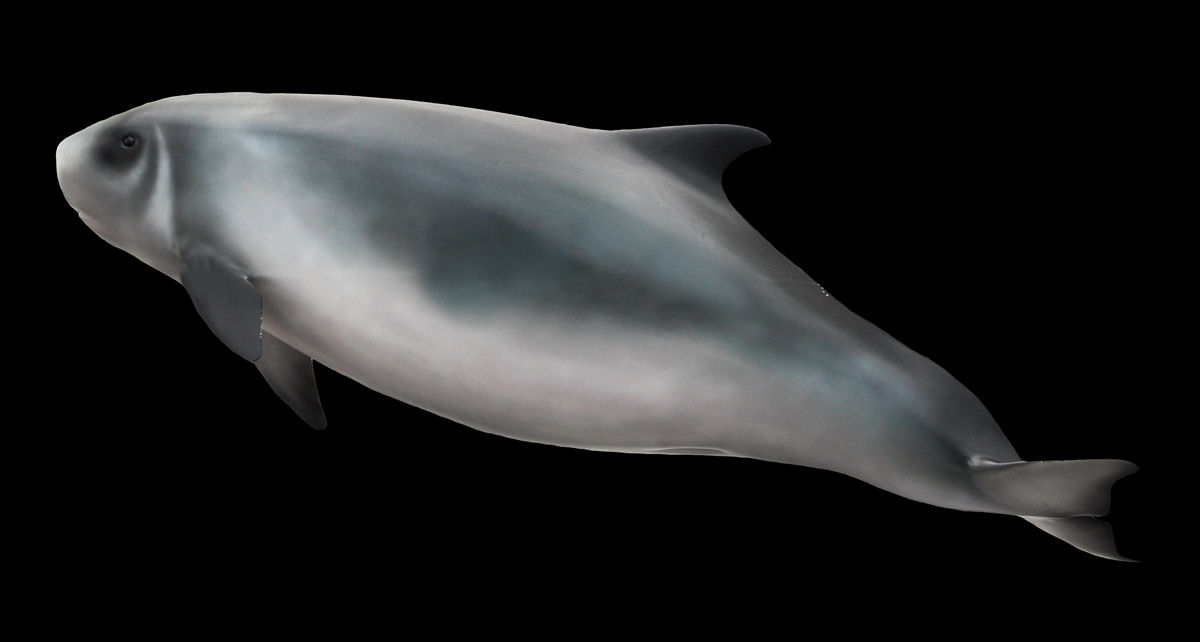

=== Family: Phocoenidae ===
==== Genus: Neophocaena ====
===== Species: Neophocaena phocaenoides (finless porpoise / എലിയനേടി) =====
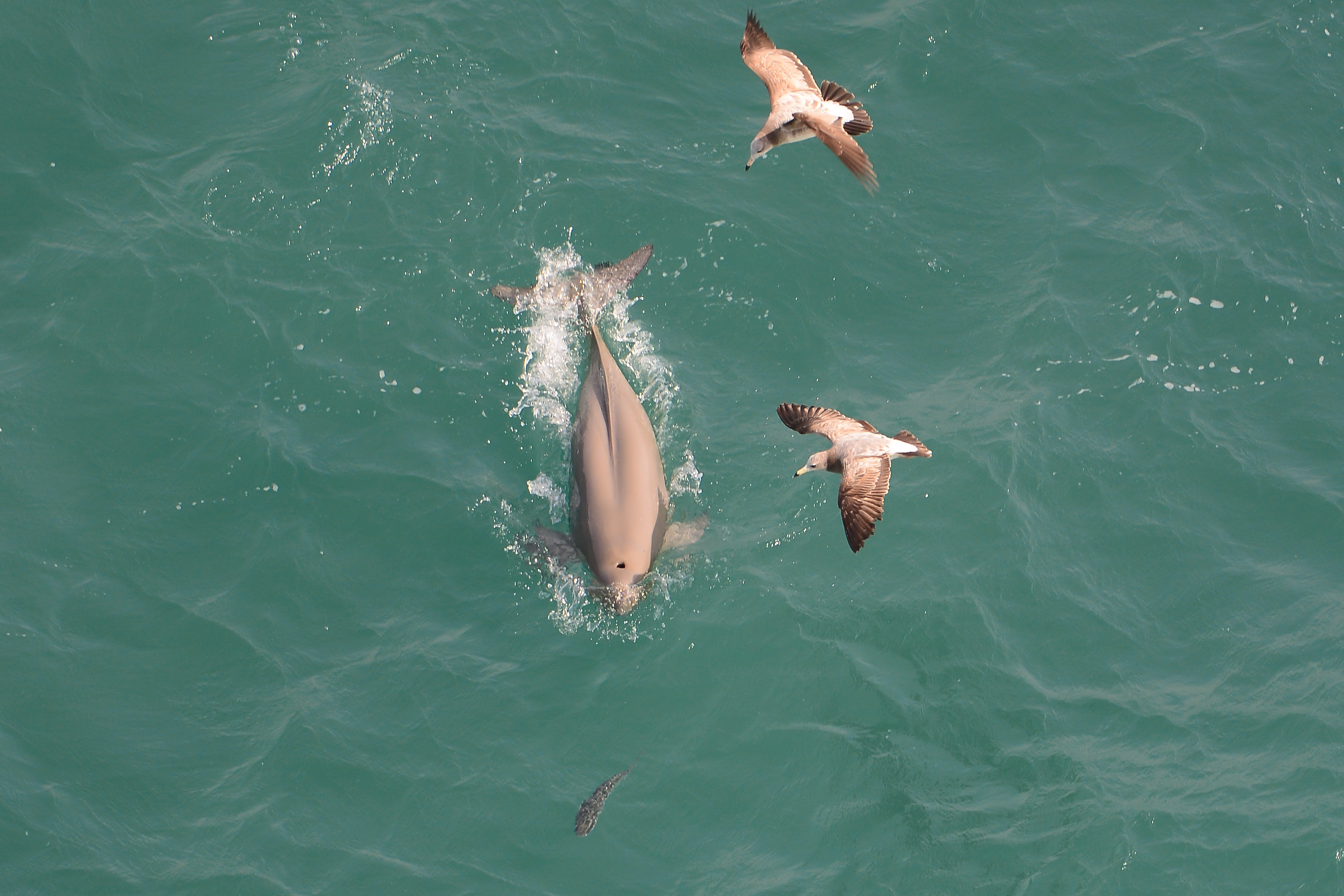

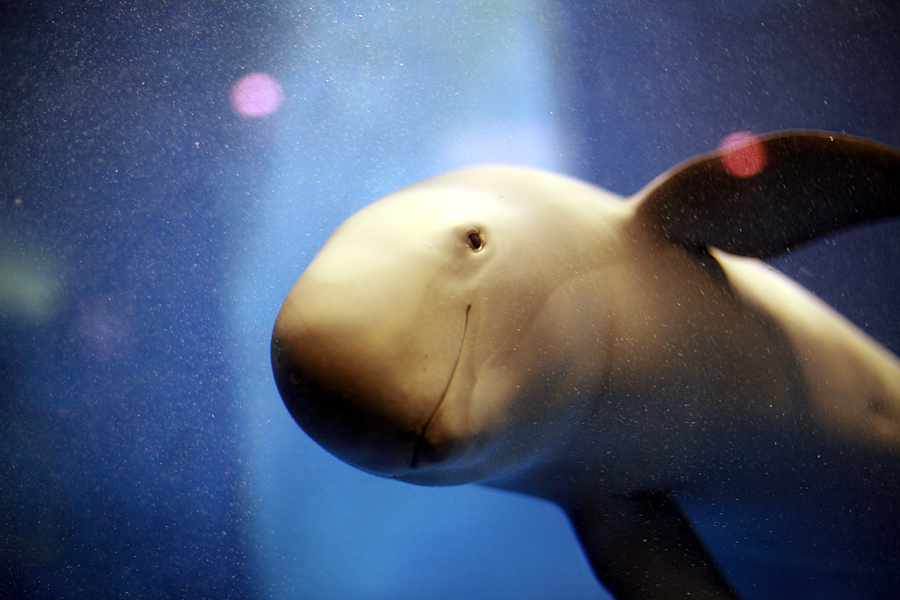

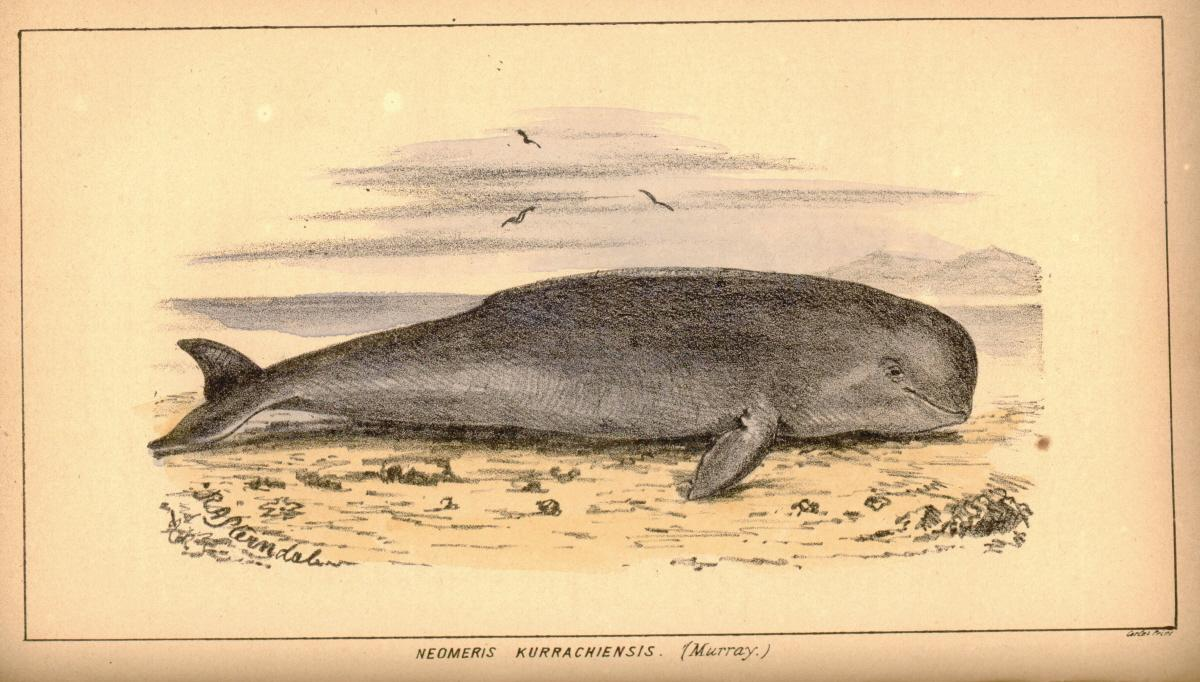

=== Family: Physeteridae ===
==== Genus: Physeter ====
===== Species: Physeter macrocephalus (sperm whale / എണ്ണത്തിമിംഗിലം) =====
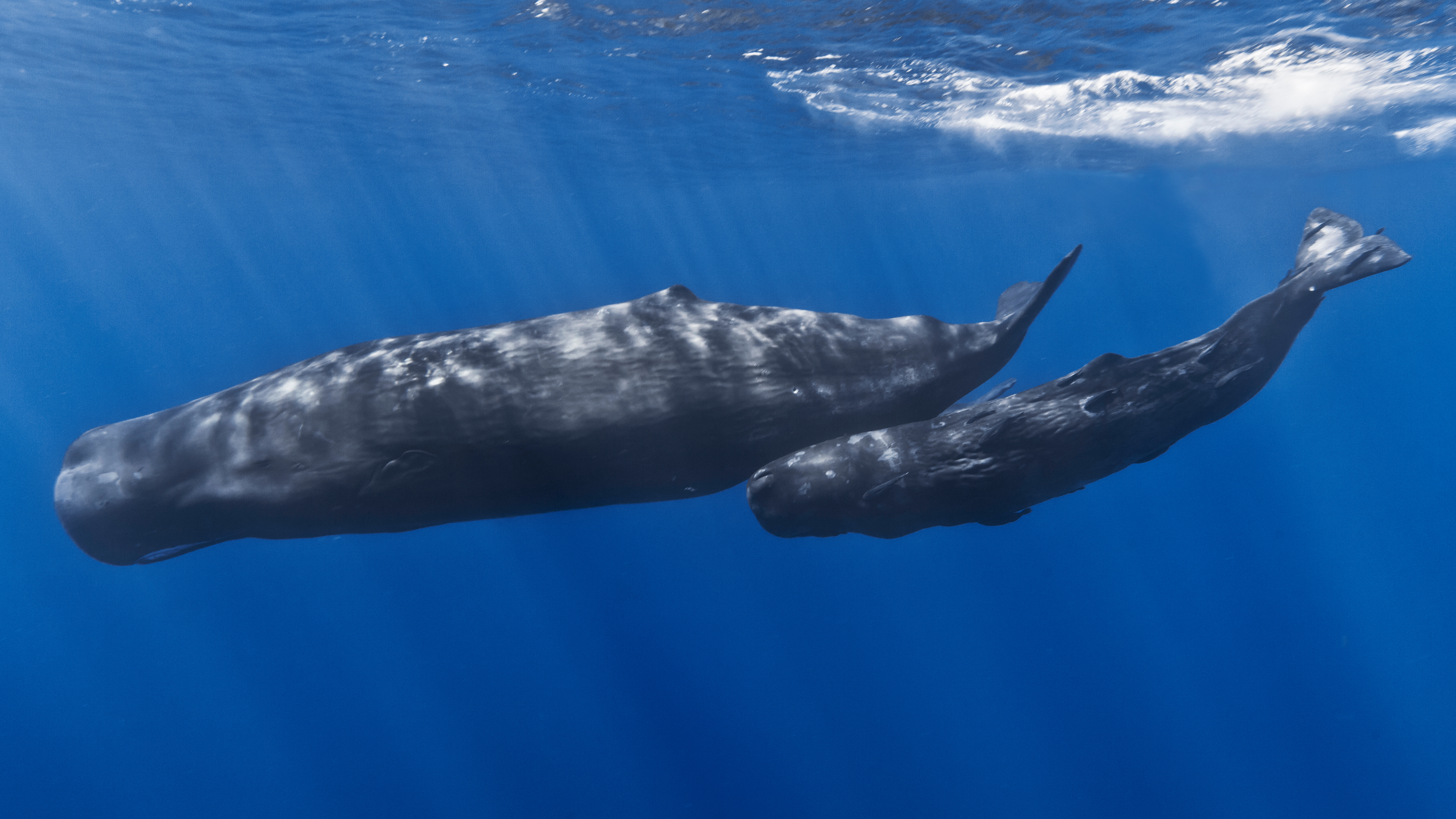

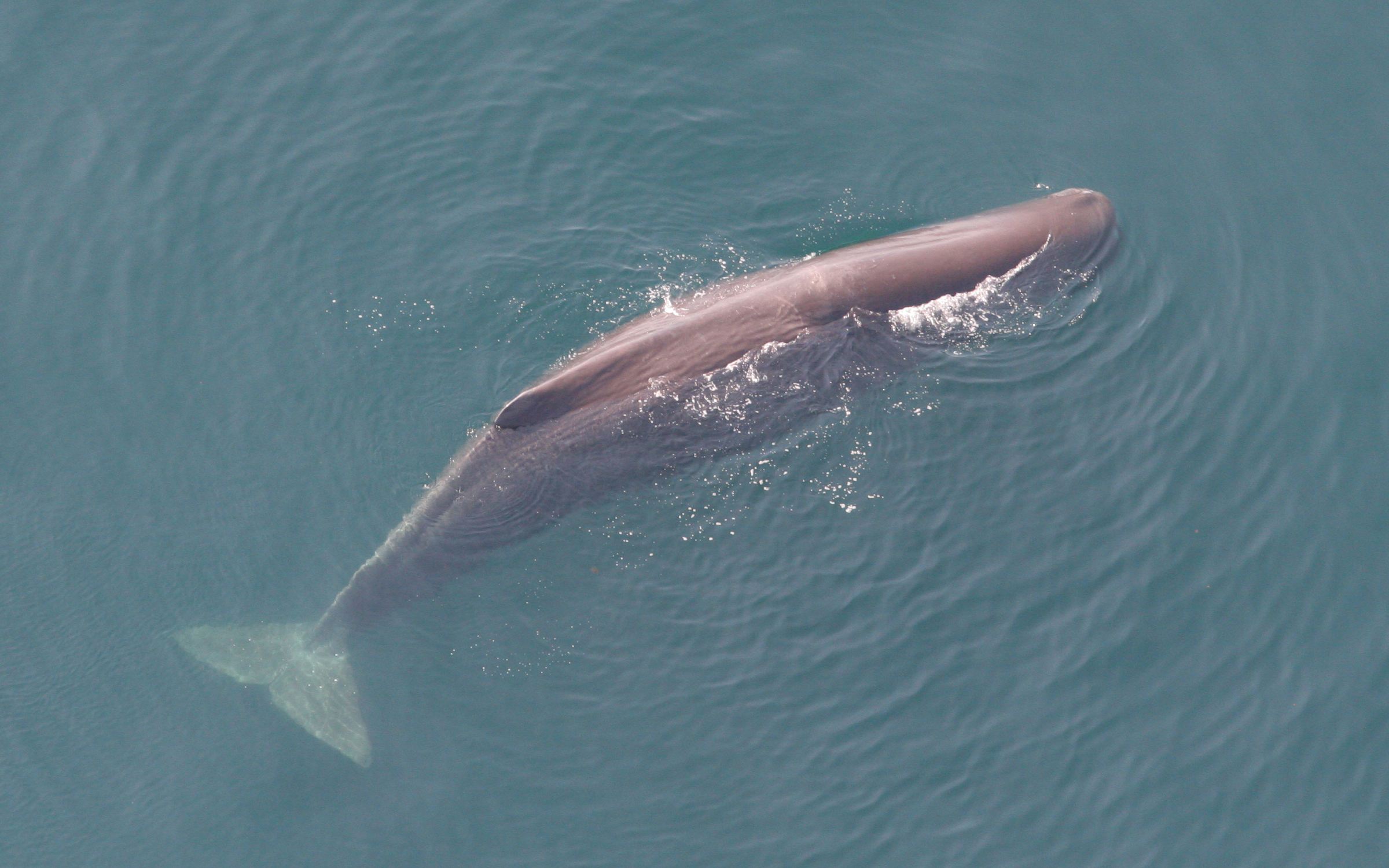

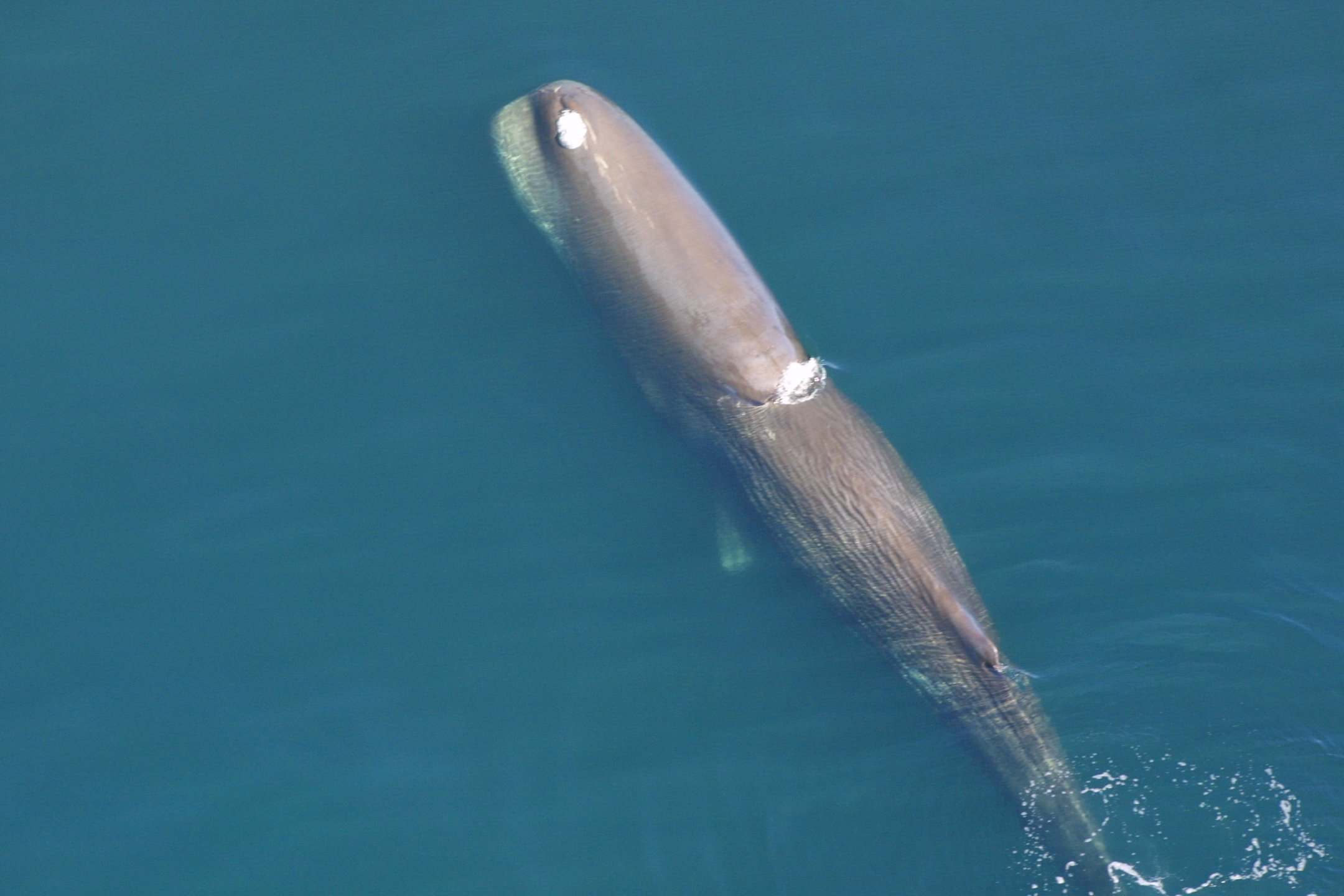

=== Family: Ziphiidae ===
==== Genus: Mesoplodon ====
===== Species: Mesoplodon densirostris (Blainville's beaked whale / ചുണ്ടൻ തിമിംഗിലം / കൊമ്പൻ തിമിംഗിലം) =====
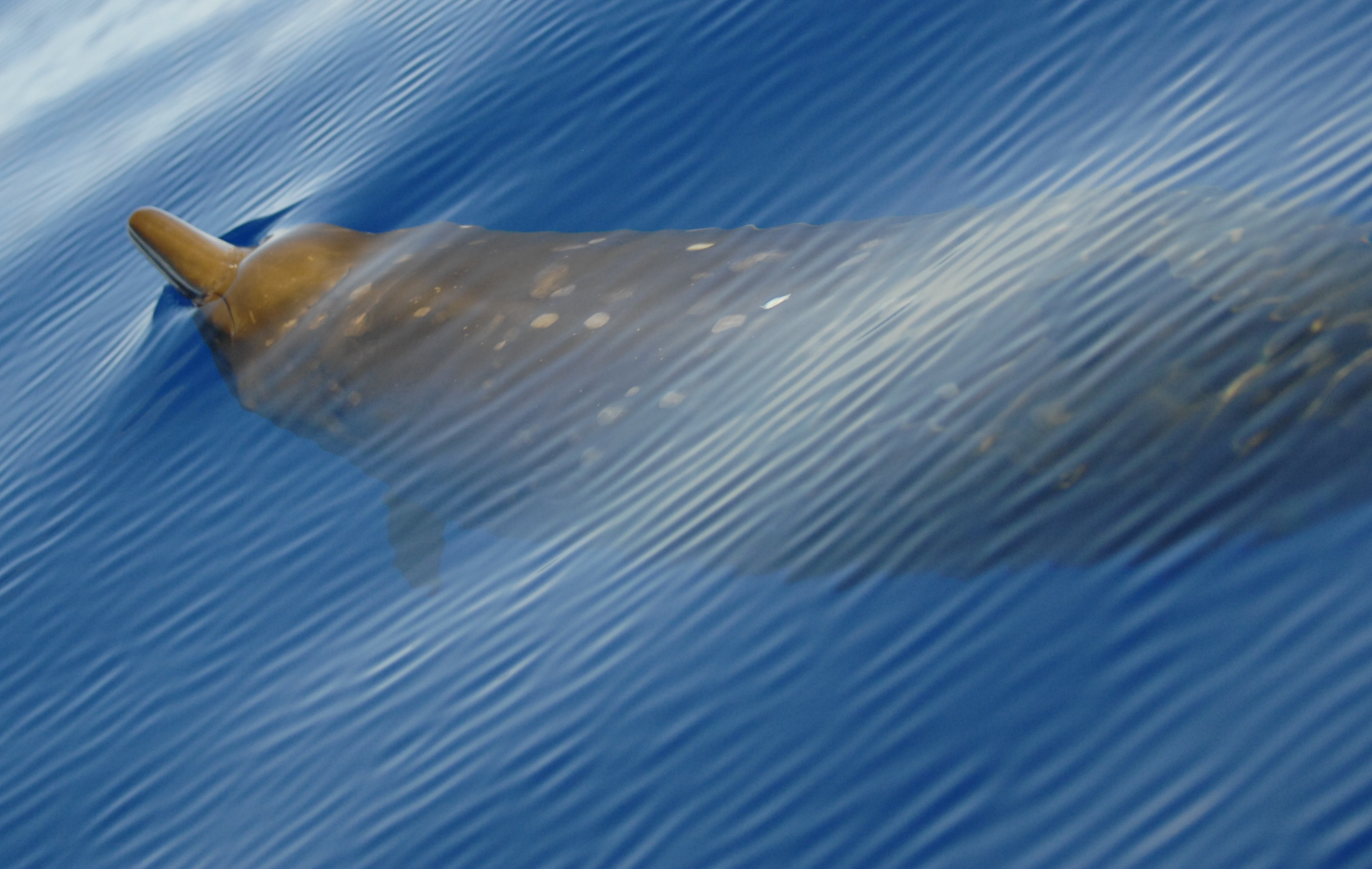

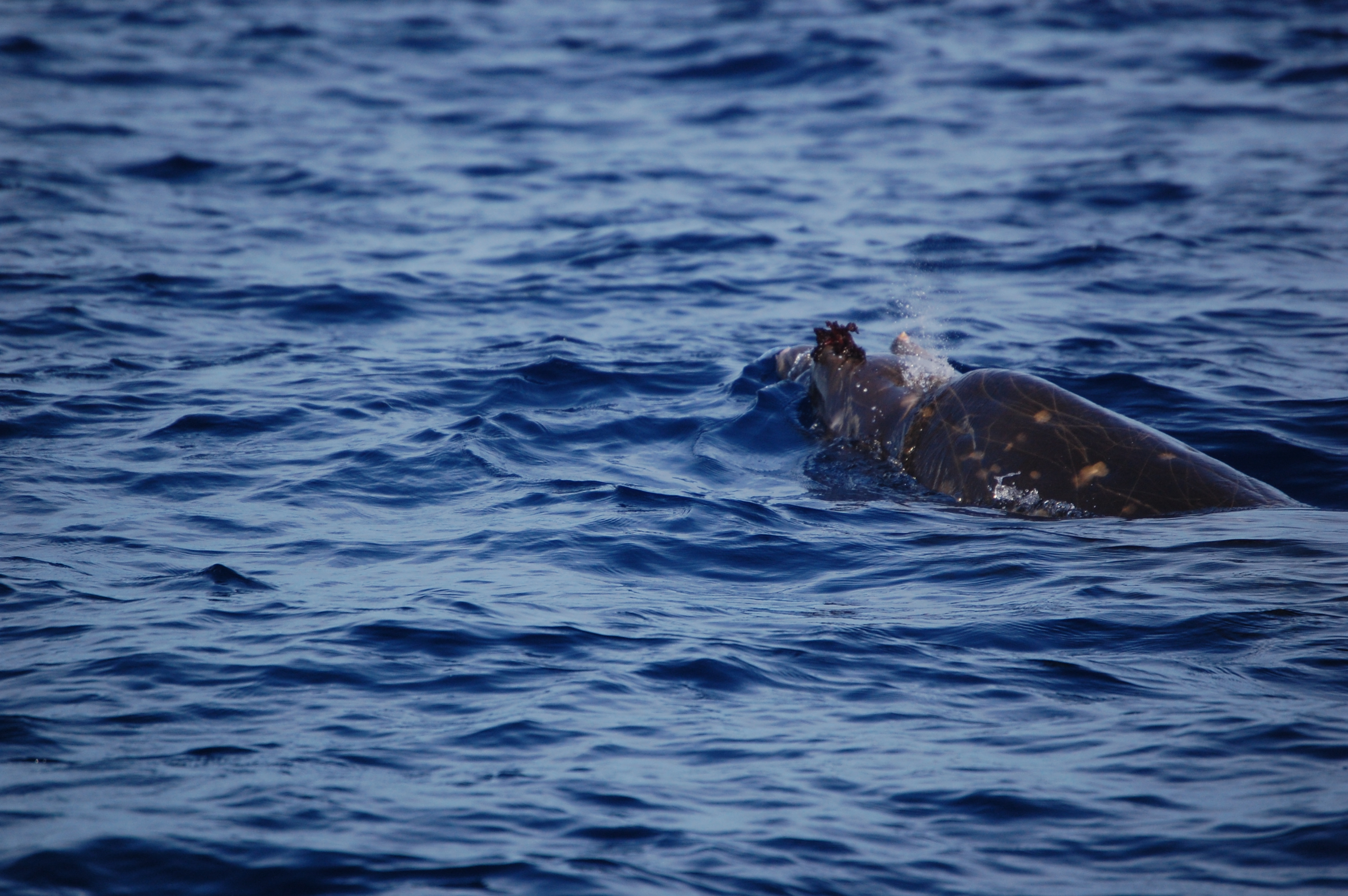

==== Genus: Ziphius ====
===== Species: Ziphius cavirostris (Cuvier's beaked whale / കുവിയറുടെ ചുണ്ടൻ തിമിംഗിലം) =====
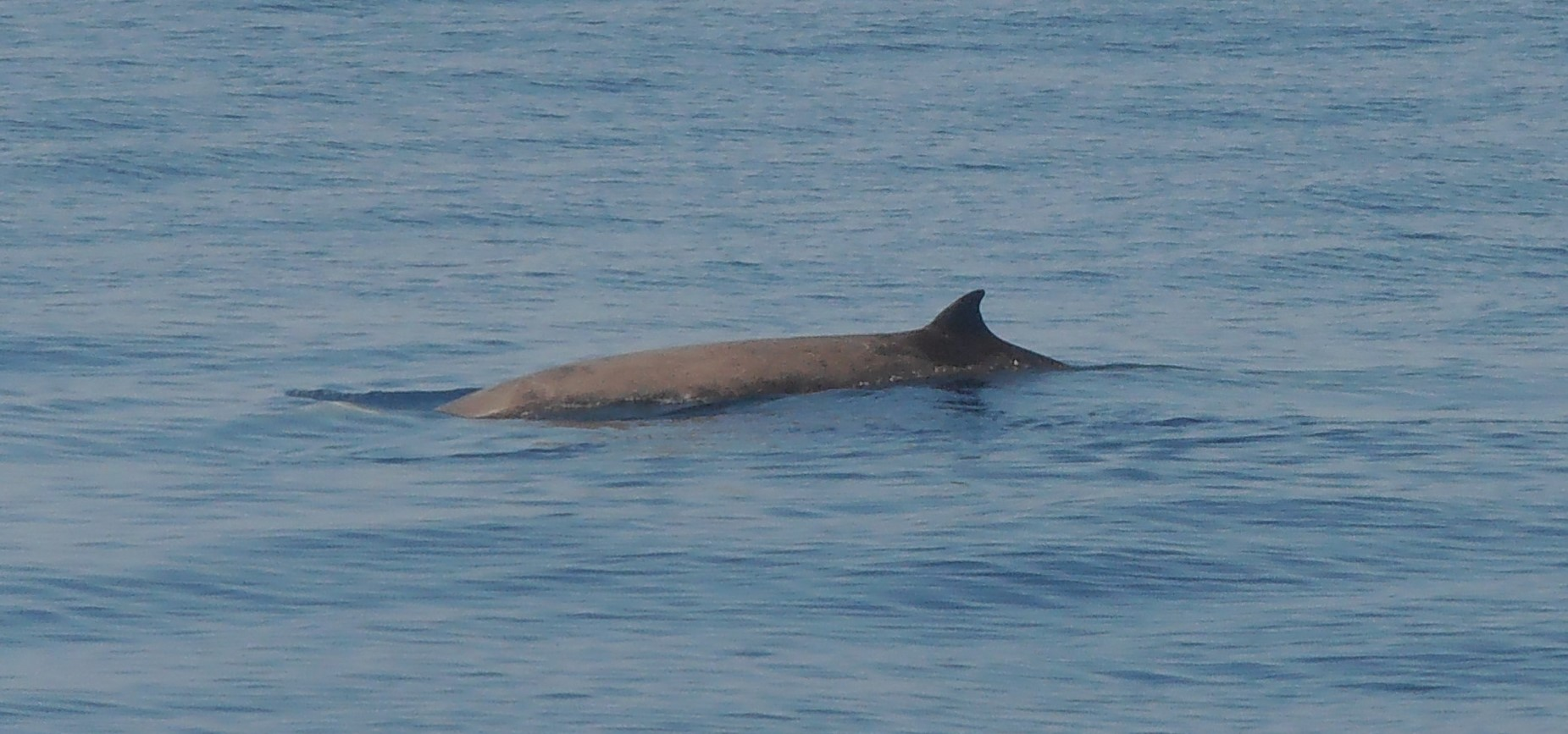

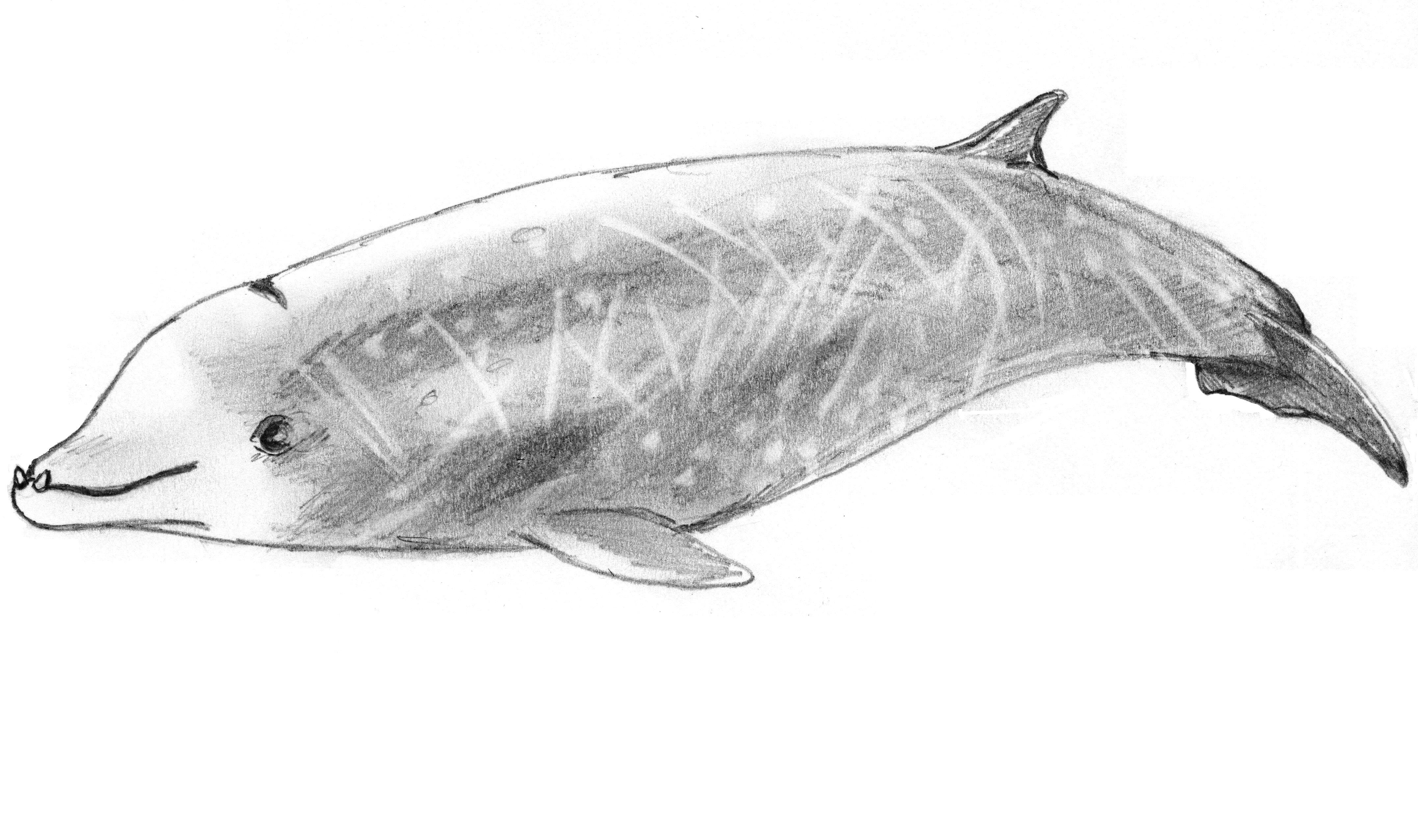

== Order: Chiroptera ==
=== Family: Emballonuridae ===
==== Genus: Saccolaimus ====
===== Species: Saccolaimus saccolaimus (naked-rumped pouched bat / സഞ്ചിവാഹി ഉറവാലൻവാവൽ) =====
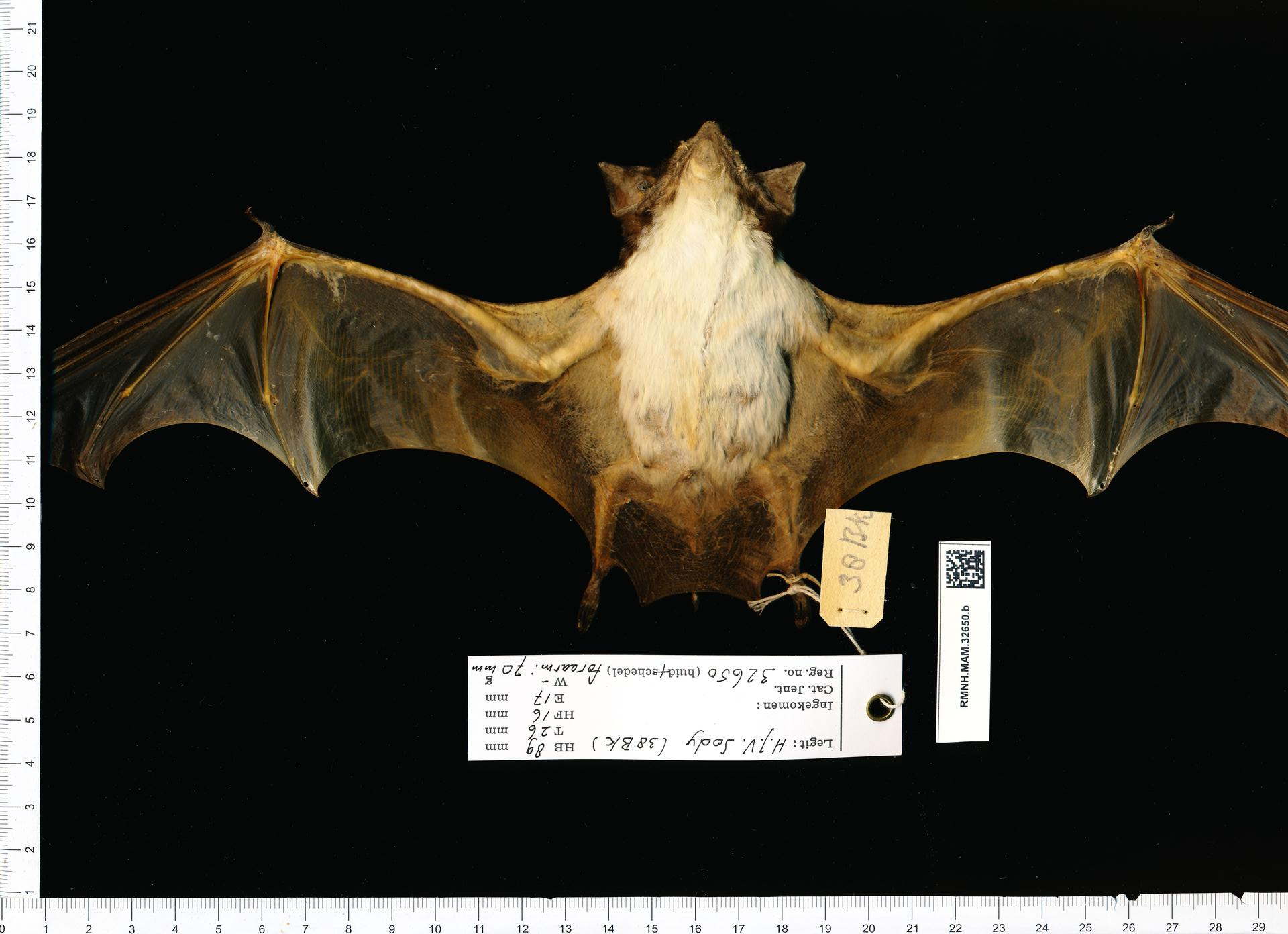

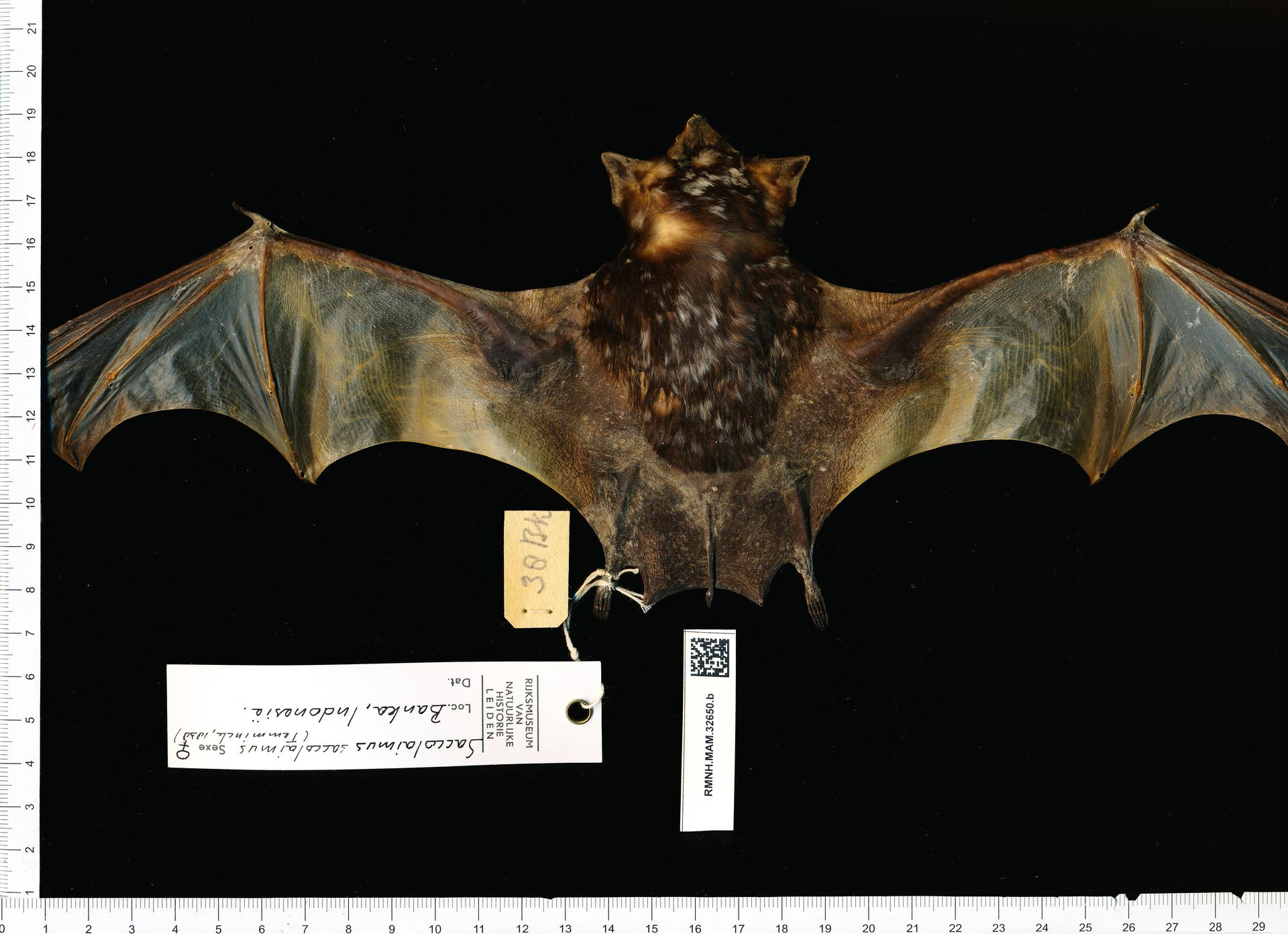

==== Genus: Taphozous ====
===== Species: Taphozous melanopogon (black-bearded tomb bat / കരിന്താടി ഉറവാലൻവാവൽ) =====
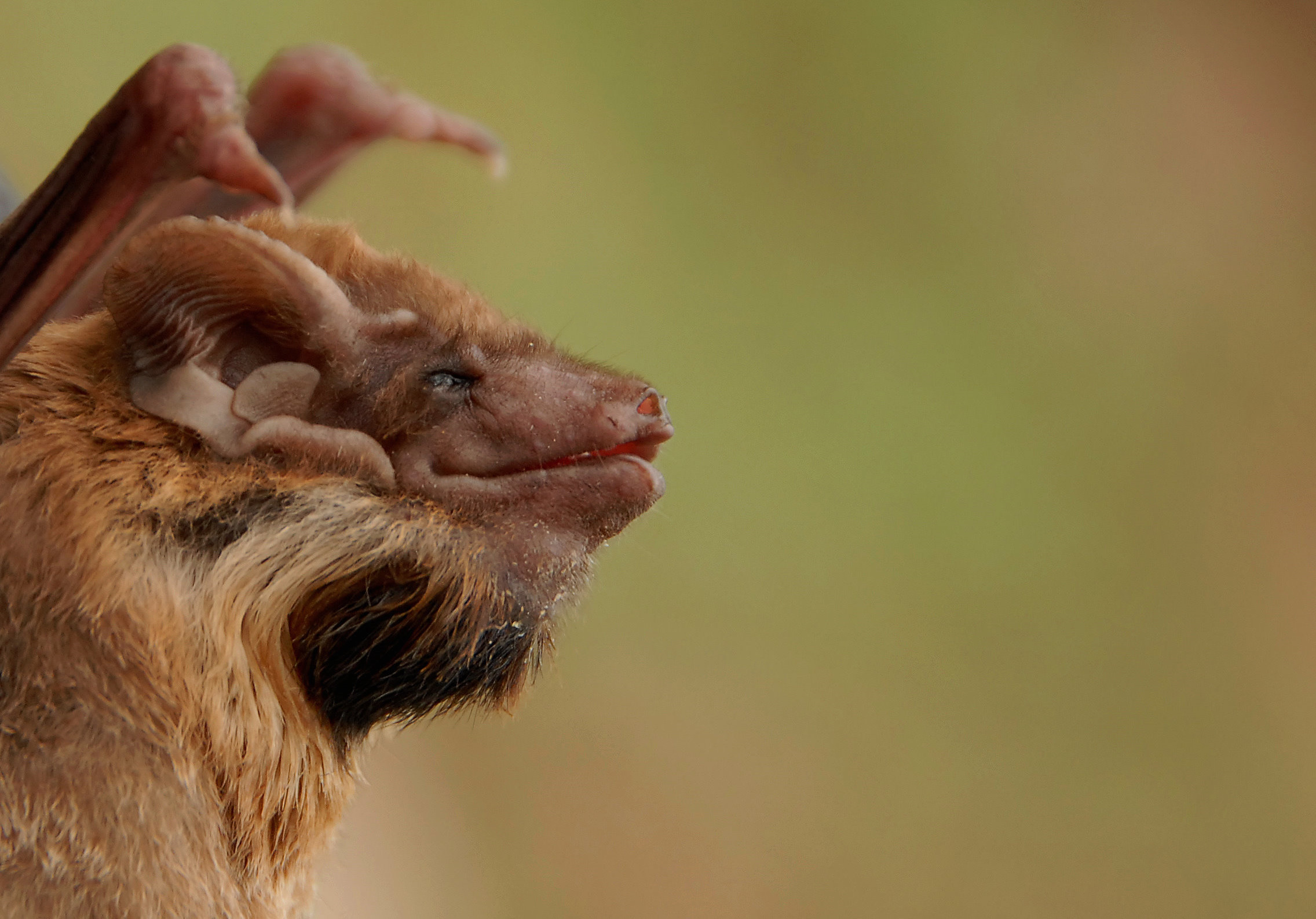

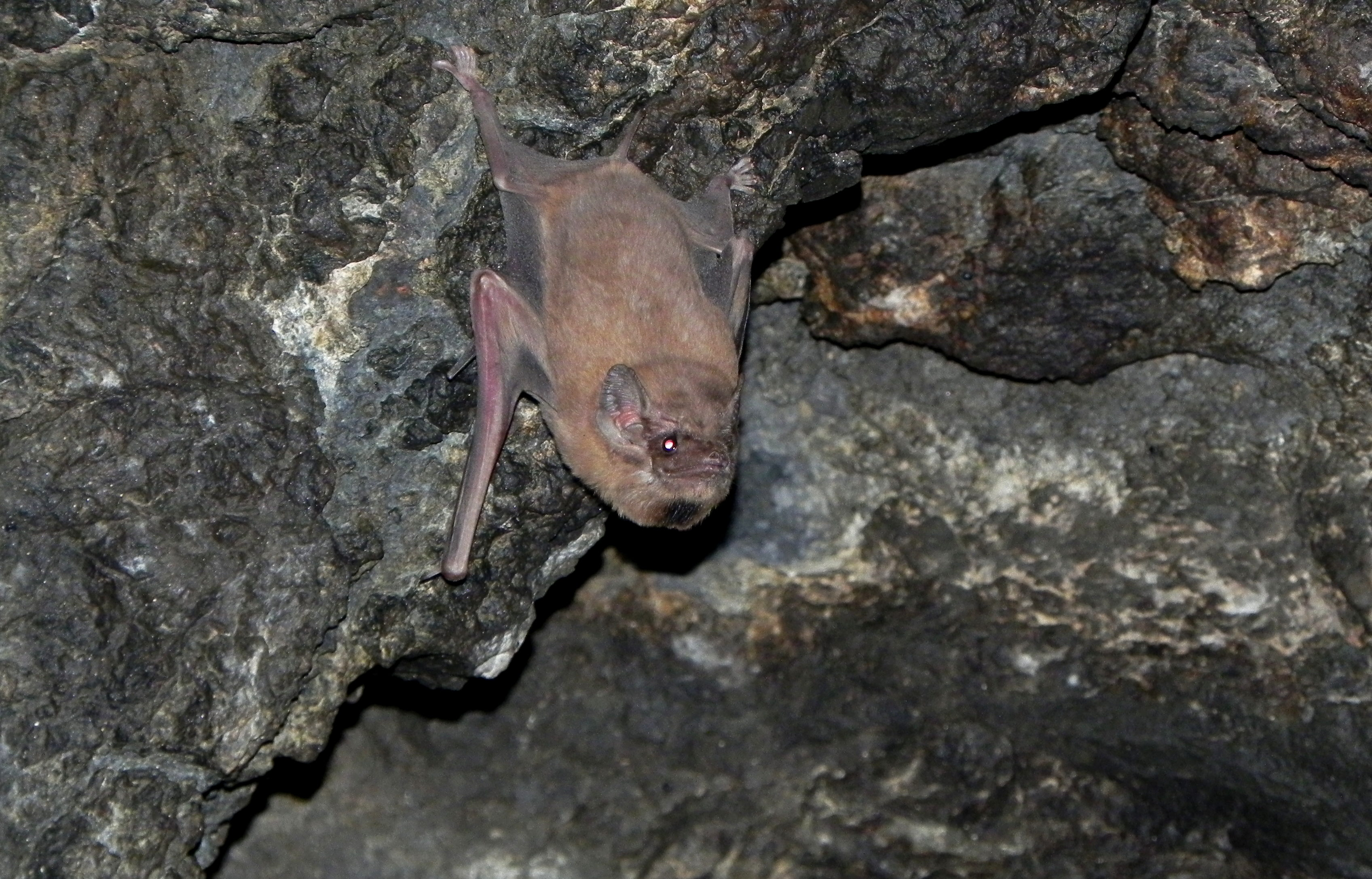

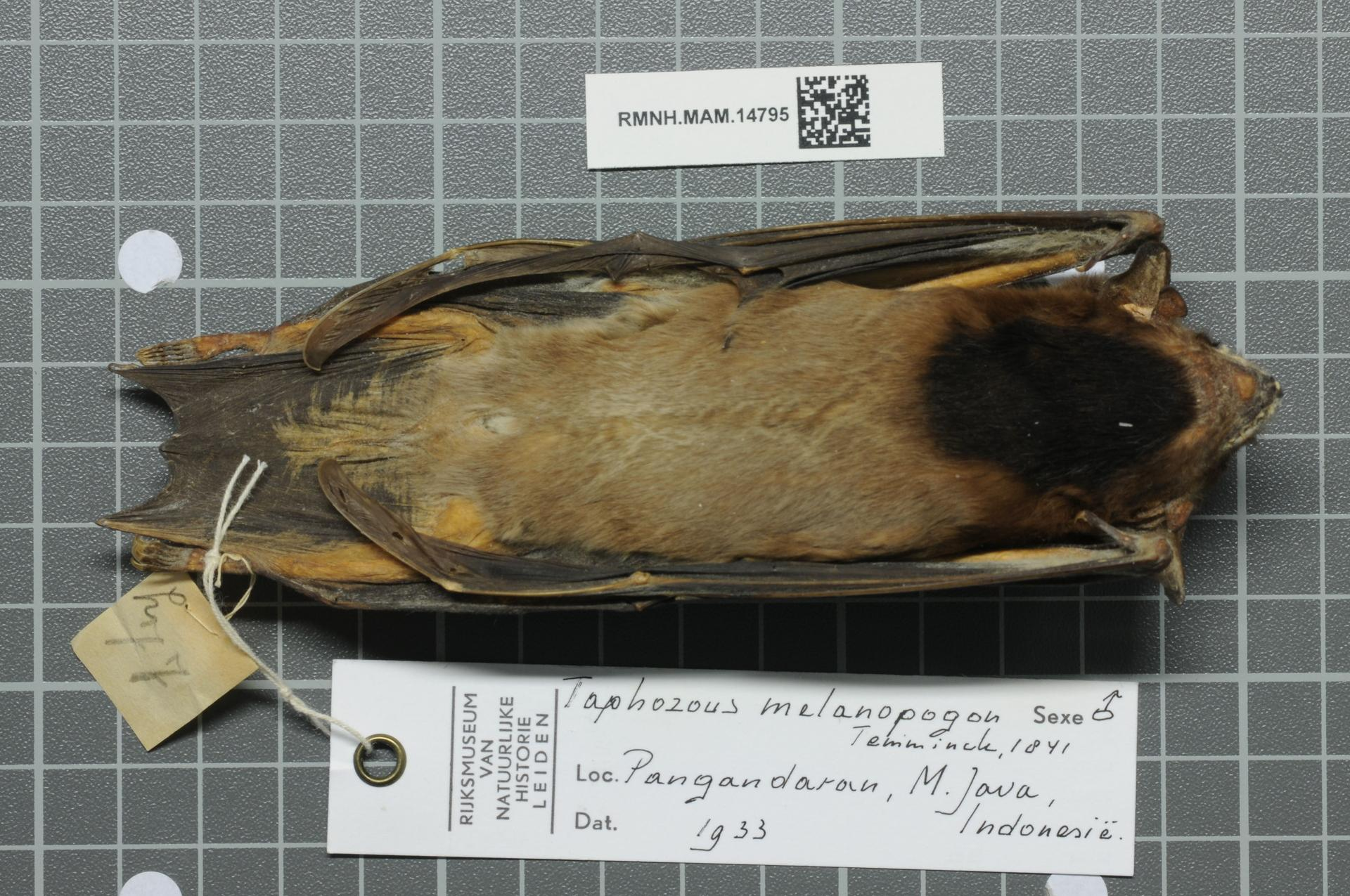

===== Species: Taphozous longimanus (long-winged tomb bat) =====
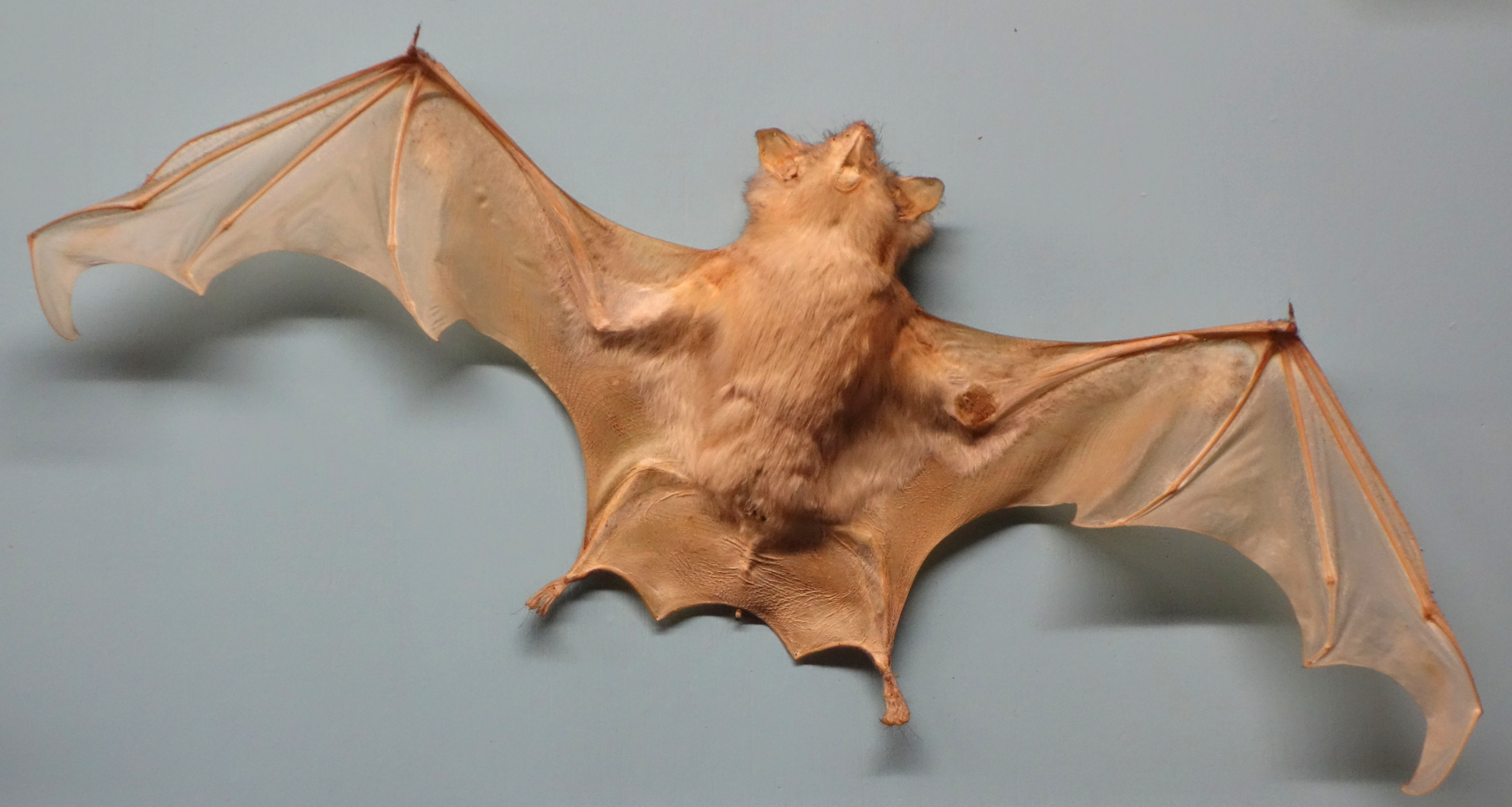

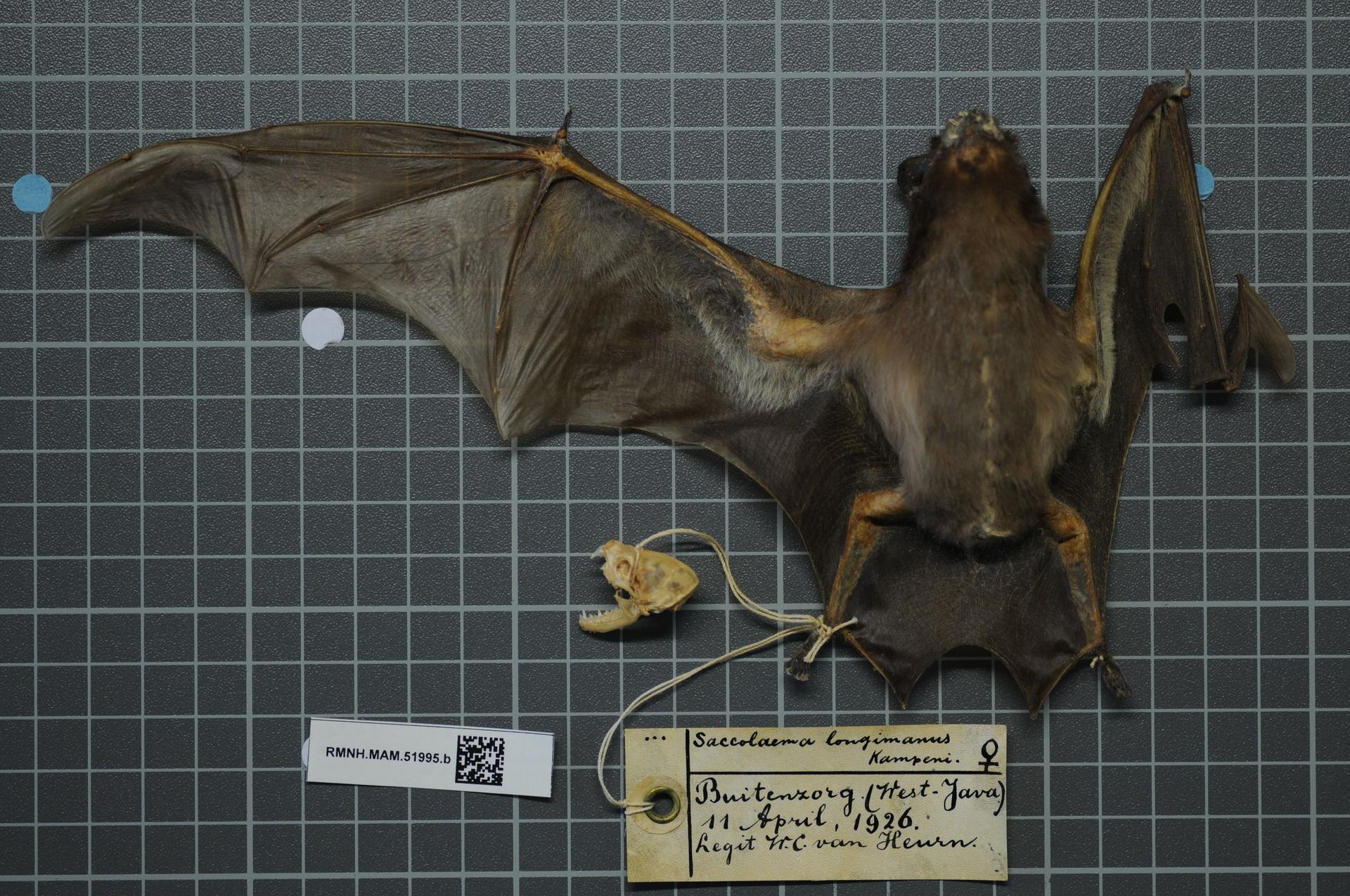

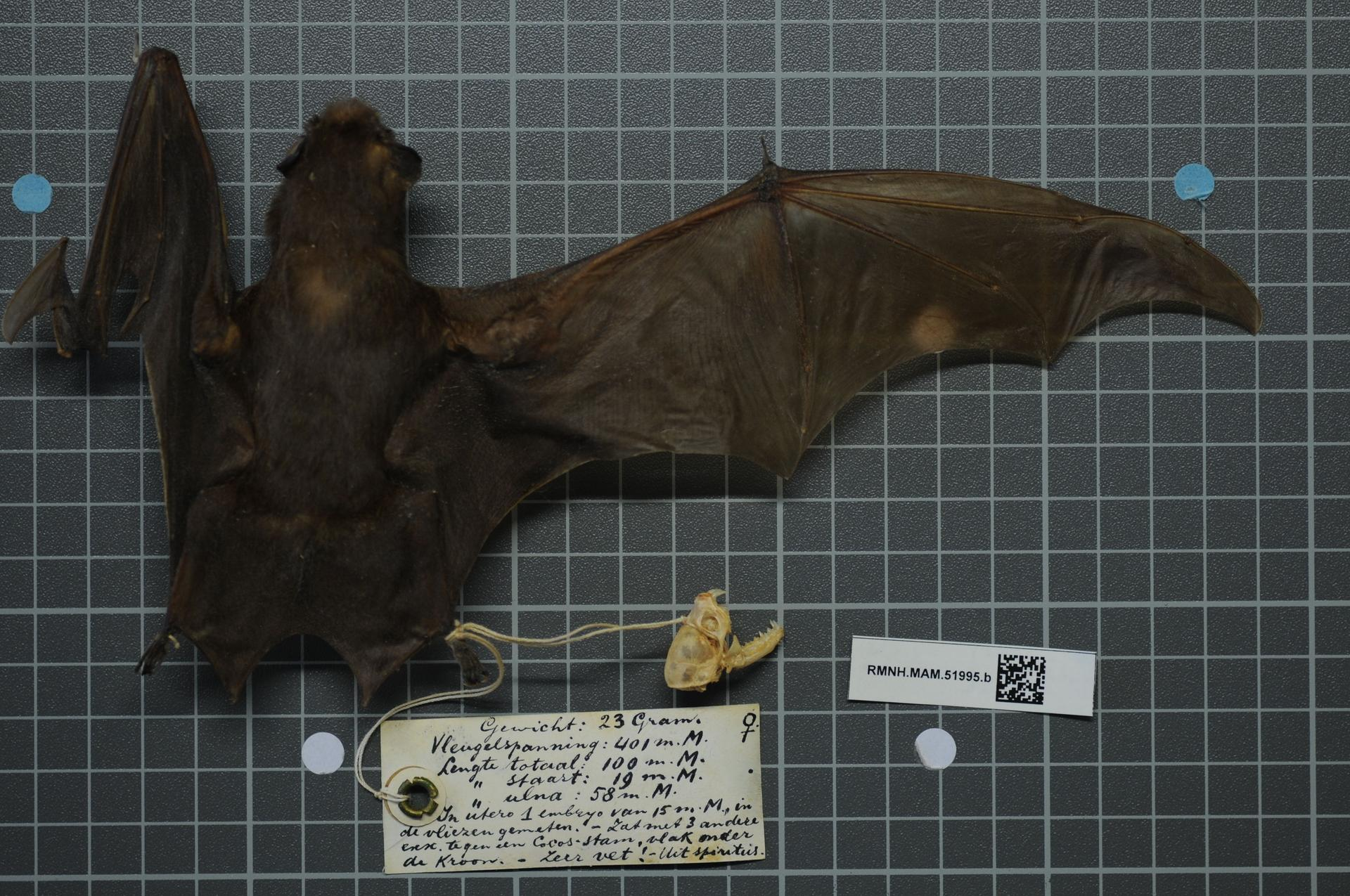

=== Family: Hipposideridae ===
==== Genus: Hipposideros ====
===== Species: Hipposideros ater (dusky leaf-nosed bat) =====
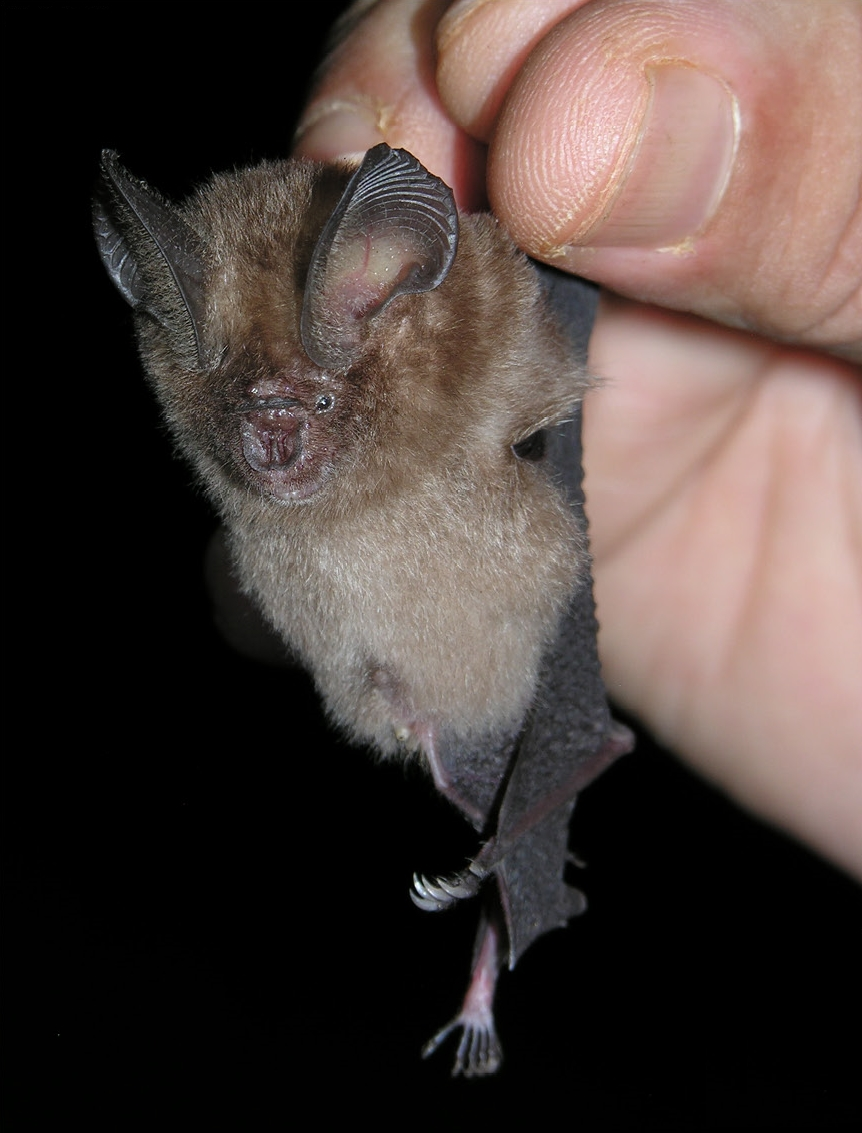

===== Species: Hipposideros fulvus (fulvus roundleaf bat / തവിടൻ ഇലമൂക്കൻവാവൽ) =====
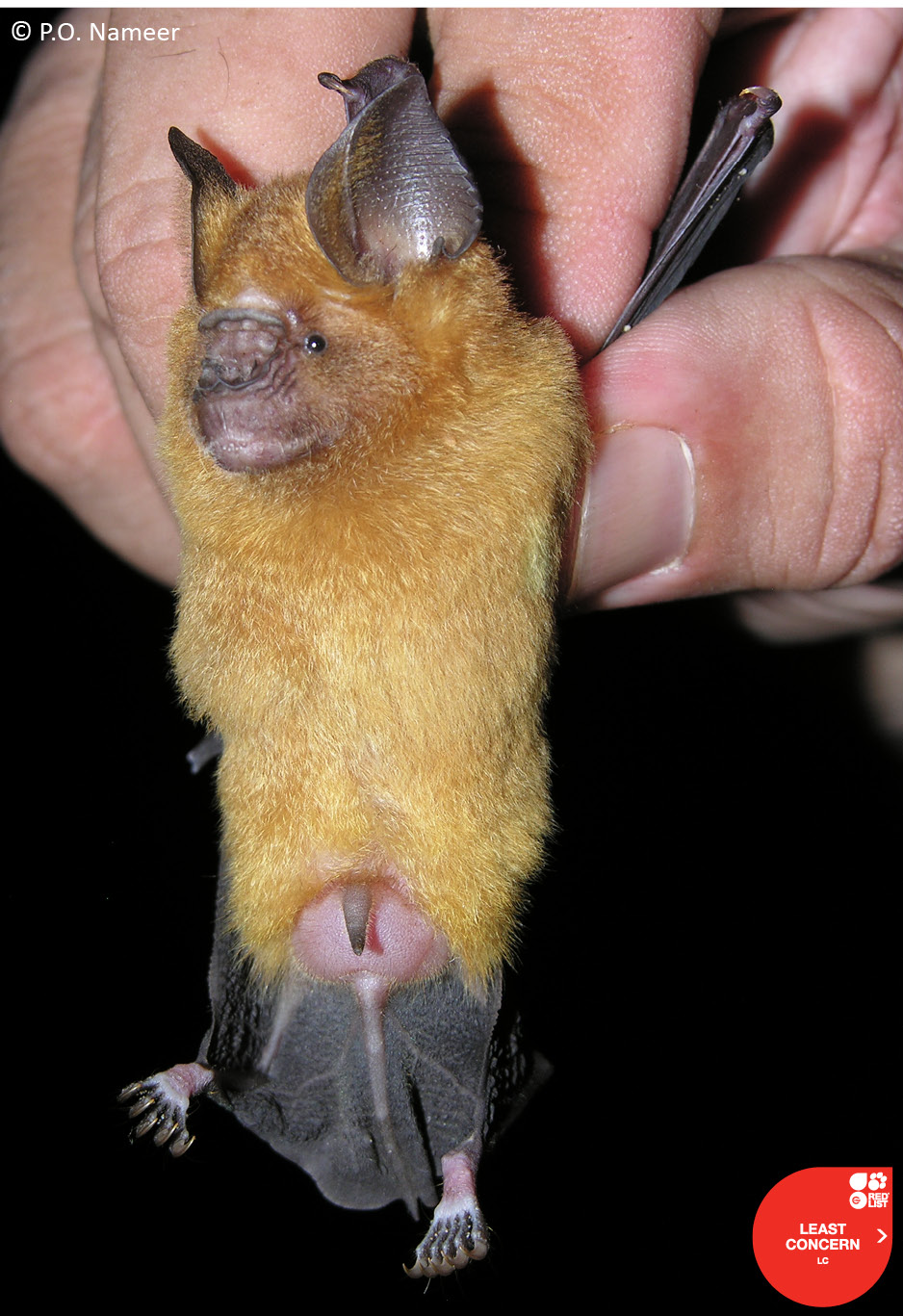

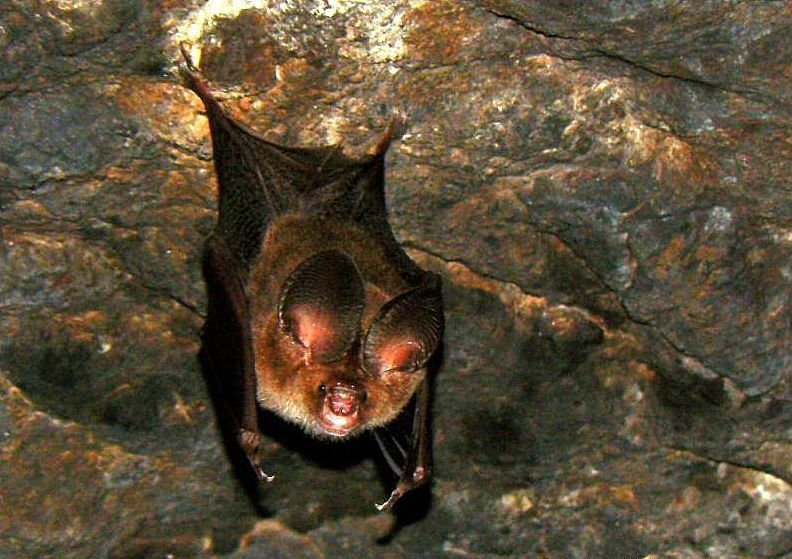

===== Species: Hipposideros speoris (Schneider's leaf-nosed bat / ഇന്ത്യൻ ഇലമൂക്കൻവാവൽ) =====
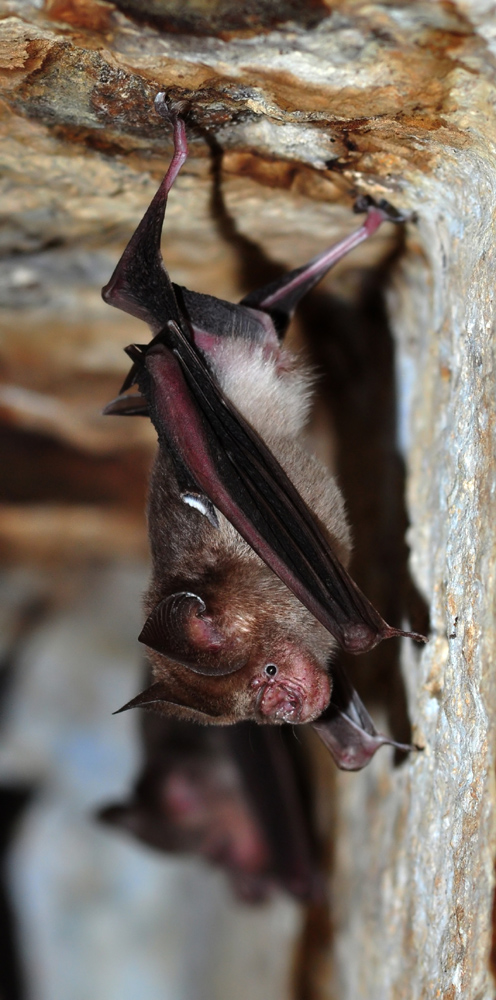

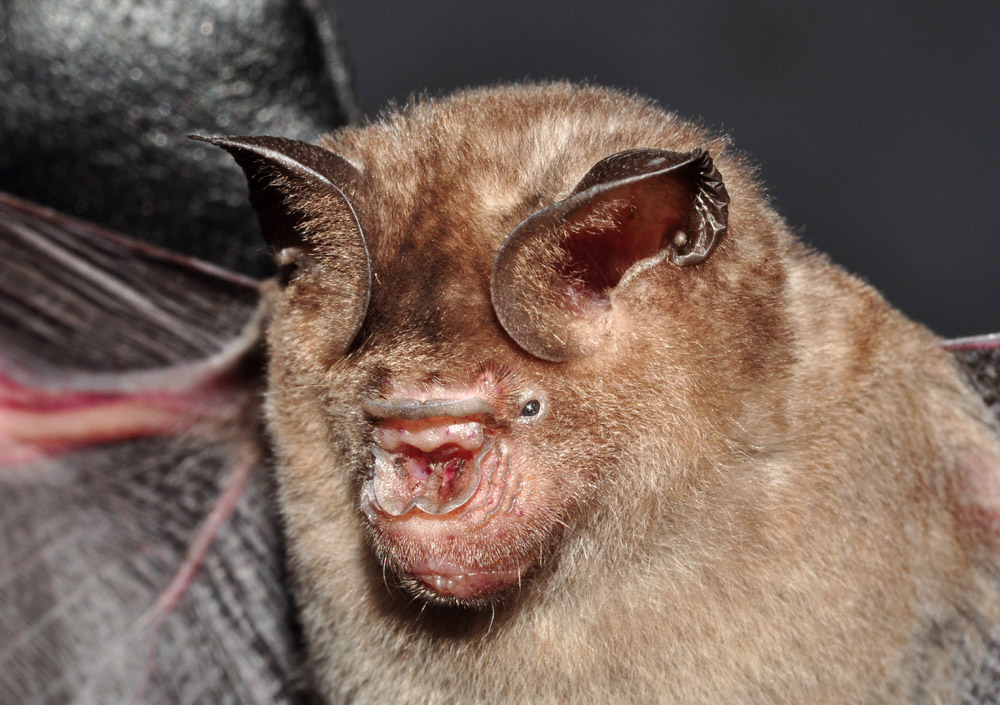

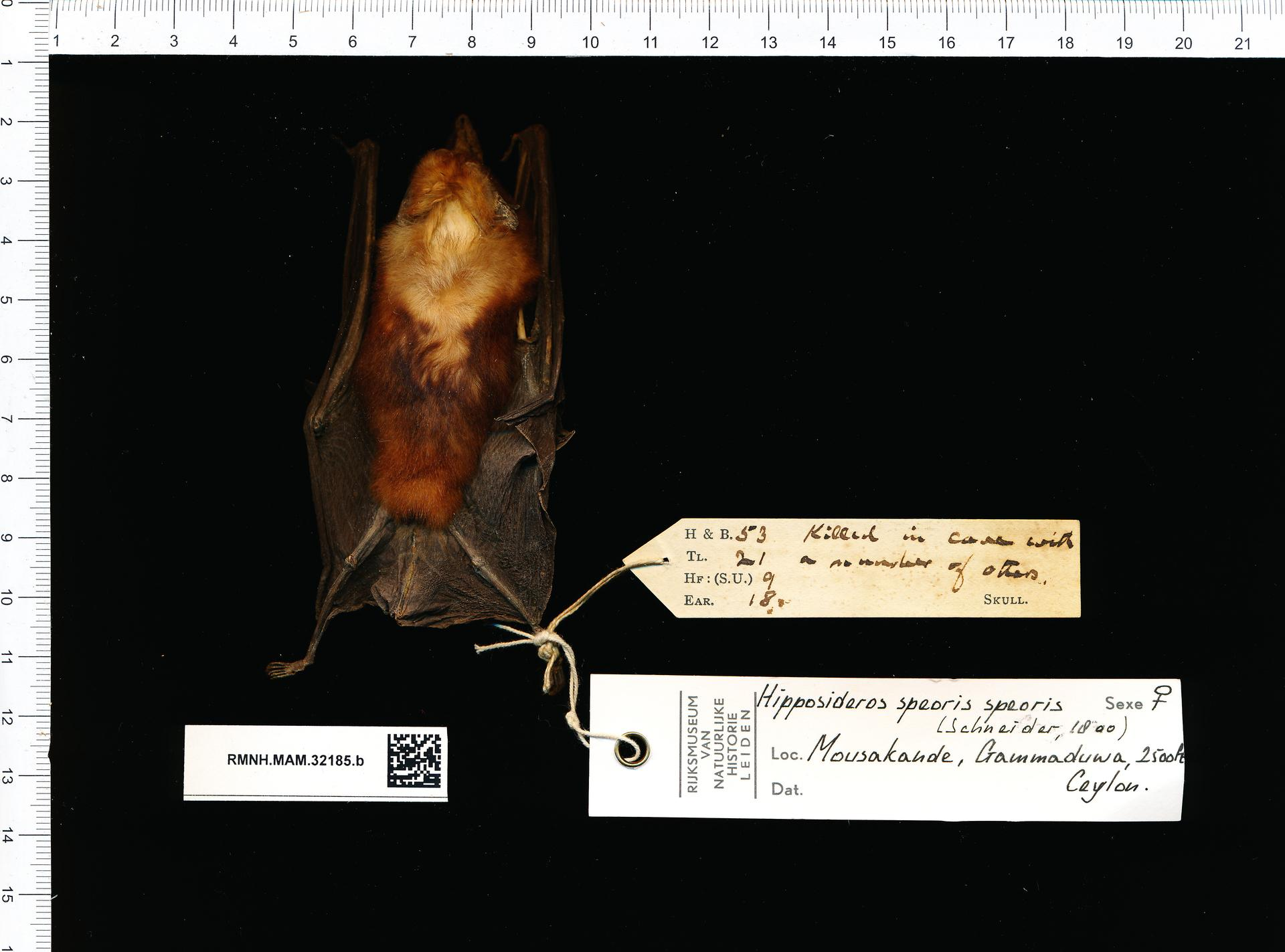

=== Family: Megadermatidae ===
==== Genus: Megaderma ====
===== Species: Megaderma lyra (greater false vampire bat) =====
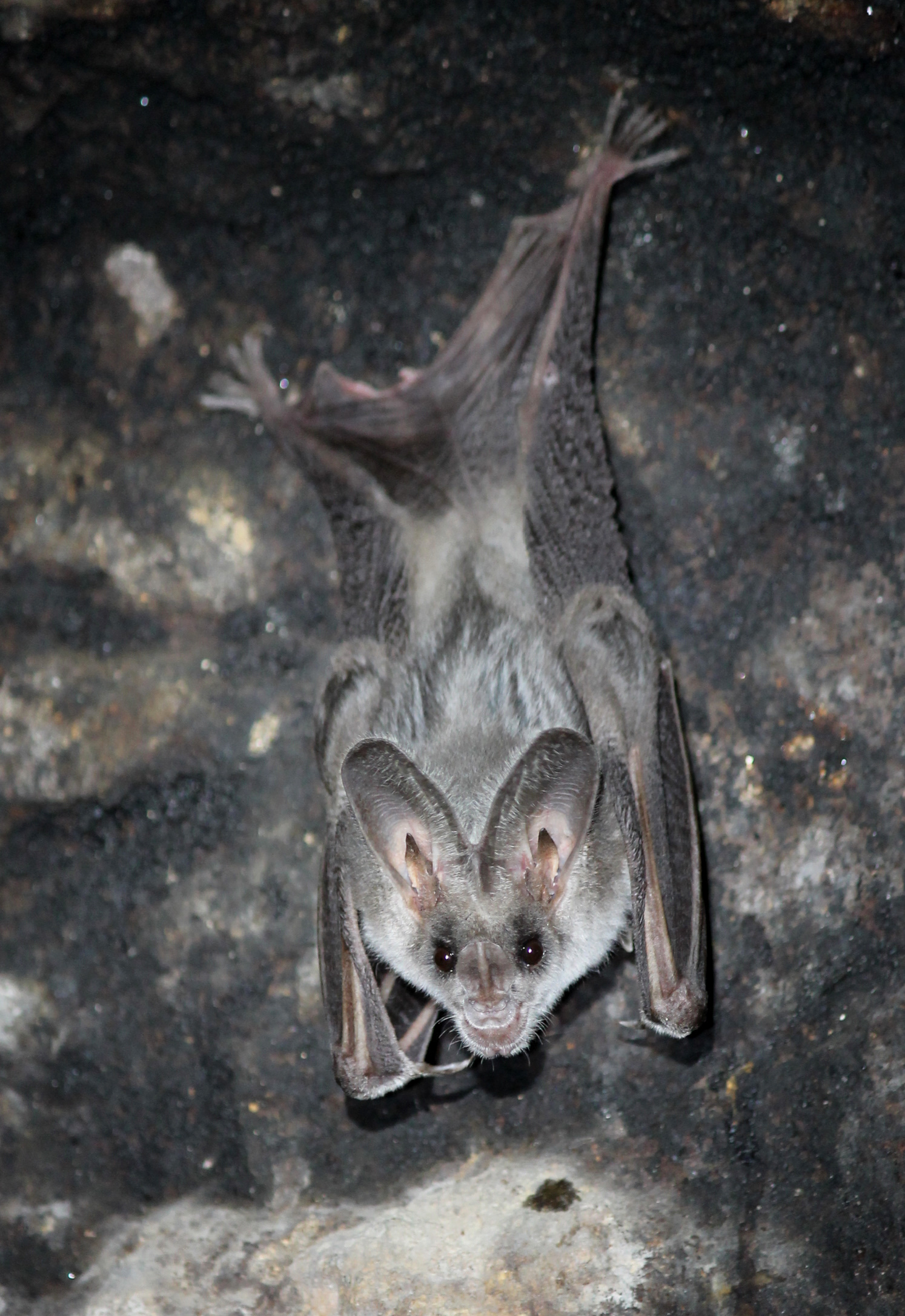

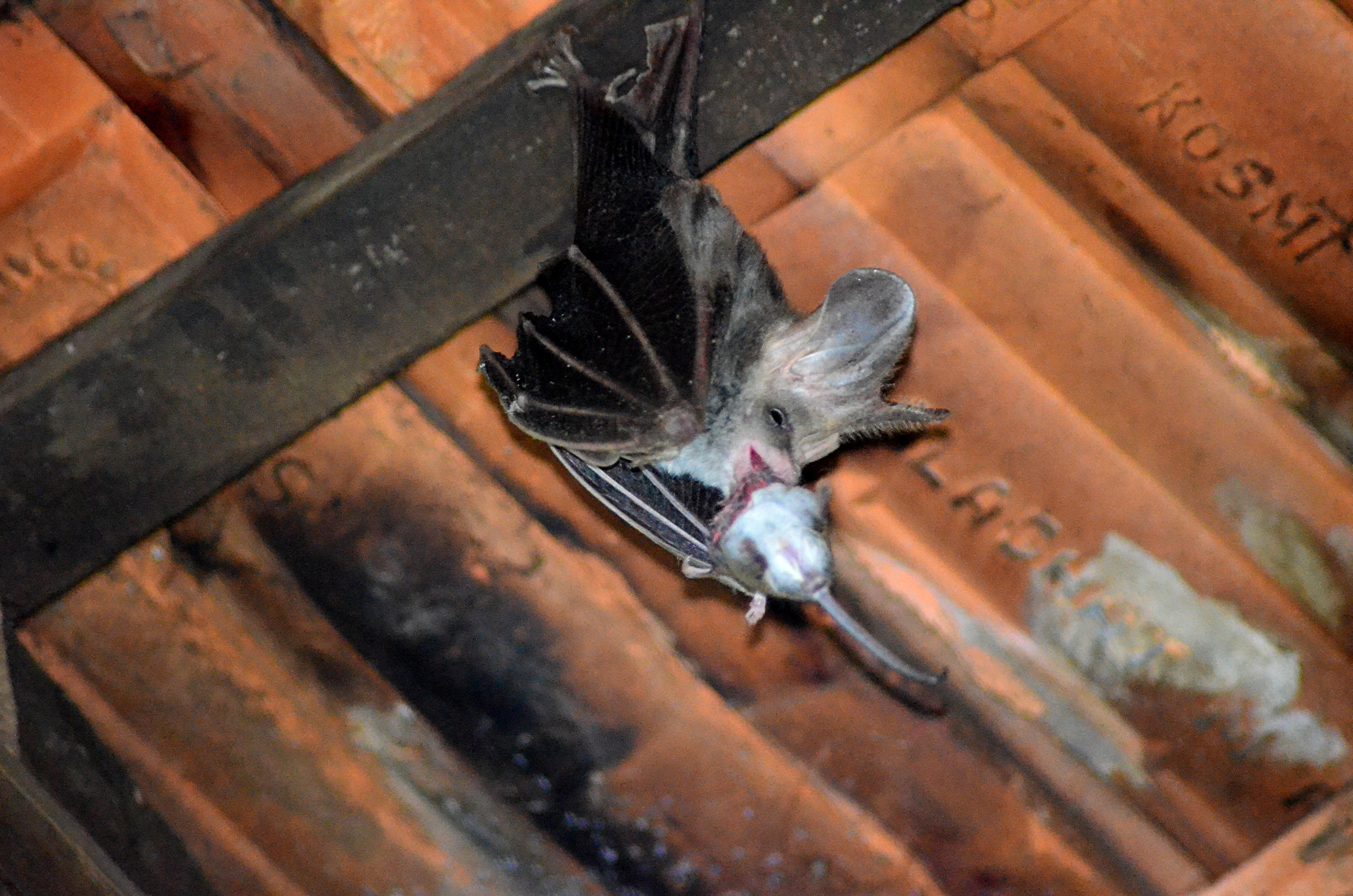

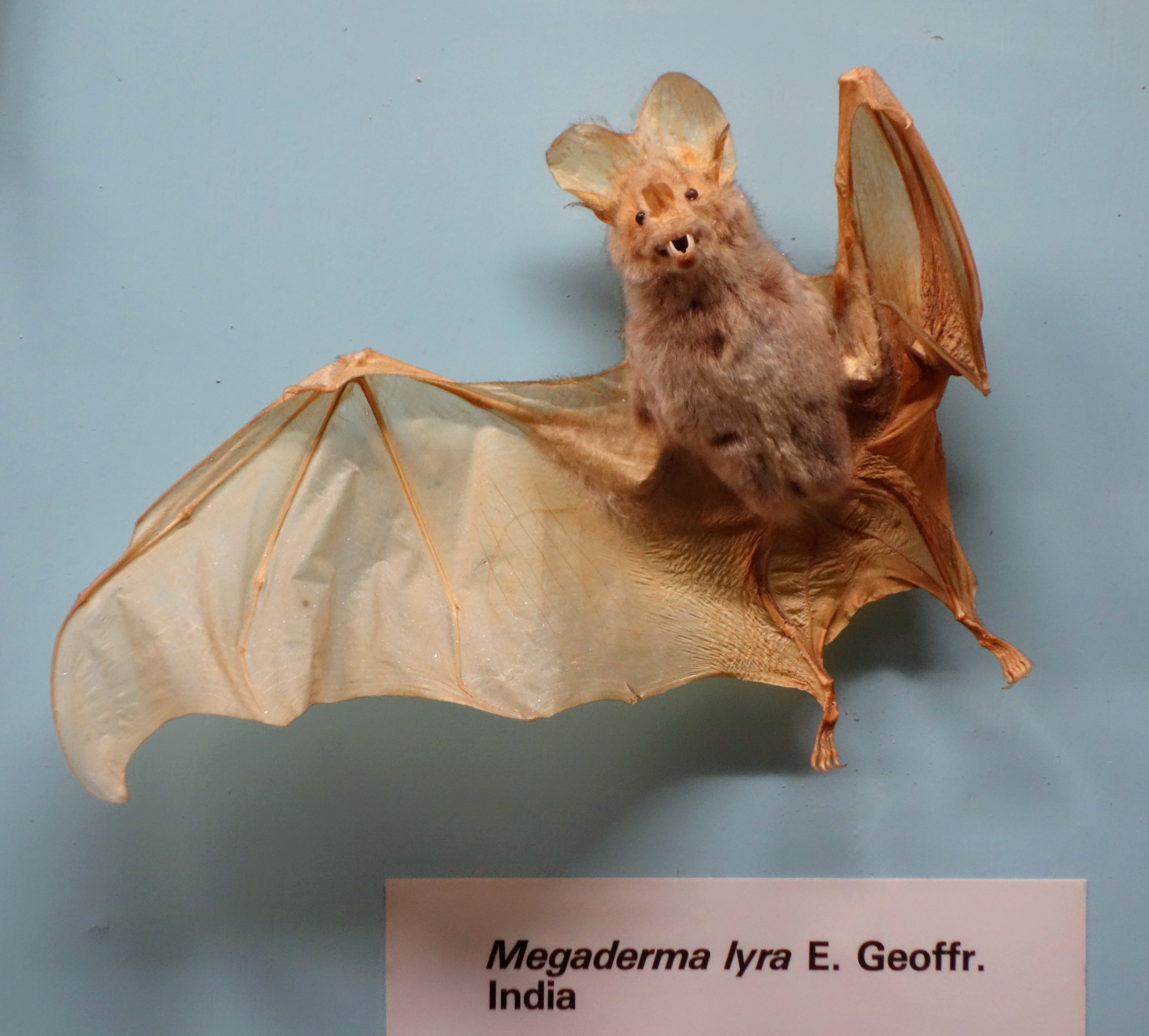

===== Species: Megaderma spasma (lesser false vampire bat / ചെറിയ നരിച്ചീർ) =====
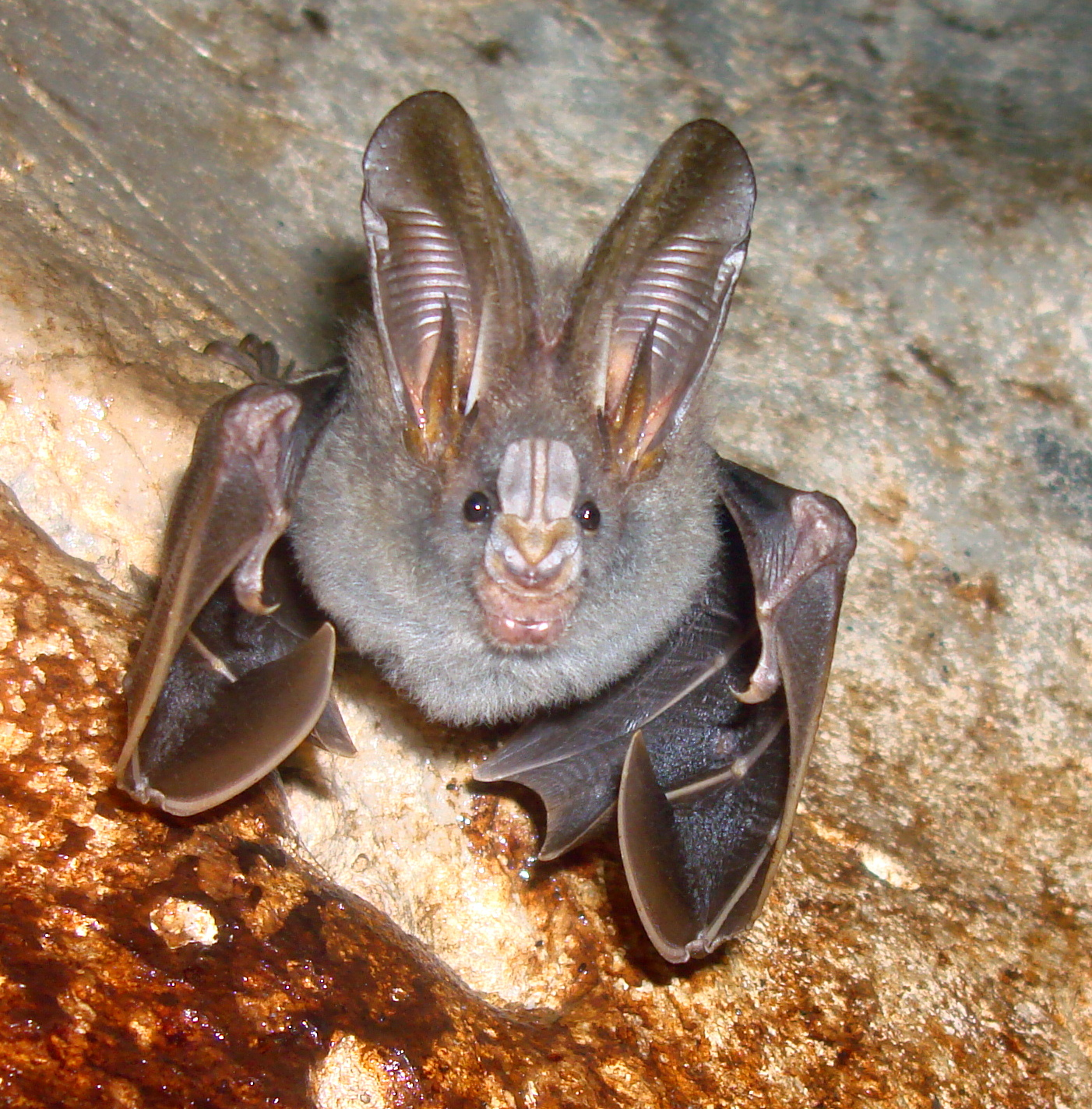

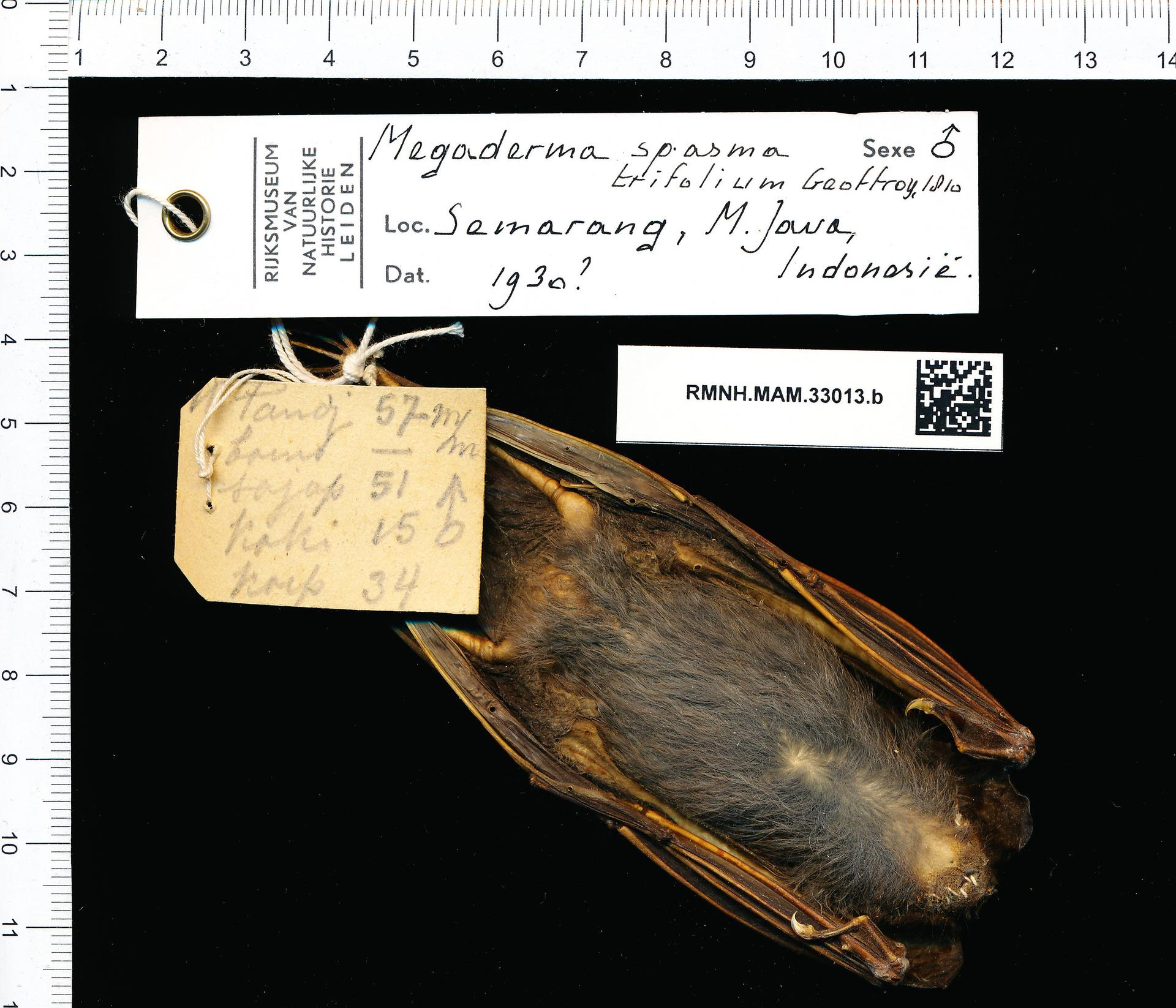

=== Family: Molossidae ===
==== Genus: Tadarida ====
===== Species: Tadarida aegyptiaca (Egyptian free-tailed bat) =====
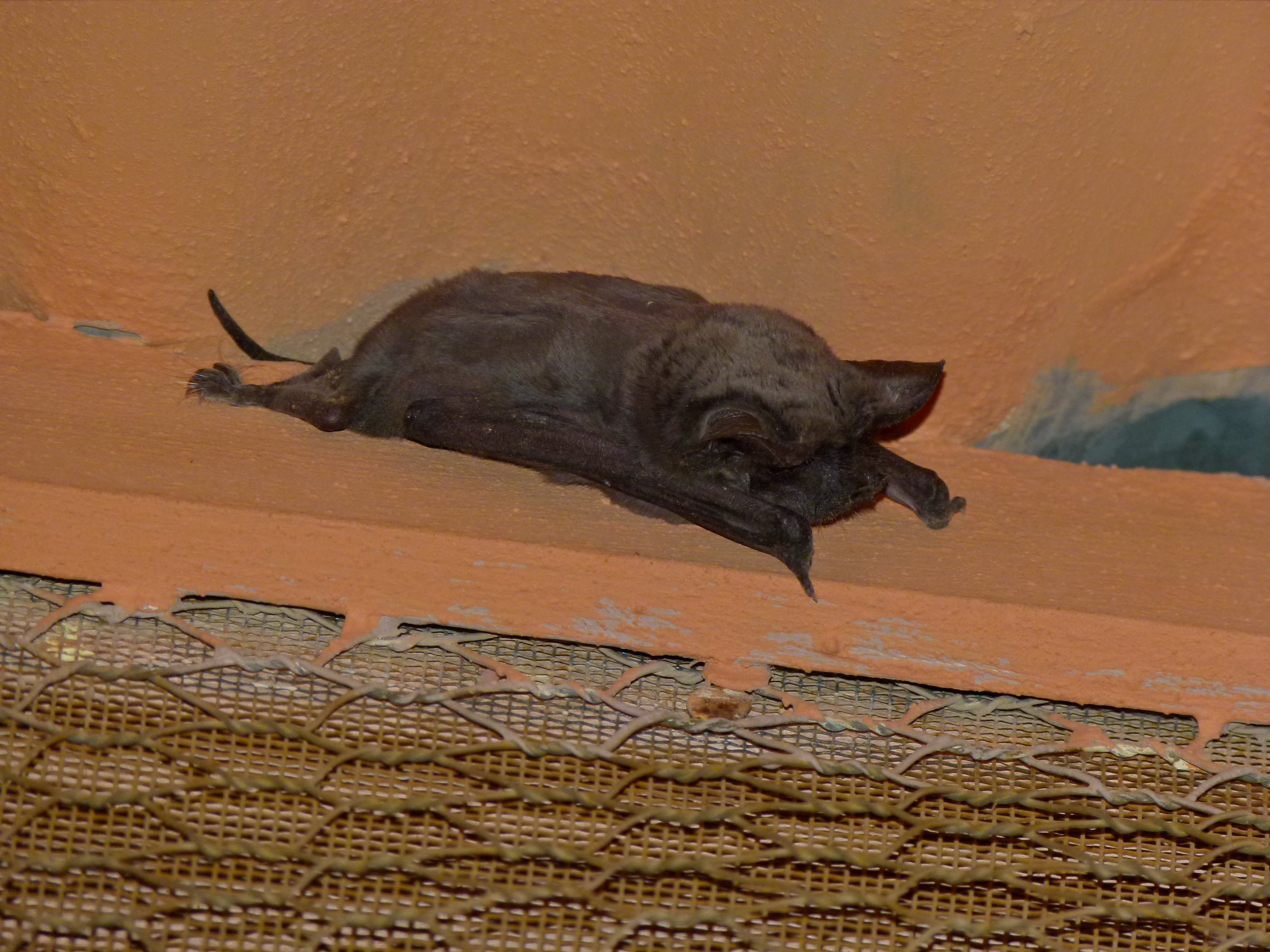

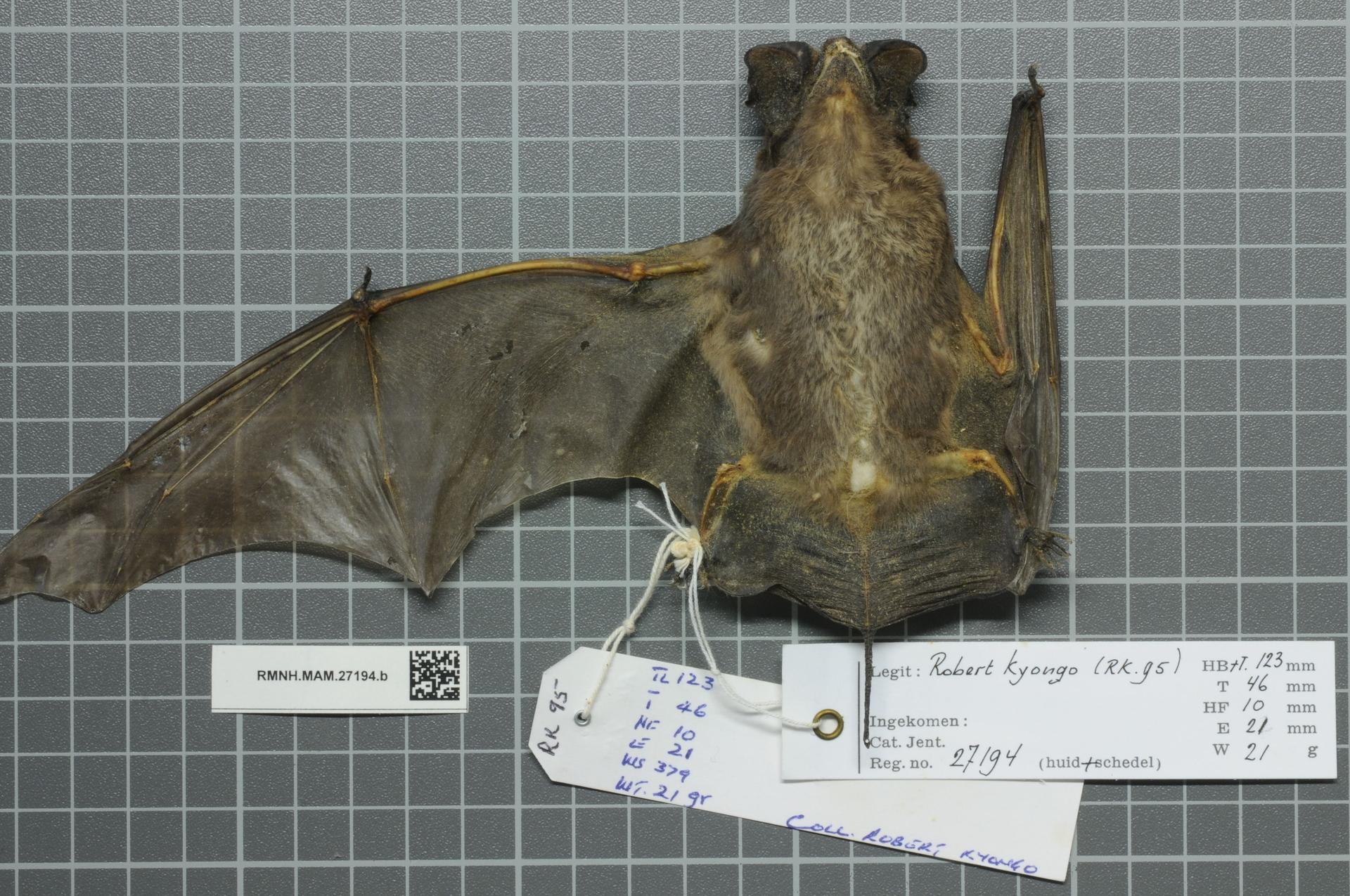

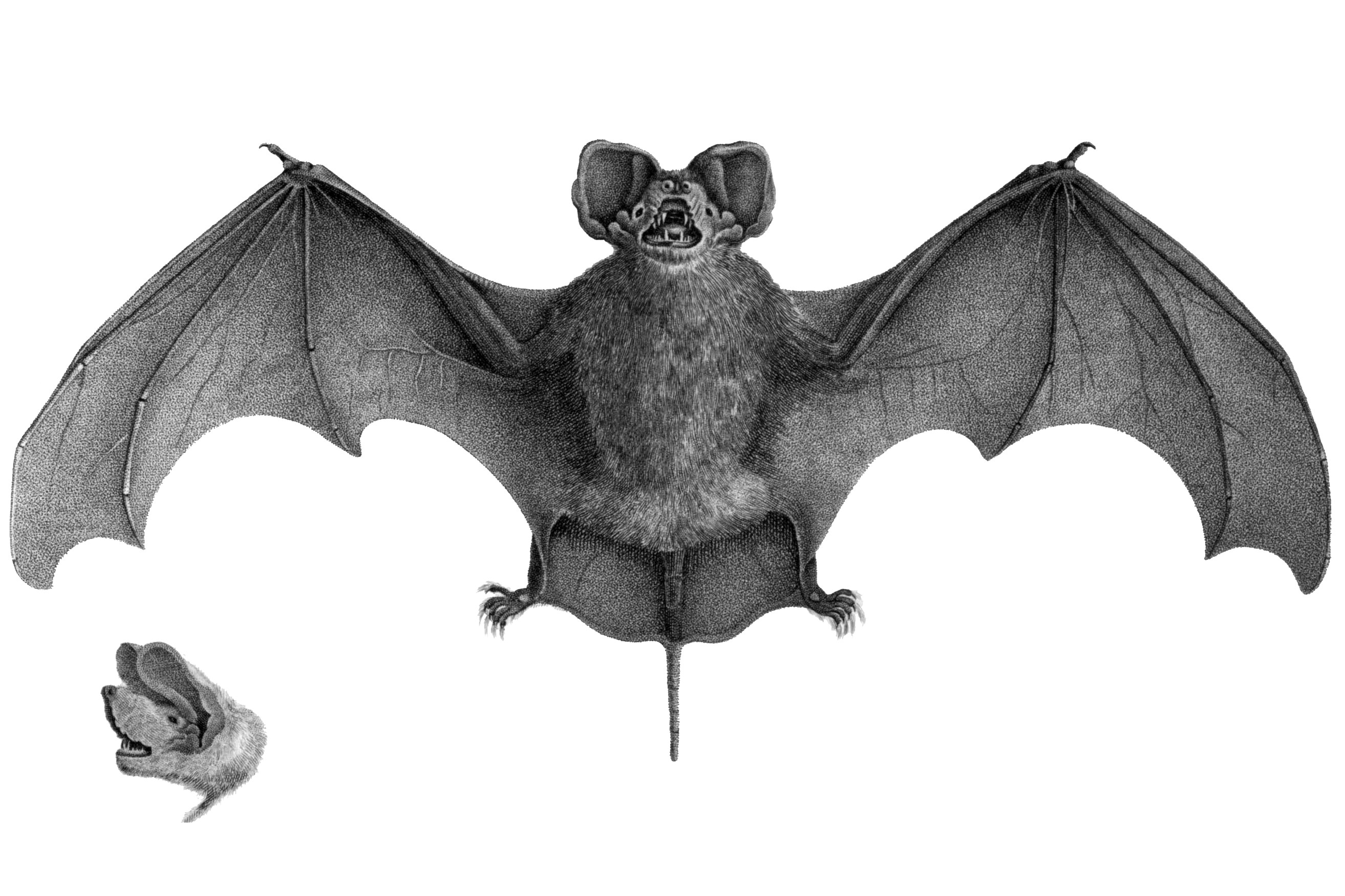

=== Family: Pteropodidae ===
==== Genus: Cynopterus ====
===== Species: Cynopterus brachyotis (lesser short-nosed fruit bat / ശ്വാനമുഖൻ വവ്വാൽ) =====
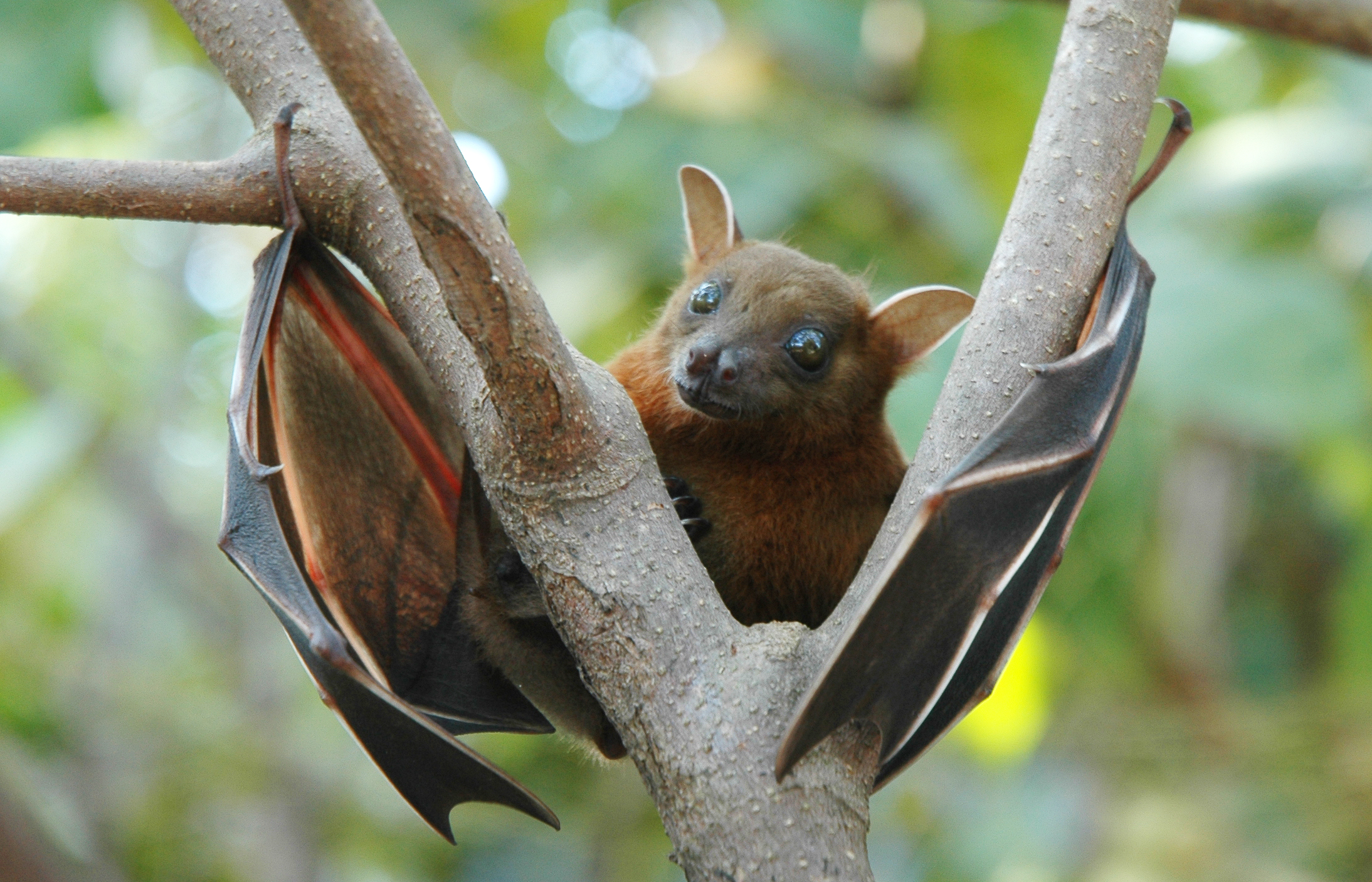

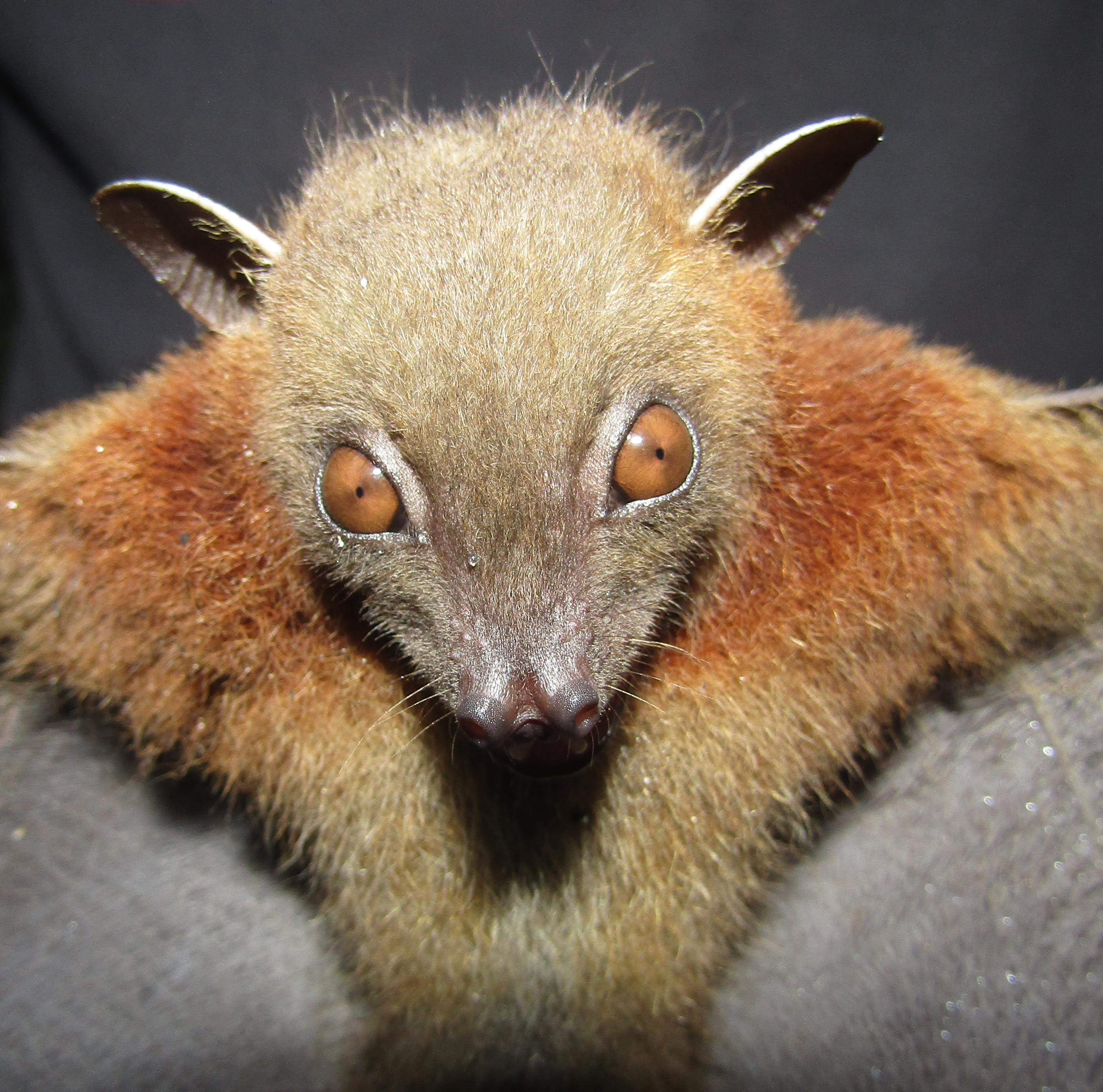

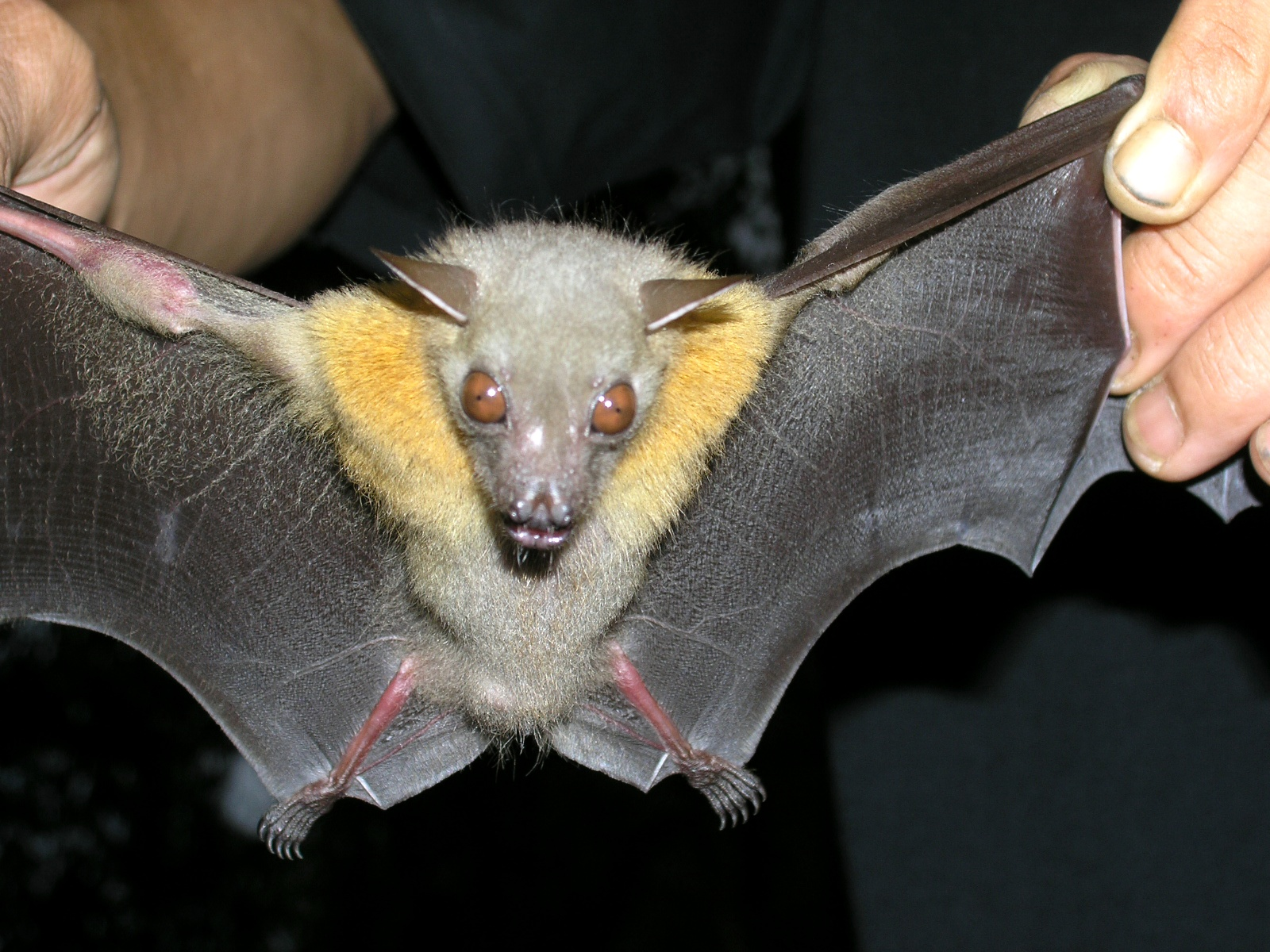

===== Species: Cynopterus sphinx (greater short-nosed fruit bat / കുറുമൂക്കൻ വവ്വാൽ) =====
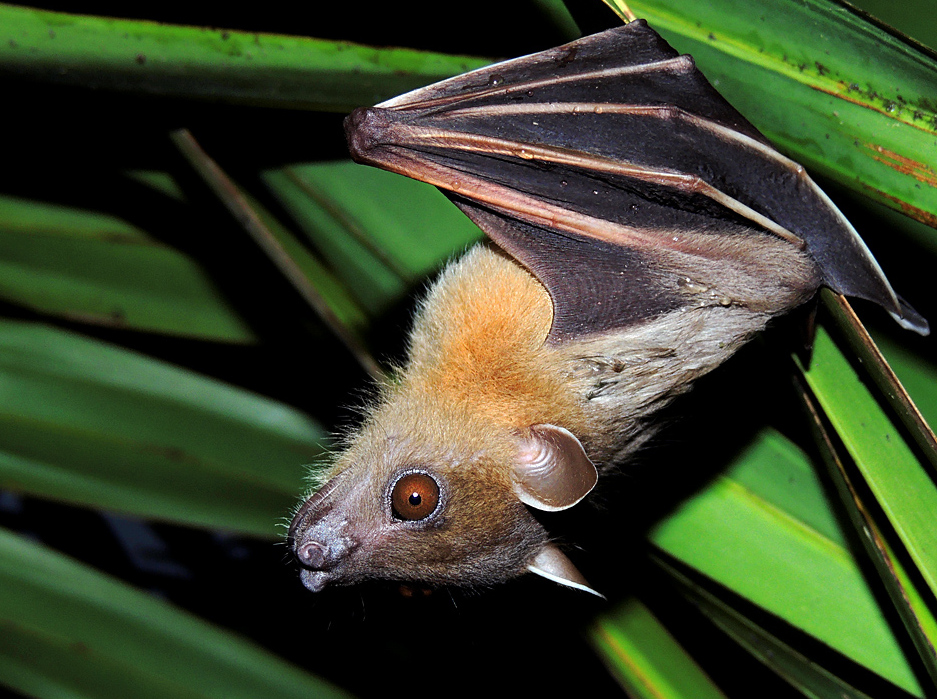

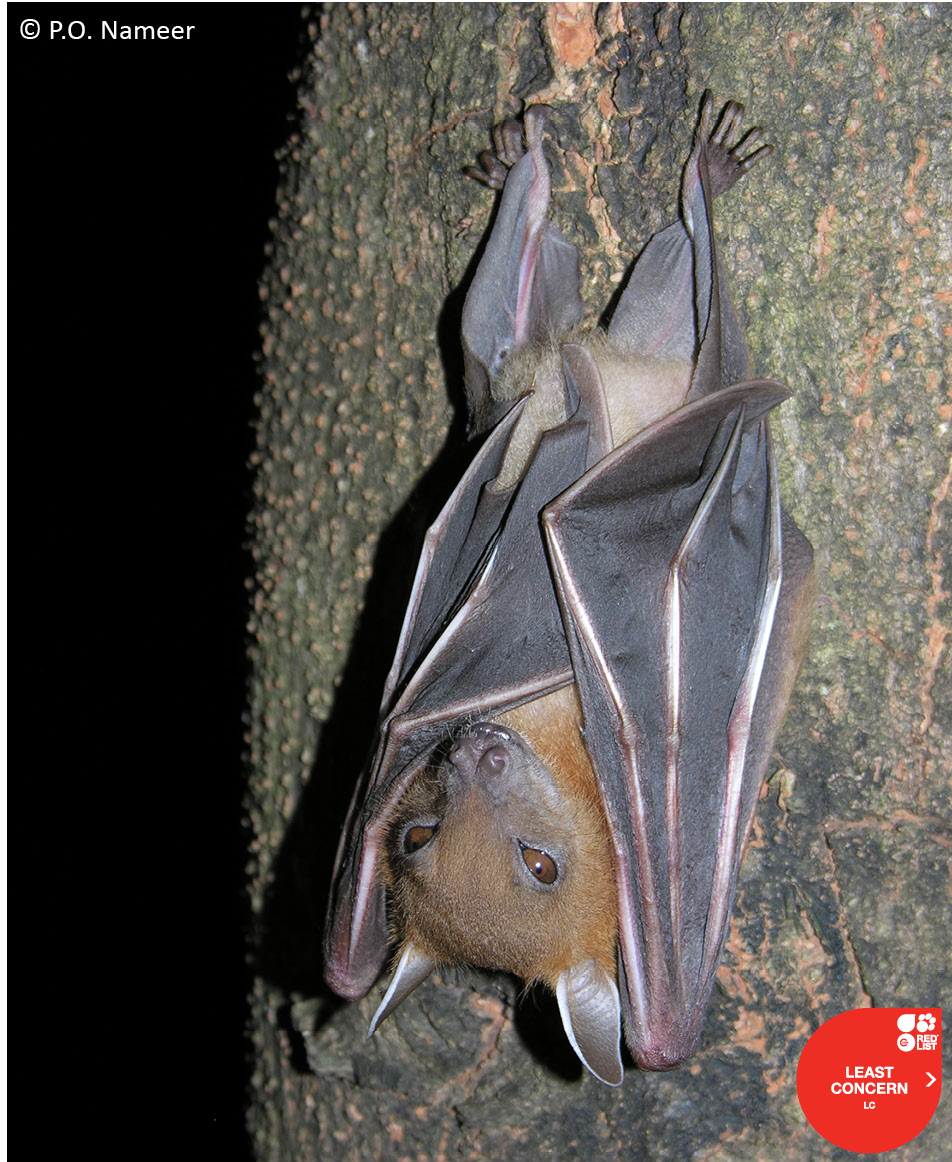

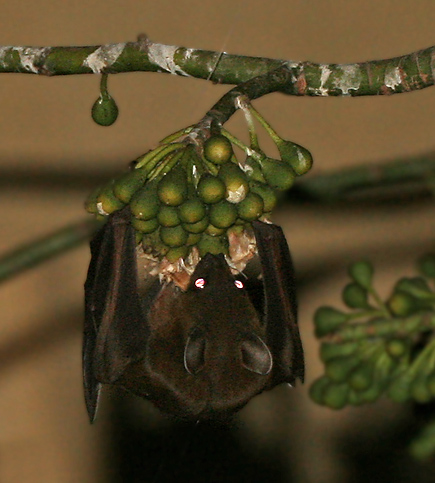

==== Genus: Eonycteris ====
===== Species: Eonycteris spelaea (cave nectar bat / പ്രഭാത വവ്വാൽ) =====
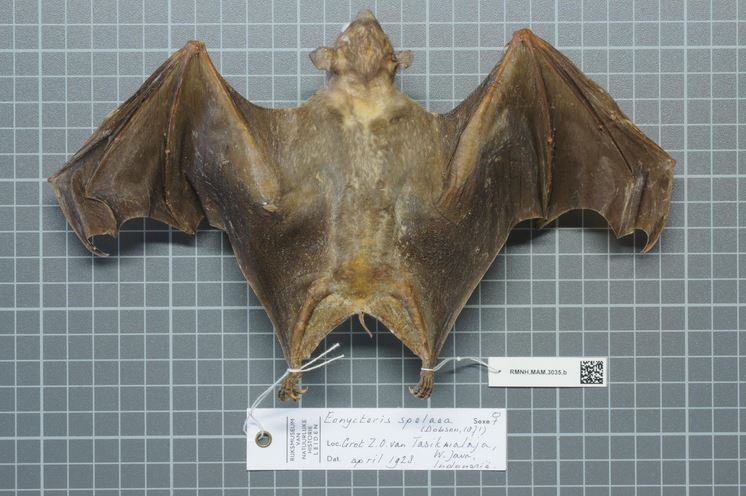

==== Genus: Pteropus ====
===== Species: Pteropus giganteus (Indian flying fox / ഇന്ത്യൻ പഴവവ്വാൽ) =====
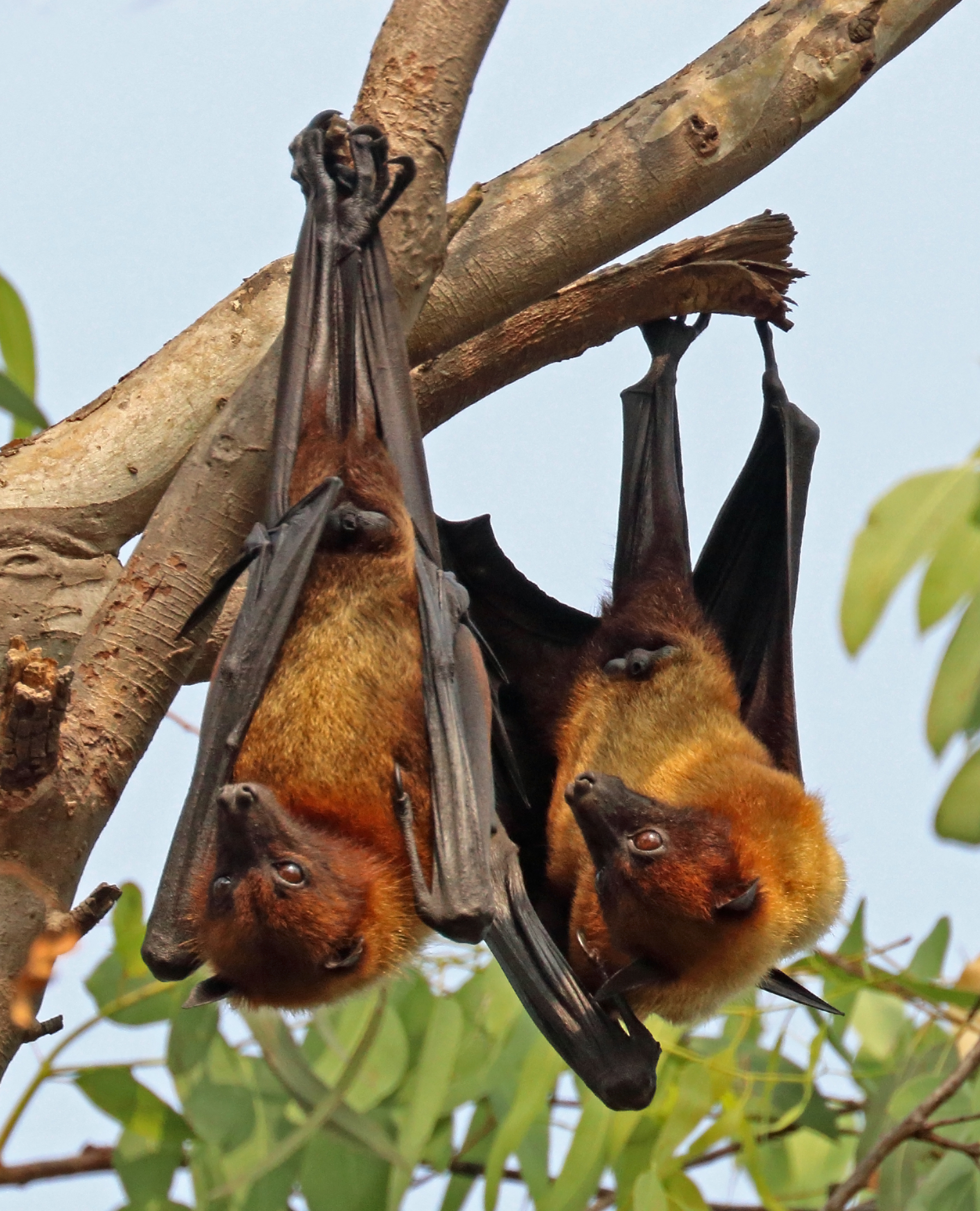

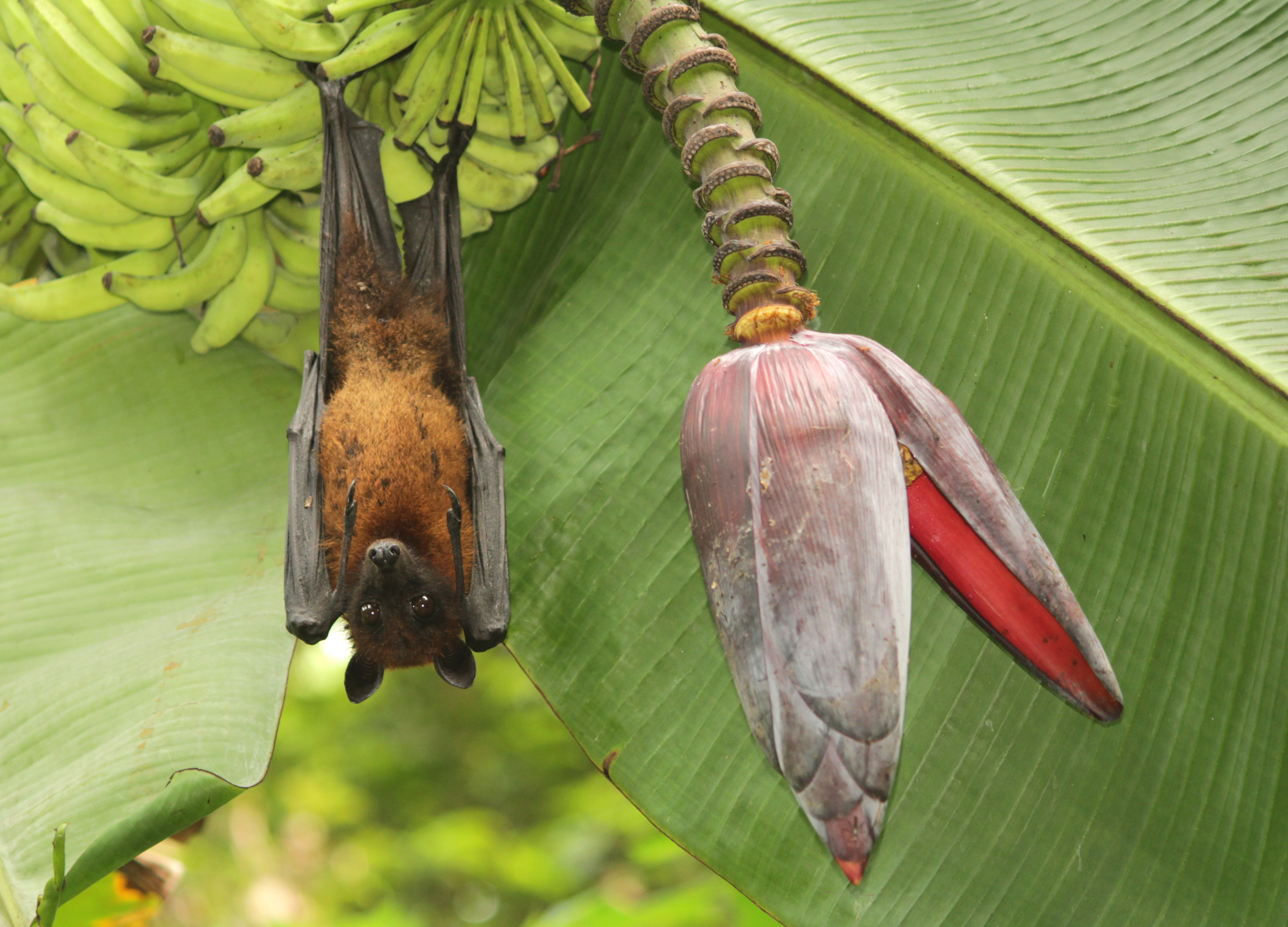

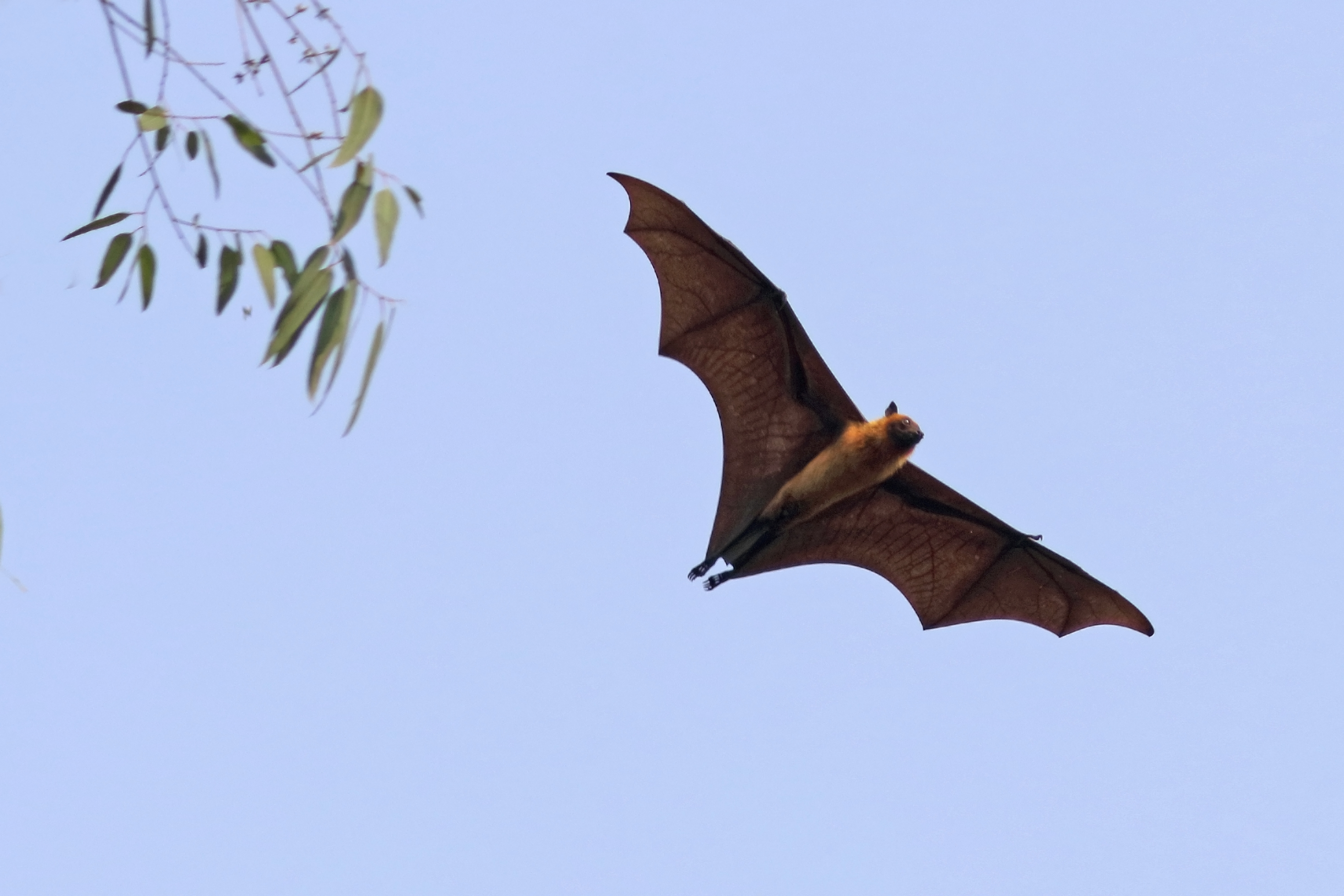

==== Genus: Rousettus ====
===== Species: Rousettus leschenaultii (Leschenault's rousette / മഞ്ഞച്ചുവപ്പൻ പഴവവ്വാൽ) =====
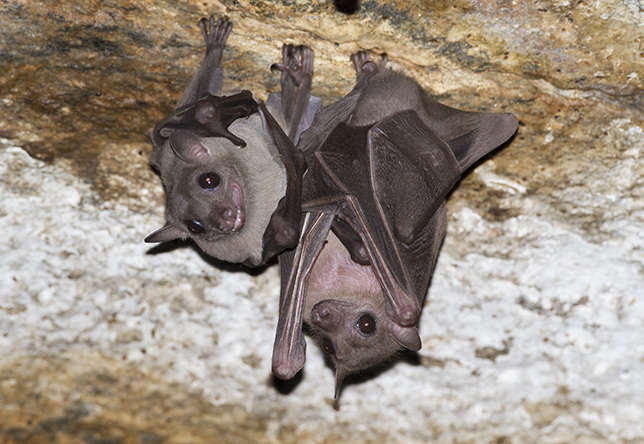

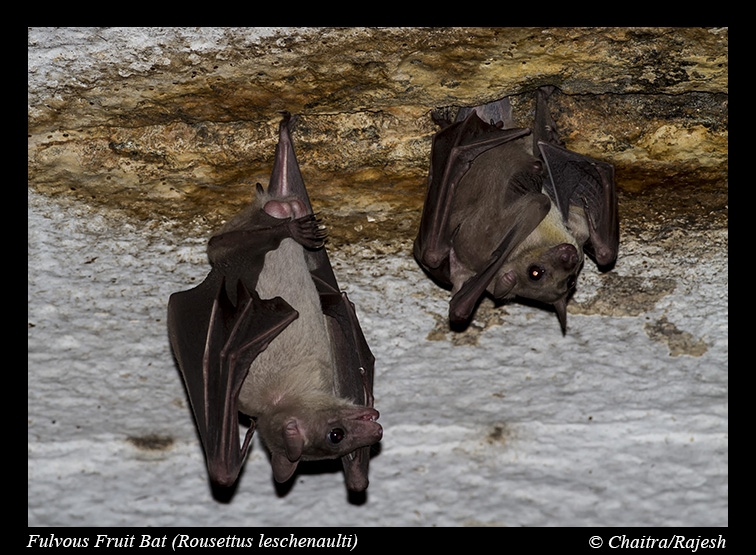

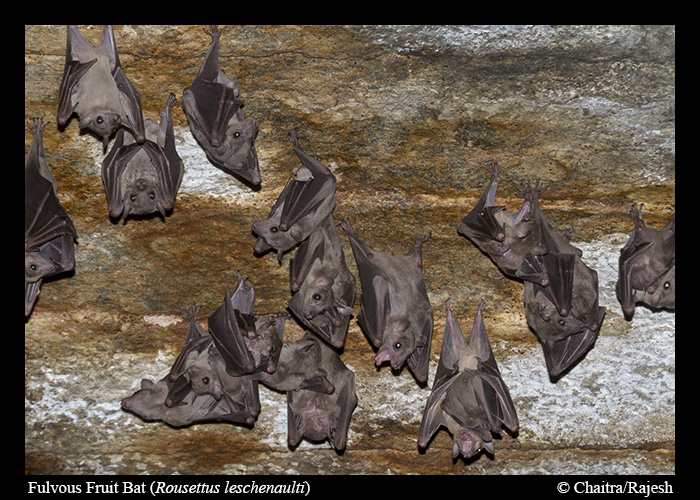

=== Family: Rhinolophidae ===
==== Genus: Rhinolophus ====
===== Species: Rhinolophus beddomei (lesser woolly horseshoe bat) =====
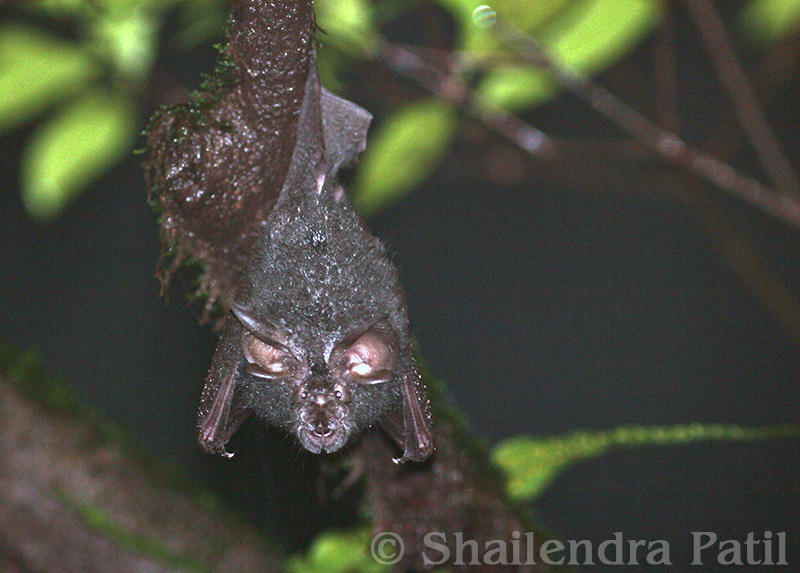

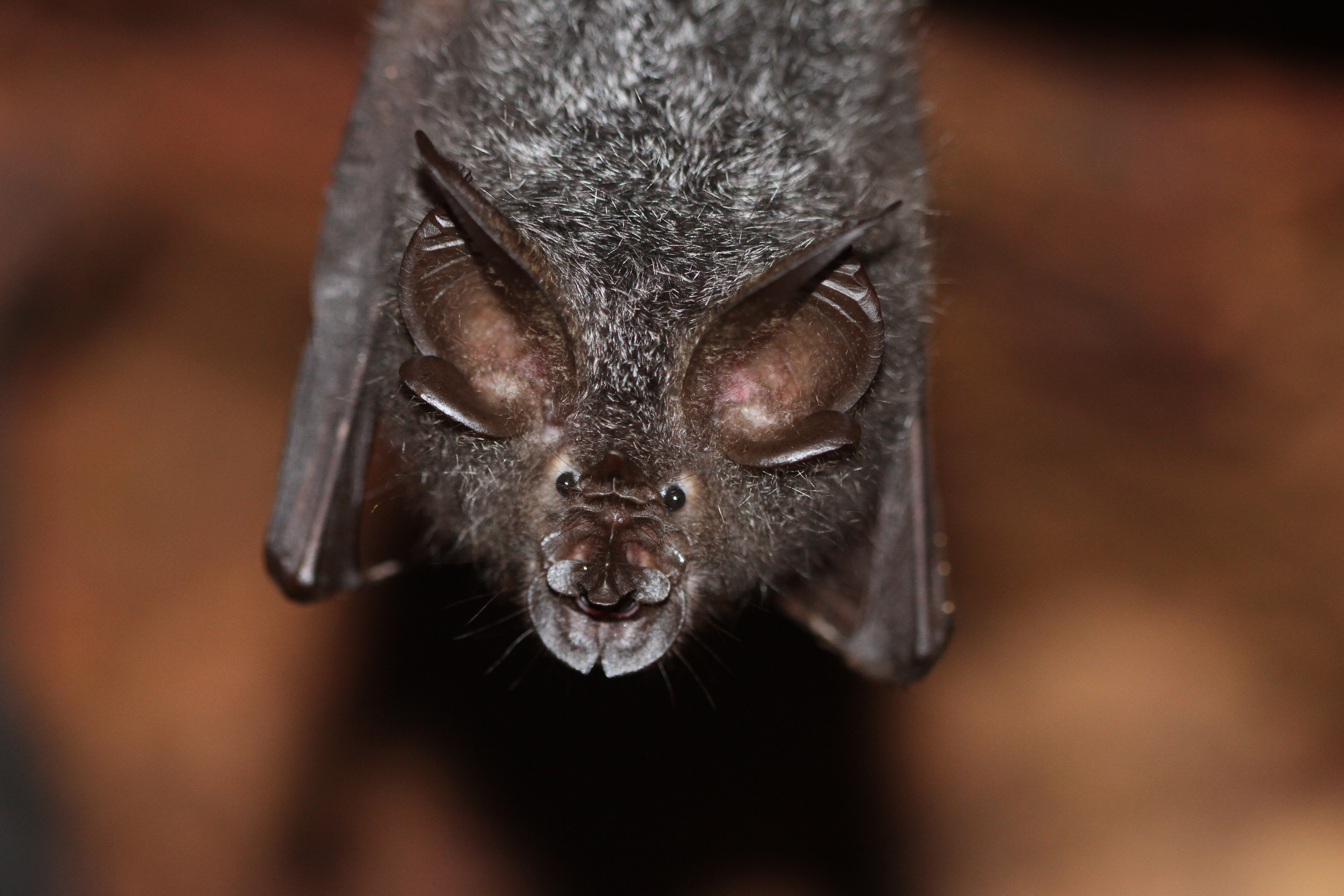

===== Species: Rhinolophus lepidus (Blyth's horseshoe bat) =====
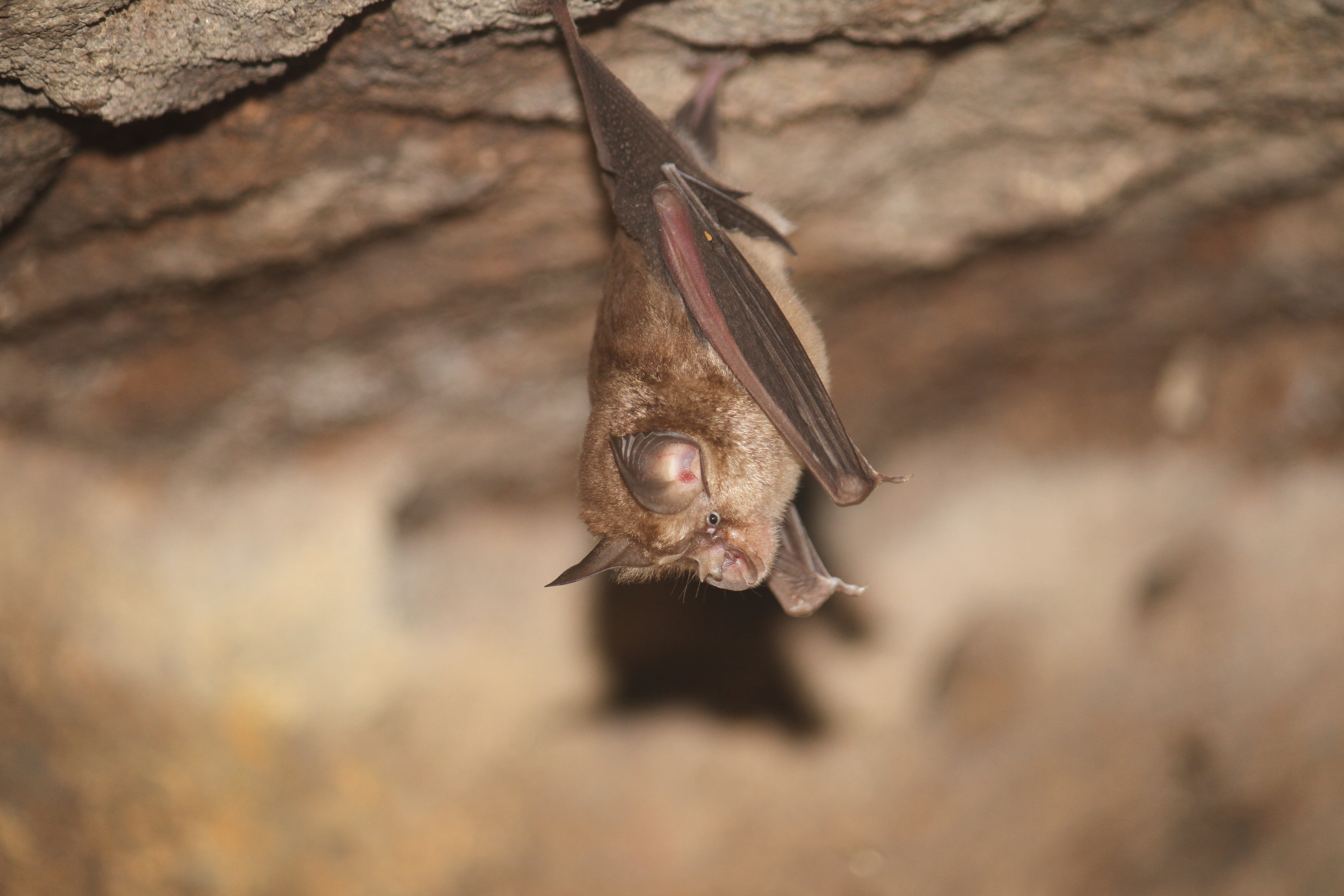

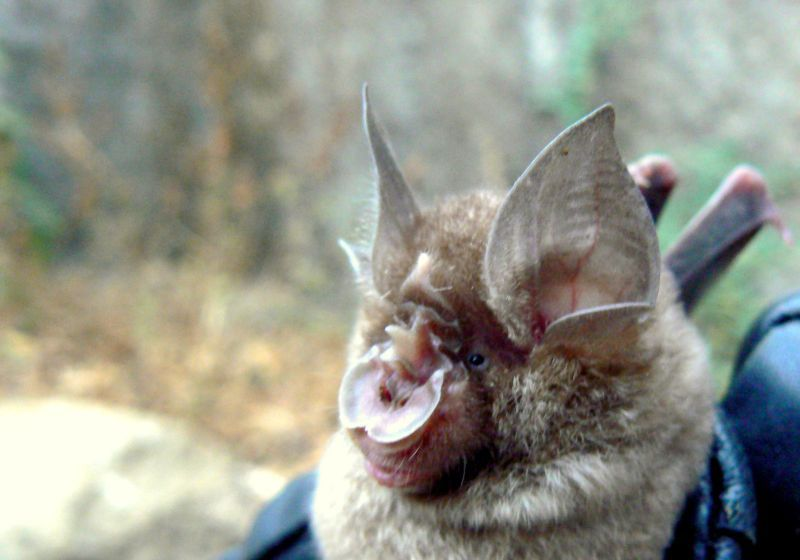

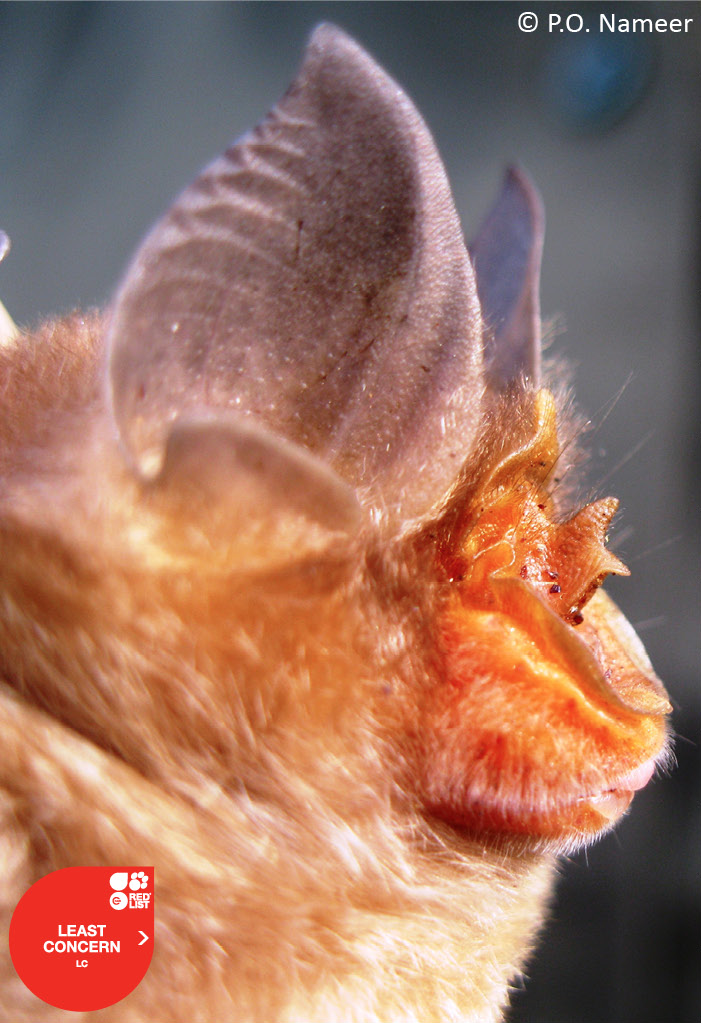

===== Species: Rhinolophus pusillus (least horseshoe bat) =====
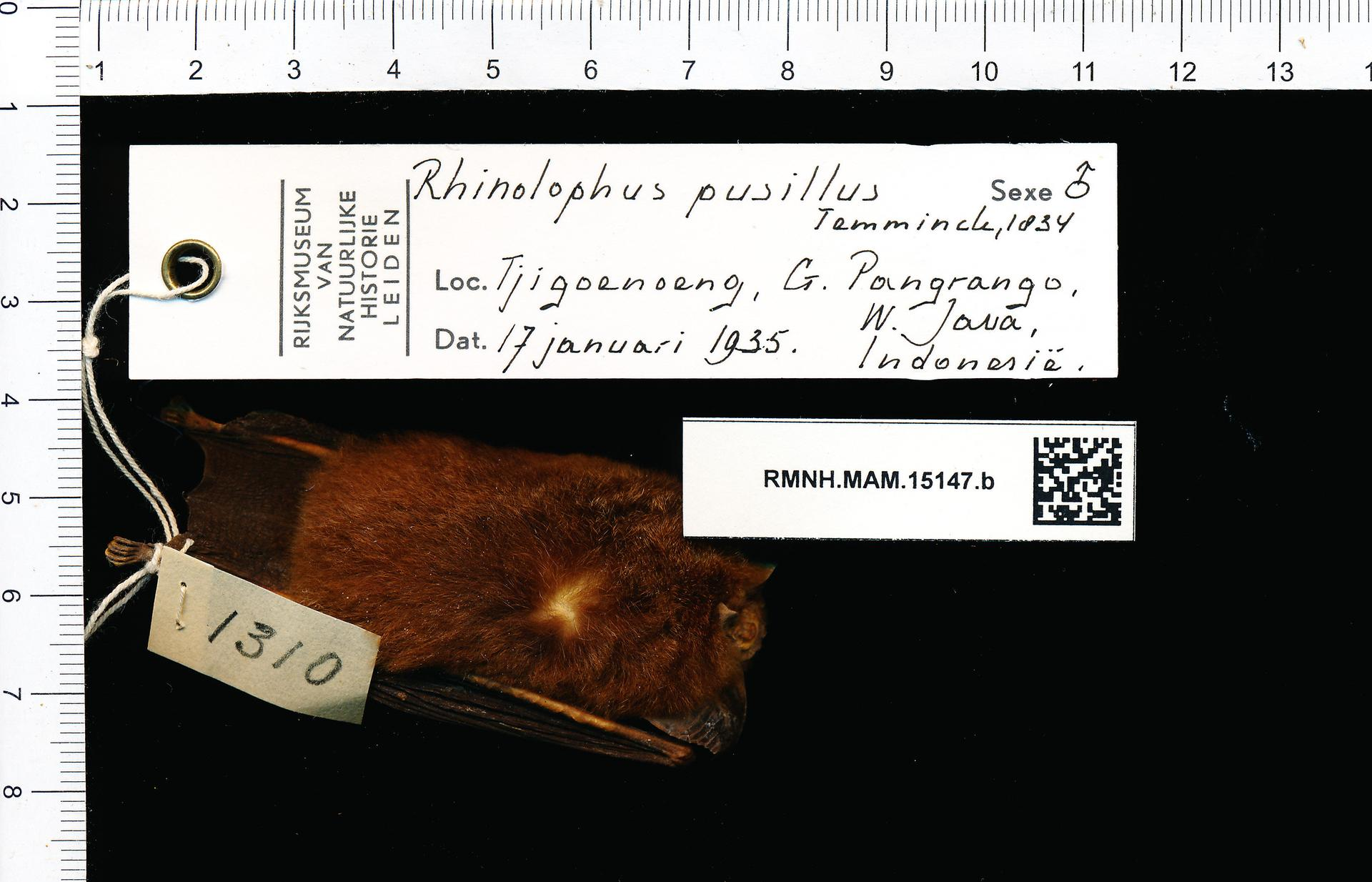

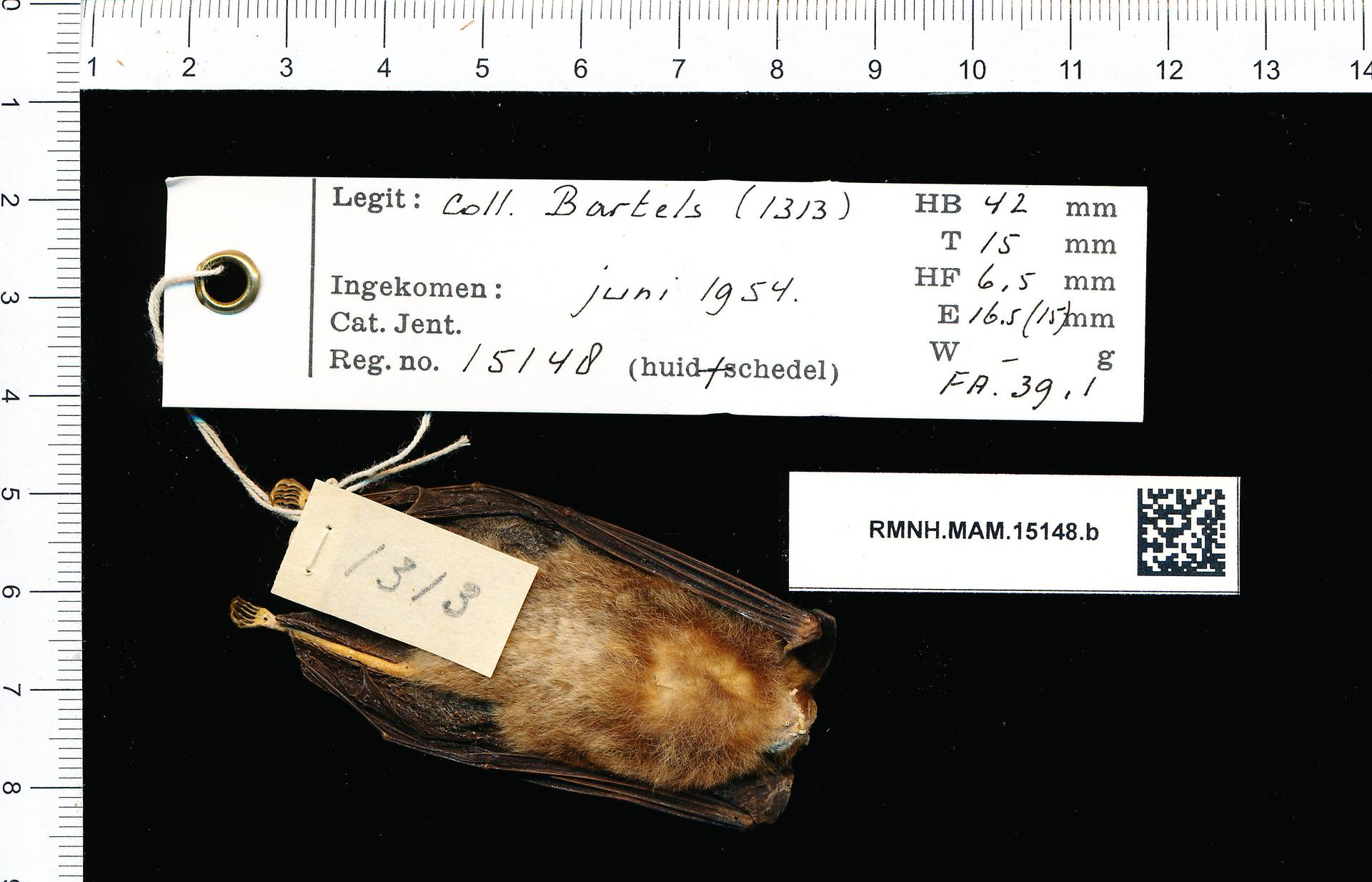

===== Species: Rhinolophus rouxii (rufous horseshoe bat) =====
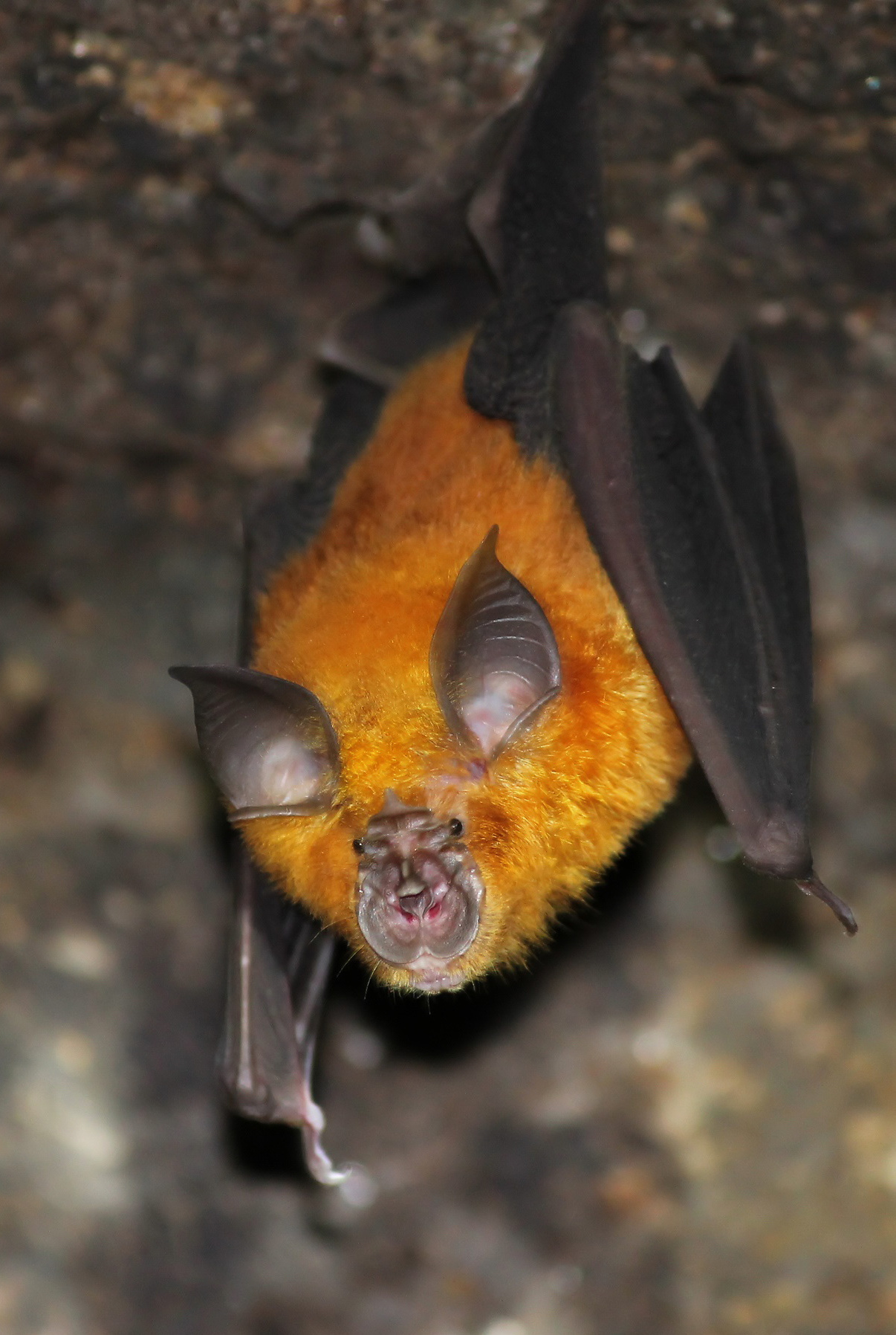

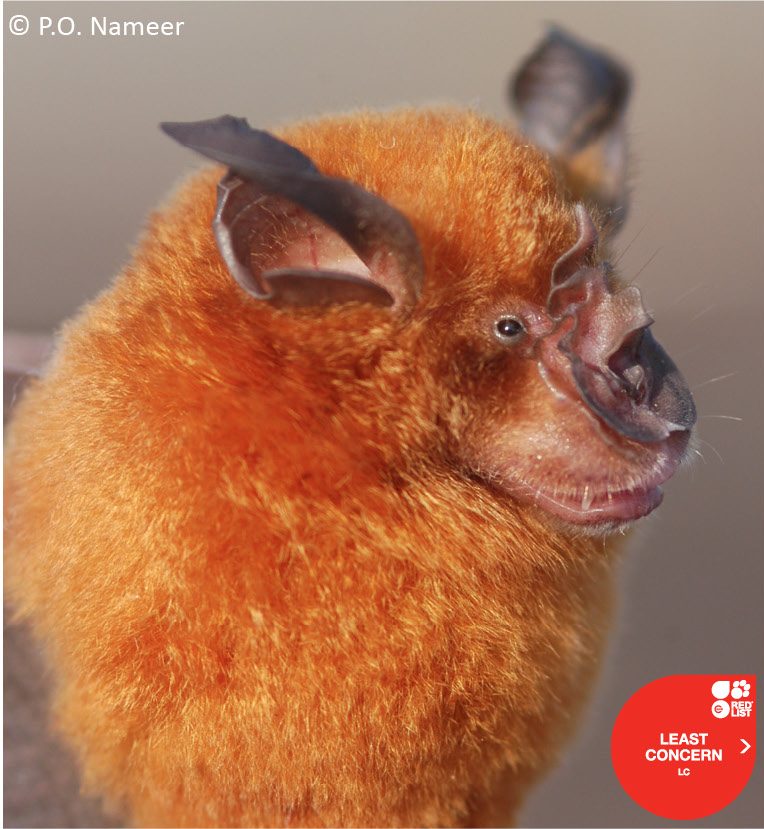

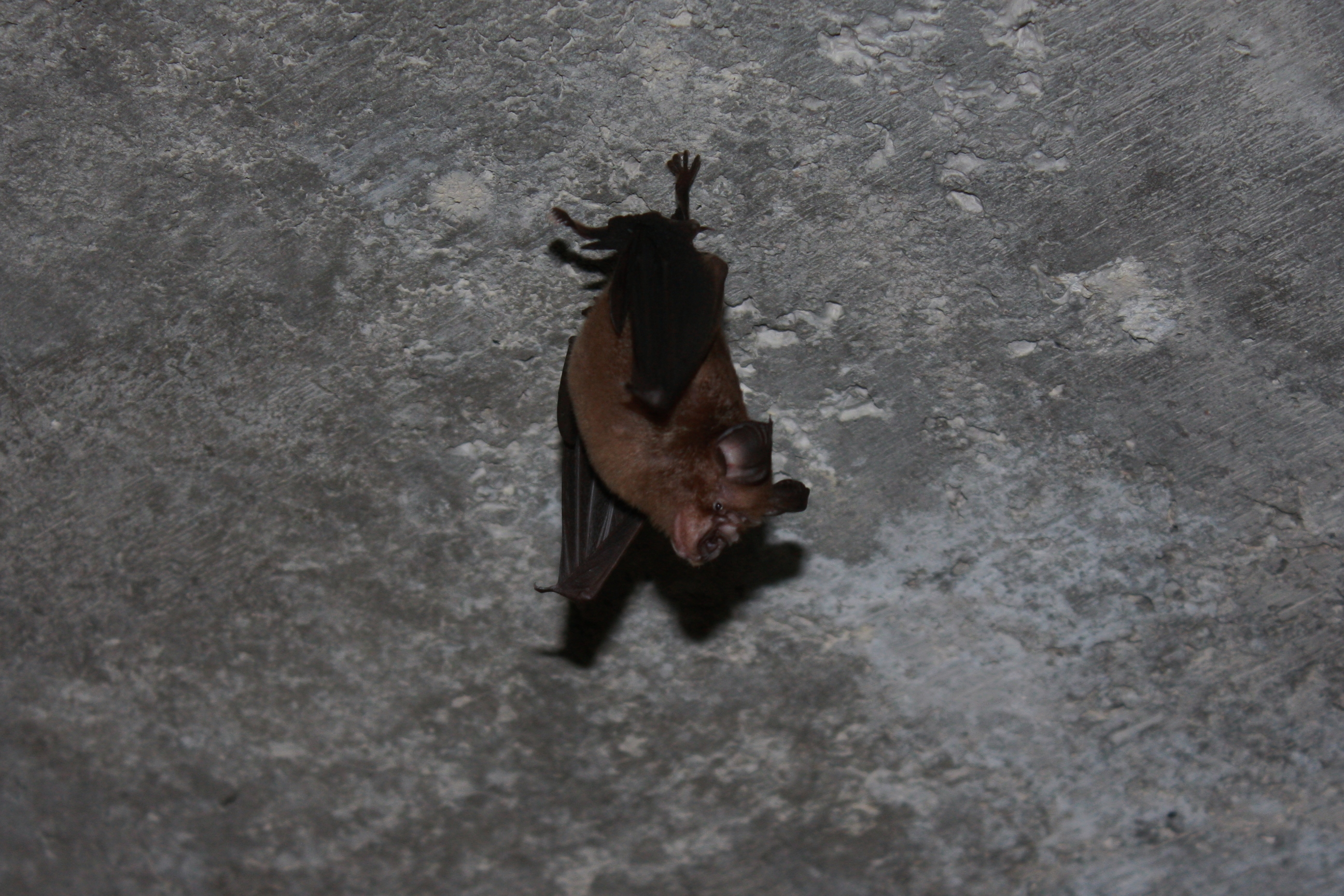

=== Family: Vespertilionidae ===
==== Genus: Kerivoula ====
===== Species: Kerivoula picta (painted bat / ചിത്രവാവ്വൽ) =====
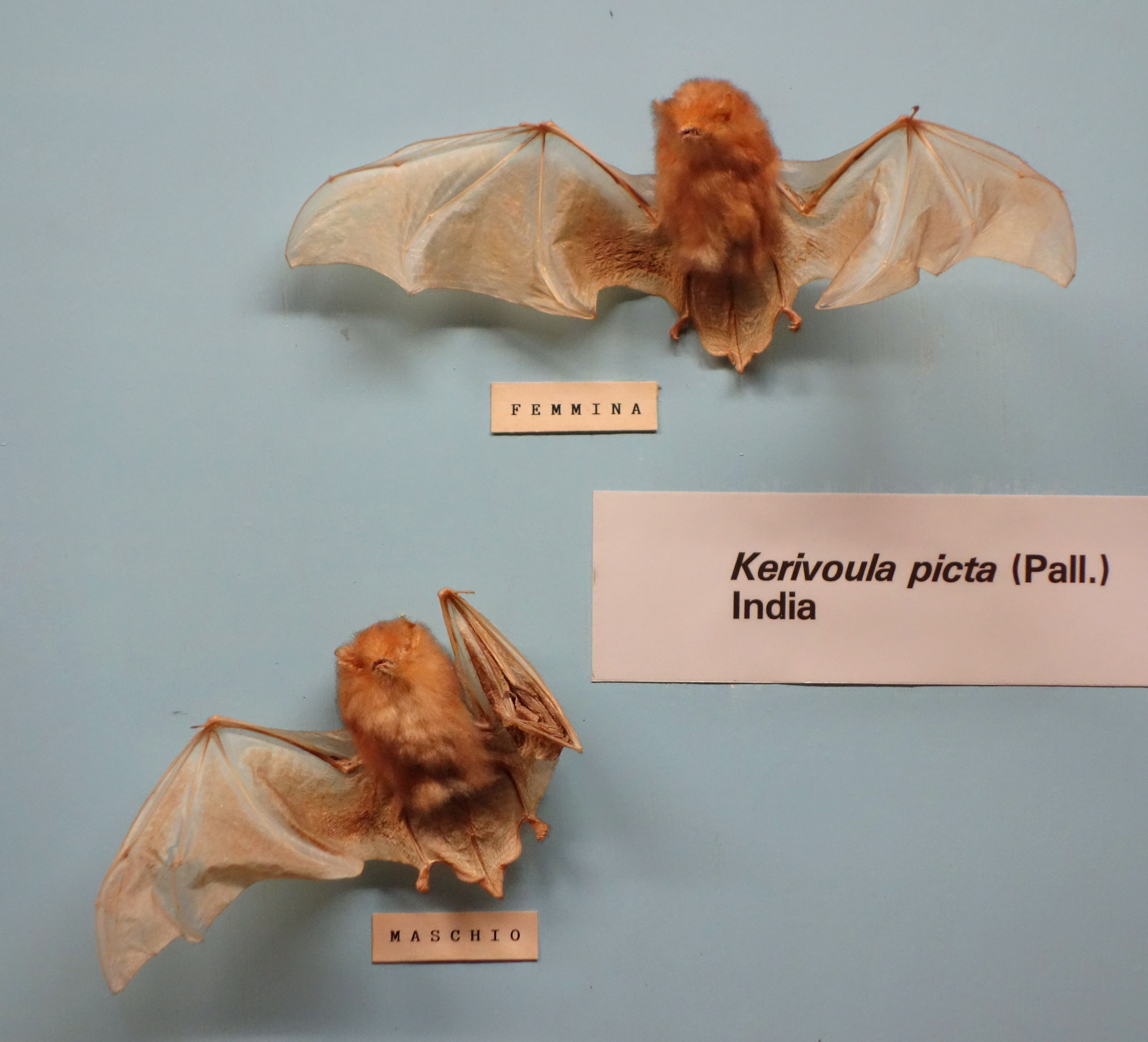

==== Genus: Myotis ====
===== Species: Myotis horsfieldii (Horsfield's bat) =====
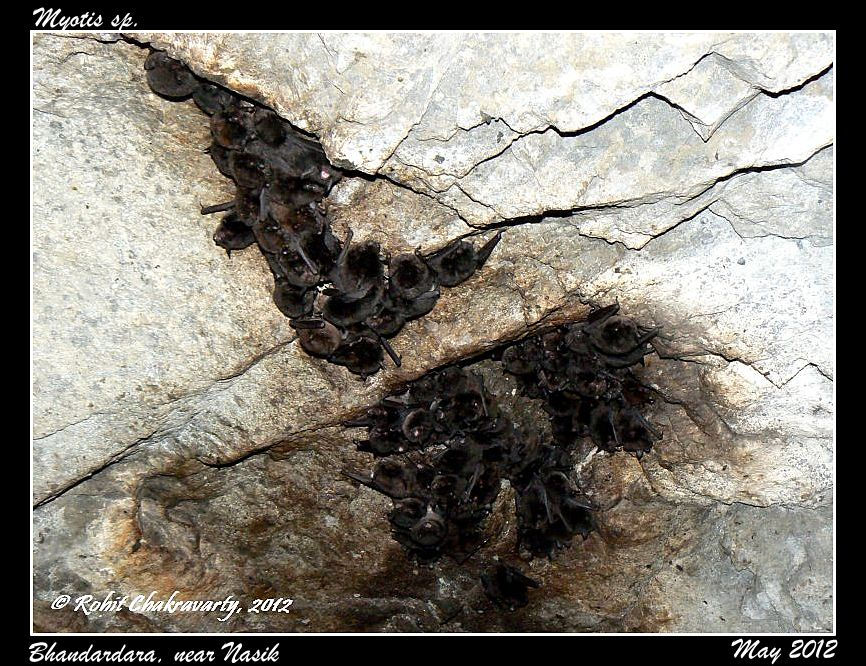

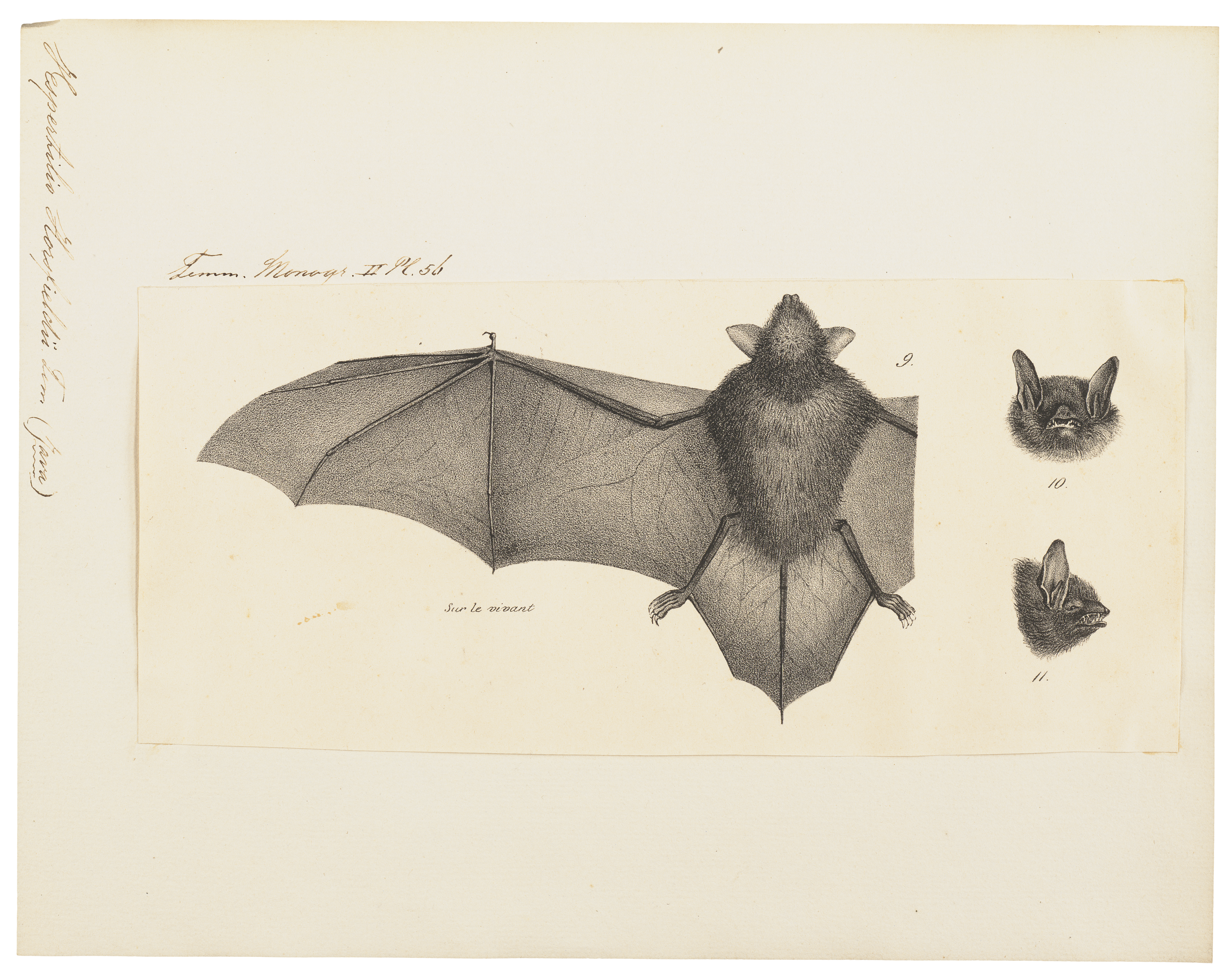

===== Species: Myotis montivagus (Burmese whiskered bat) =====
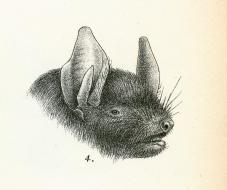

==== Genus: Pipistrellus ====
===== Species: Pipistrellus tenuis (least pipistrelle / കുഞ്ഞൻ അടക്കവാവൽ) =====
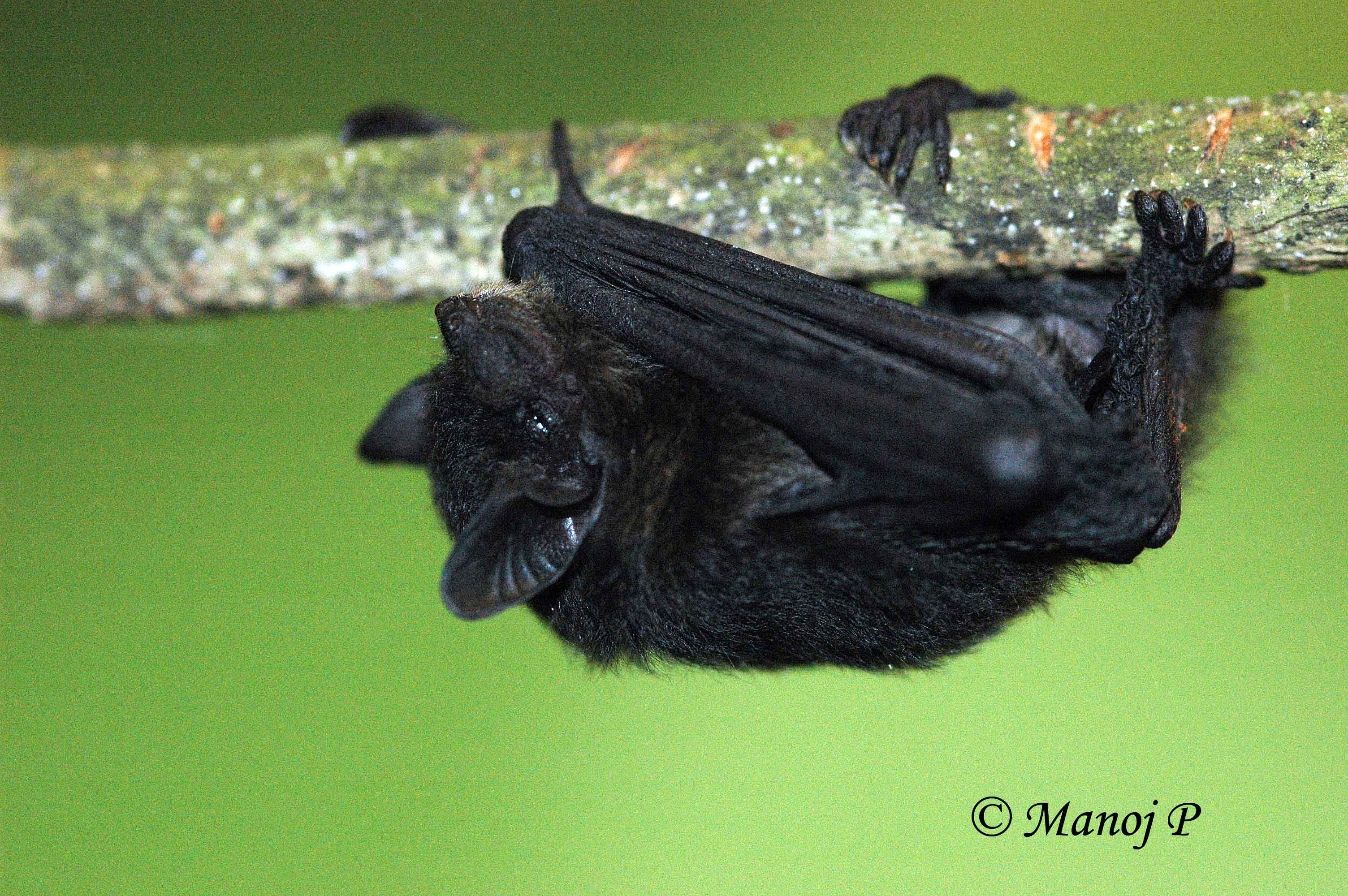

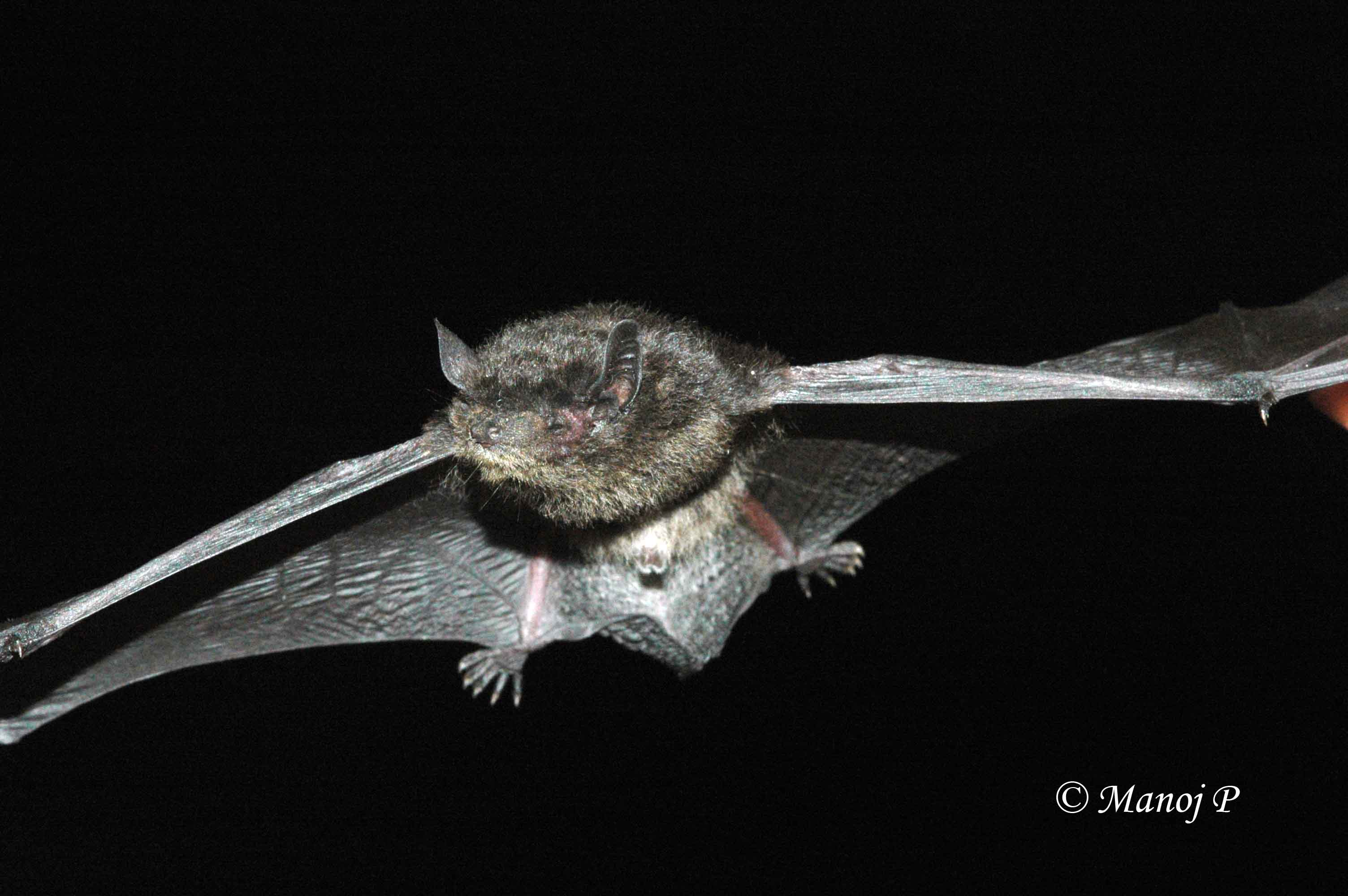

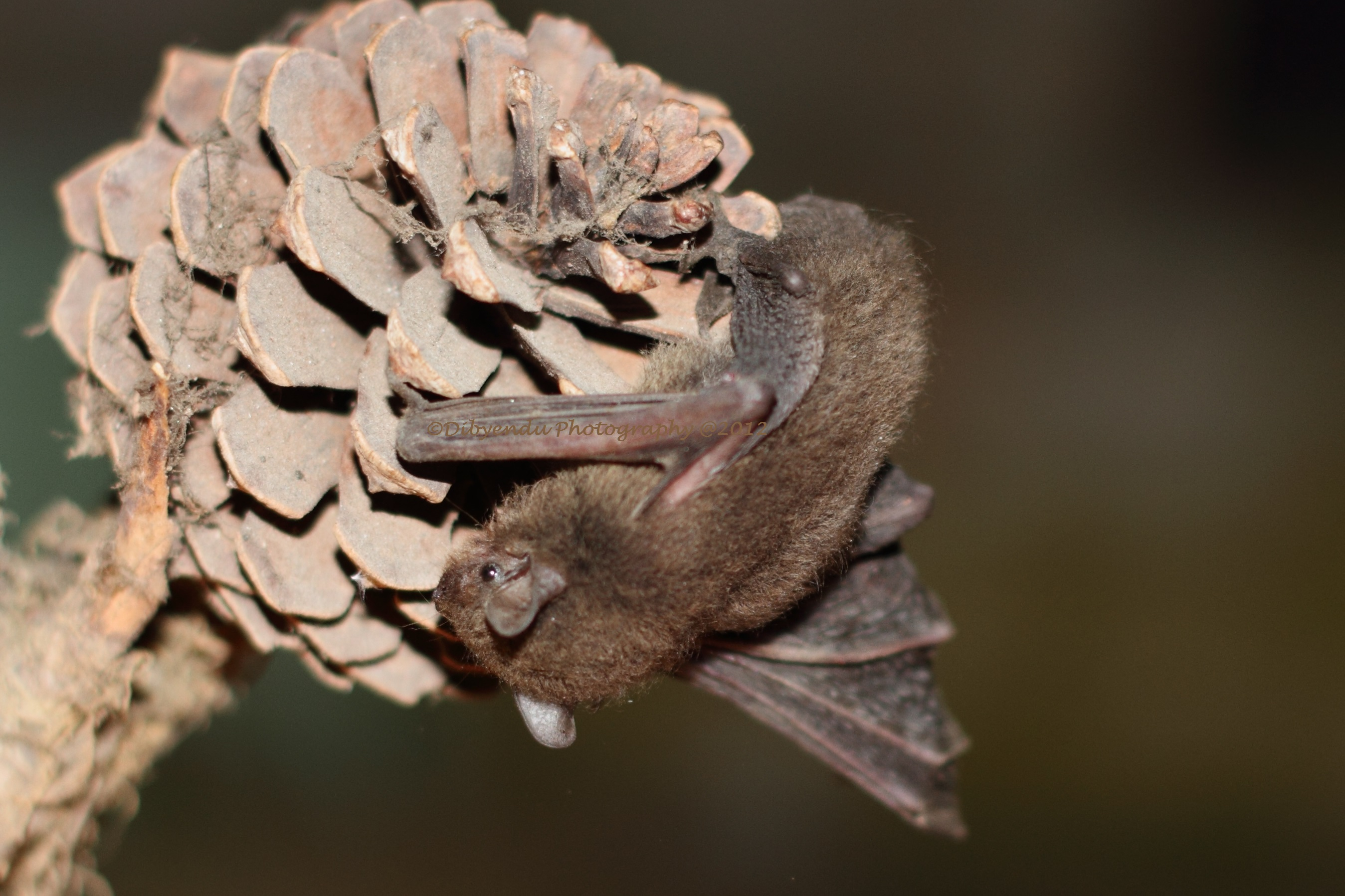

==== Genus: Scotophilus ====
===== Species: Scotophilus heathii (greater Asiatic yellow bat) =====
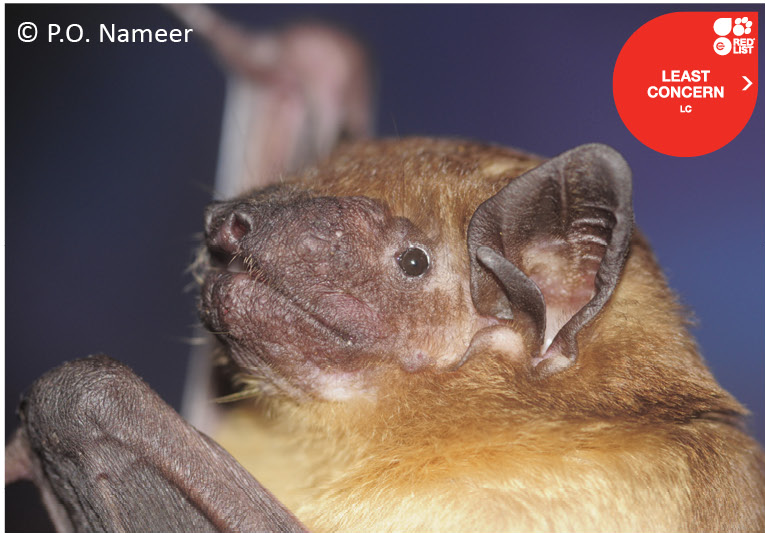

===== Species: Scotophilus kuhlii (lesser Asiatic yellow bat) =====
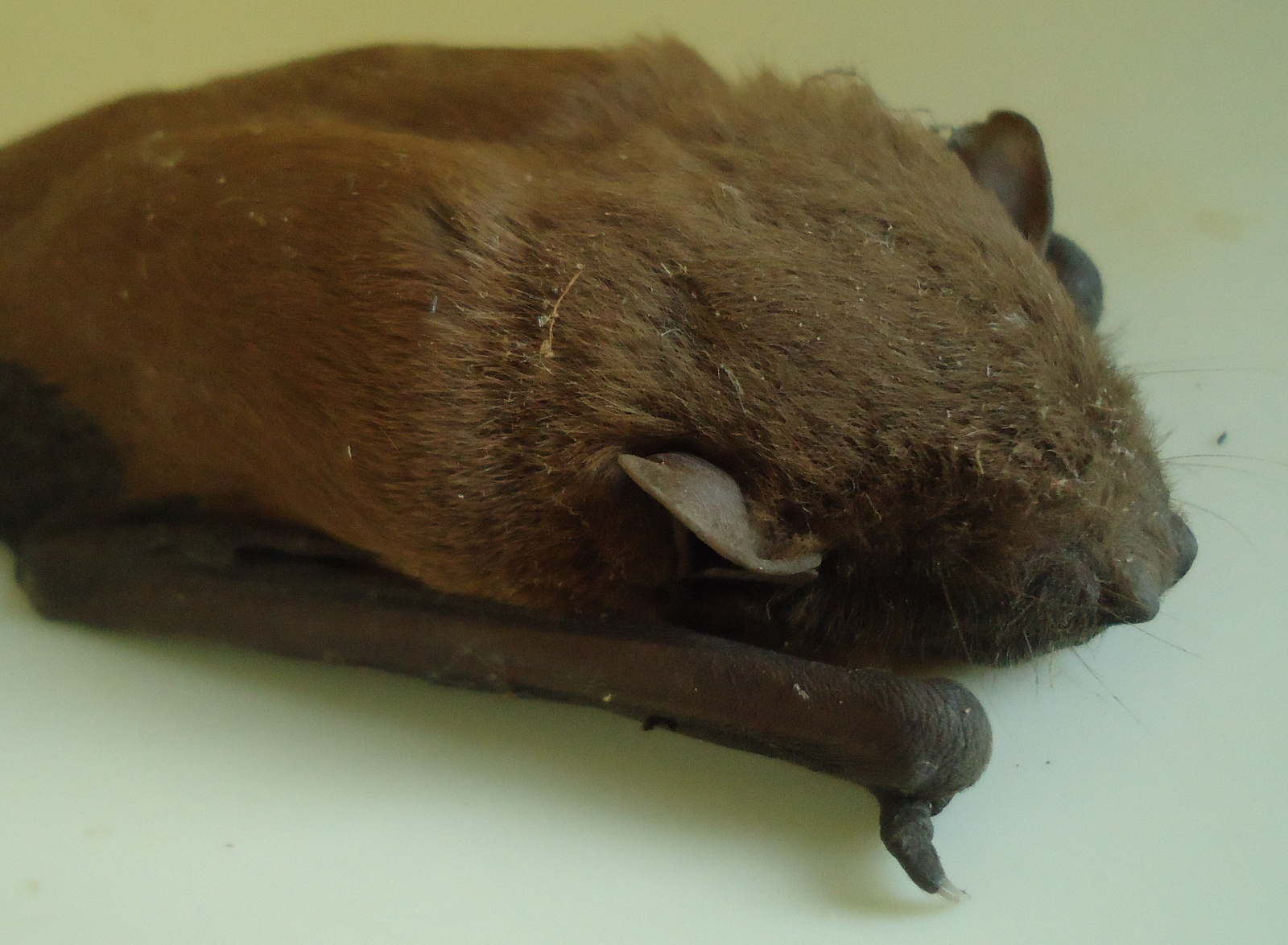

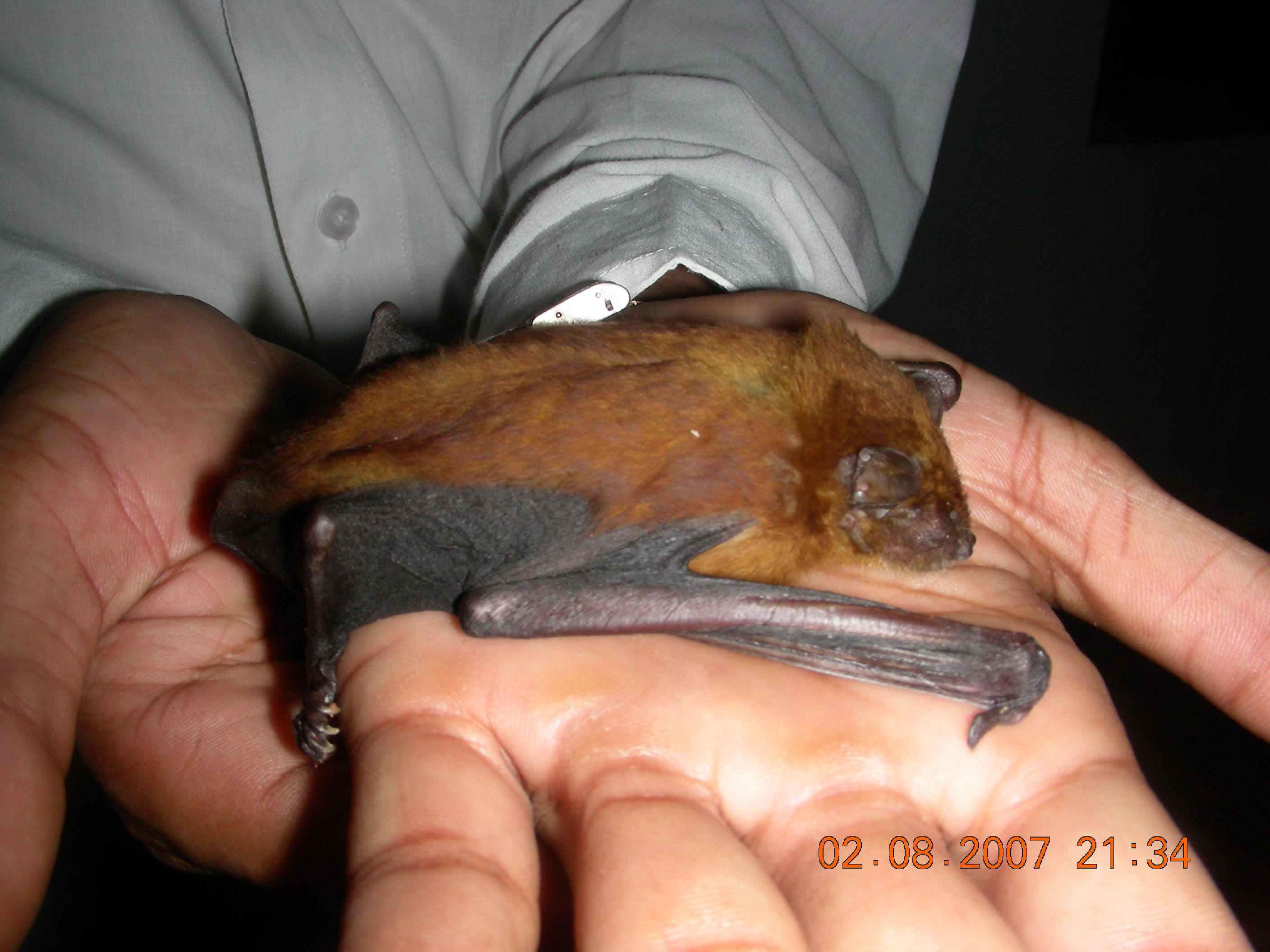

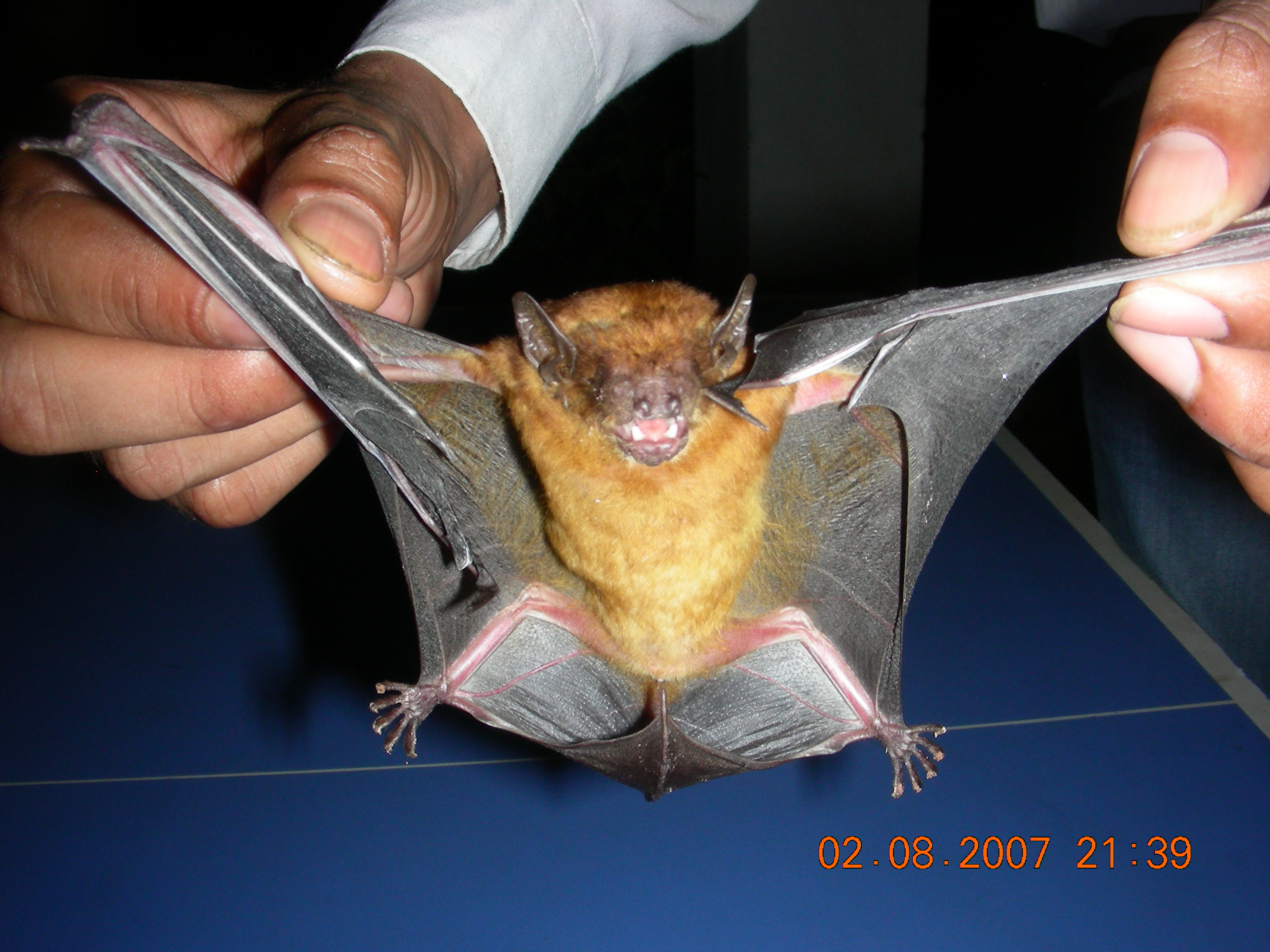

==== Genus: Tylonycteris ====
===== Species: Tylonycteris pachypus (lesser bamboo bat) =====
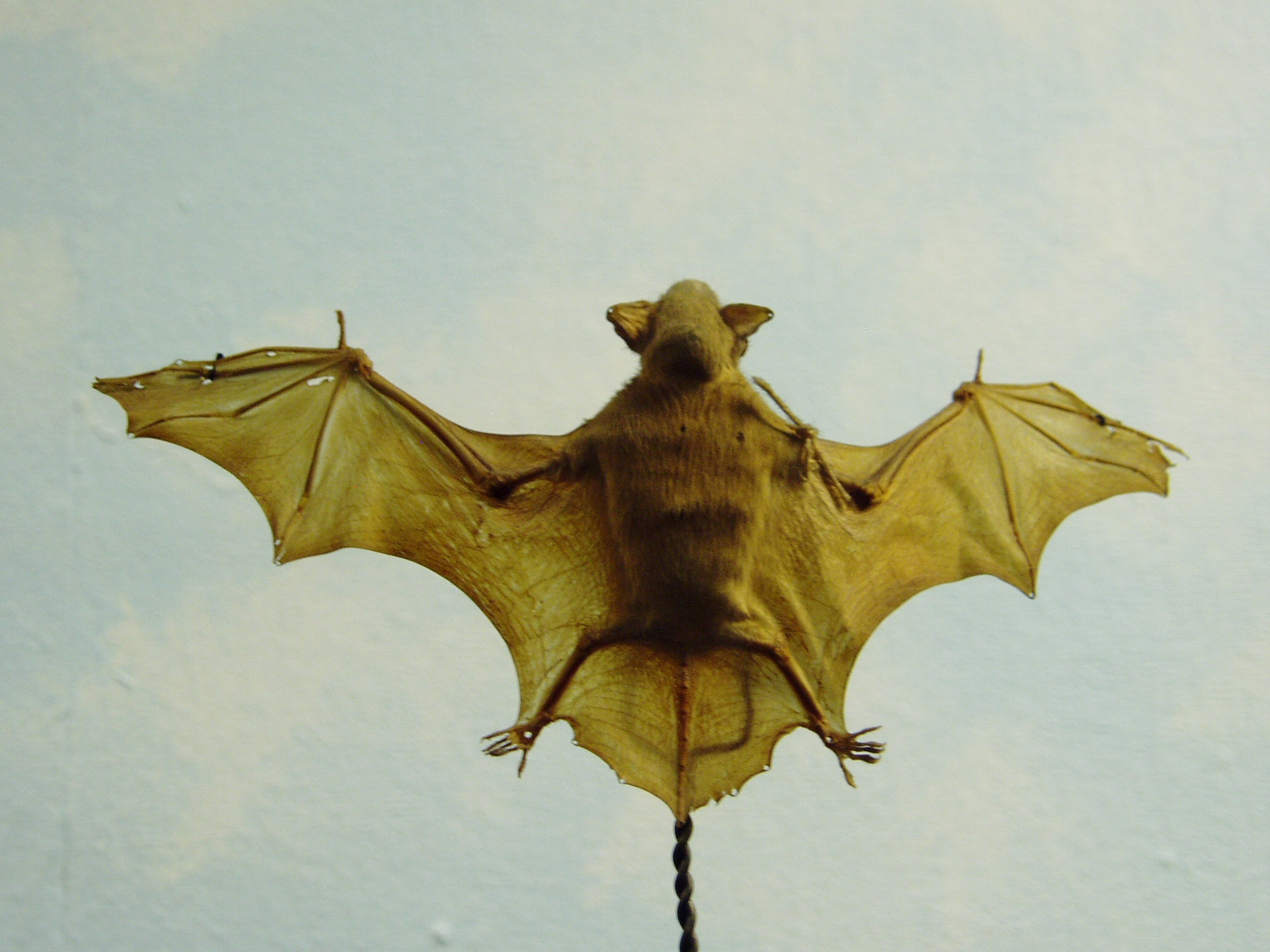

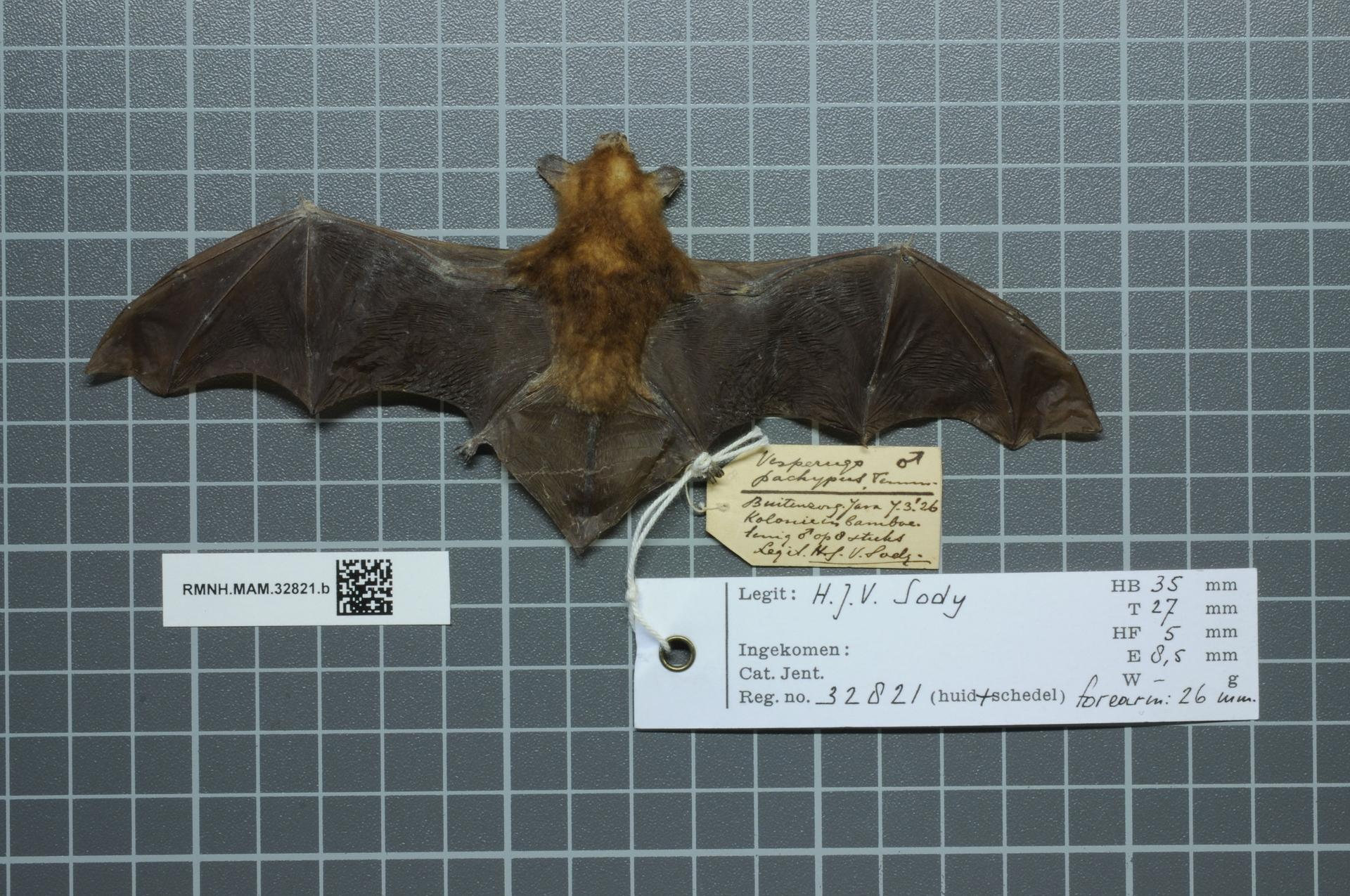

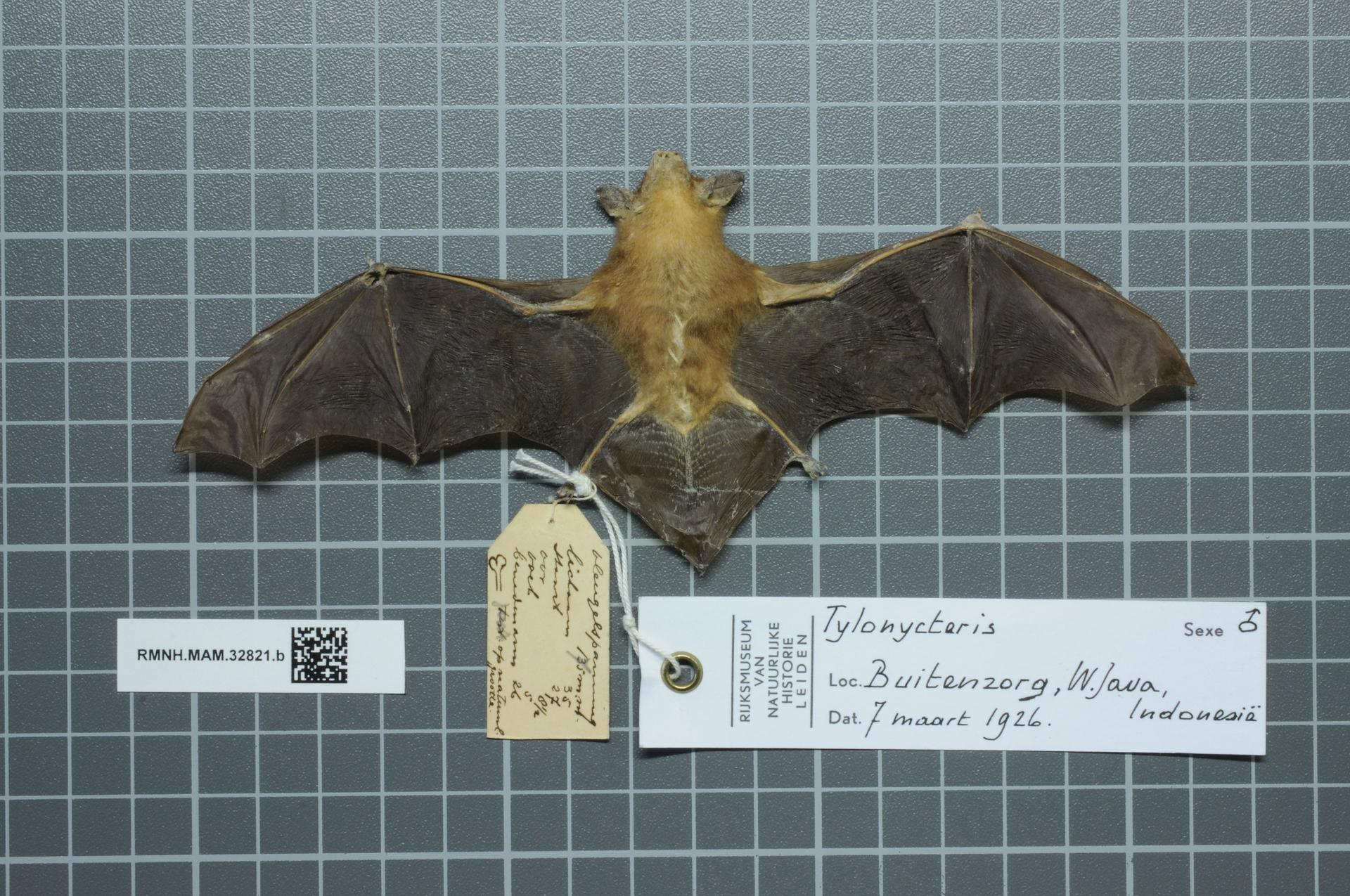

== Order: Eulipotyphla ==
=== Family: Soricidae ===
==== Genus: Suncus ====
===== Species: Suncus dayi (Etruscan shrew) =====
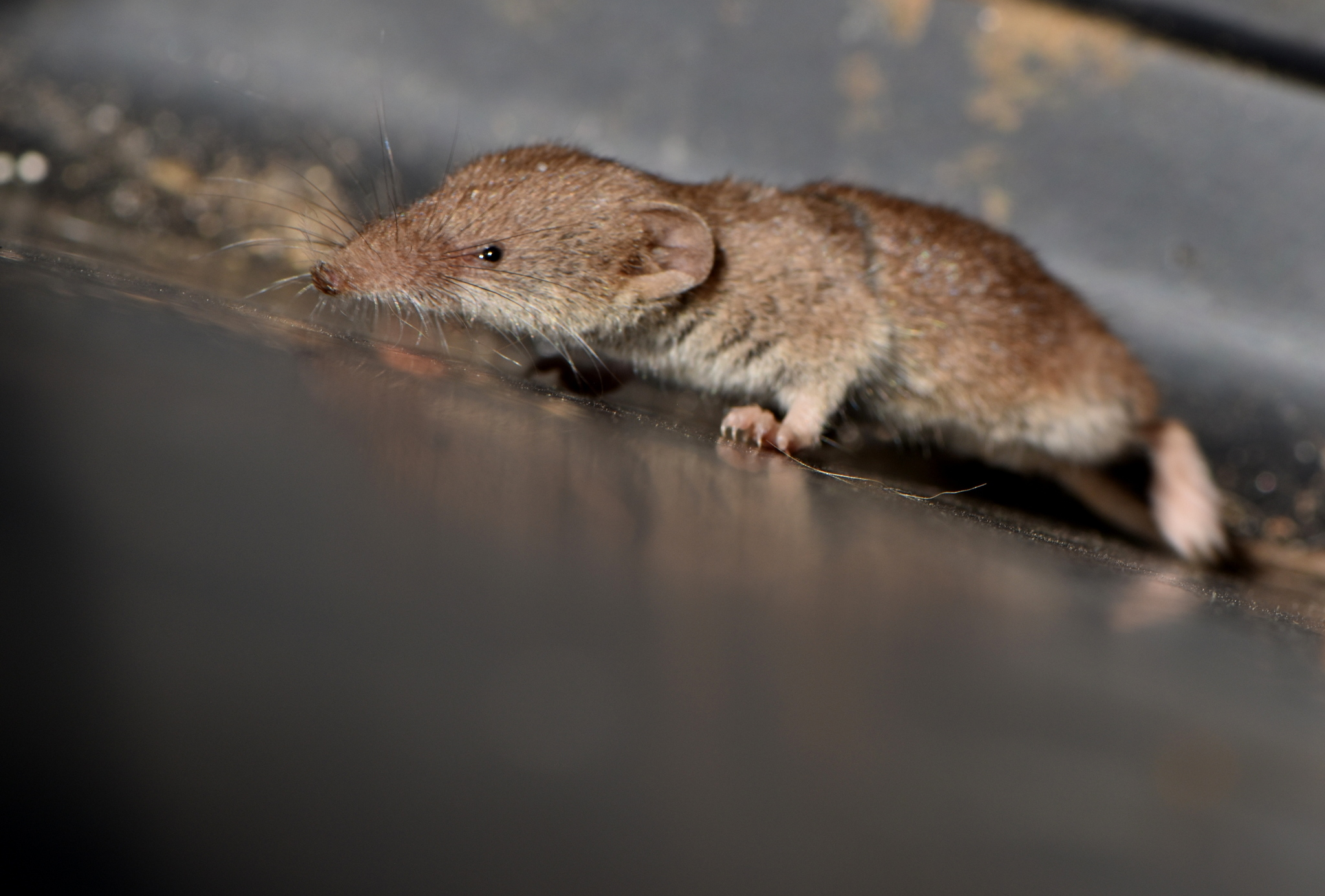

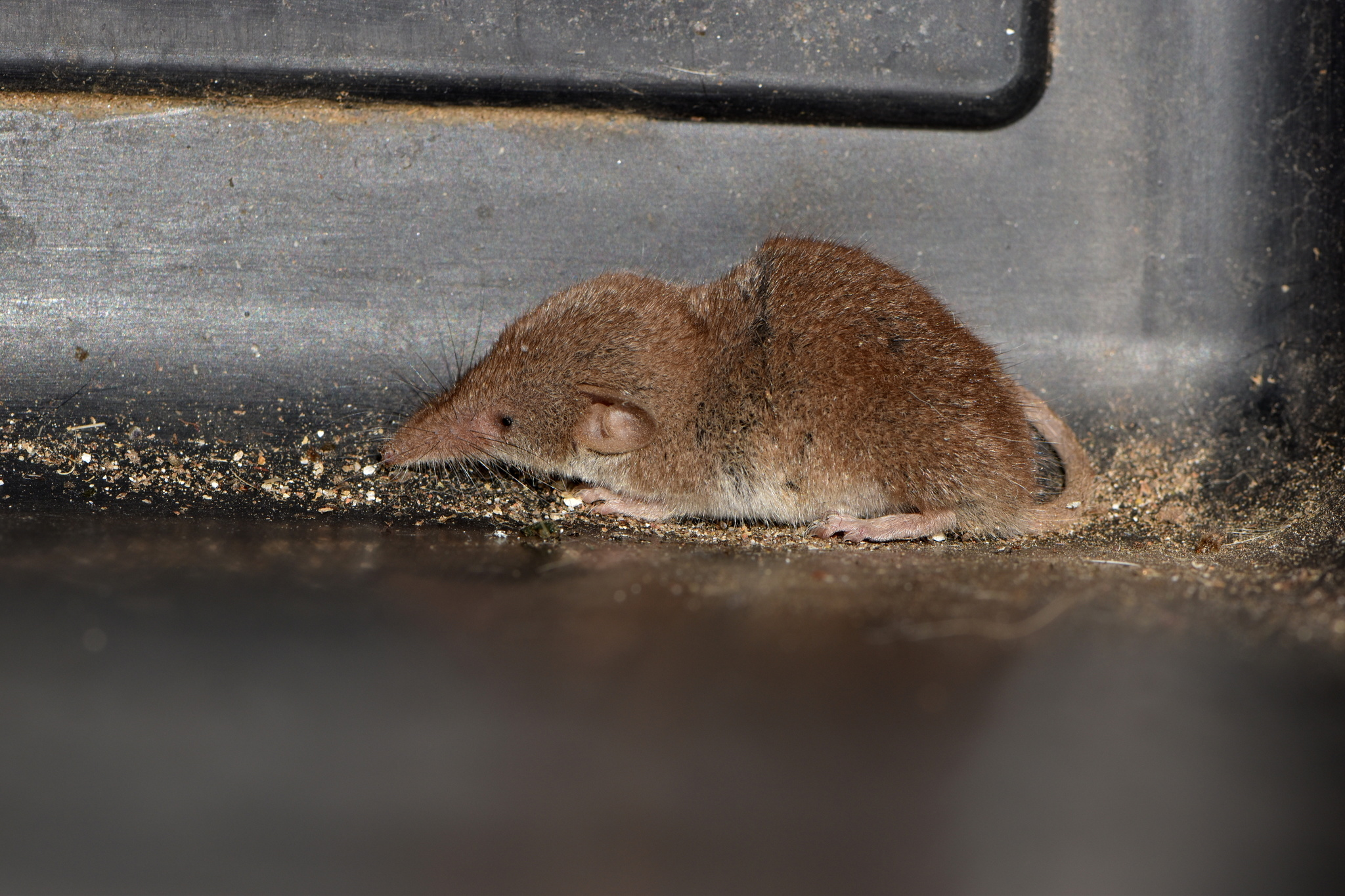

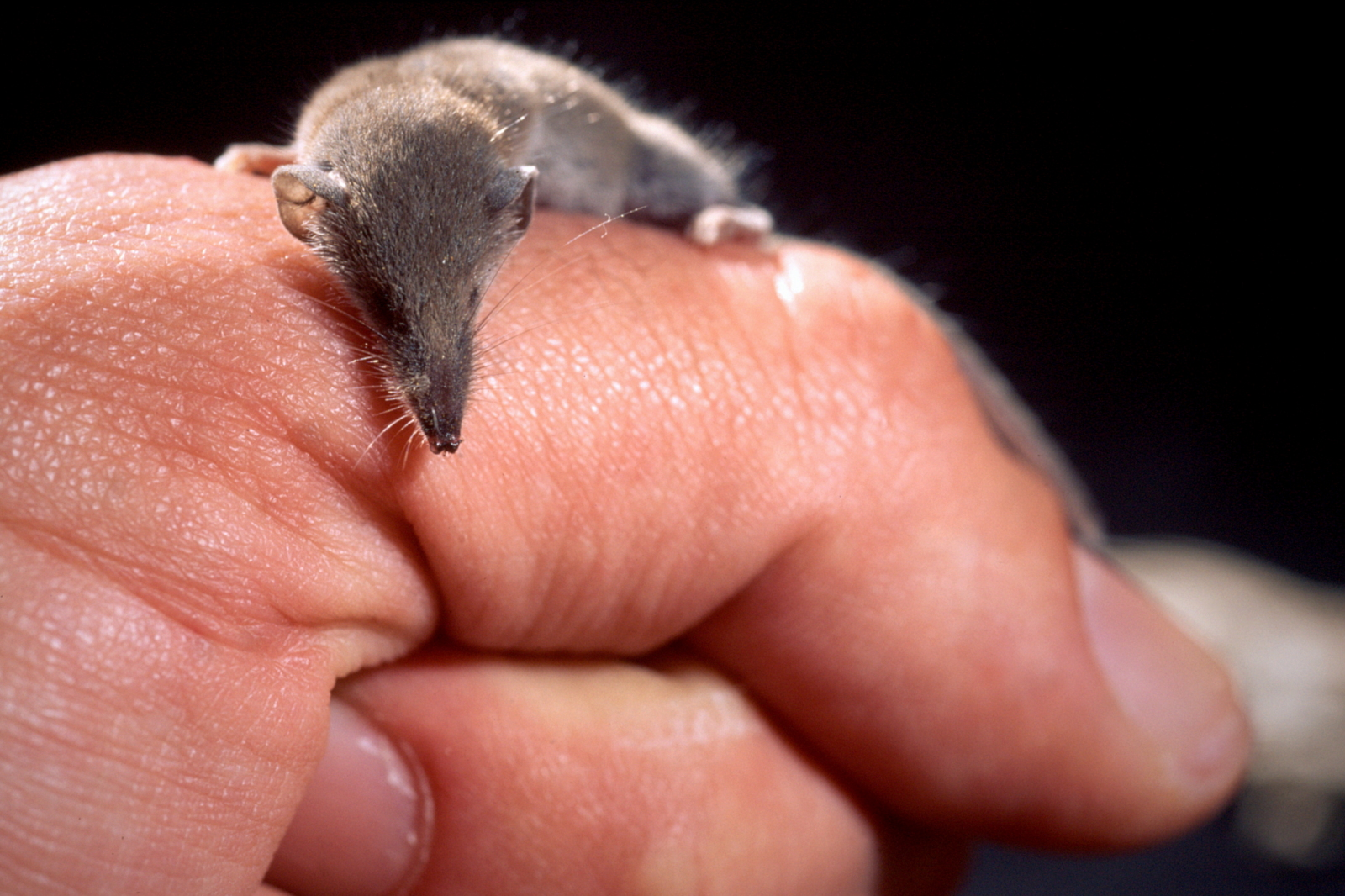

===== Species: Suncus murinus (Asian house shrew / വീട്ടു നച്ചെലി) =====
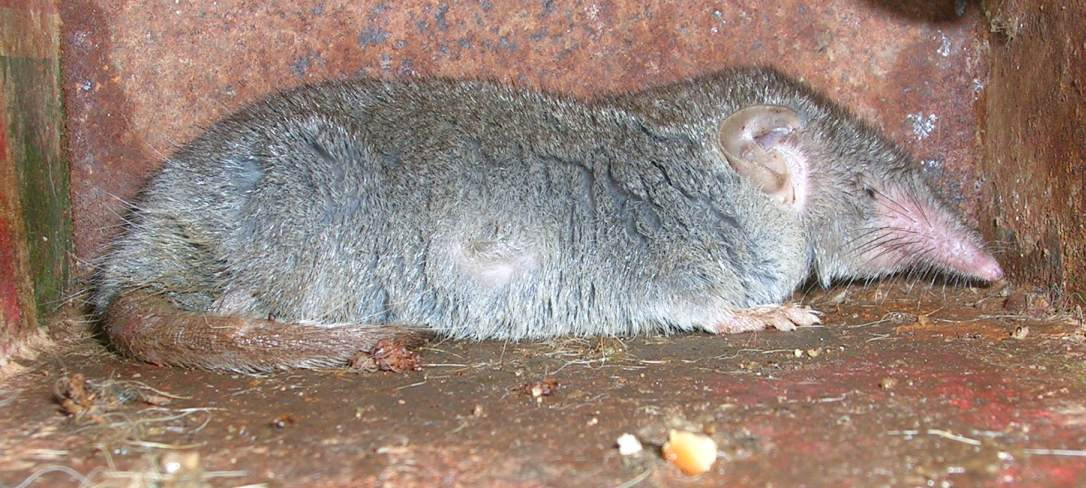

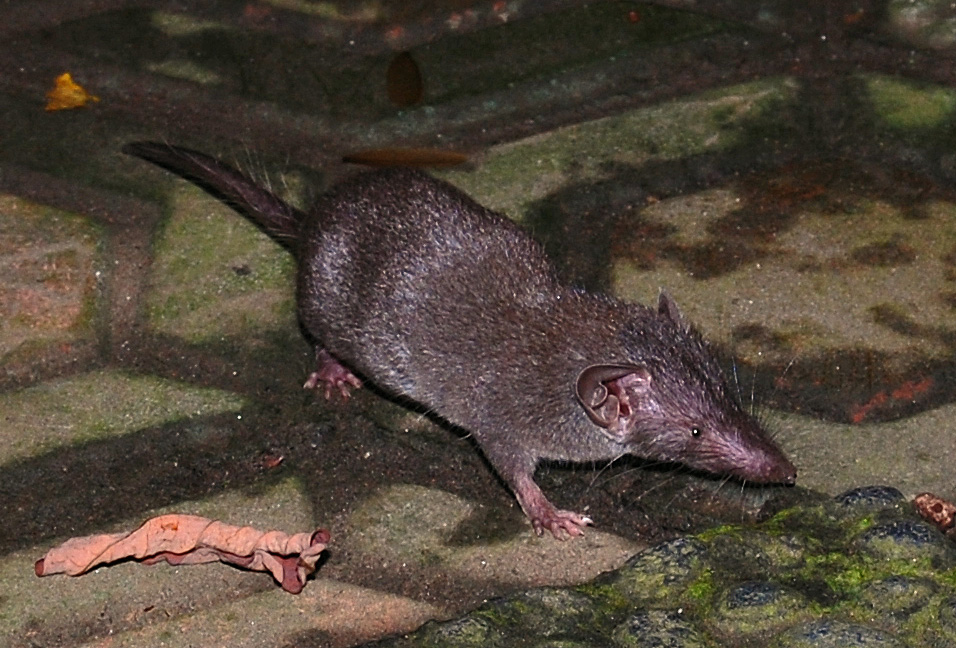

== Order: Lagomorpha ==
=== Family: Leporidae ===
==== Genus: Lepus ====
===== Species: Lepus nigricollis (Indian hare / കാട്ടുമുയൽ) =====
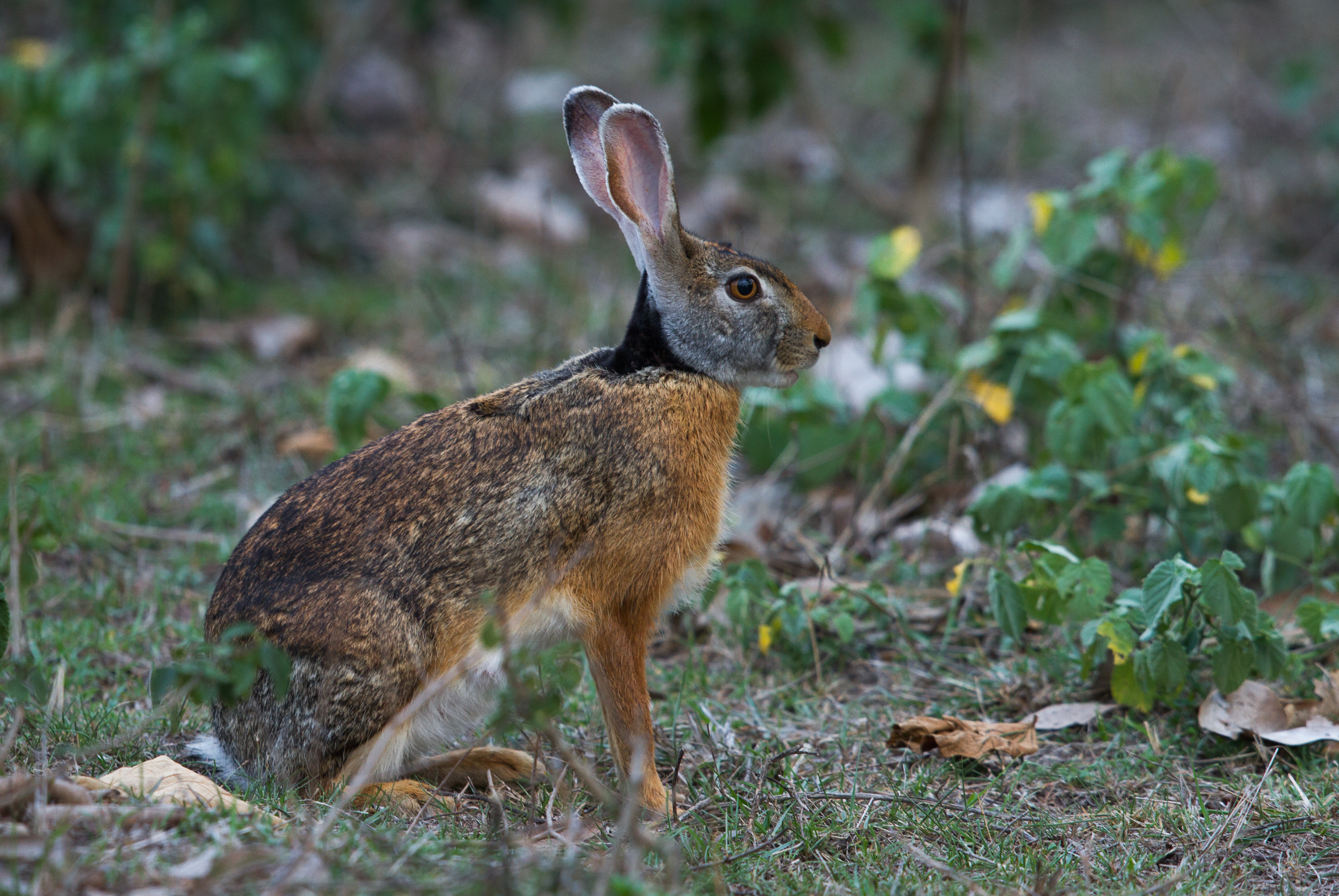

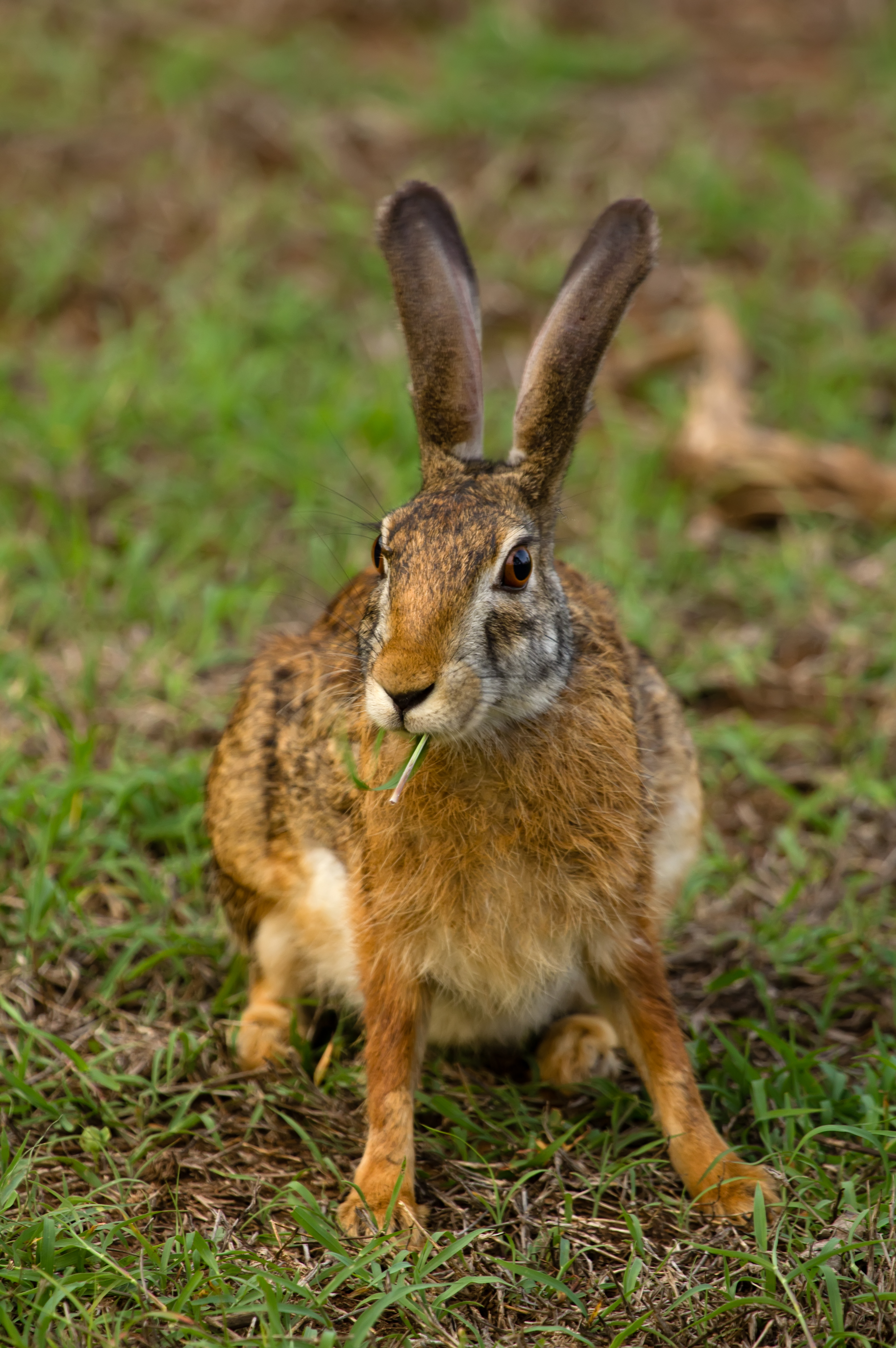

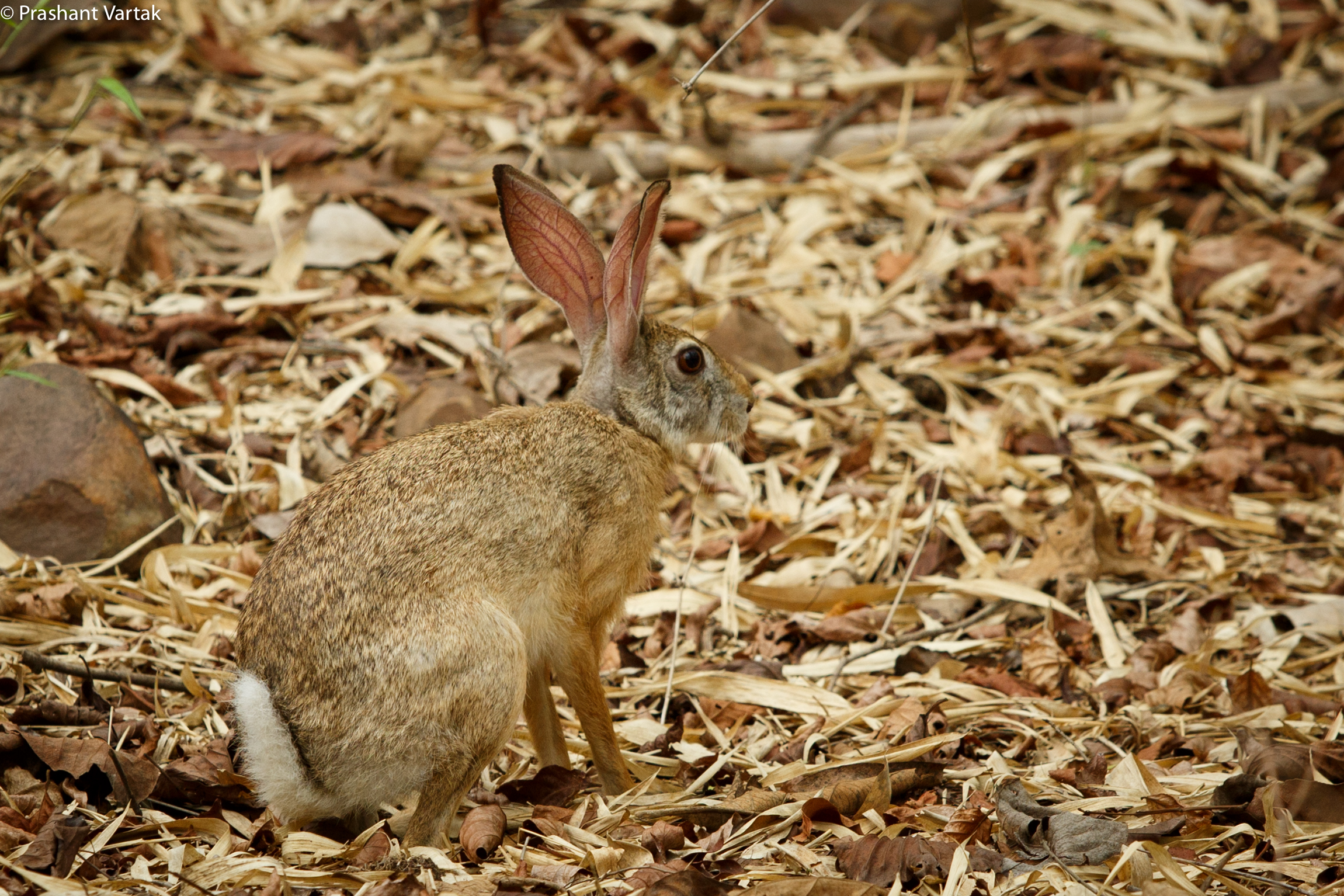

== Order: Pholidota ==
=== Family: Manidae ===
==== Genus: Manis ====
===== Species: Manis crassicaudata (Indian pangolin / ഈനാമ്പേച്ചി) =====
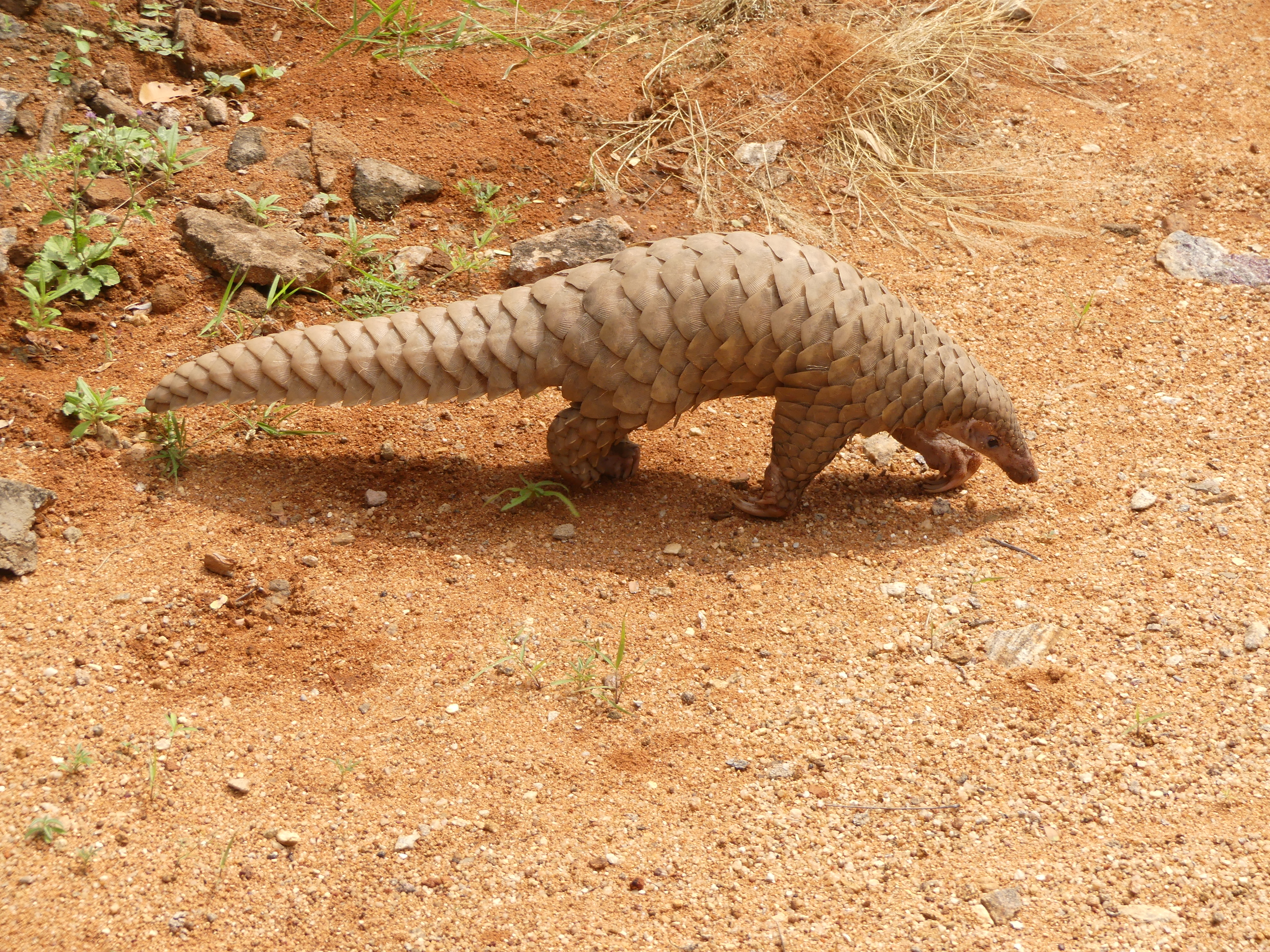

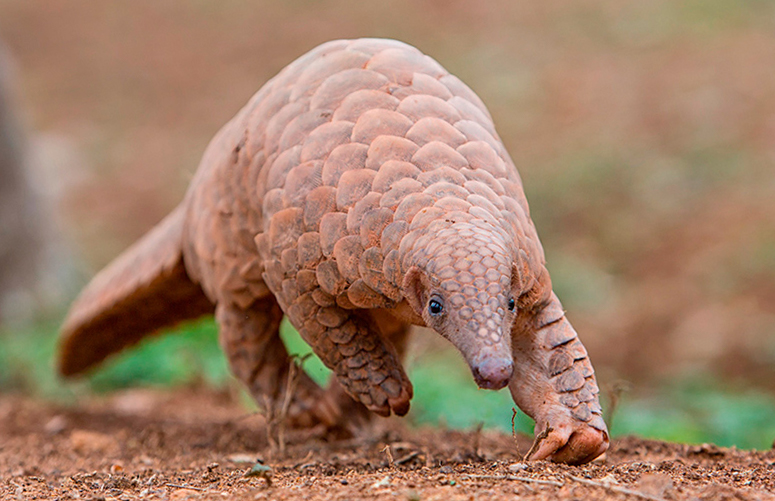

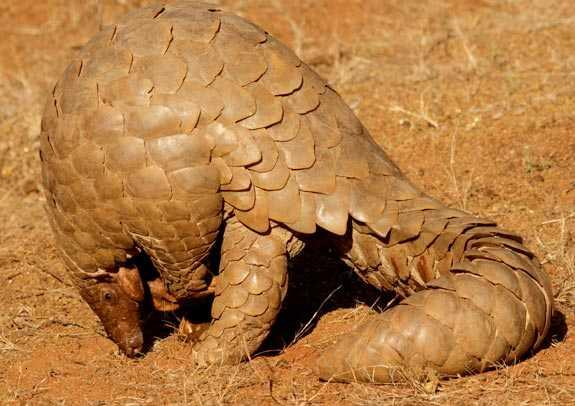

== Order: Primates ==
=== Family: Cercopithecidae ===
==== Genus: Macaca ====
===== Species: Macaca radiata (bonnet macaque / നാടൻ കുരങ്ങ്) =====
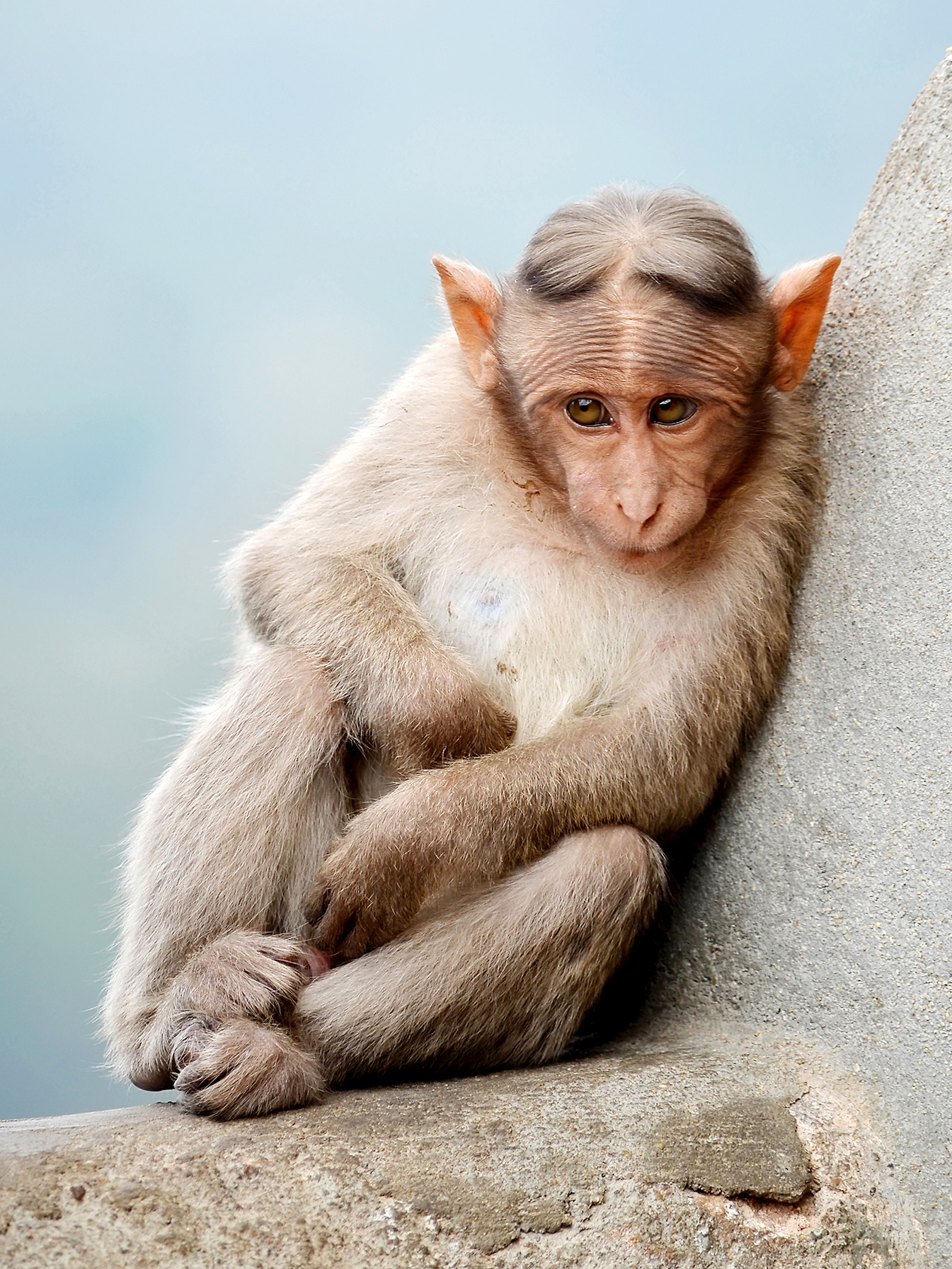

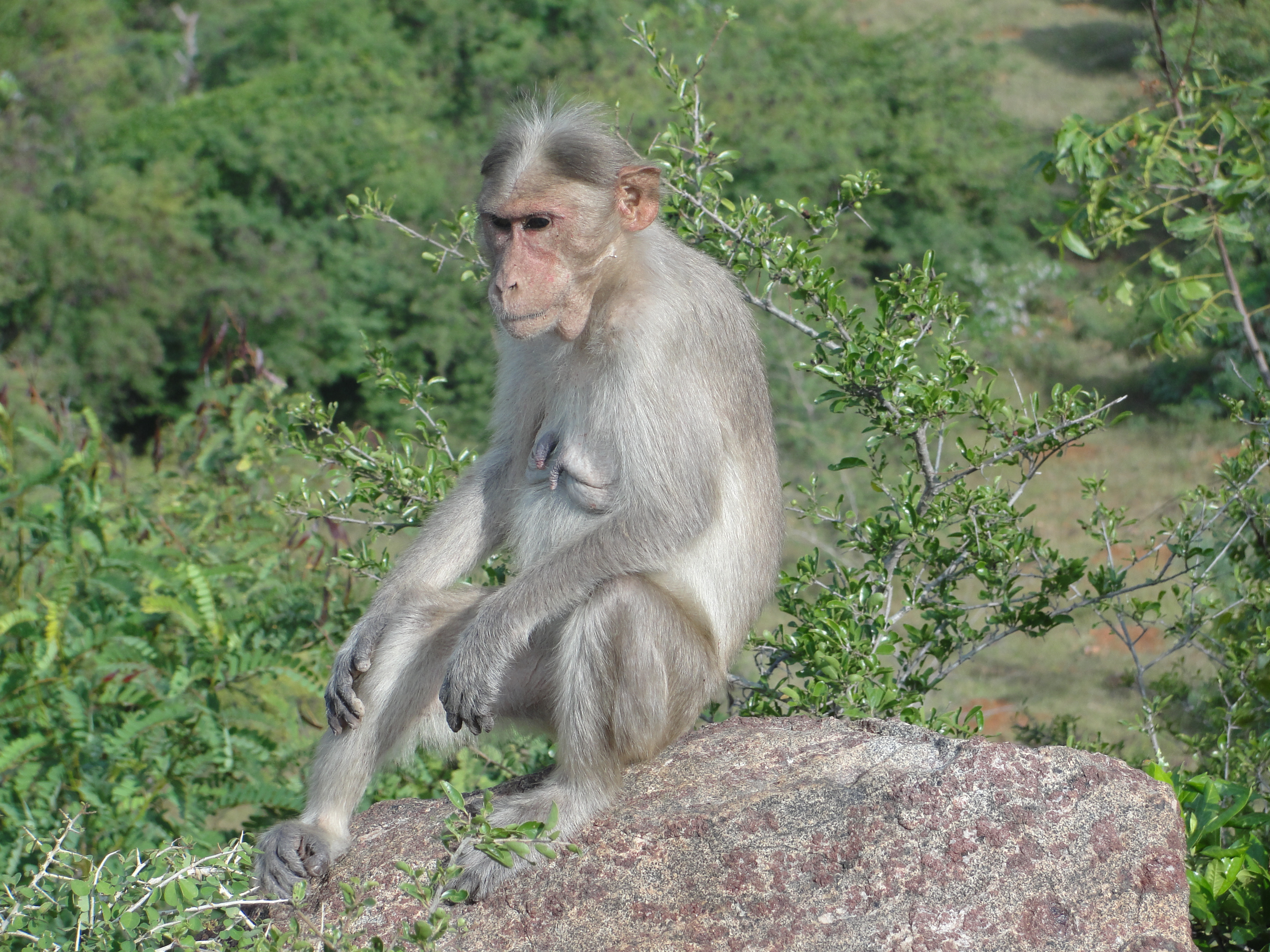

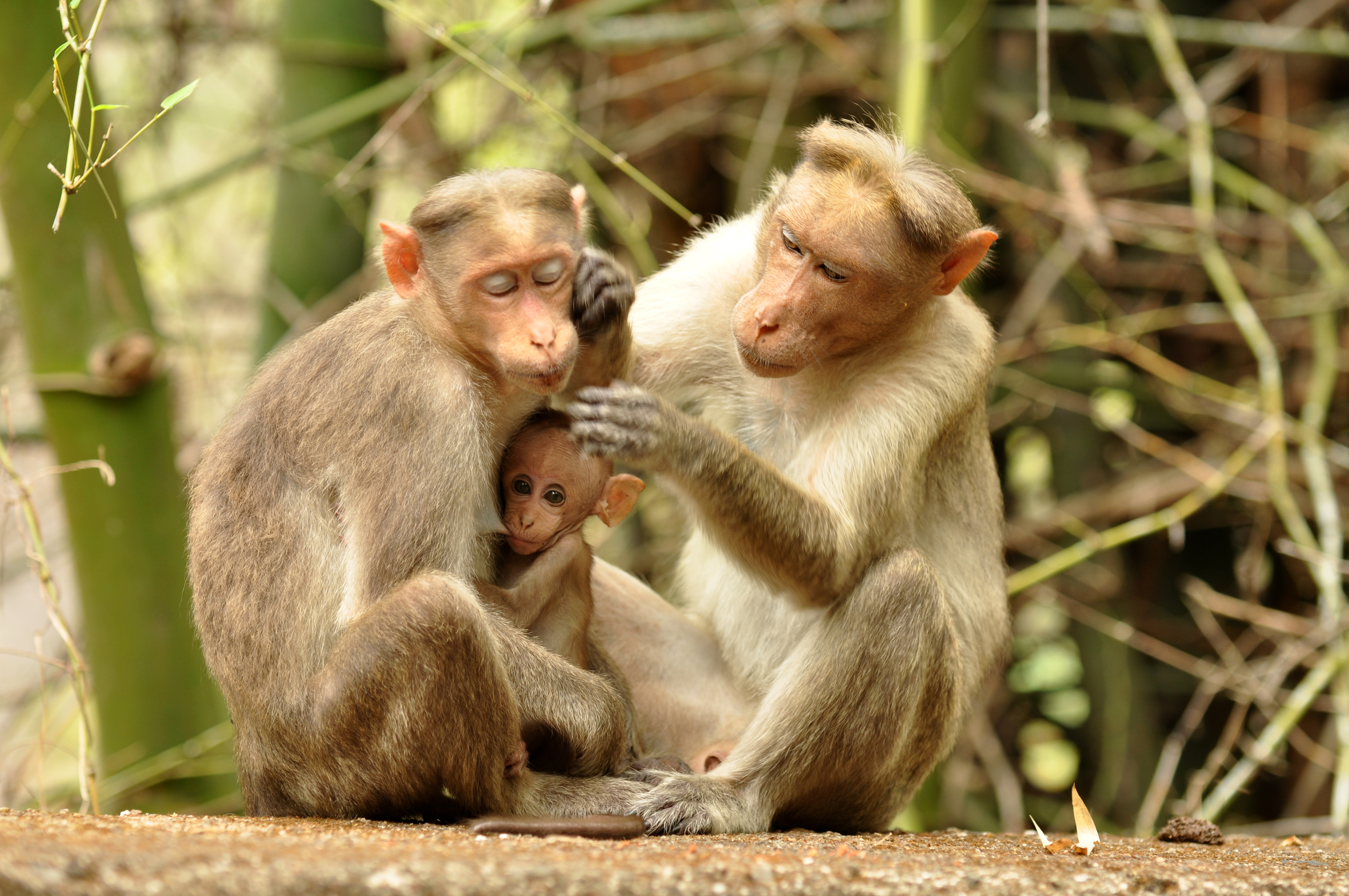

===== Species: Macaca silenus (lion-tailed macaque / സിംഹവാലൻ കുരങ്ങ്‌) =====
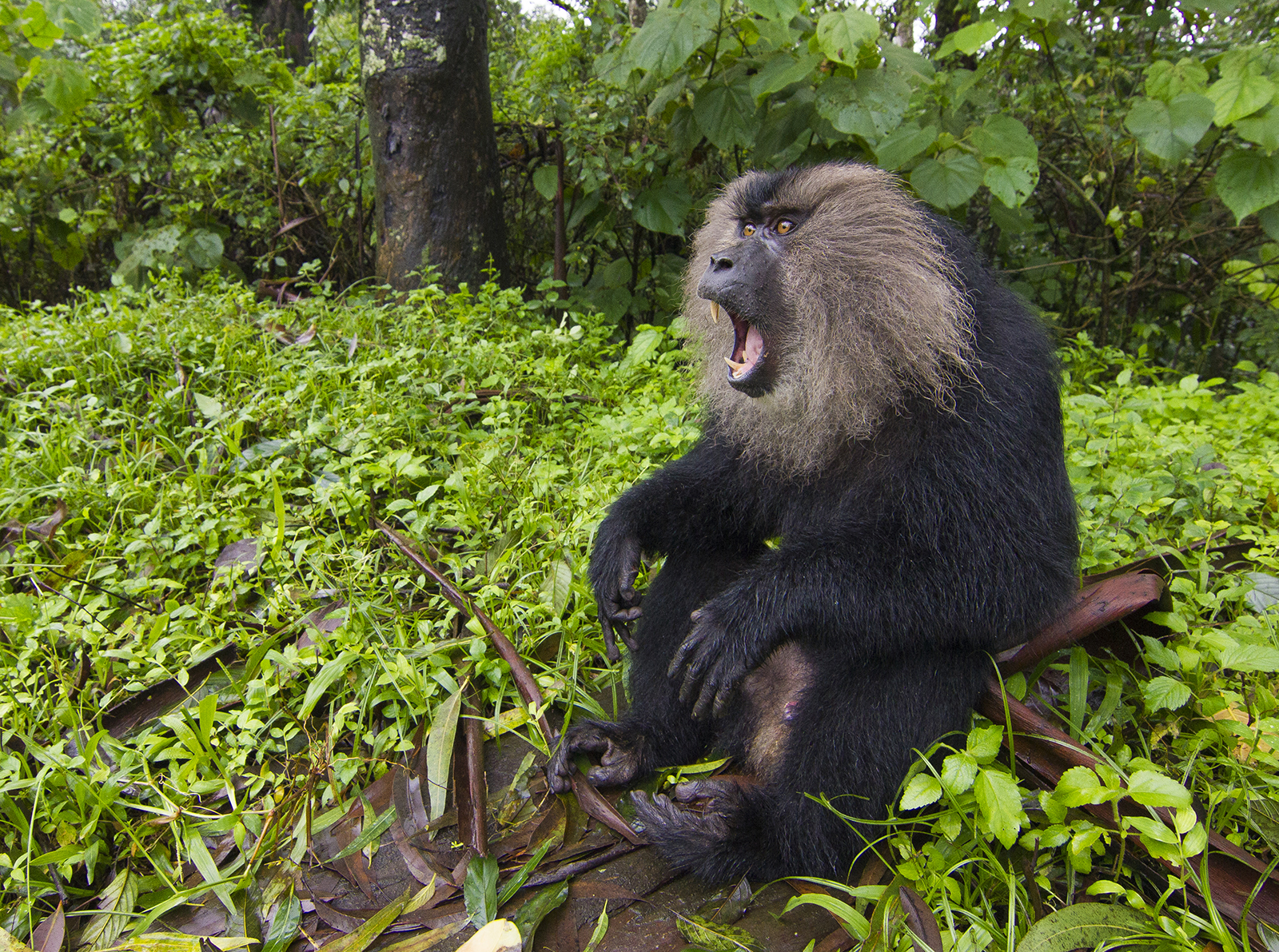

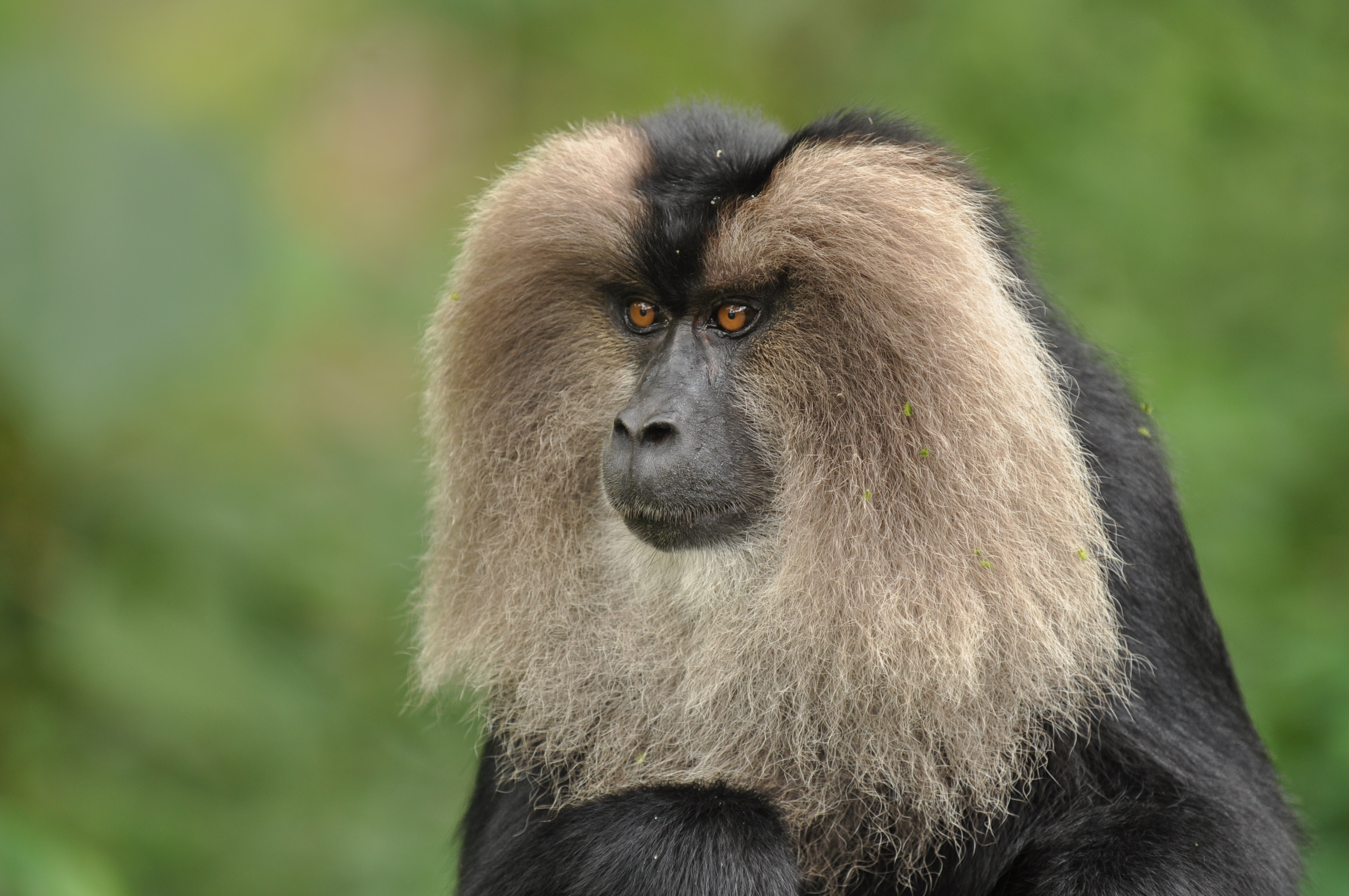

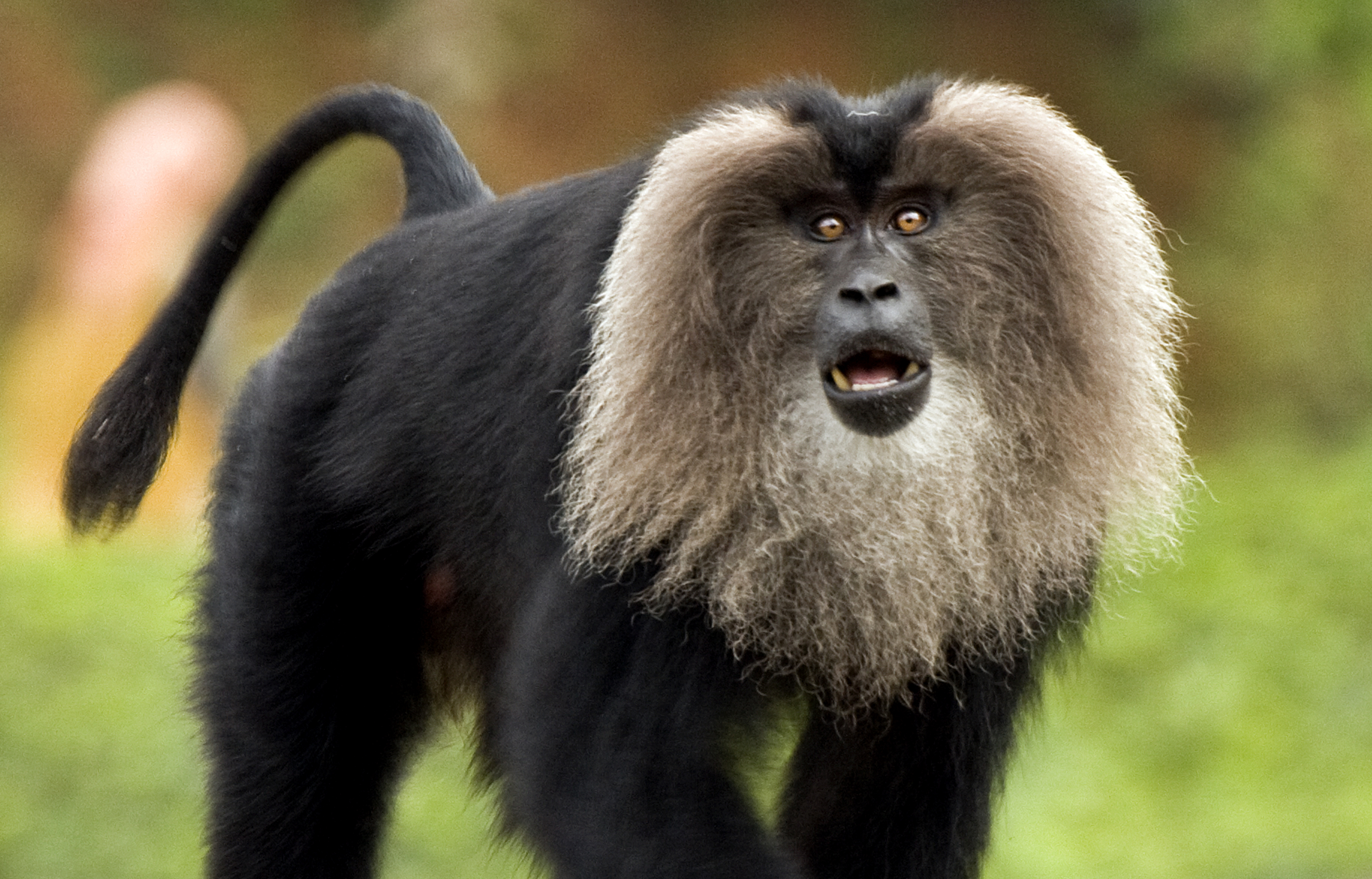

==== Genus: Semnopithecus ====
===== Species: Semnopithecus hypoleucos (black-footed grey langur / കരിംകയ്യൻ കുരങ്ങ്) =====
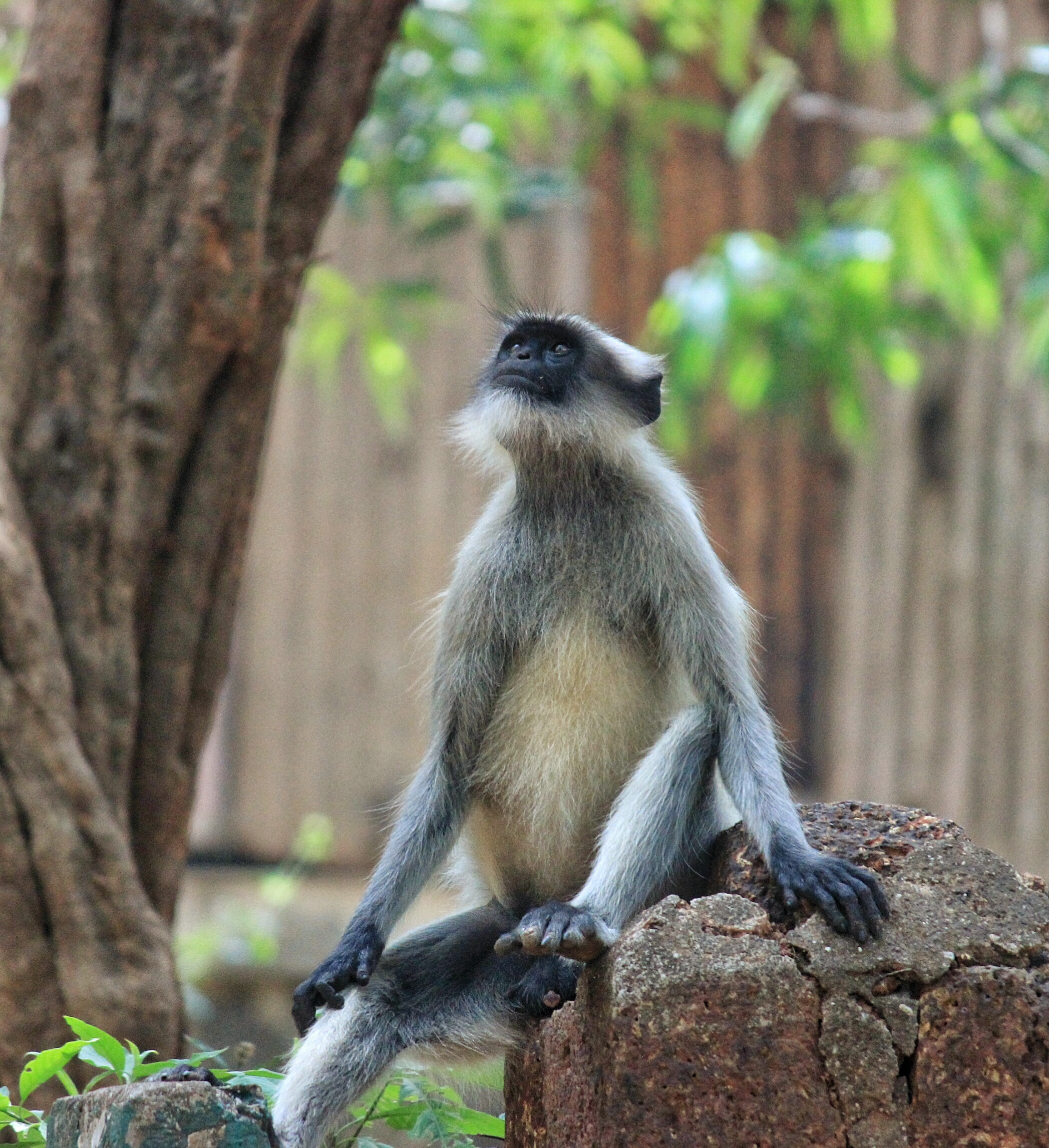

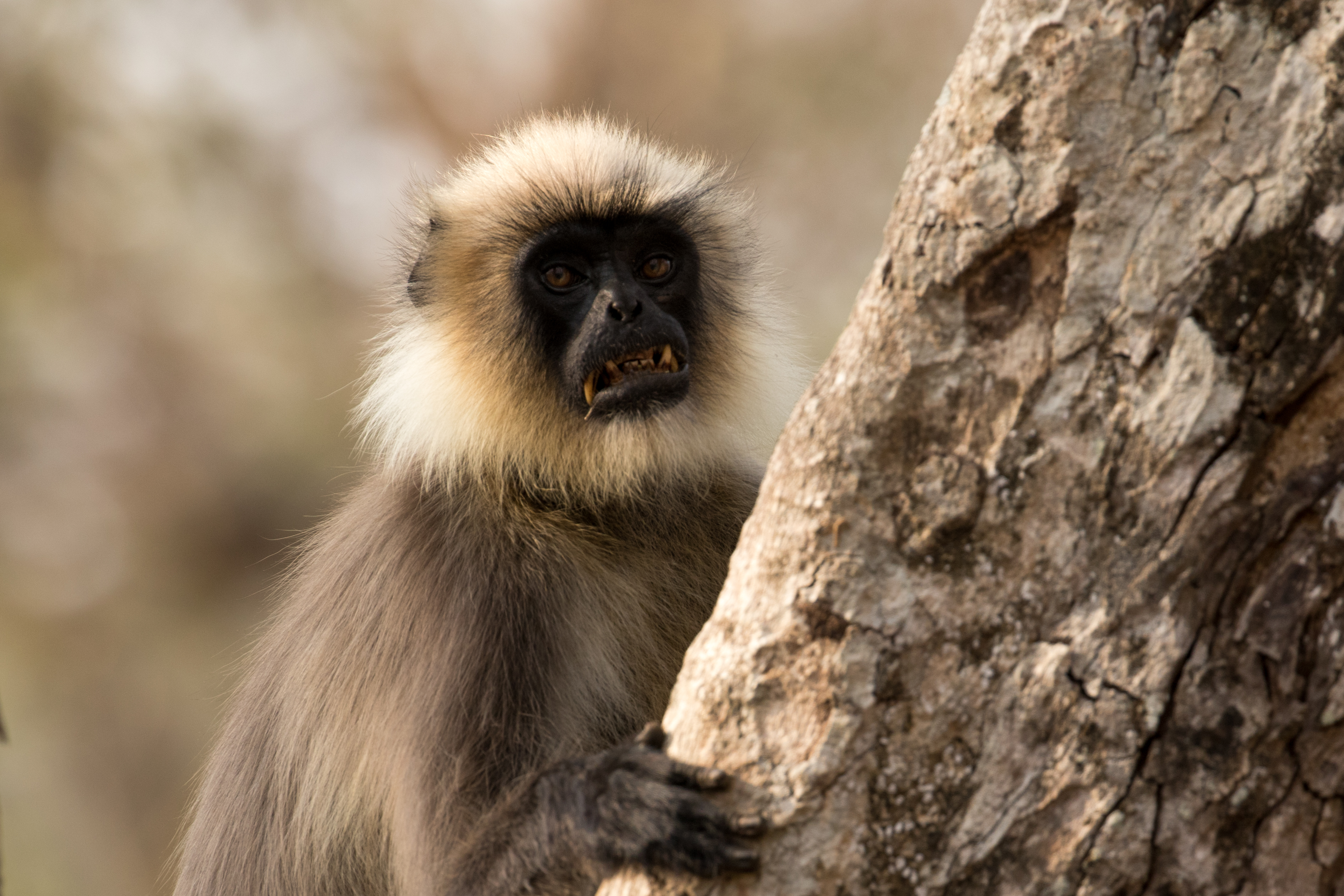

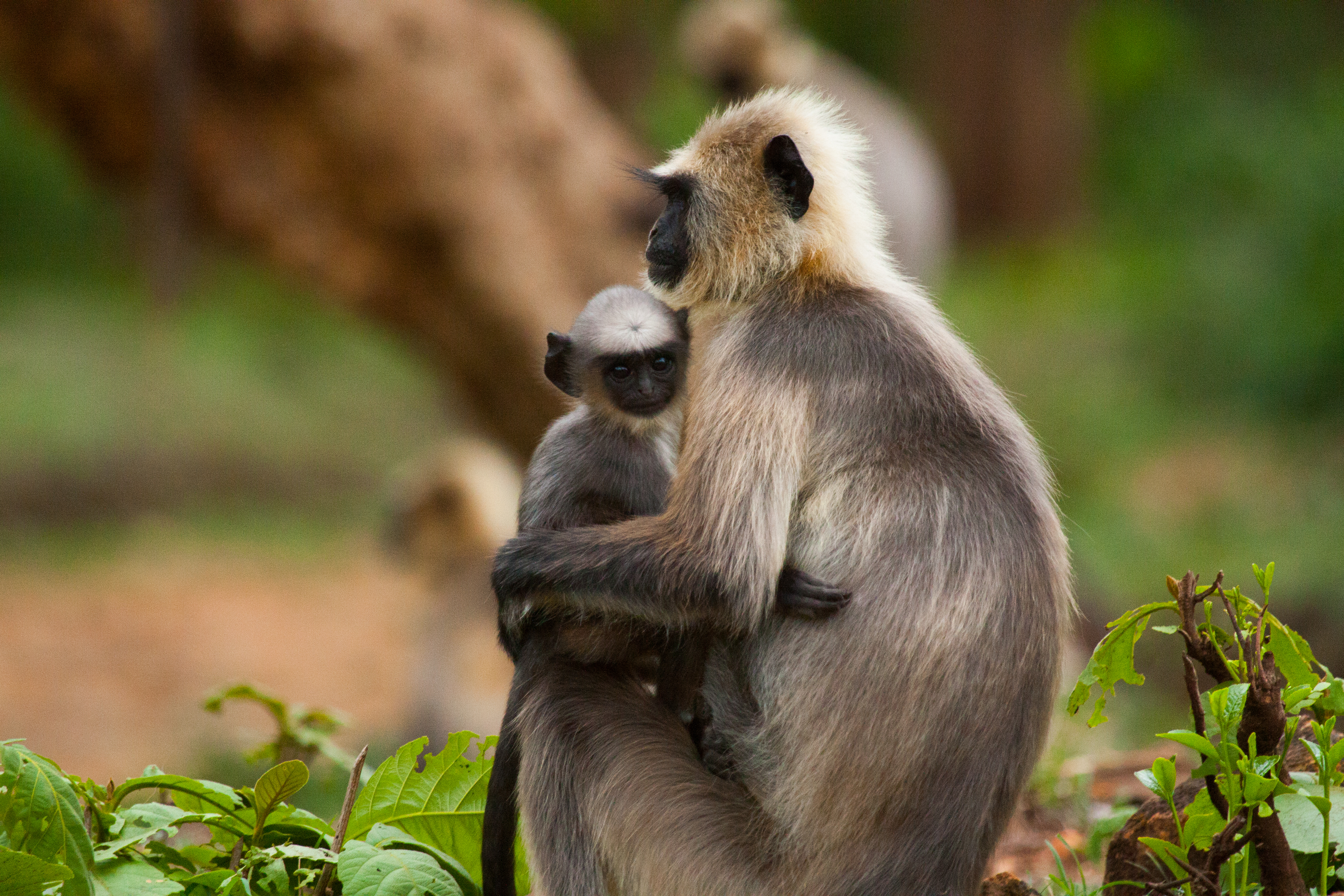

===== Species: Semnopithecus priam (tufted grey langur / തൊപ്പിഹനുമാൻ കുരങ്ങ്) =====
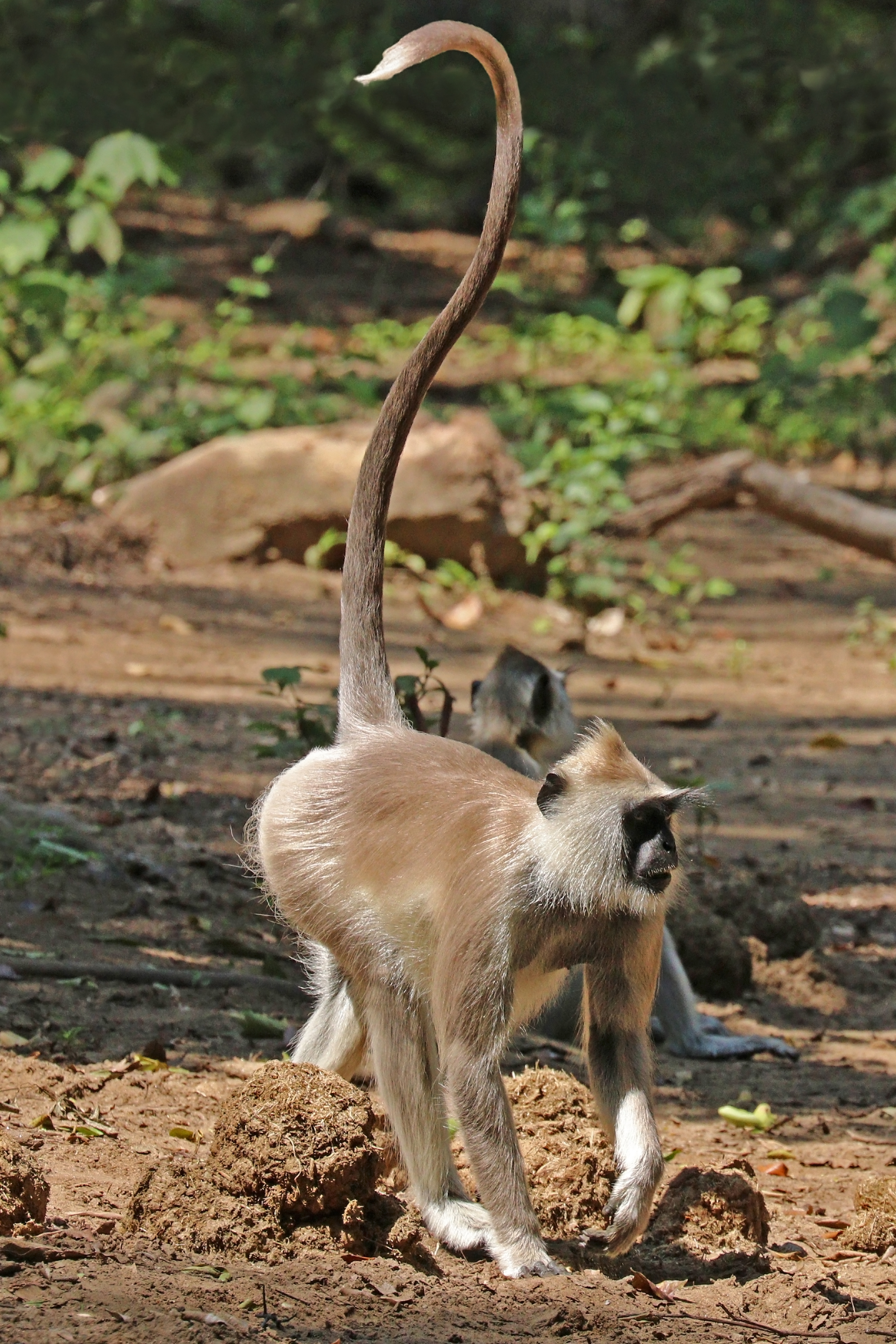

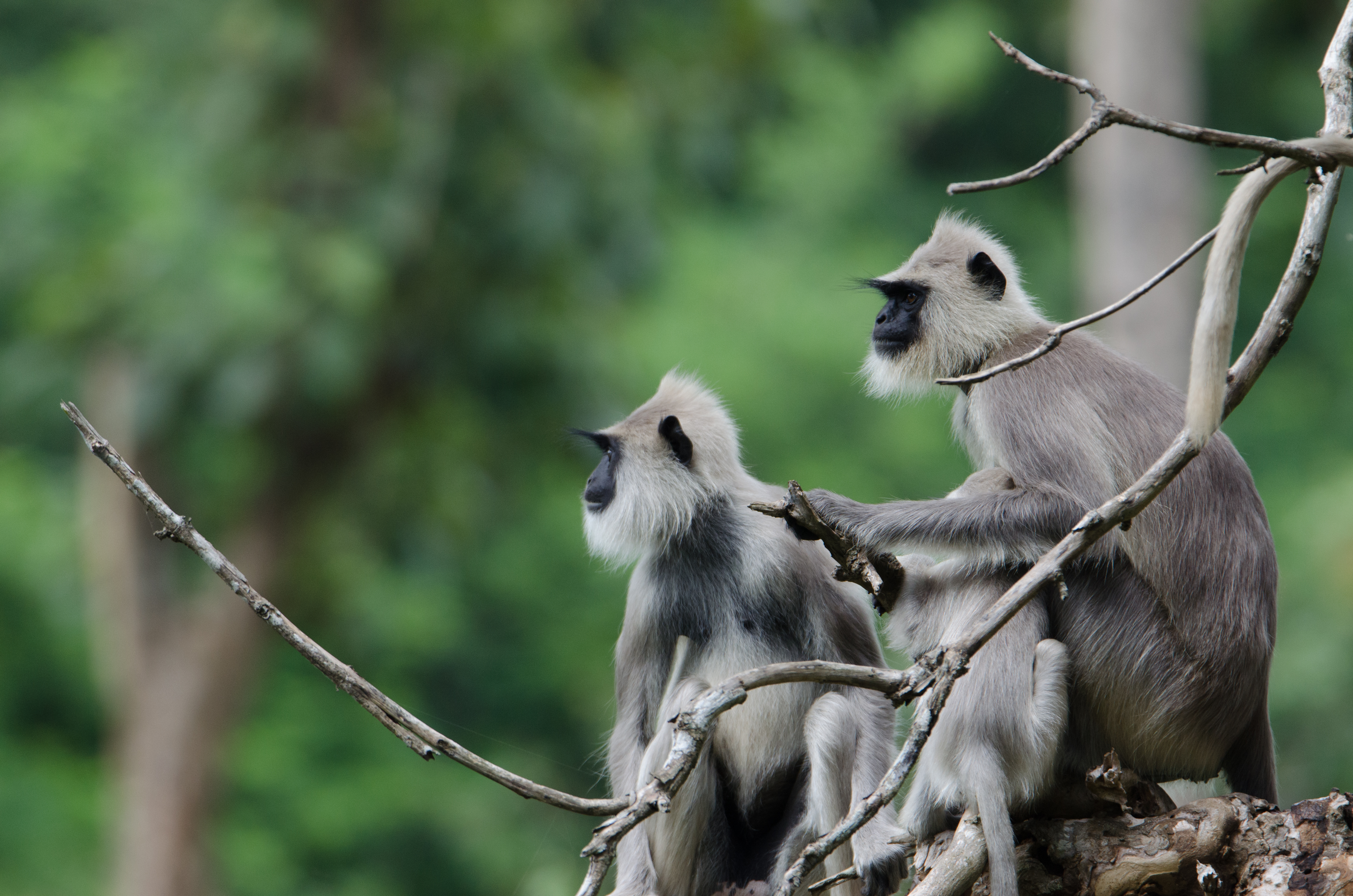

==== Genus: Trachypithecus ====
===== Species: Trachypithecus johnii (Nilgiri langur / കരിങ്കുരങ്ങ്) =====
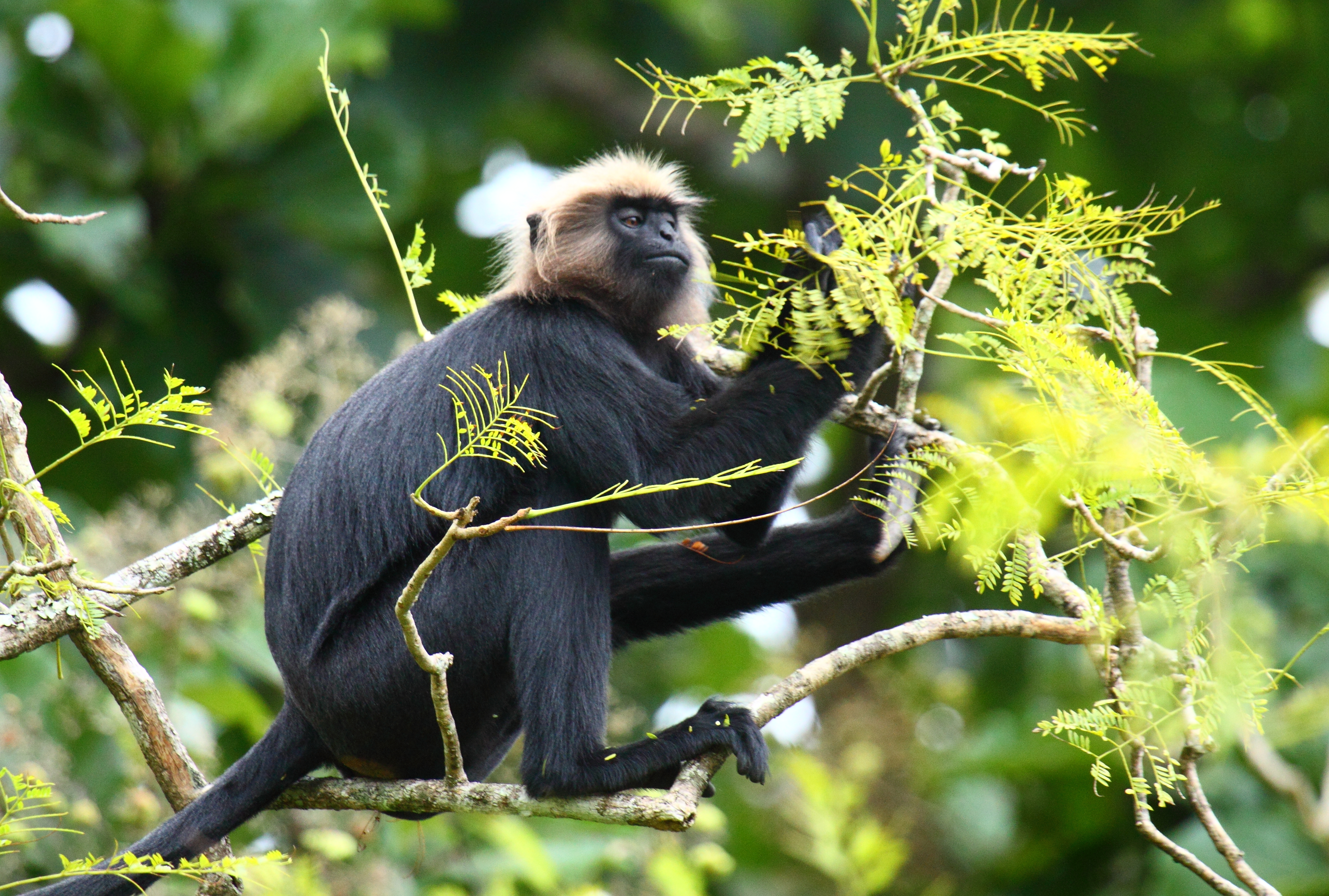

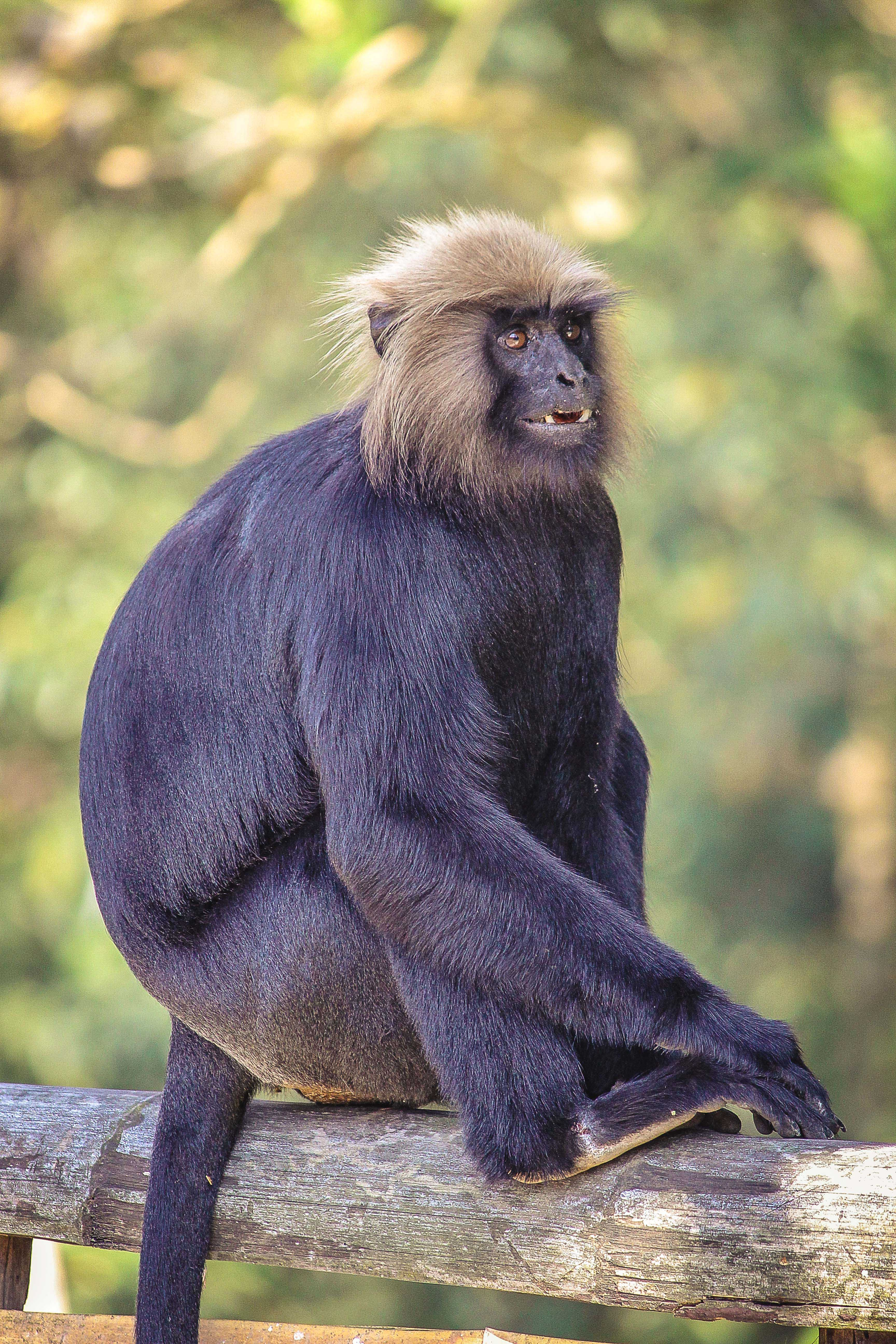

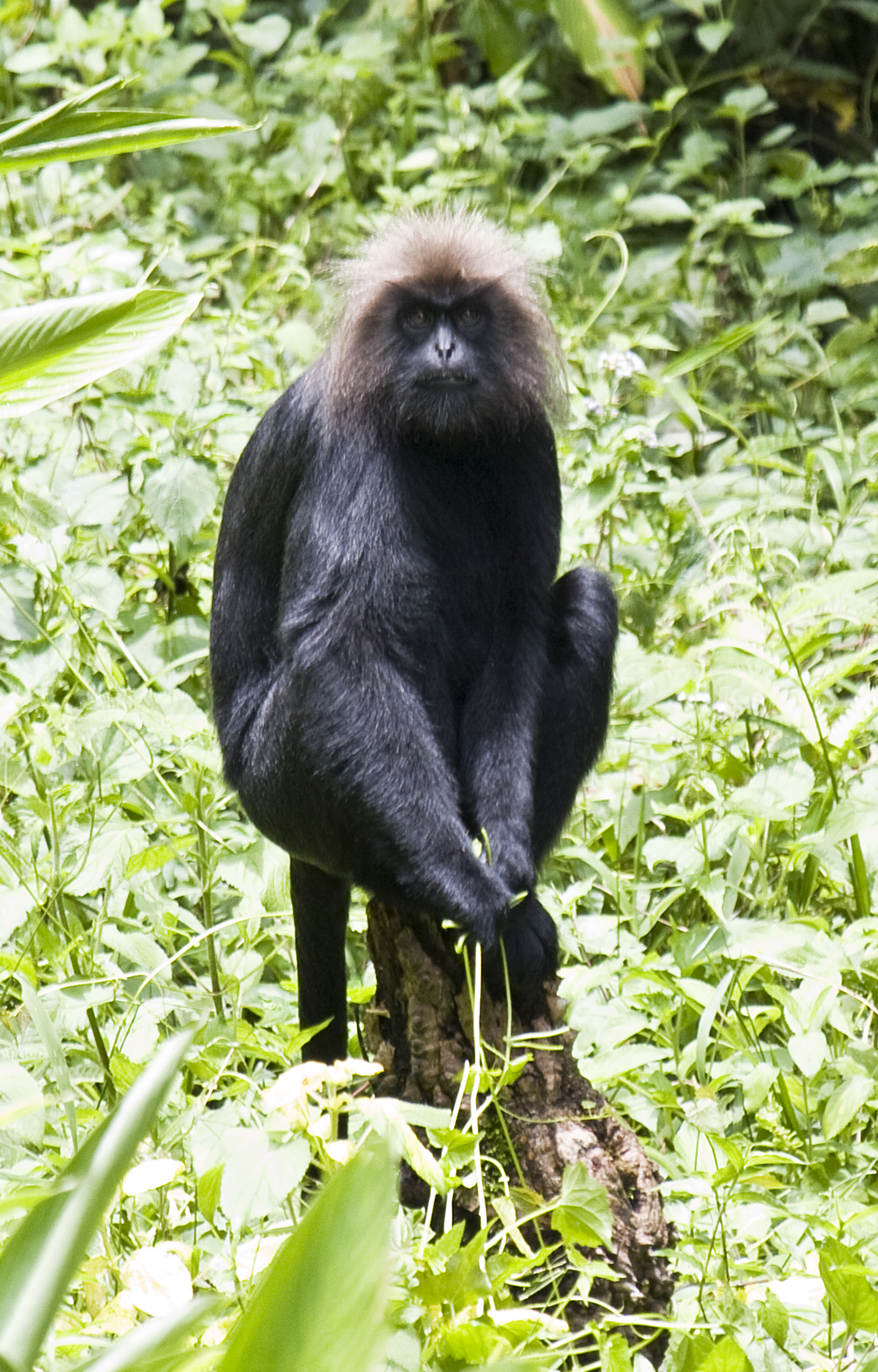

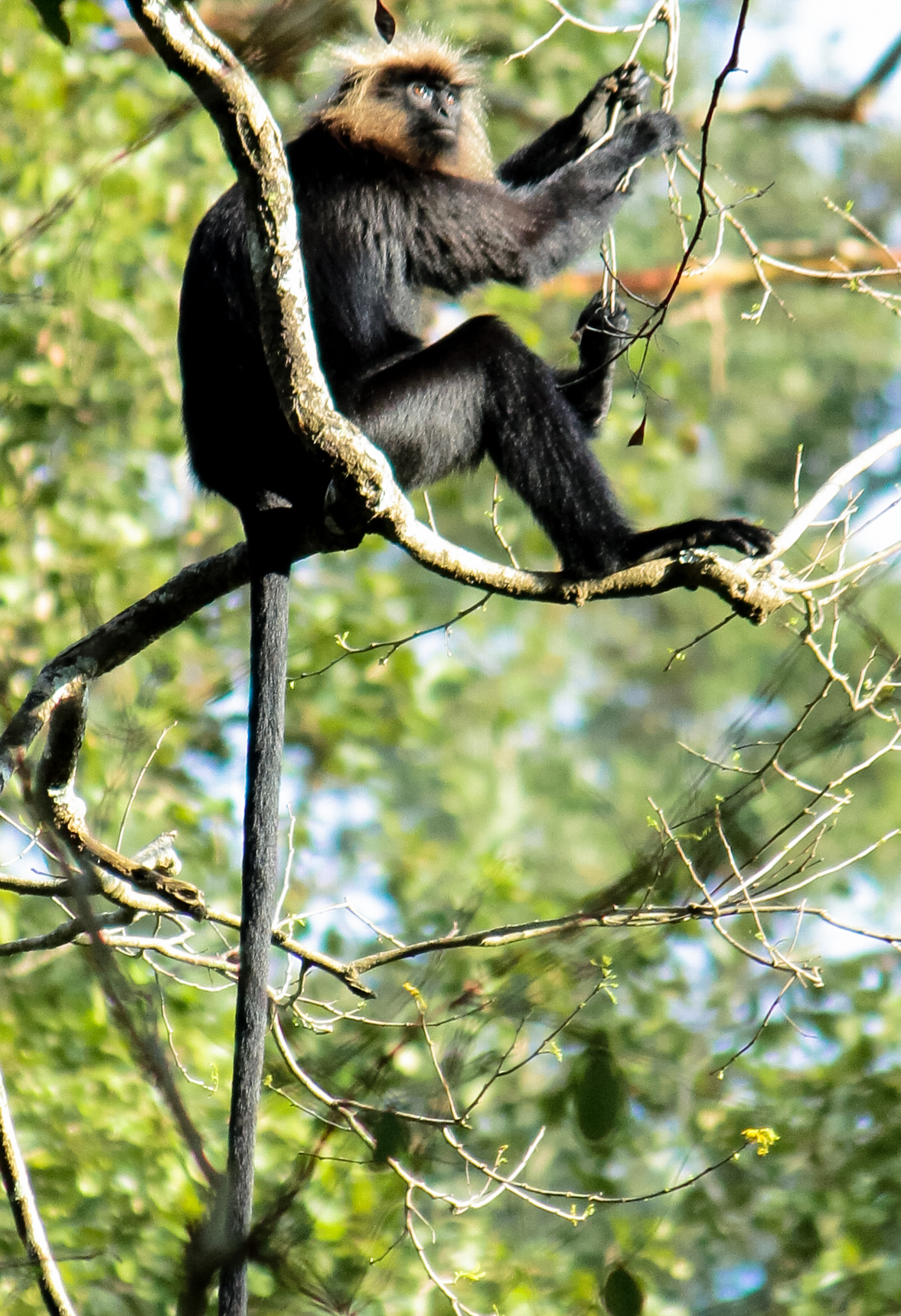

=== Family: Lorisidae ===
==== Genus: Loris ====
===== Species: Loris lydekkerianus (grey slender loris / കുട്ടിത്തേവാങ്ക്) =====
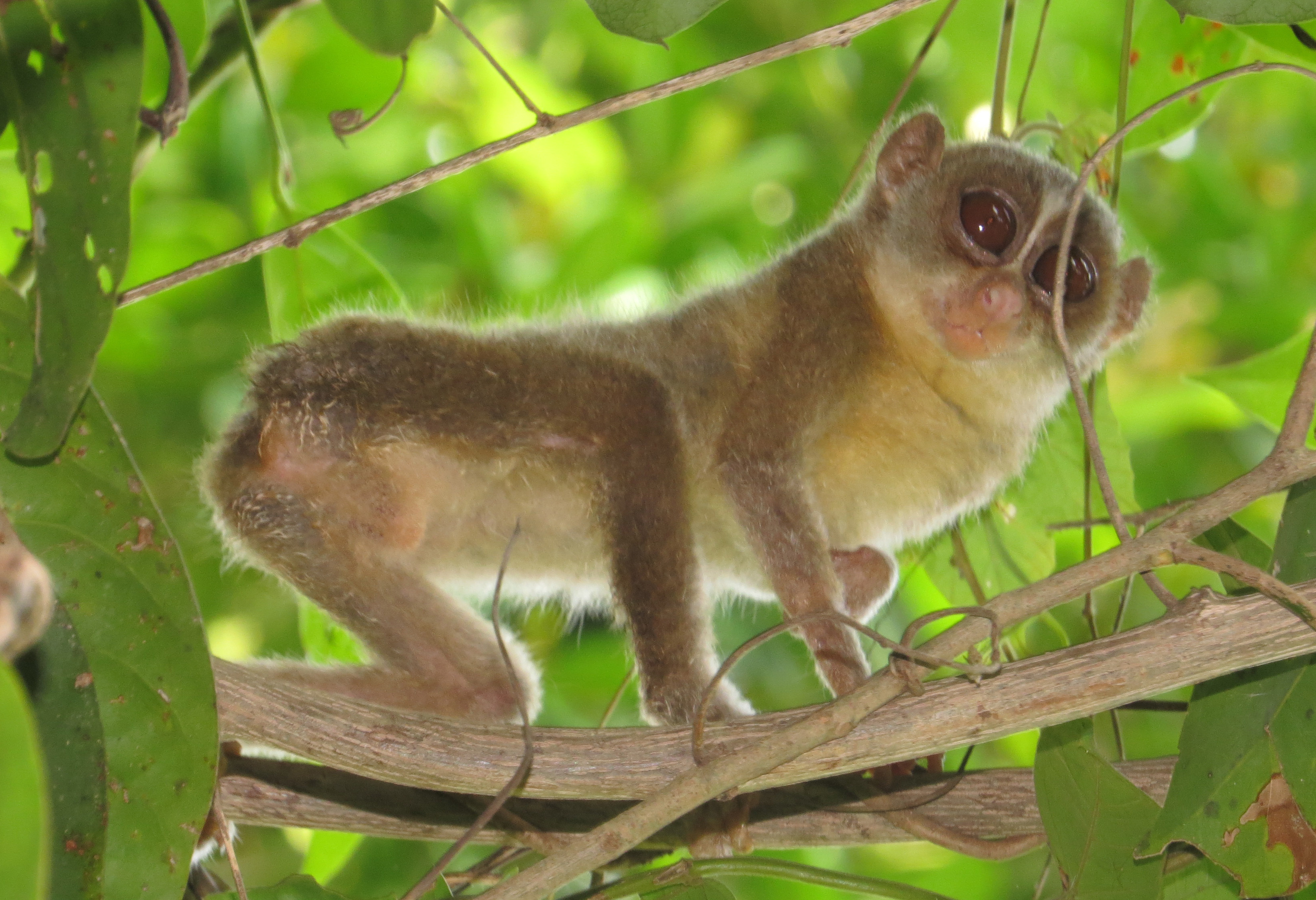

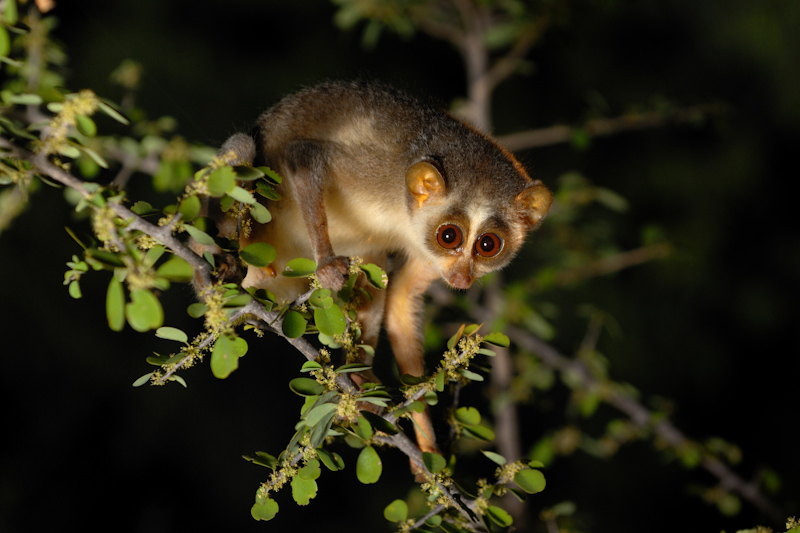

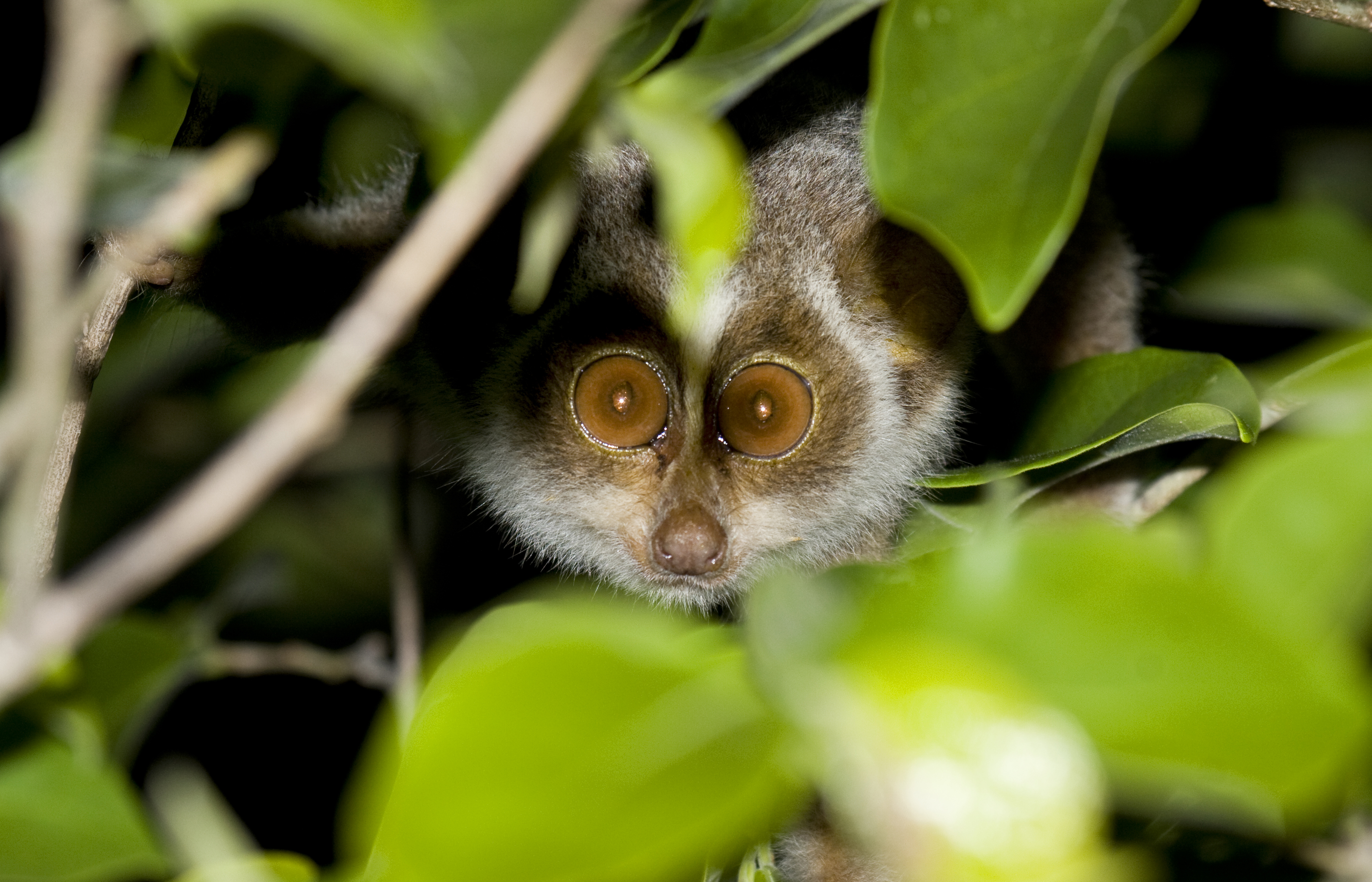

== Order: Proboscidea ==
=== Family: Elephantidae ===
==== Genus: Elephas ====
===== Species: Elephas maximus indicus (Indian elephant / ഇന്ത്യൻ ആന) =====
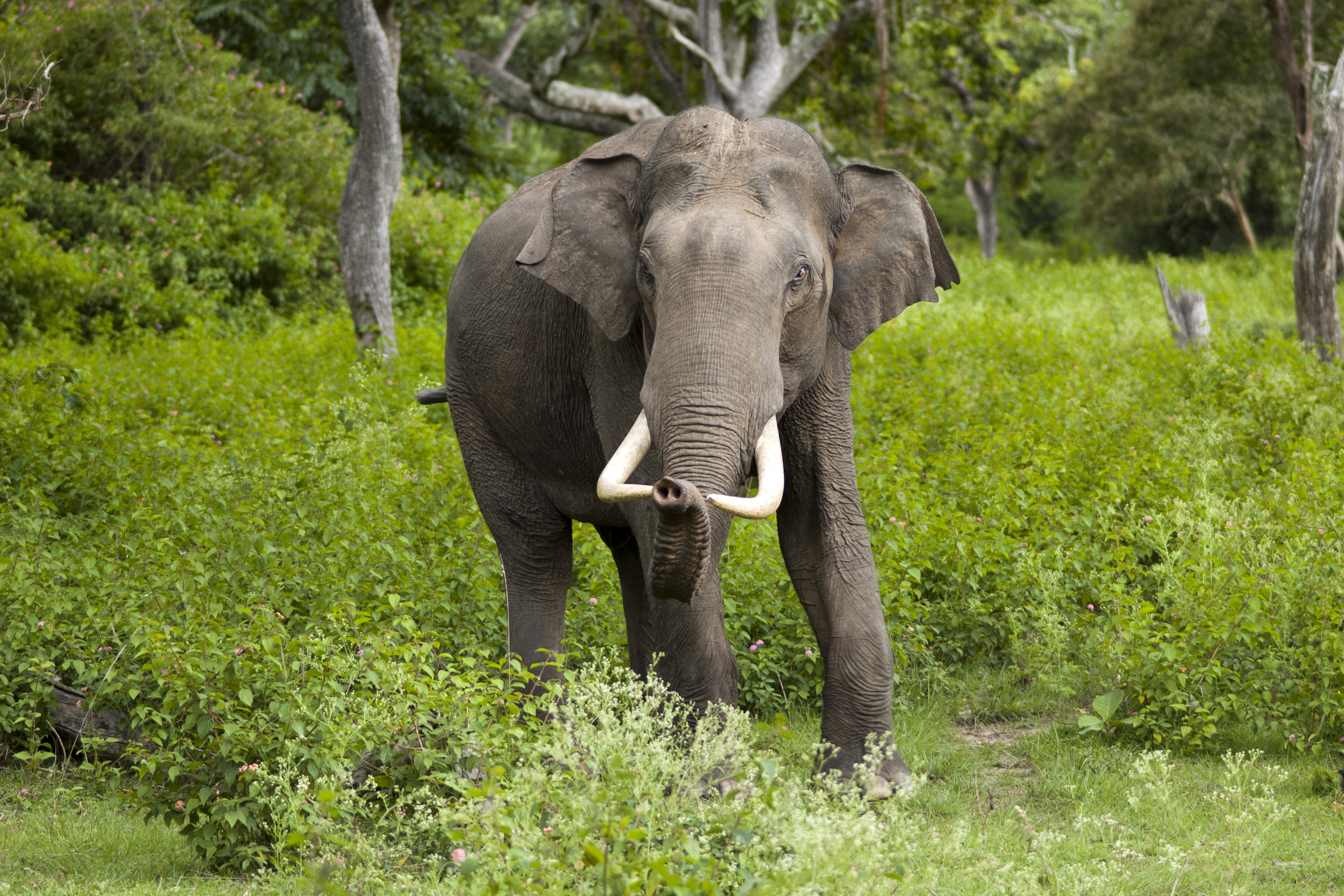
male

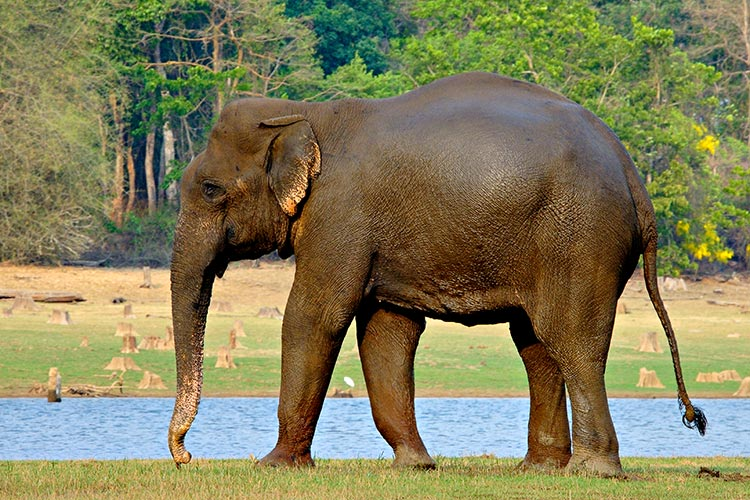
female

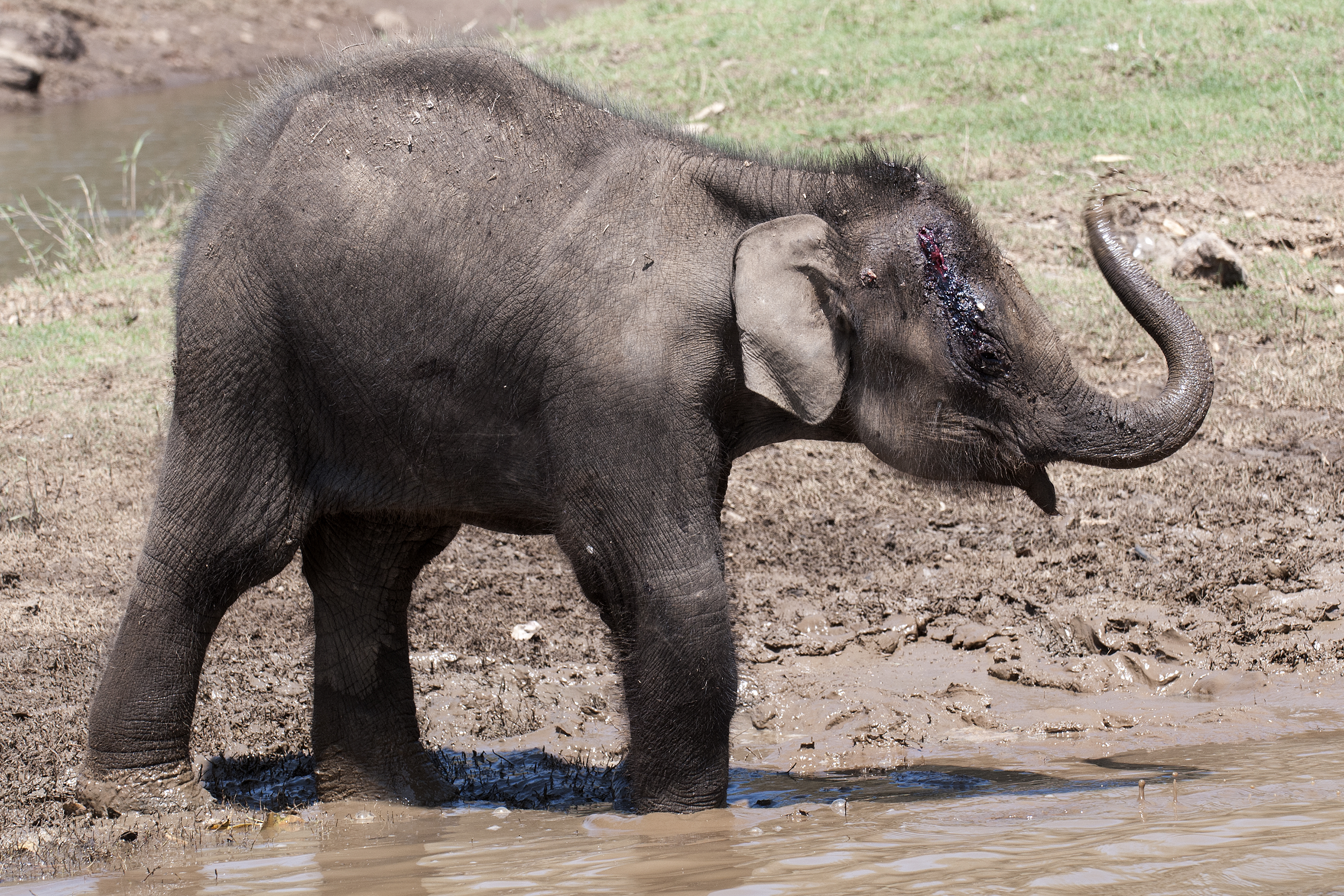
calf

== Order: Rodentia ==
=== Family: Hystricidae ===
==== Genus: Hystrix ====
===== Species: Hystrix indica (Indian crested porcupine / മുള്ളൻ പന്നി) =====
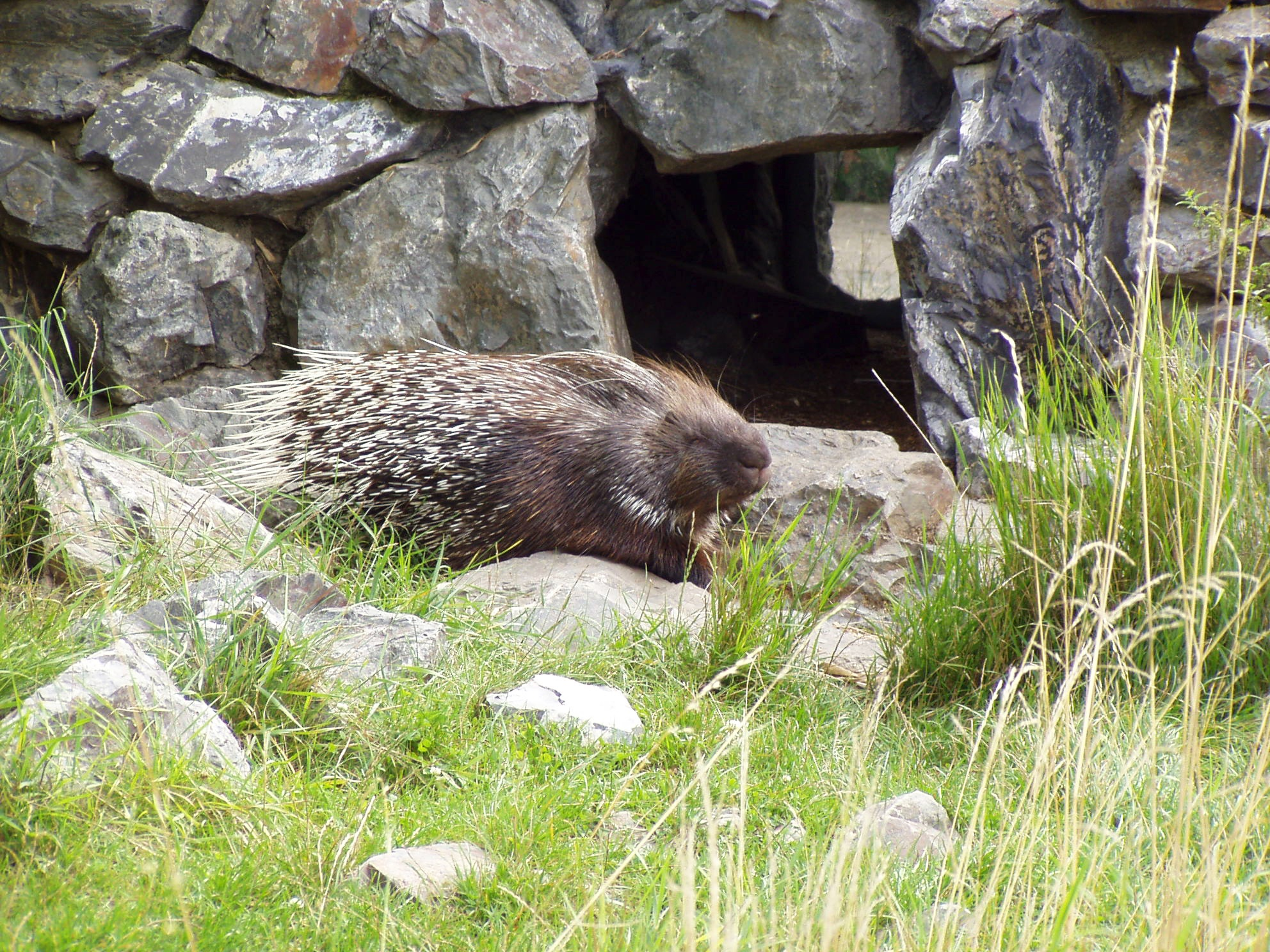

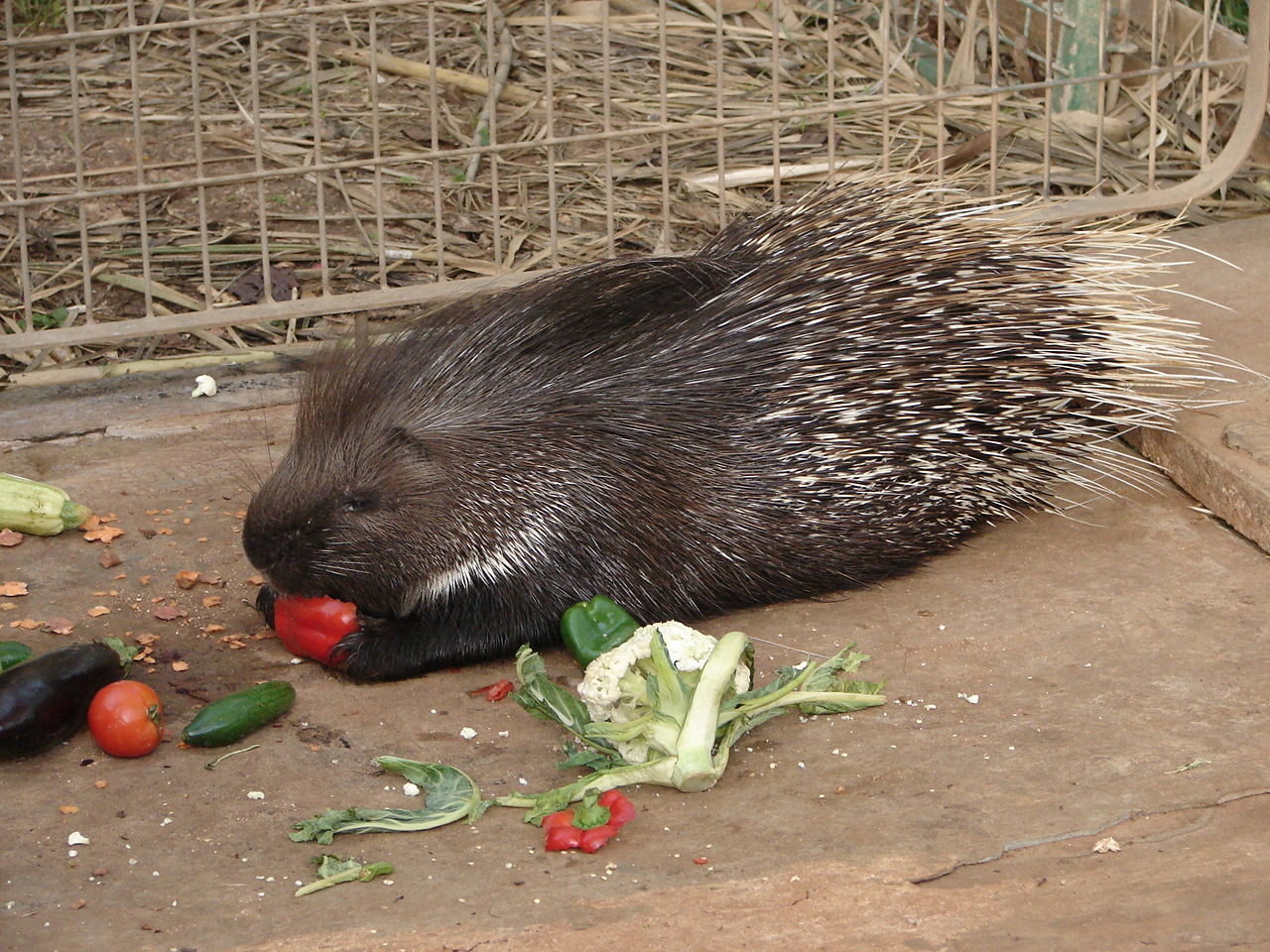

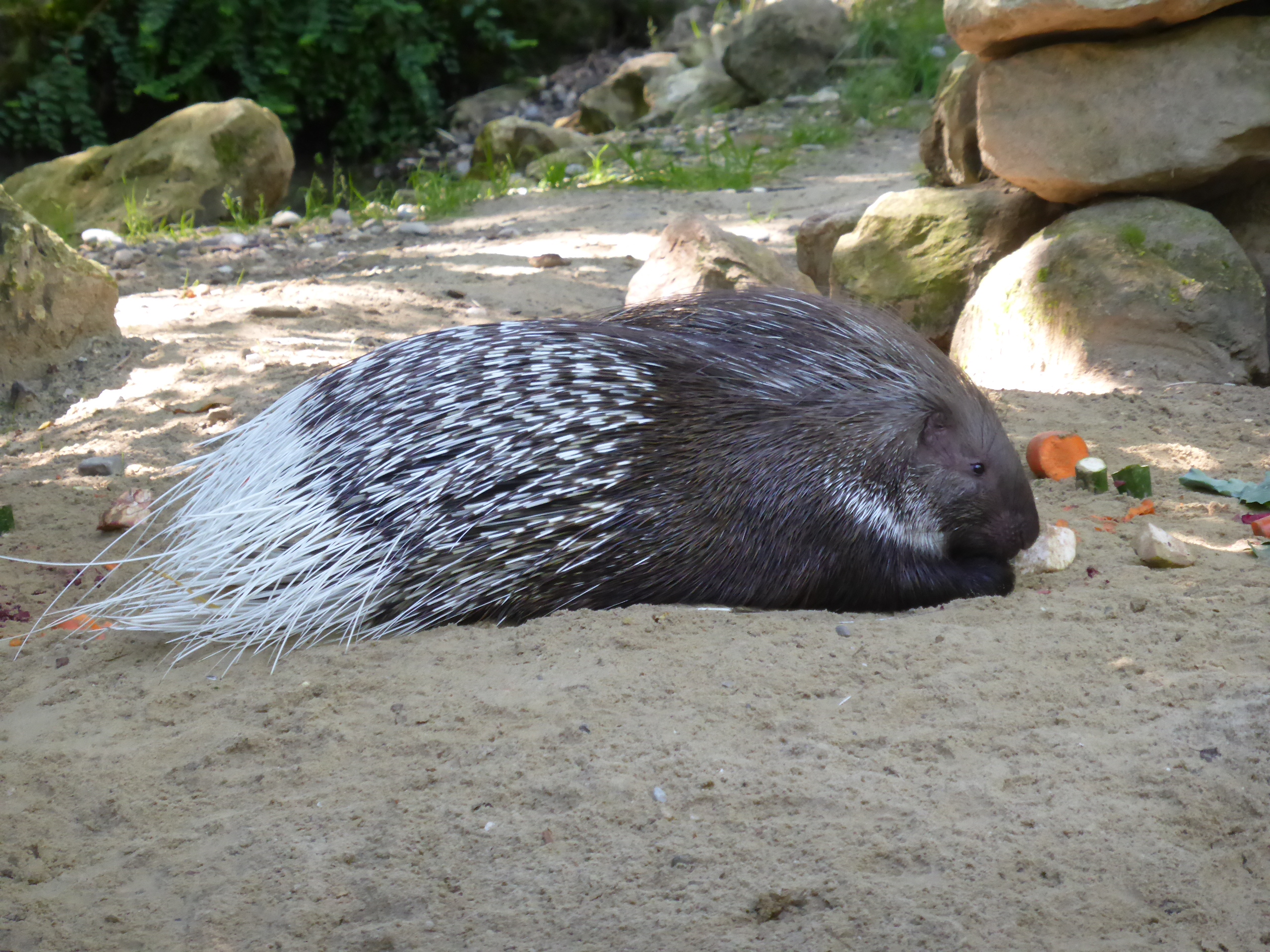

=== Family: Muridae ===
==== Genus: Bandicota ====
===== Species: Bandicota bengalensis (lesser bandicoot rat / തുരപ്പനെലി) =====
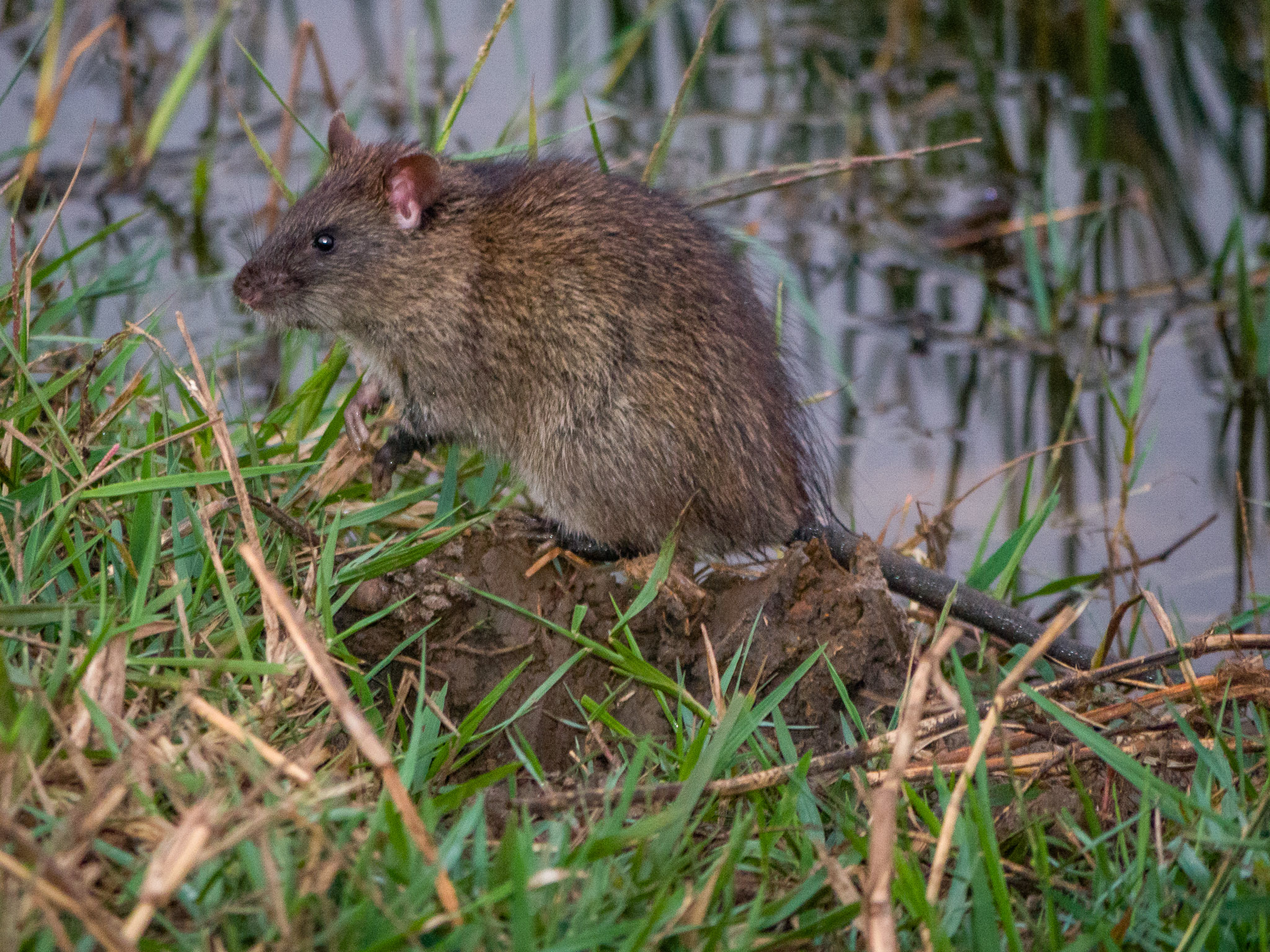

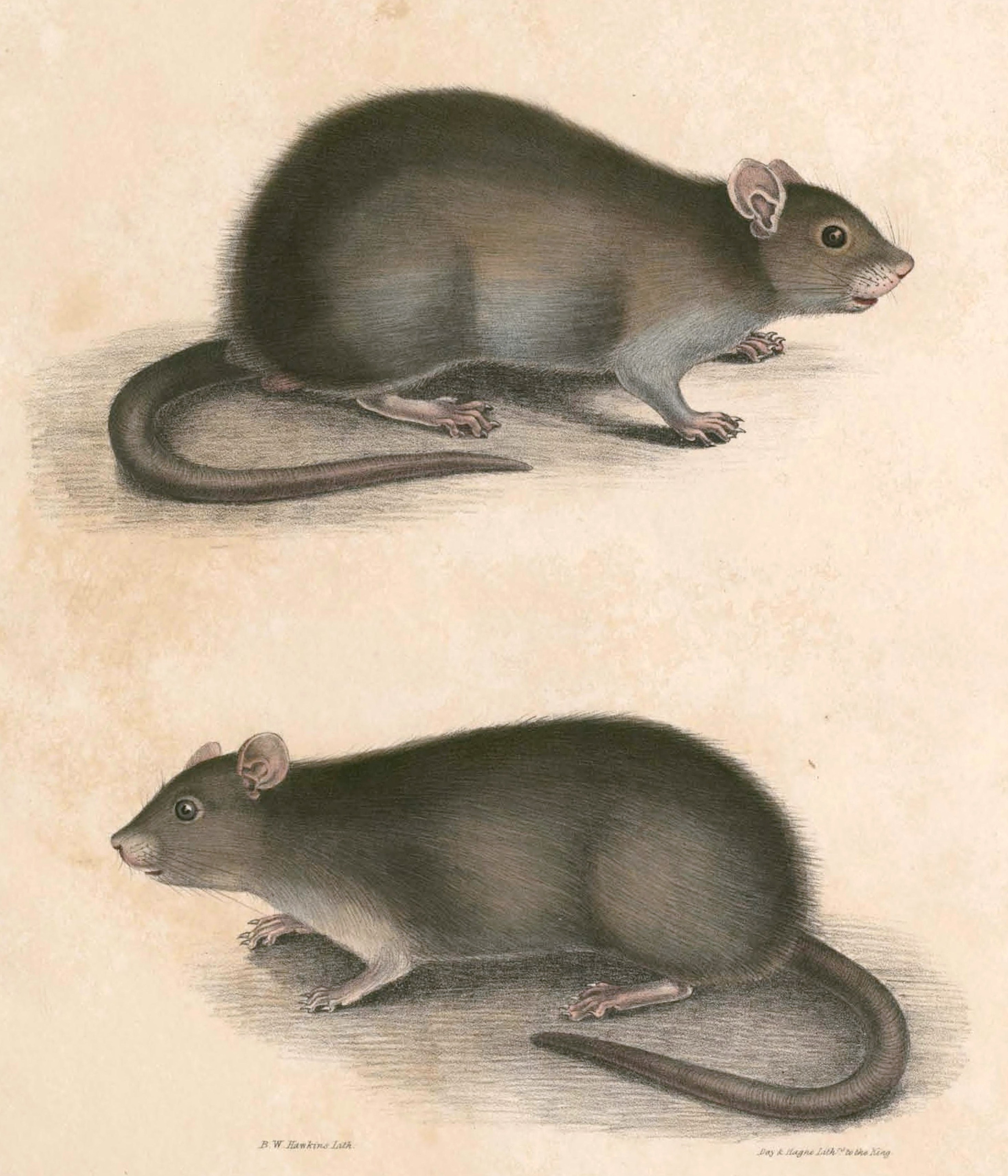
illustration

===== Species: Bandicota indica (greater bandicoot rat / പെരുച്ചാഴി) =====
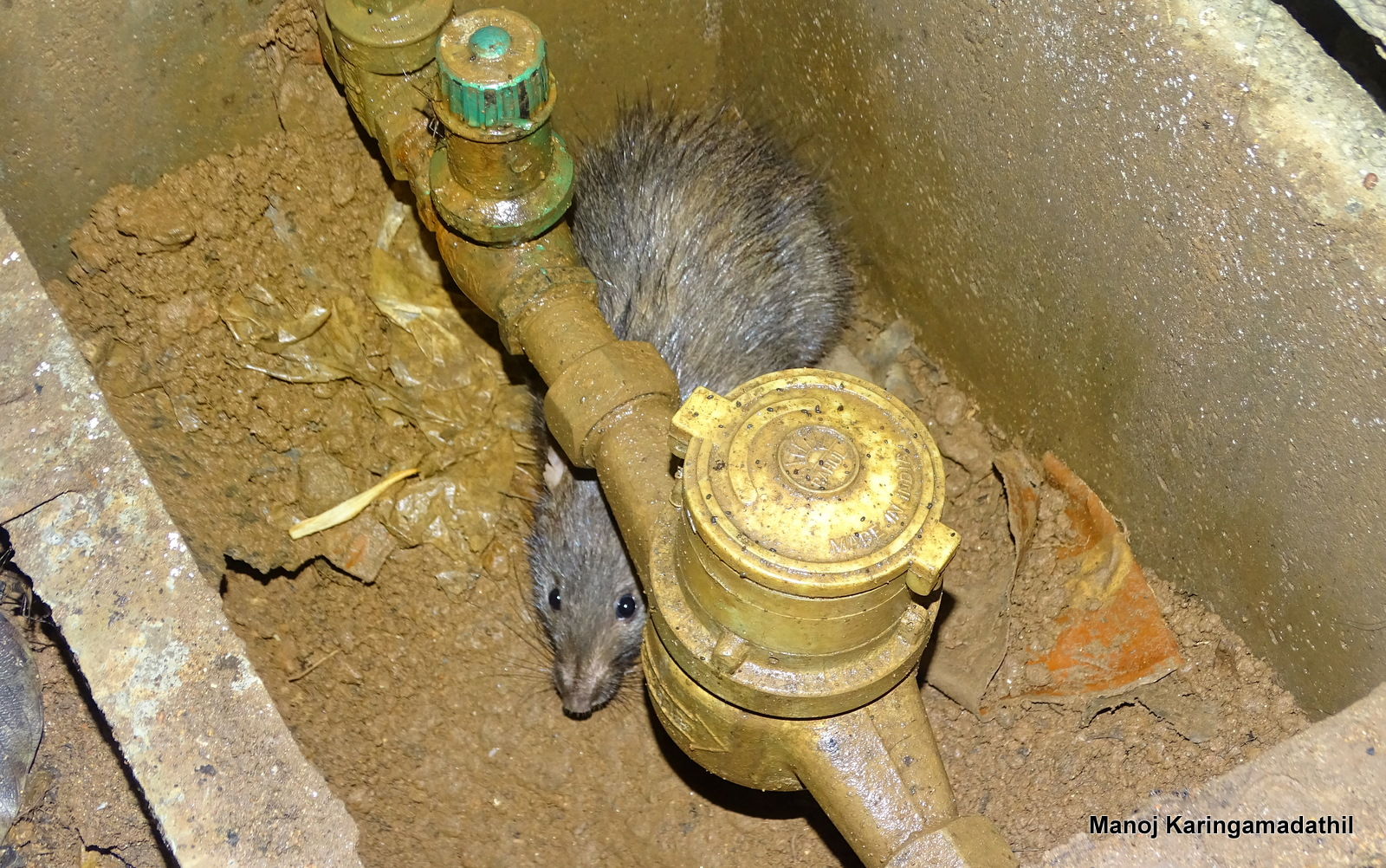

==== Genus: Golunda ====
===== Species: Golunda ellioti (Indian bush rat / ഗോളുണ്ട എലി) =====
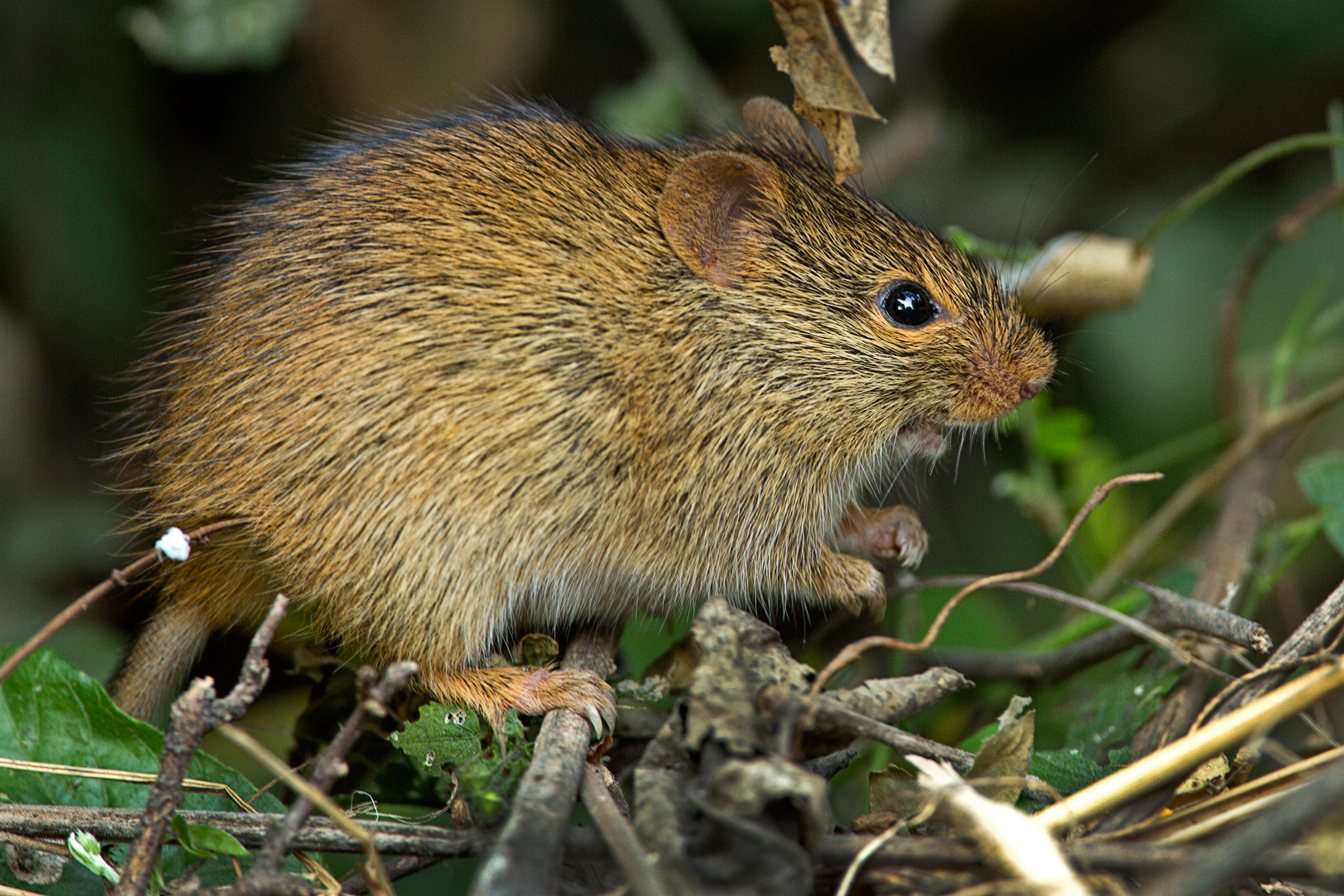

==== Genus: Madromys ====
===== Species: Madromys blanfordi (Blanford's rat / വെള്ളവാലൻ എലി) =====
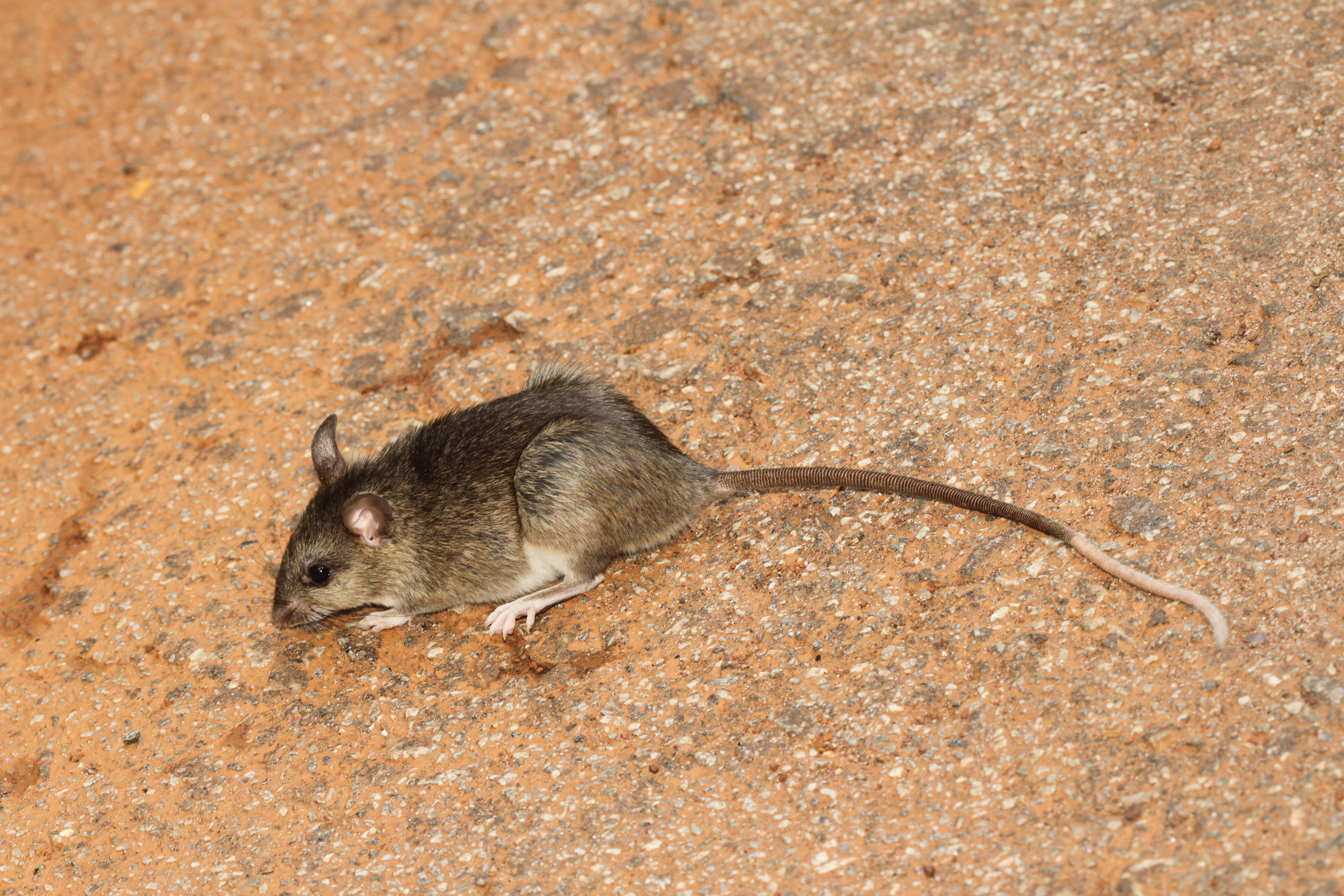

==== Genus: Mus ====
===== Species: Mus musculus (house mouse / ചുണ്ടെലി) =====
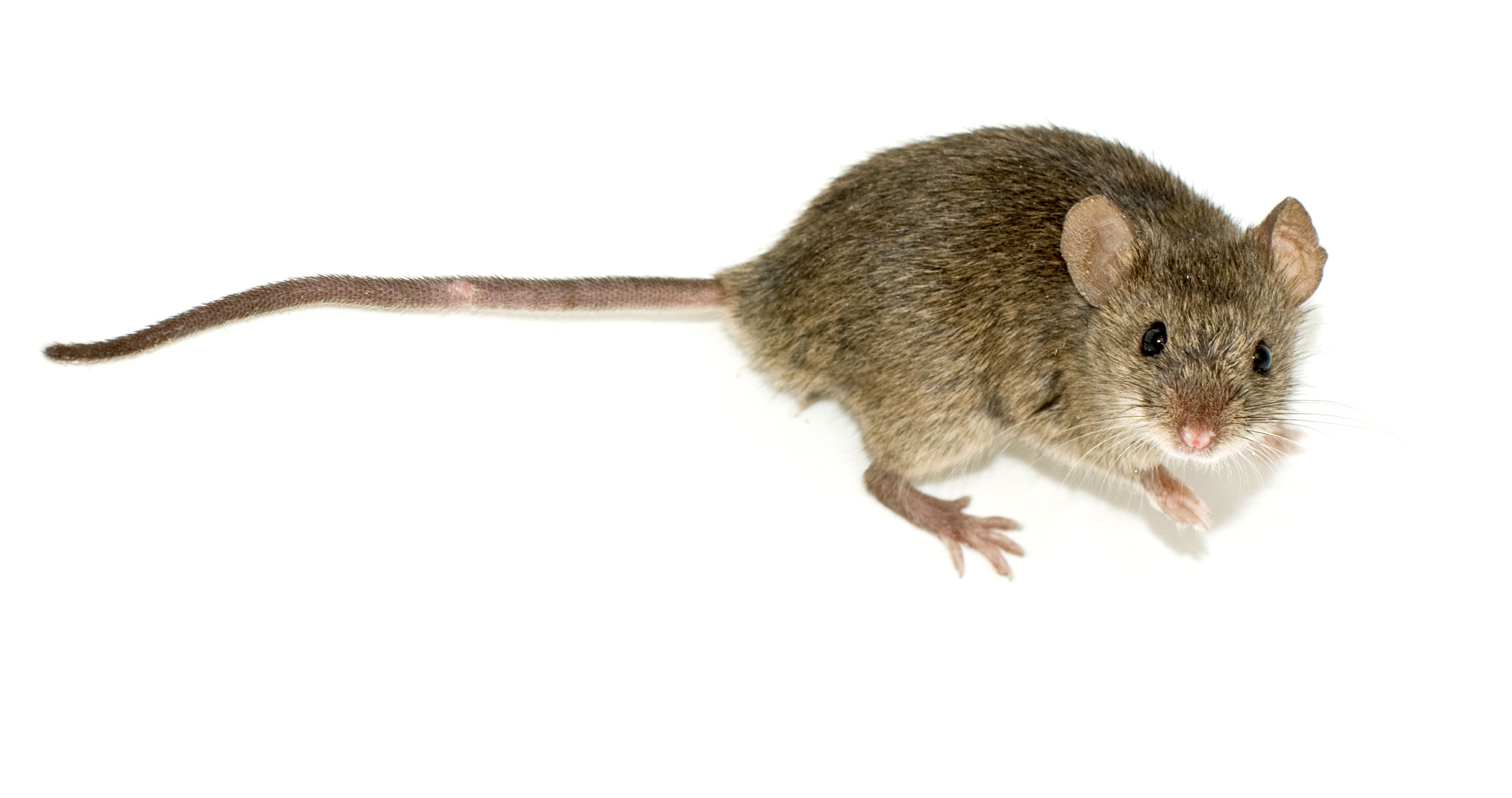

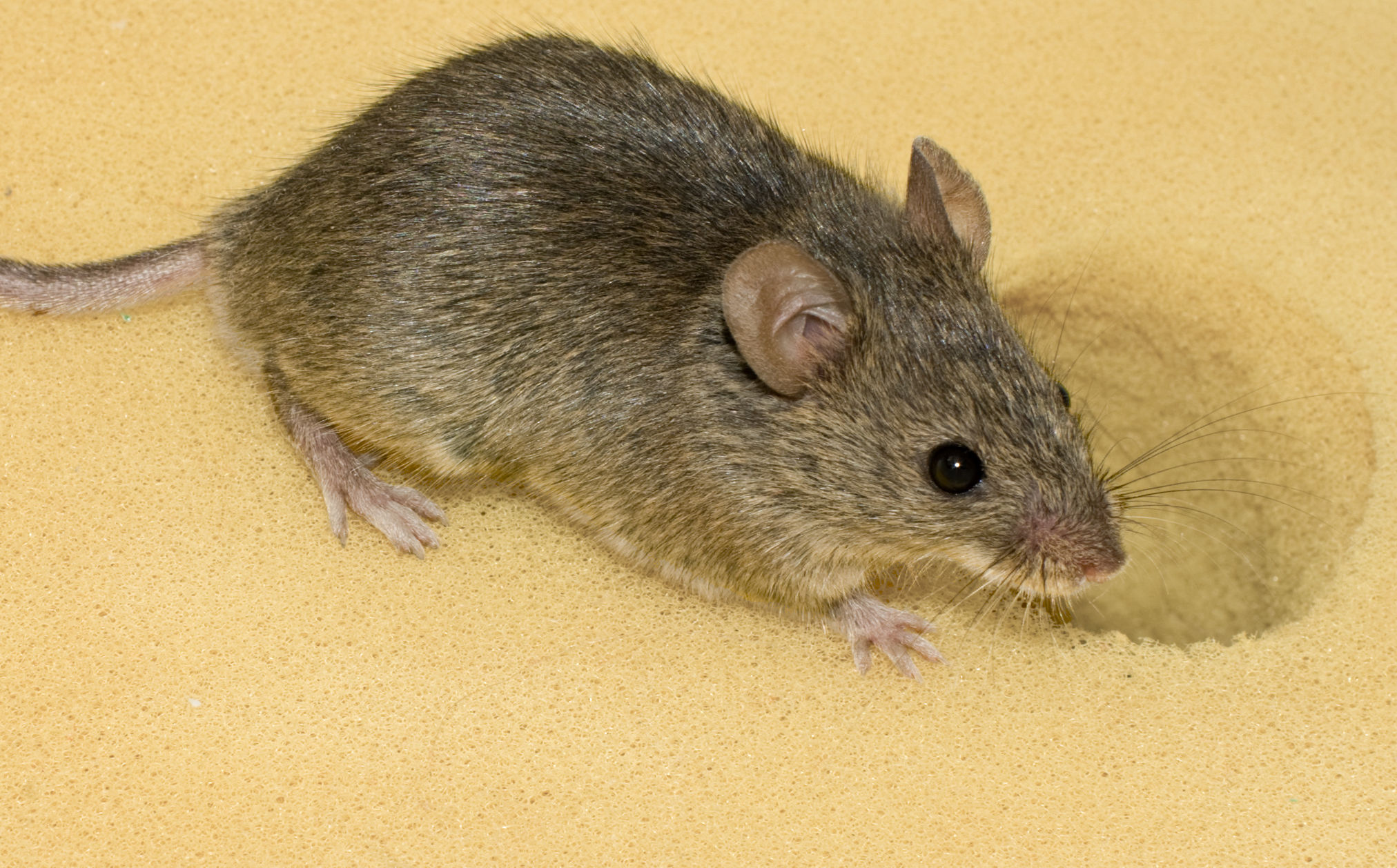

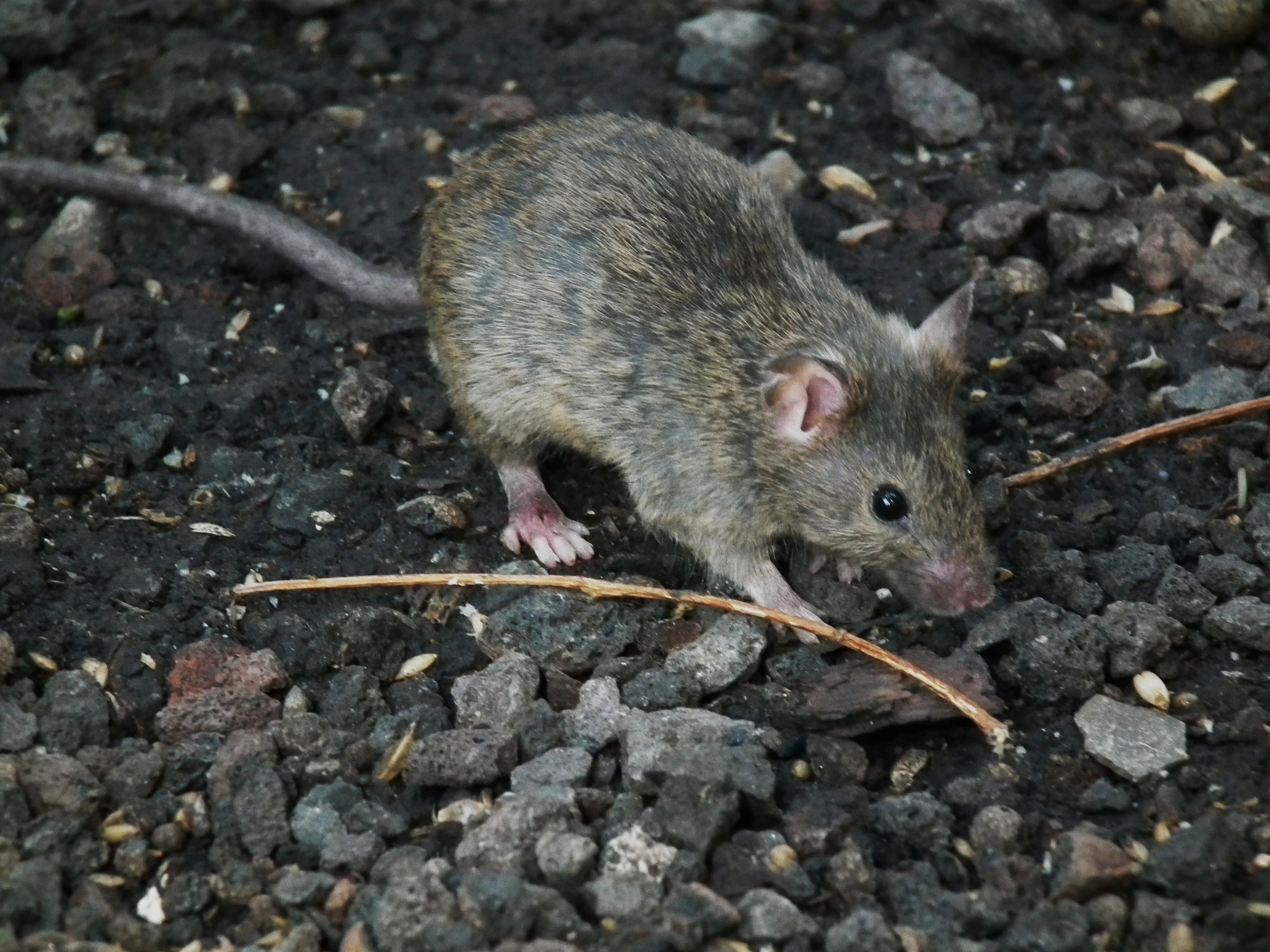

==== Genus: Rattus ====
===== Species: Rattus norvegicus (brown rat / തവിടൻ എലി) =====
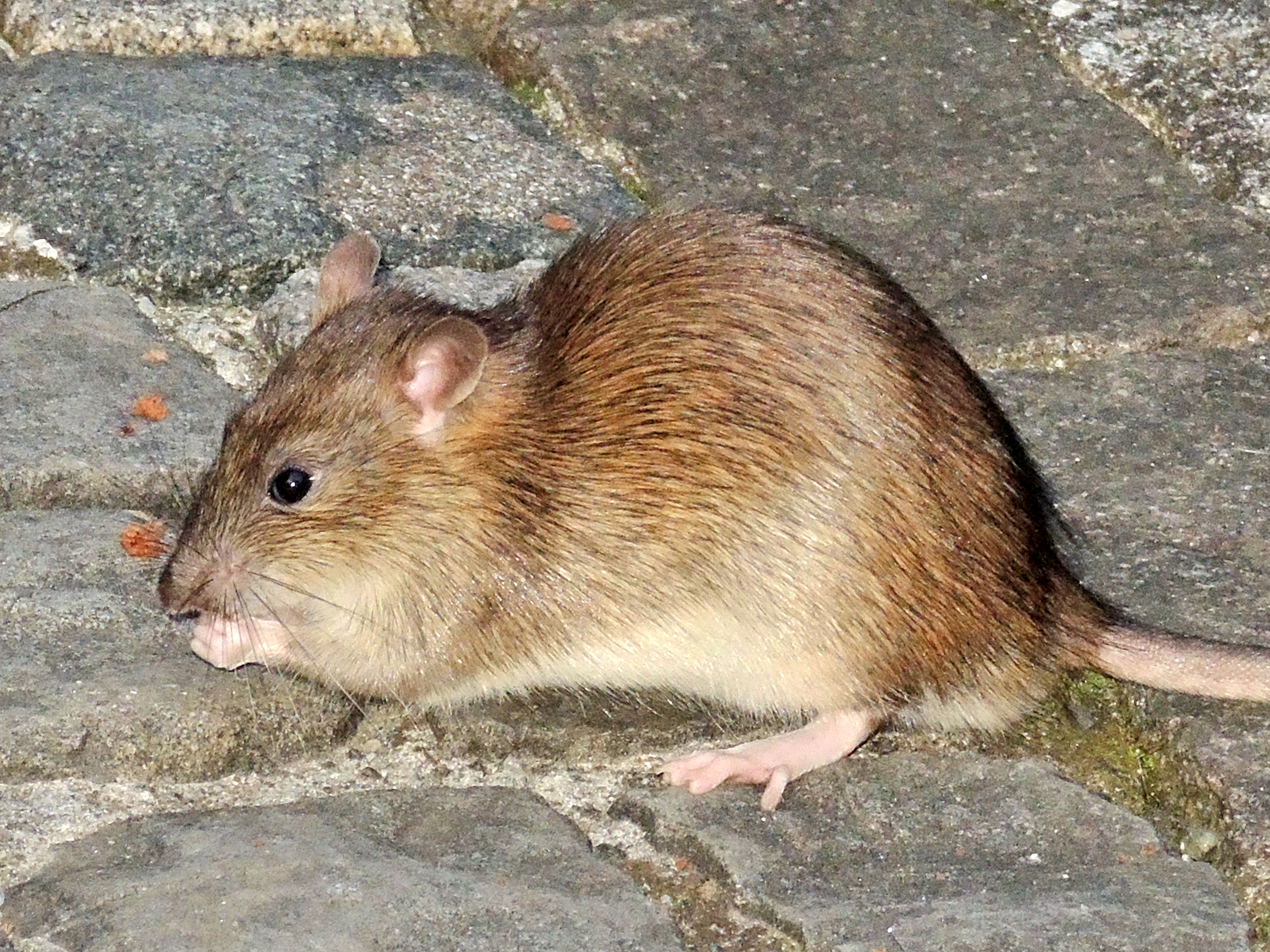

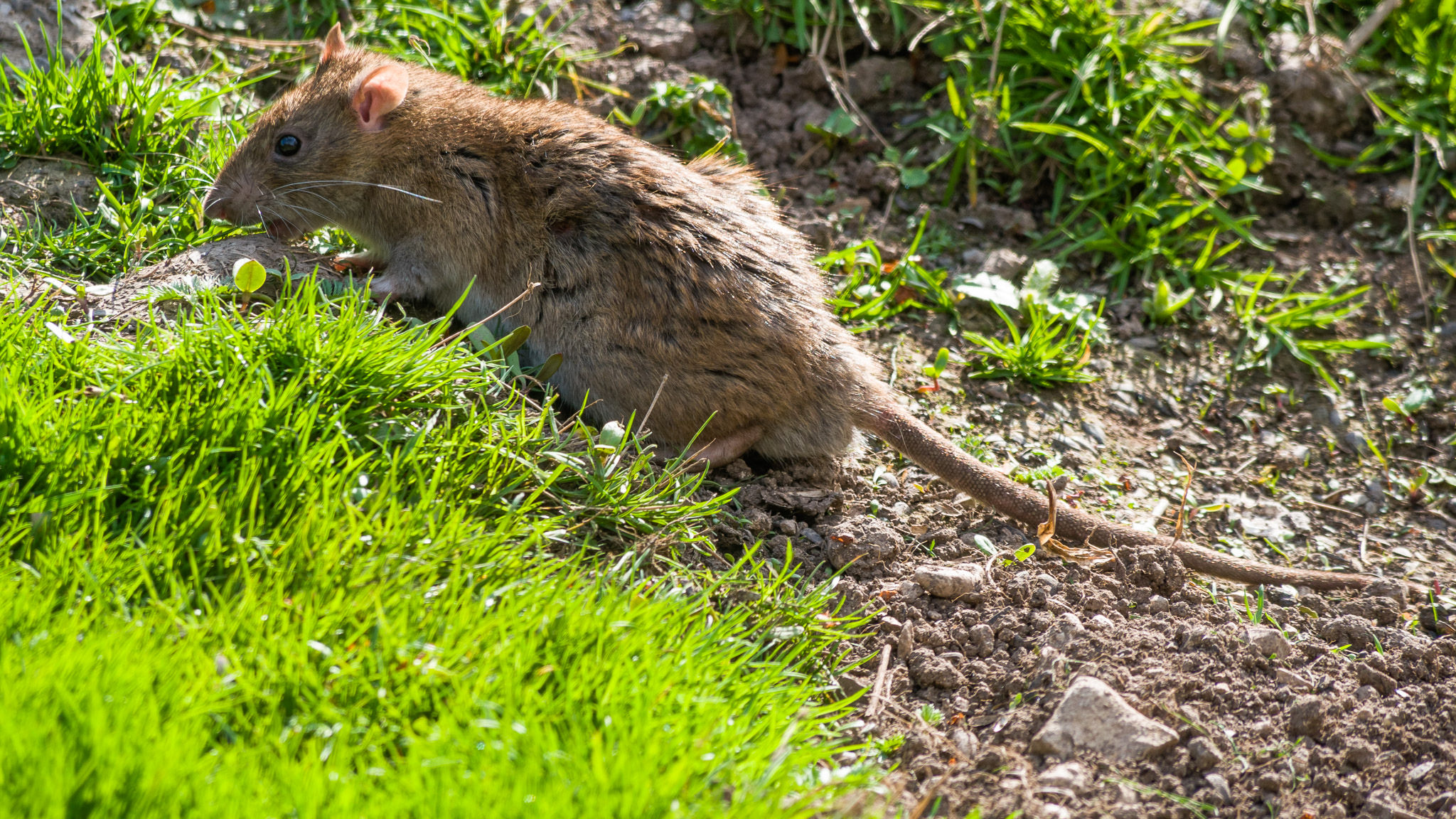

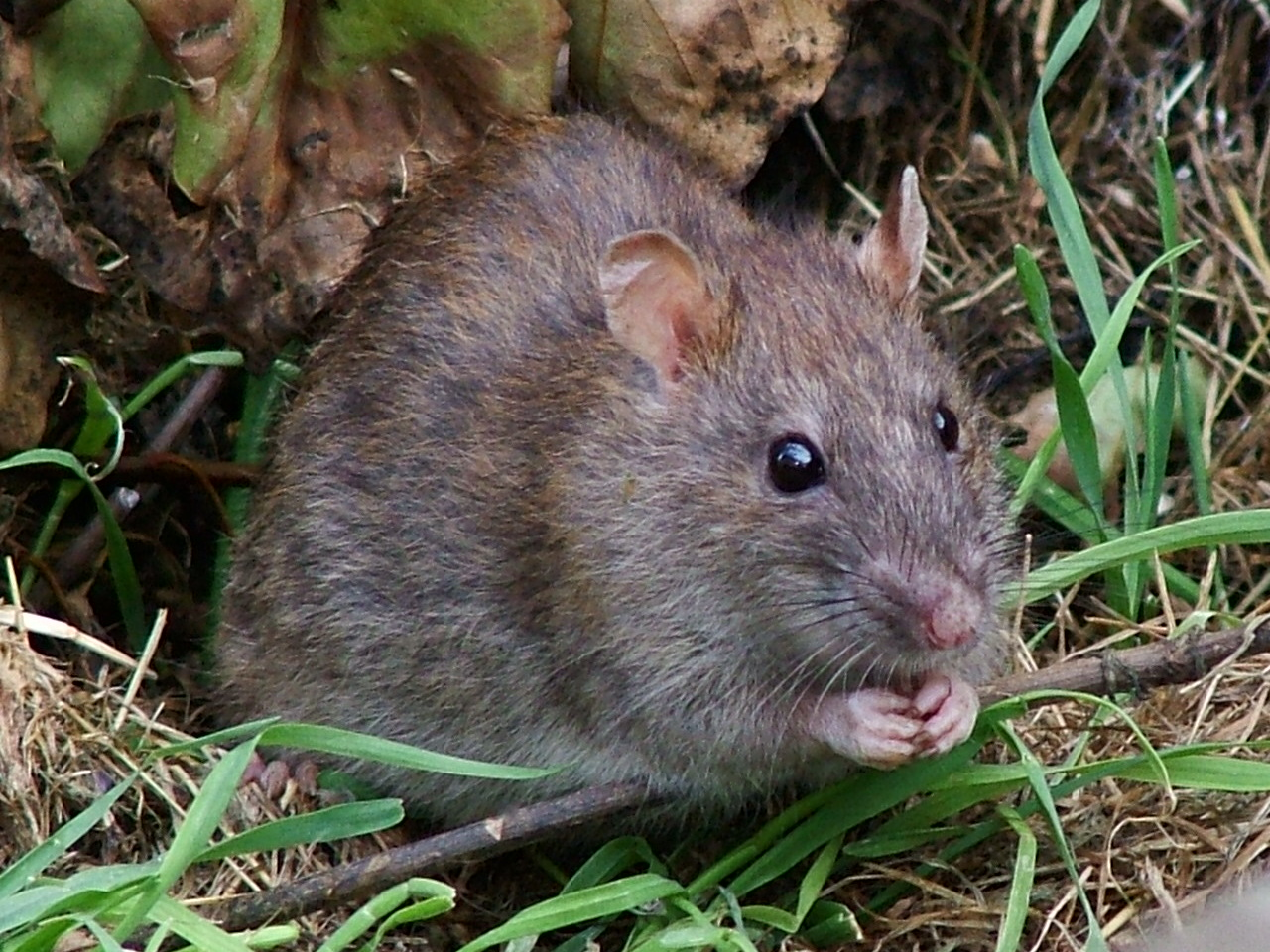

===== Species: Rattus rattus (black rat / കറുത്ത എലി) =====
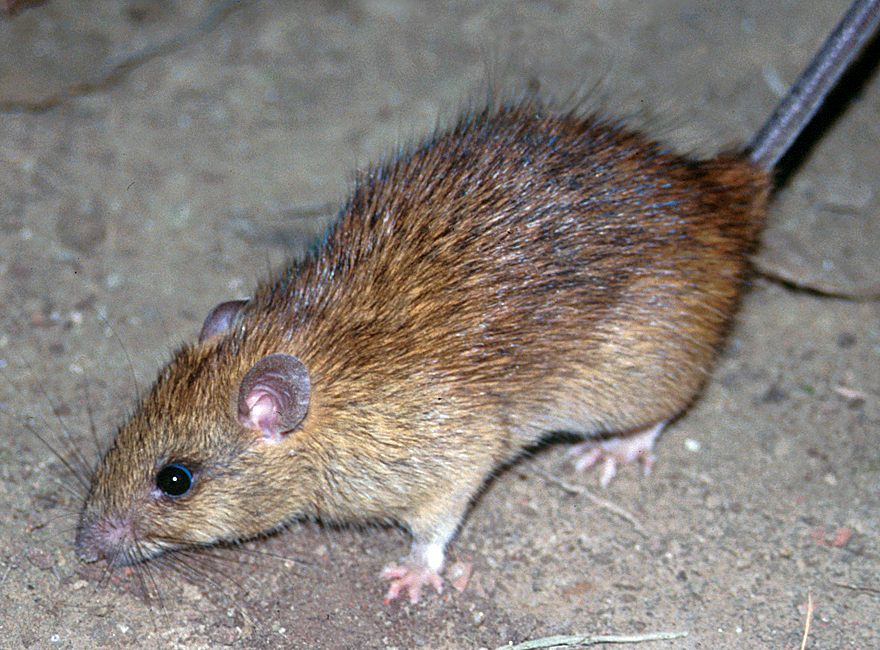

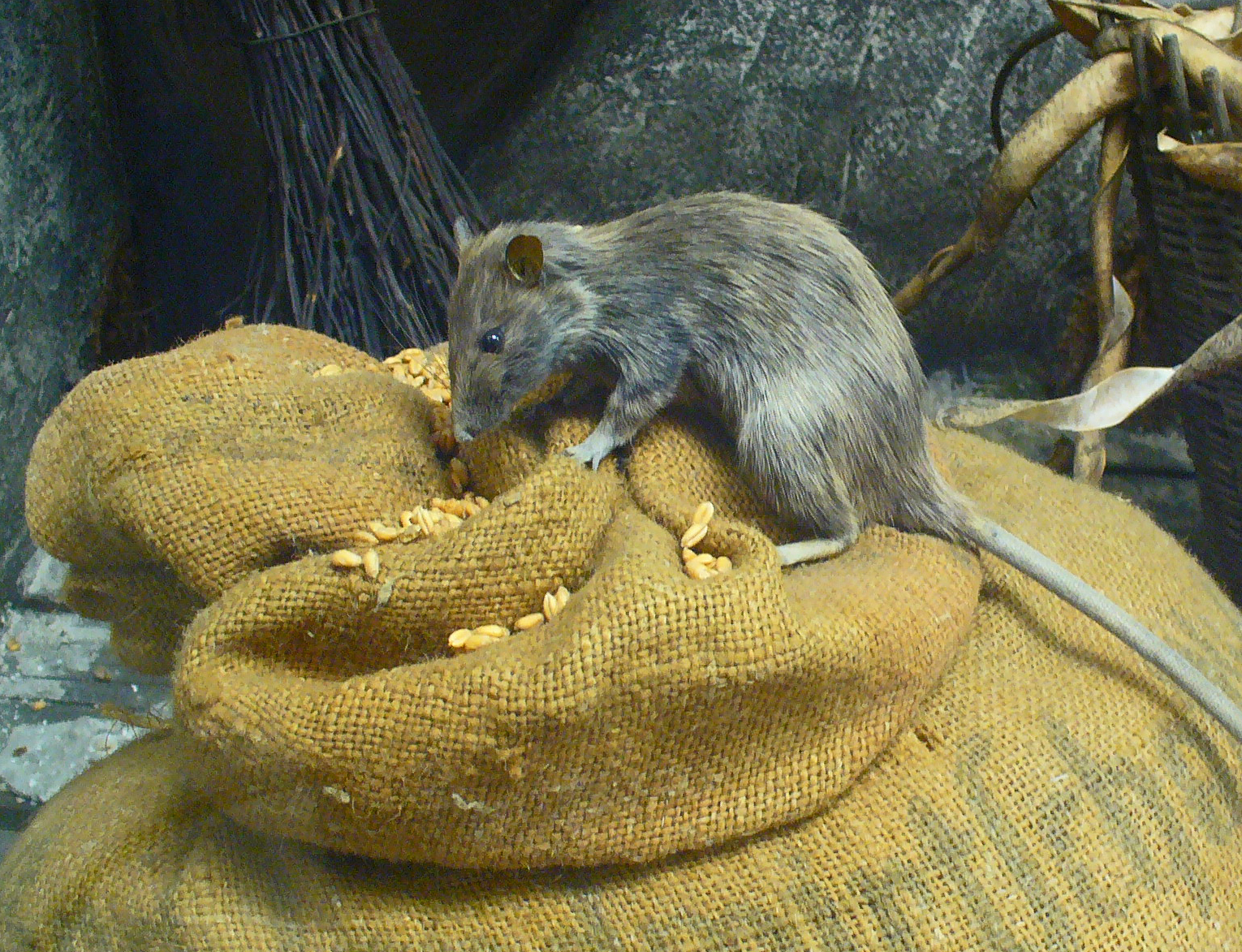

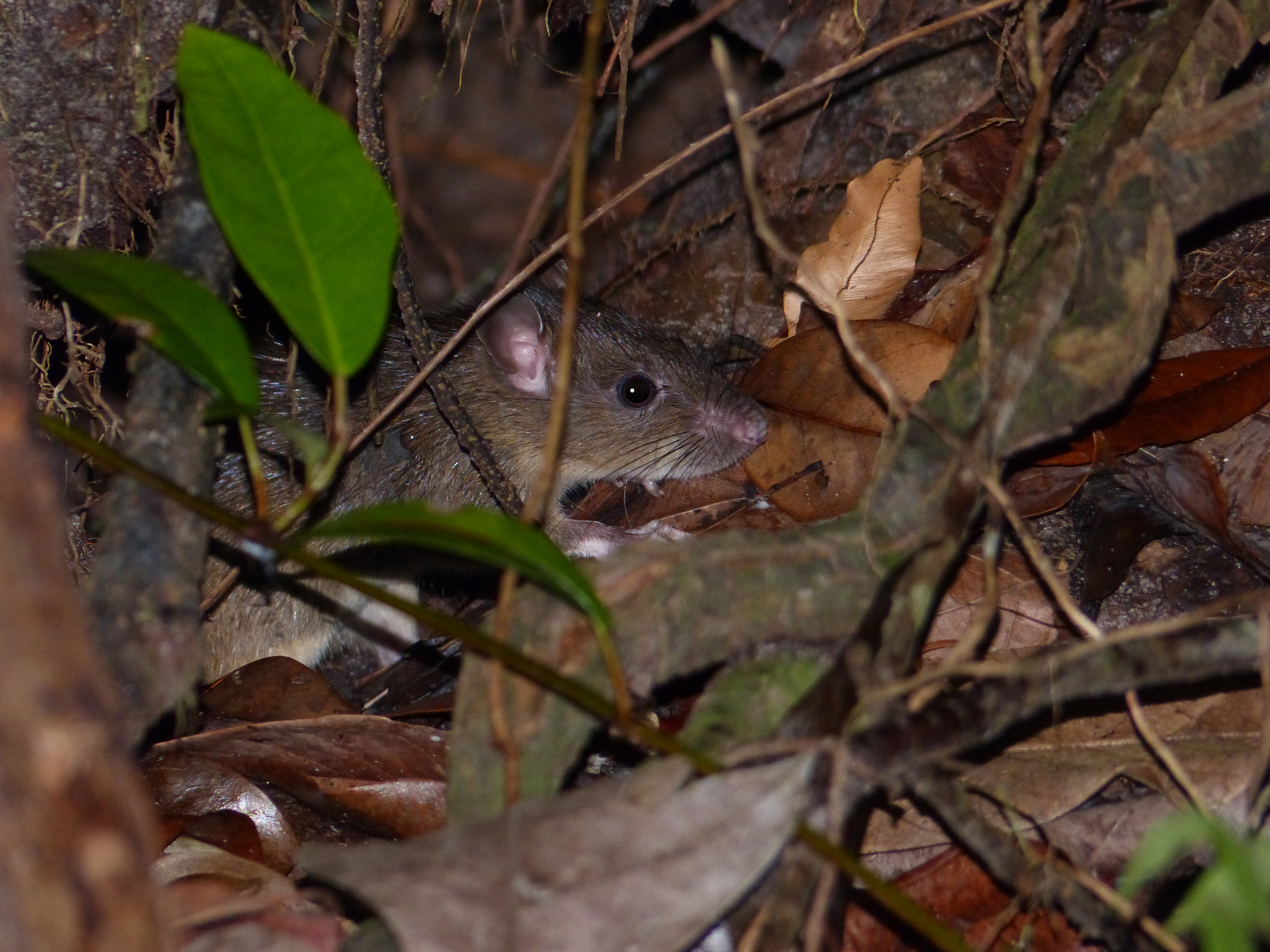

===== Species: Rattus satarae (Sahyadris forest rat / സഹ്യാദ്രി കാട്ടെലി) =====
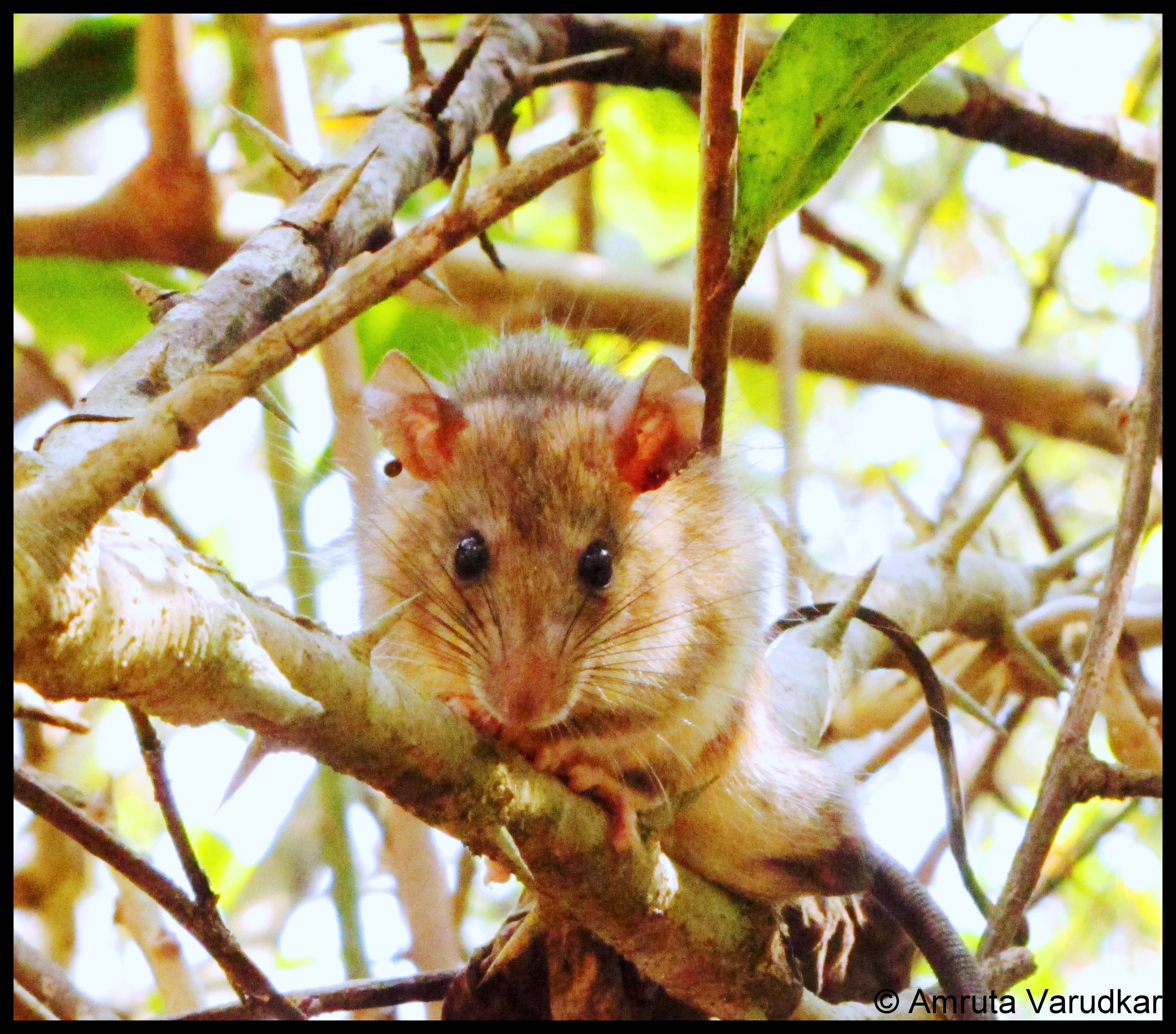

==== Genus: Tatera ====
===== Species: Tatera indica (Indian gerbil / കംഗാരു എലി) =====
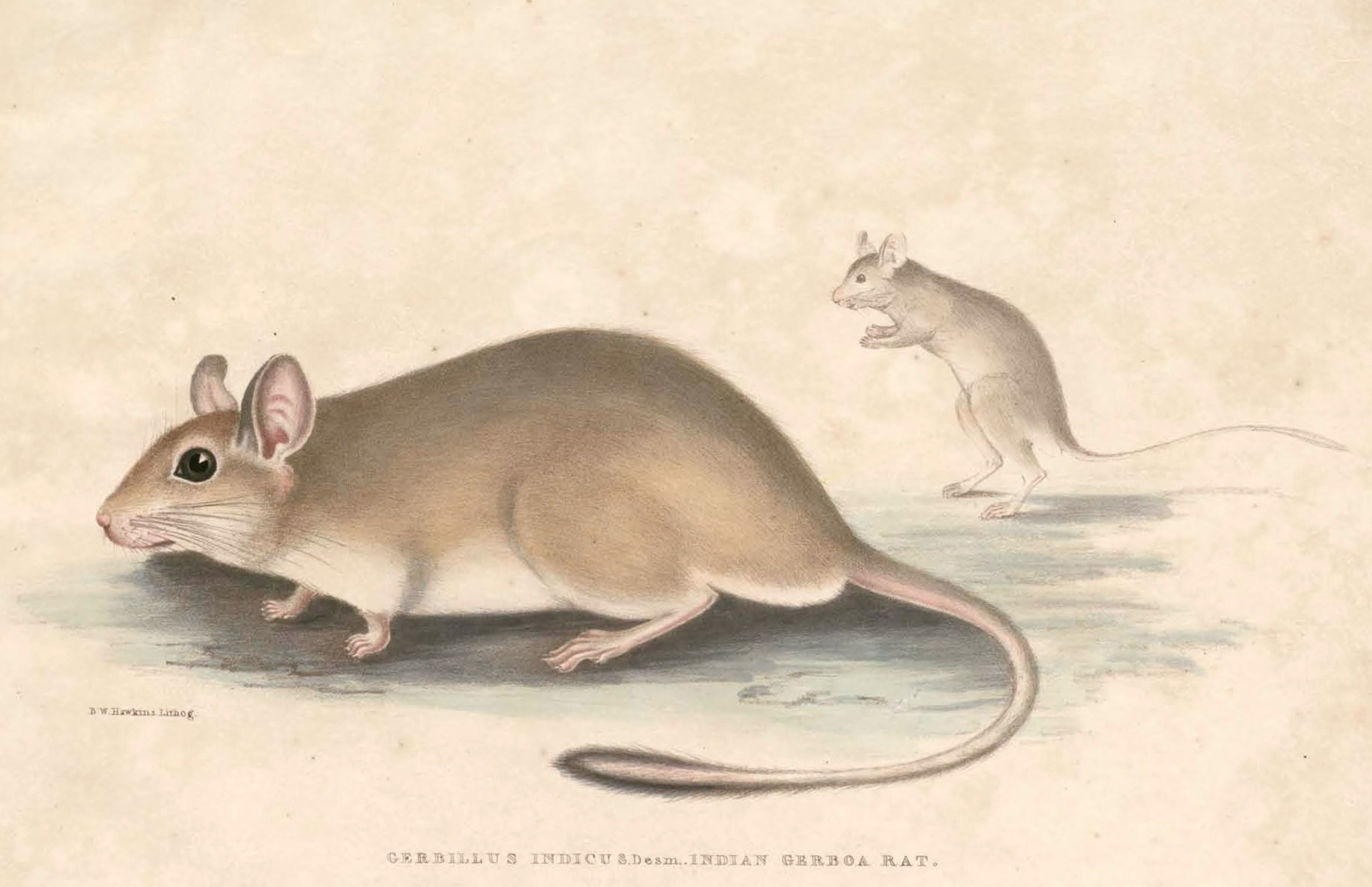

==== Genus: Vandeleuria ====
===== Species: Vandeleuria nilagirica (Nilgiri long-tailed tree mouse / വാലൻ ചുണ്ടെലി) =====
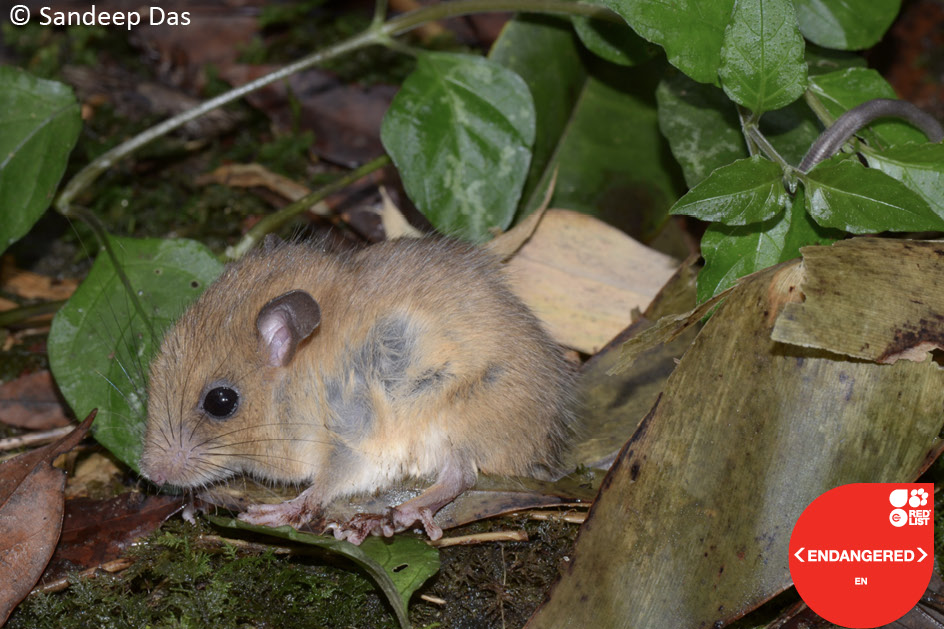

=== Family: Platacanthomyidae ===
==== Genus: Platacanthomys ====
===== Species: Platacanthomys lasiurus (Malabar spiny dormouse / മുള്ളെലി) =====
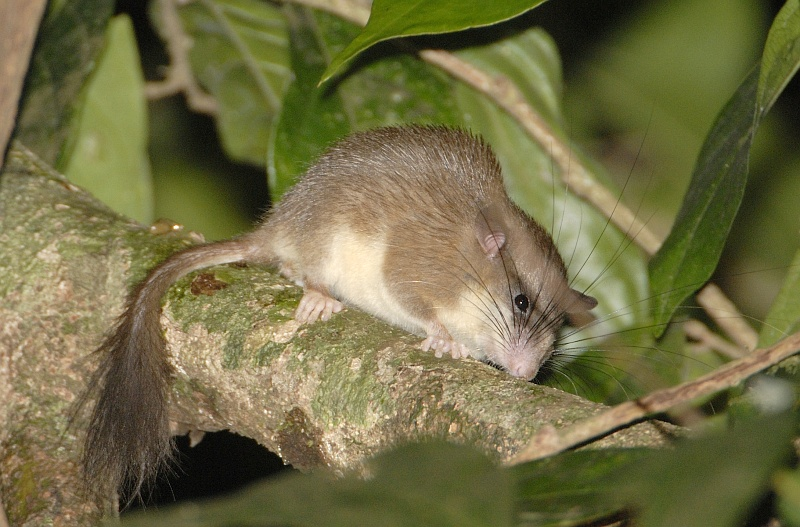

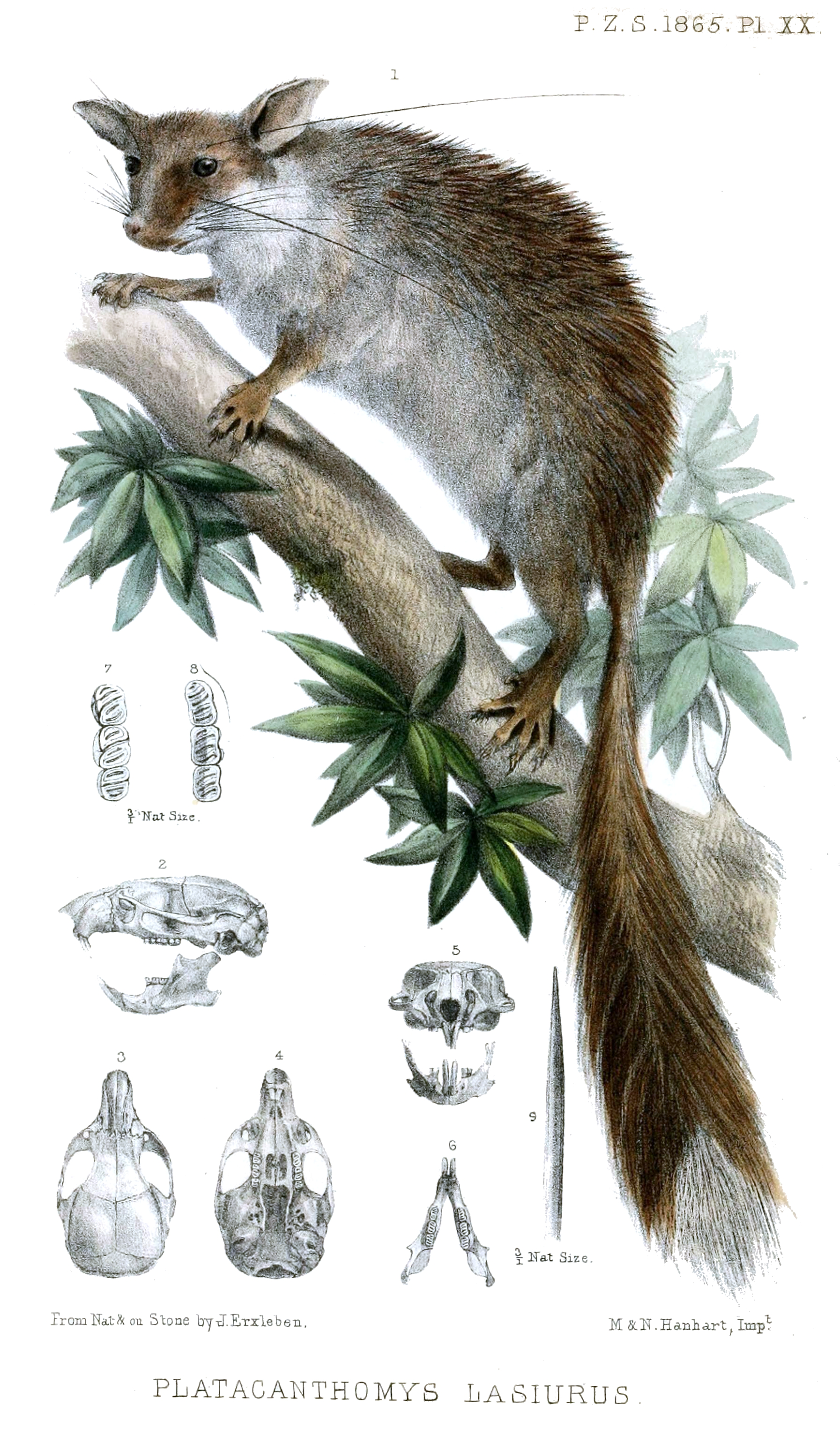

=== Family: Sciuridae ===
==== Genus: Funambulus ====
===== Species: Funambulus palmarum (Indian palm squirrel / അണ്ണാറക്കണ്ണൻ) =====
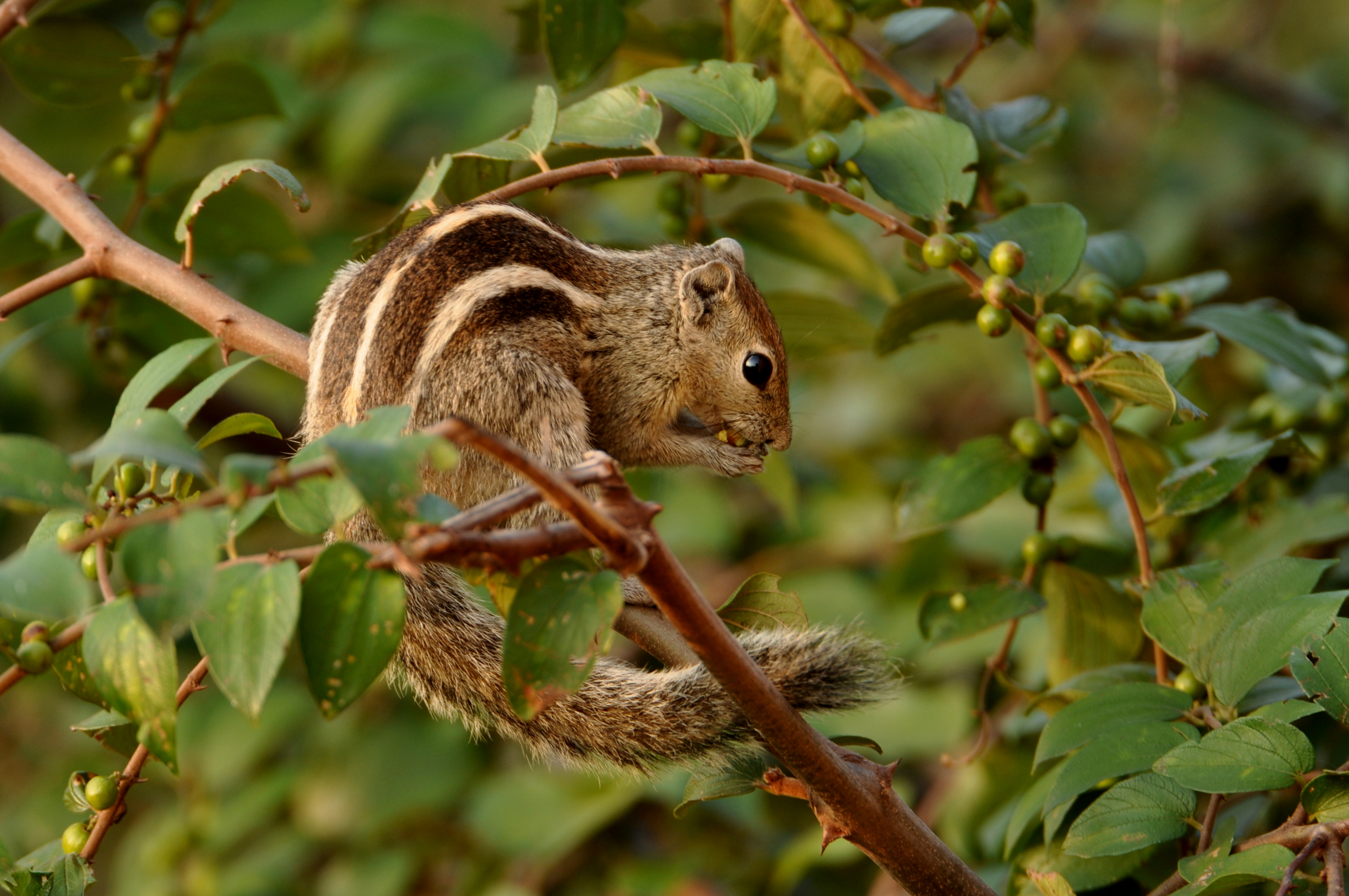

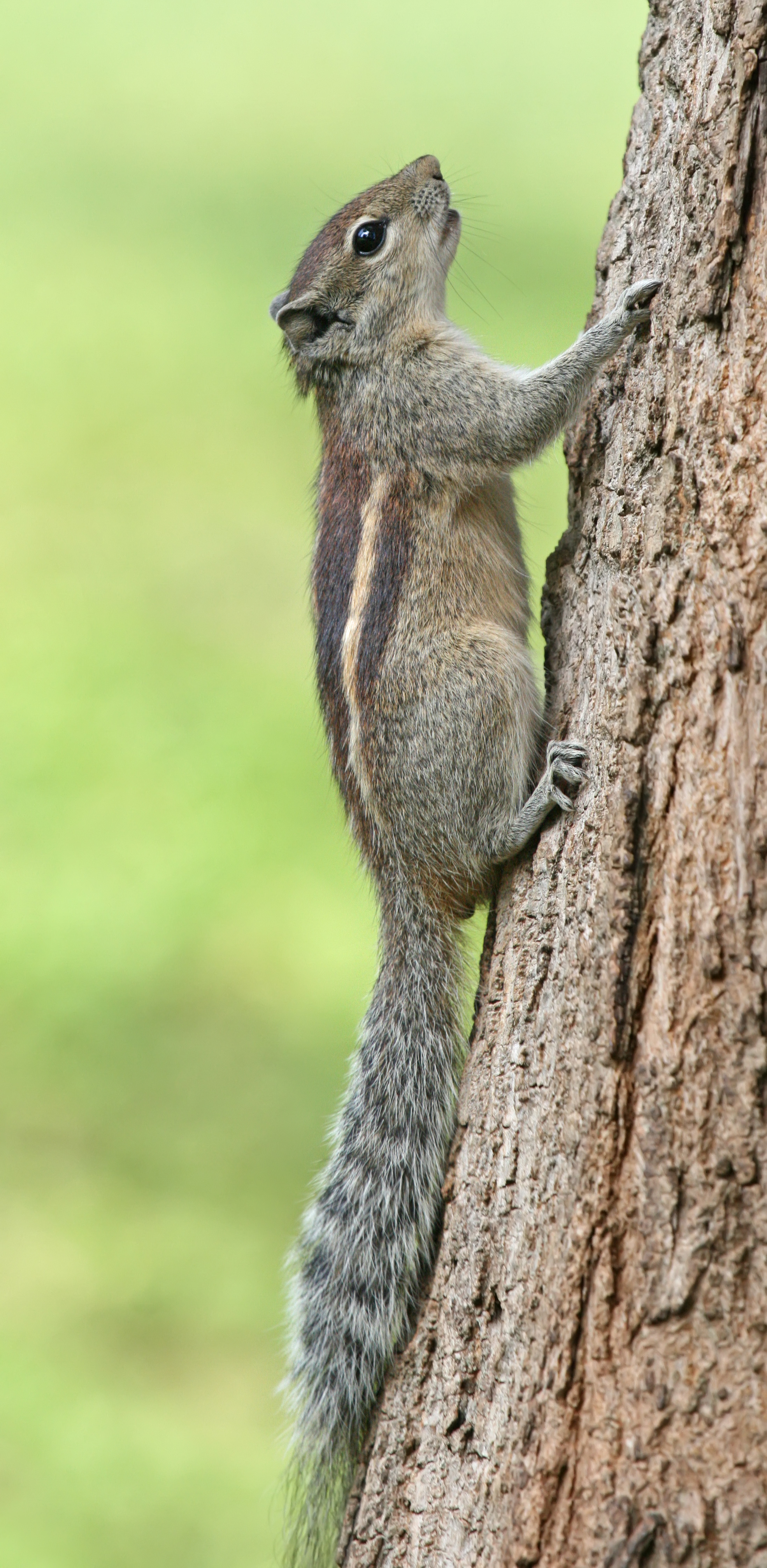

===== Species: Funambulus sublineatus (Nilgiri striped squirrel / കുഞ്ഞൻ അണ്ണാൻ ) =====
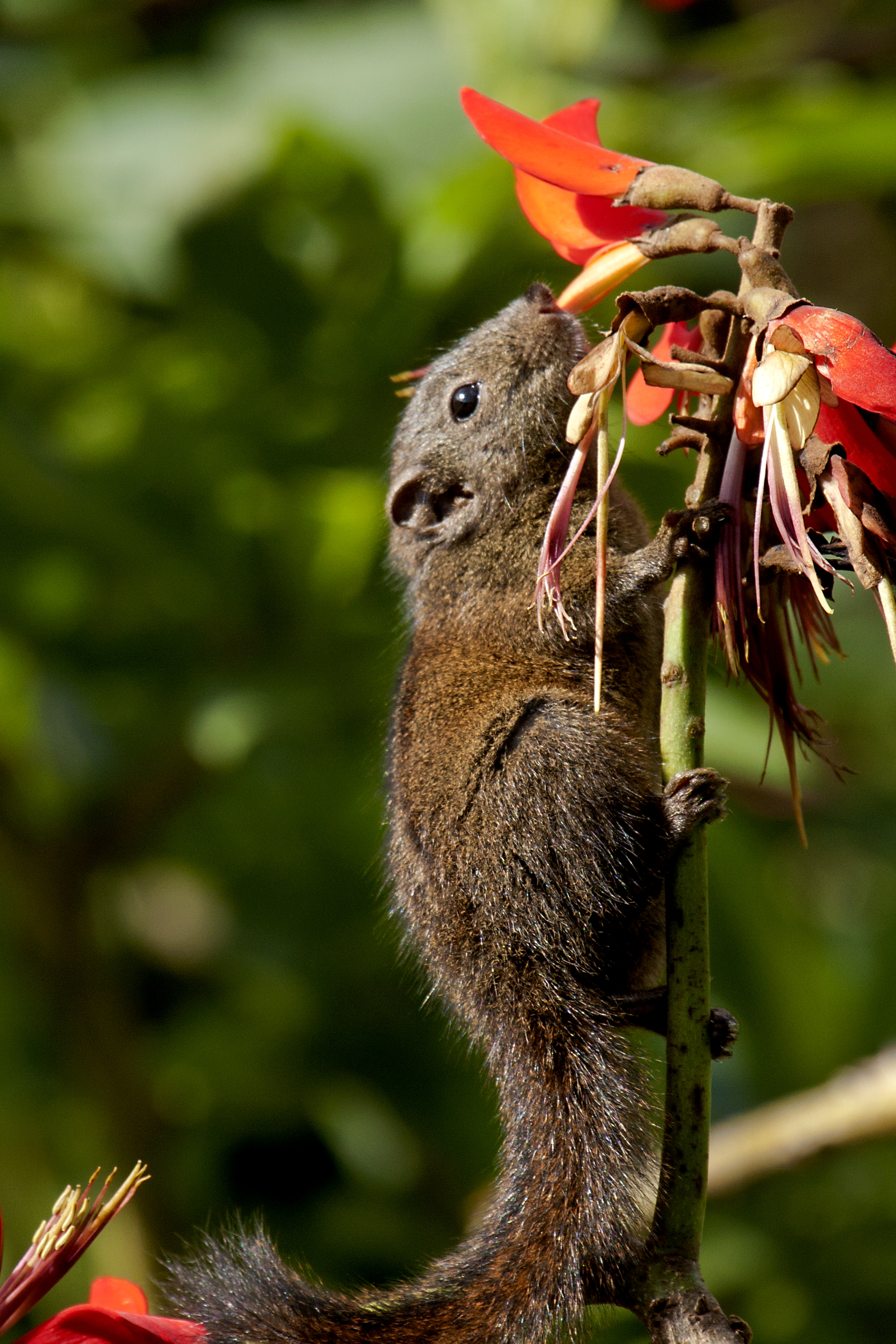

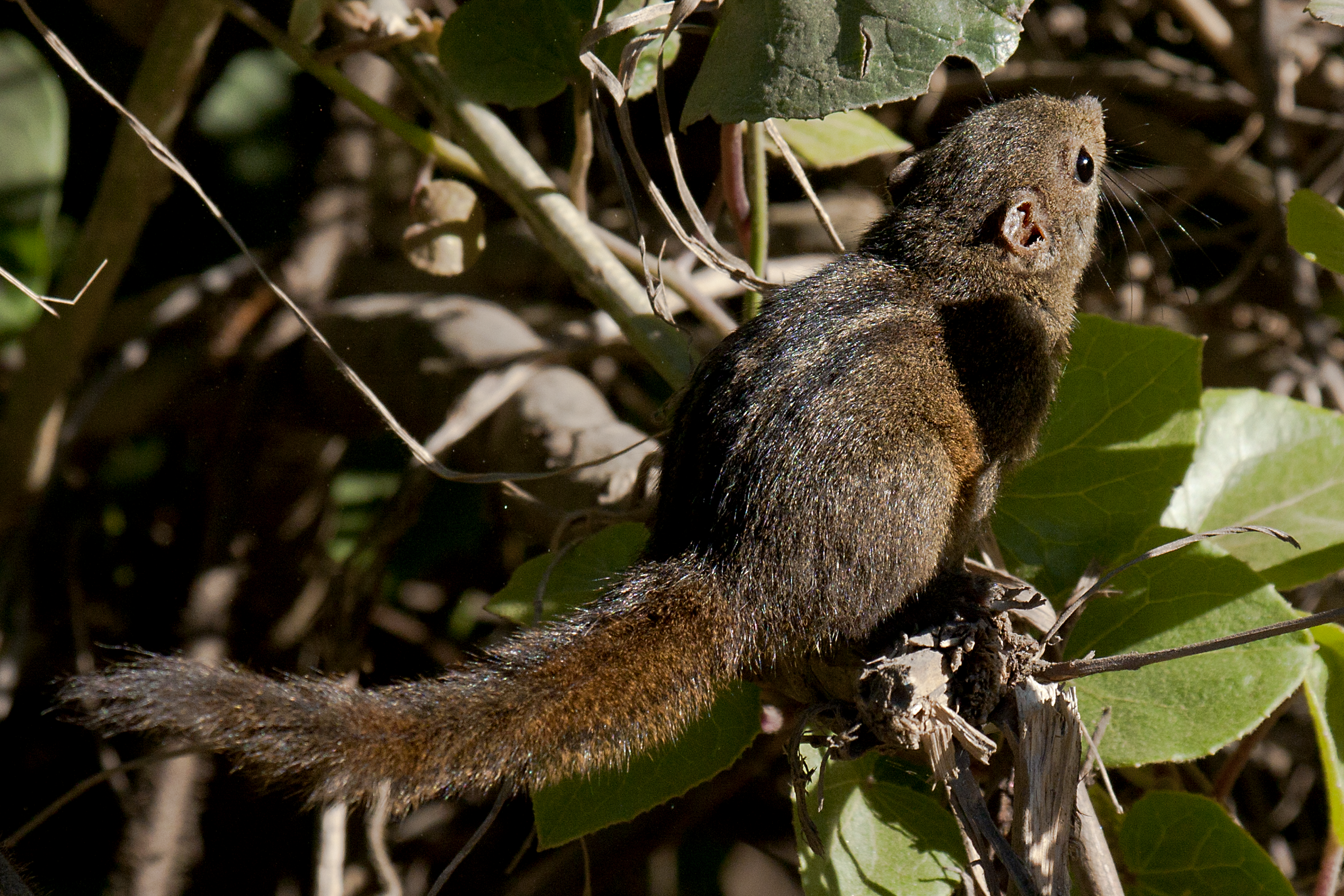

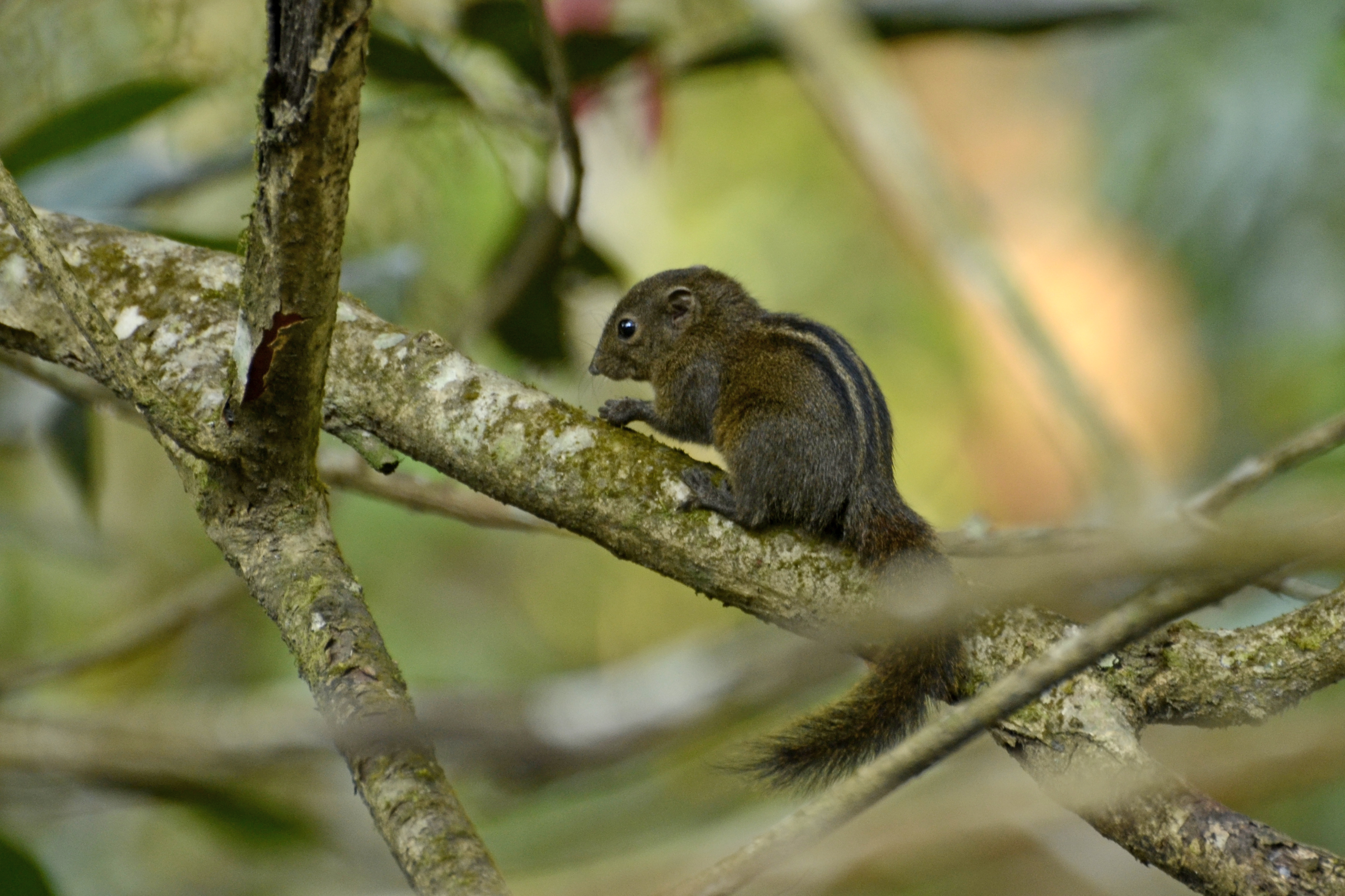

===== Species: Funambulus tristriatus (jungle palm squirrel / കാട്ടുവരയണ്ണാൻ) =====
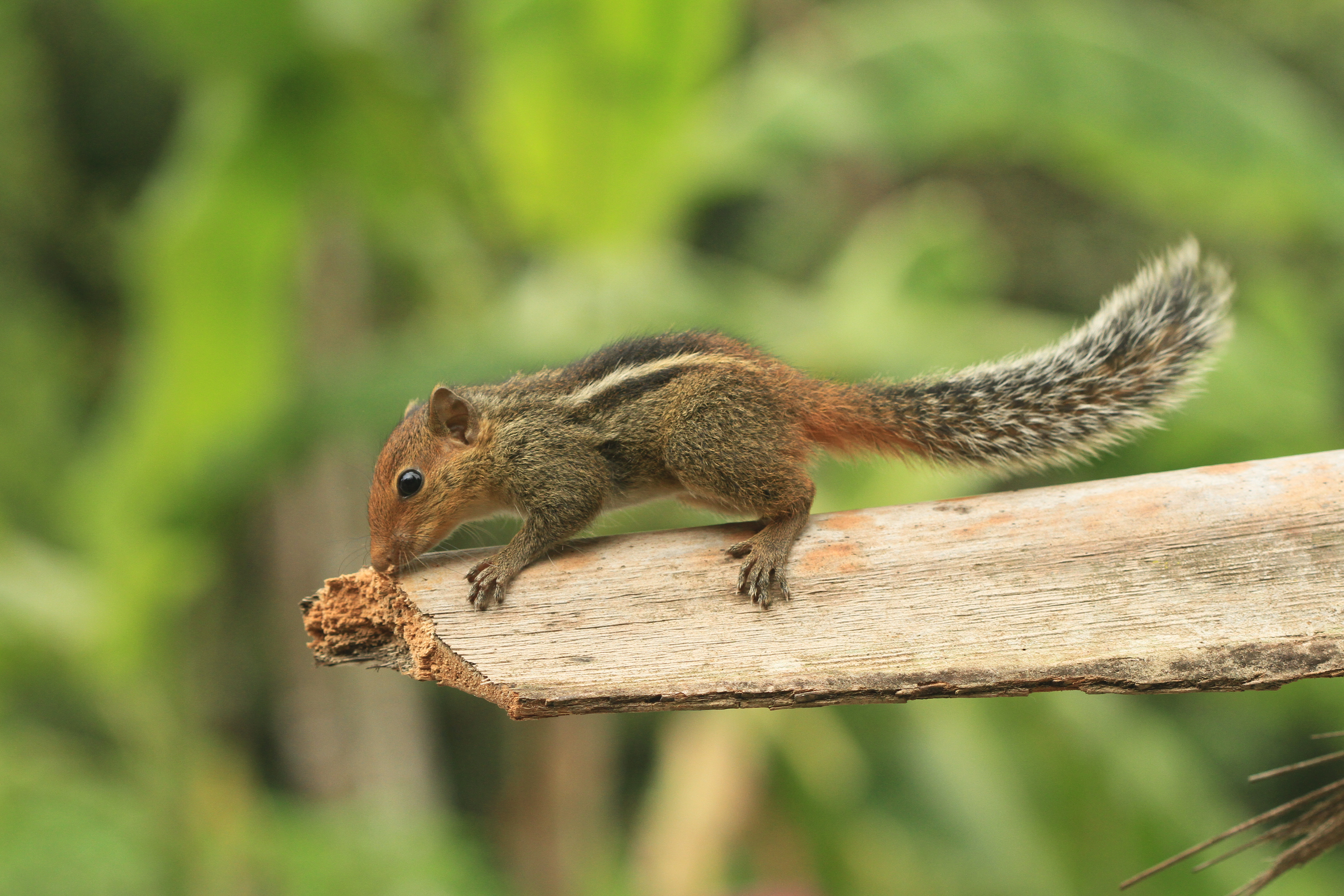

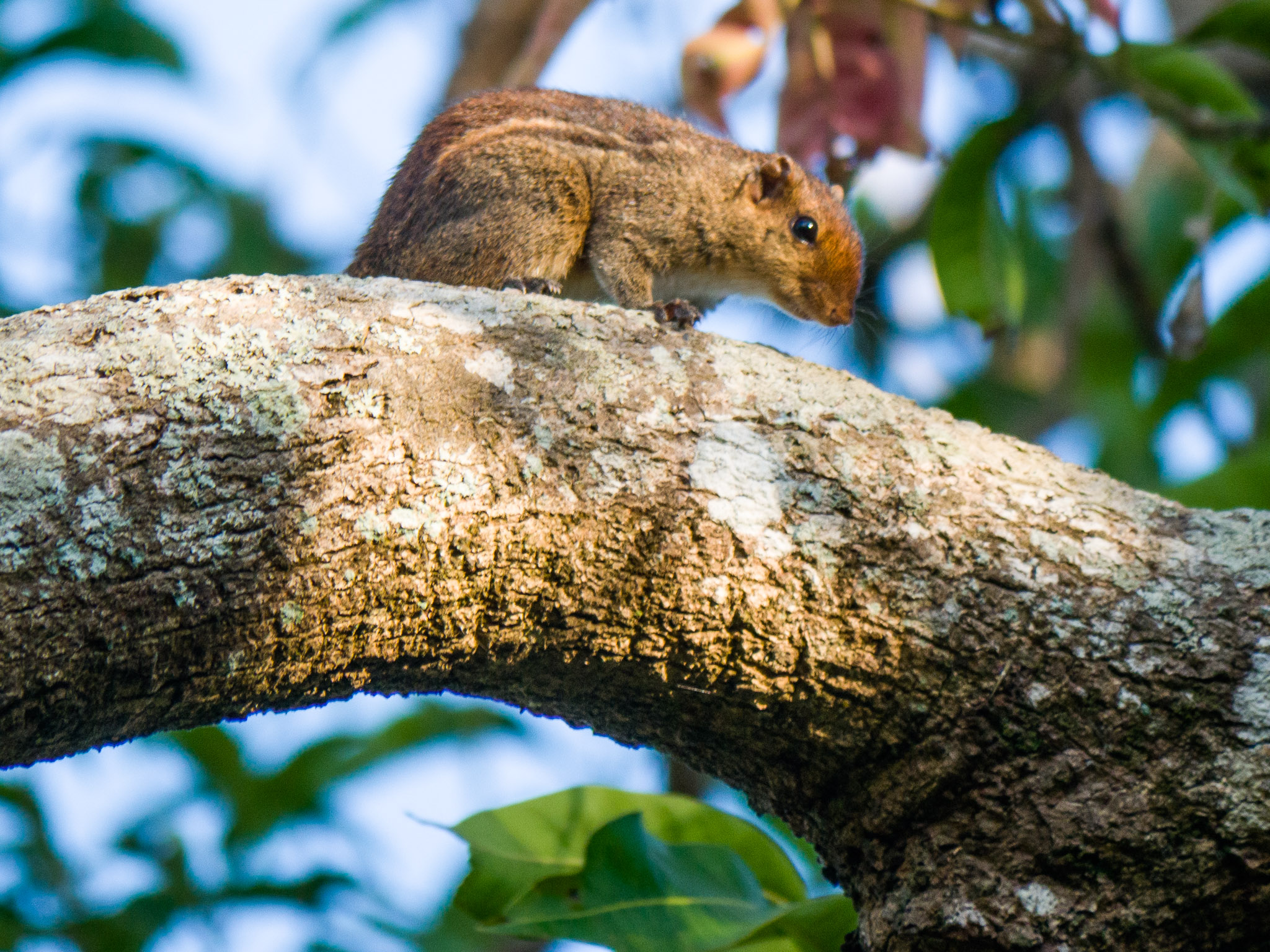

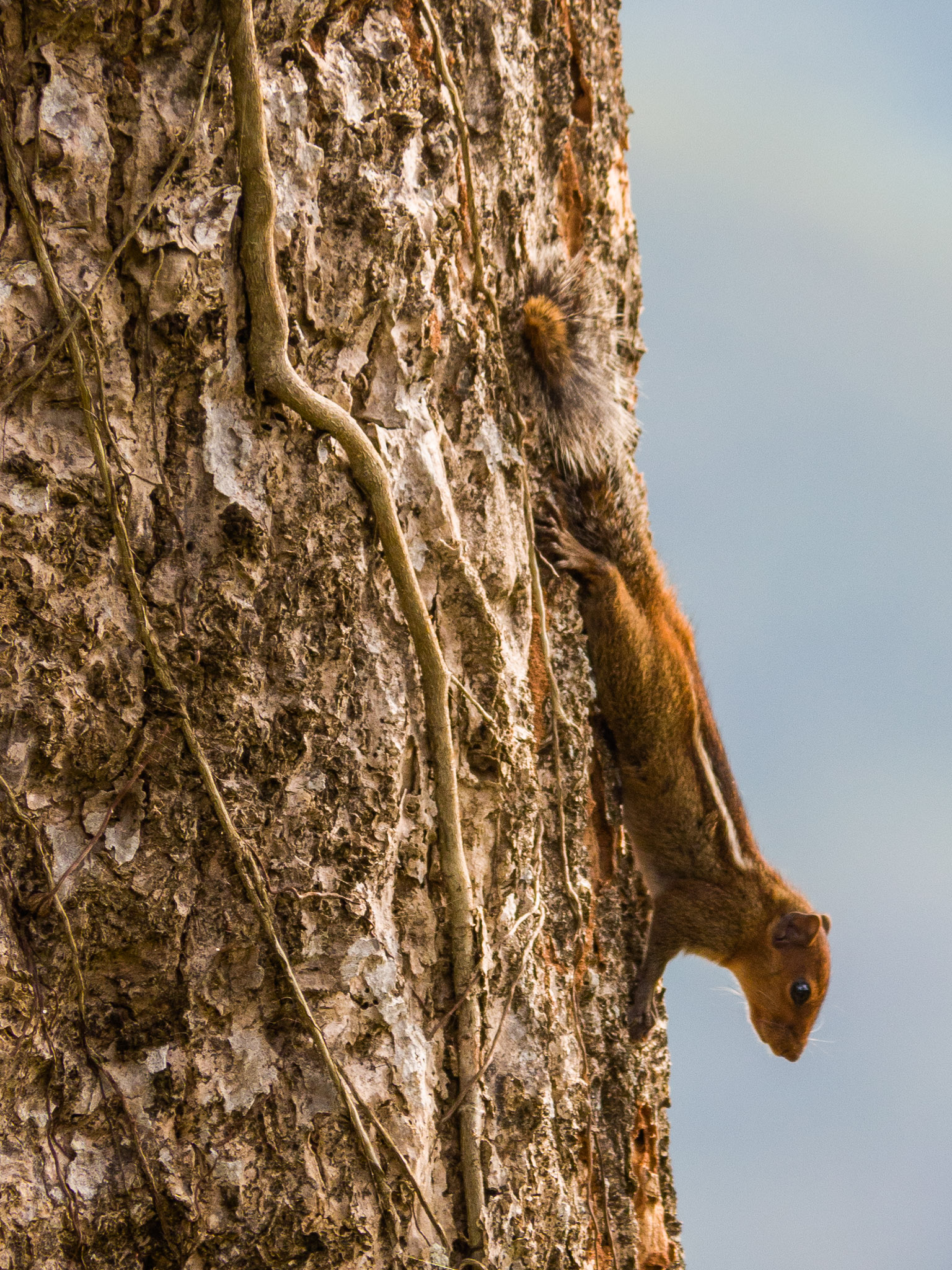

==== Genus: Petaurista ====
===== Species: Petaurista philippensis (Indian giant flying squirrel / പാറാൻ) =====
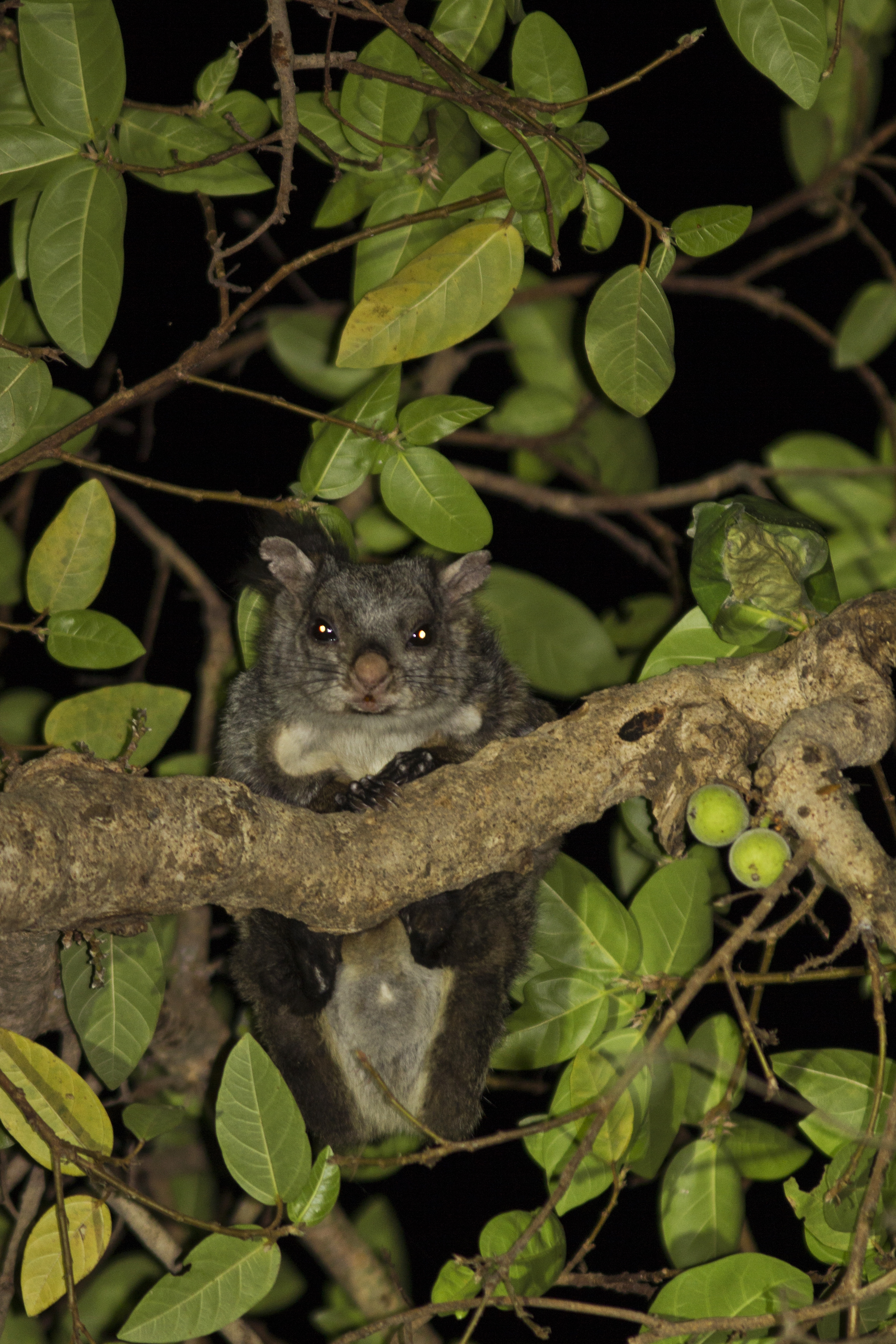

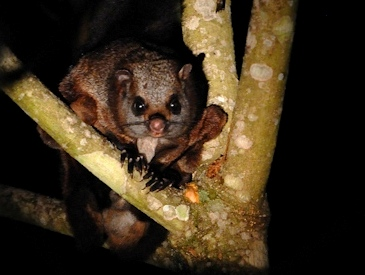

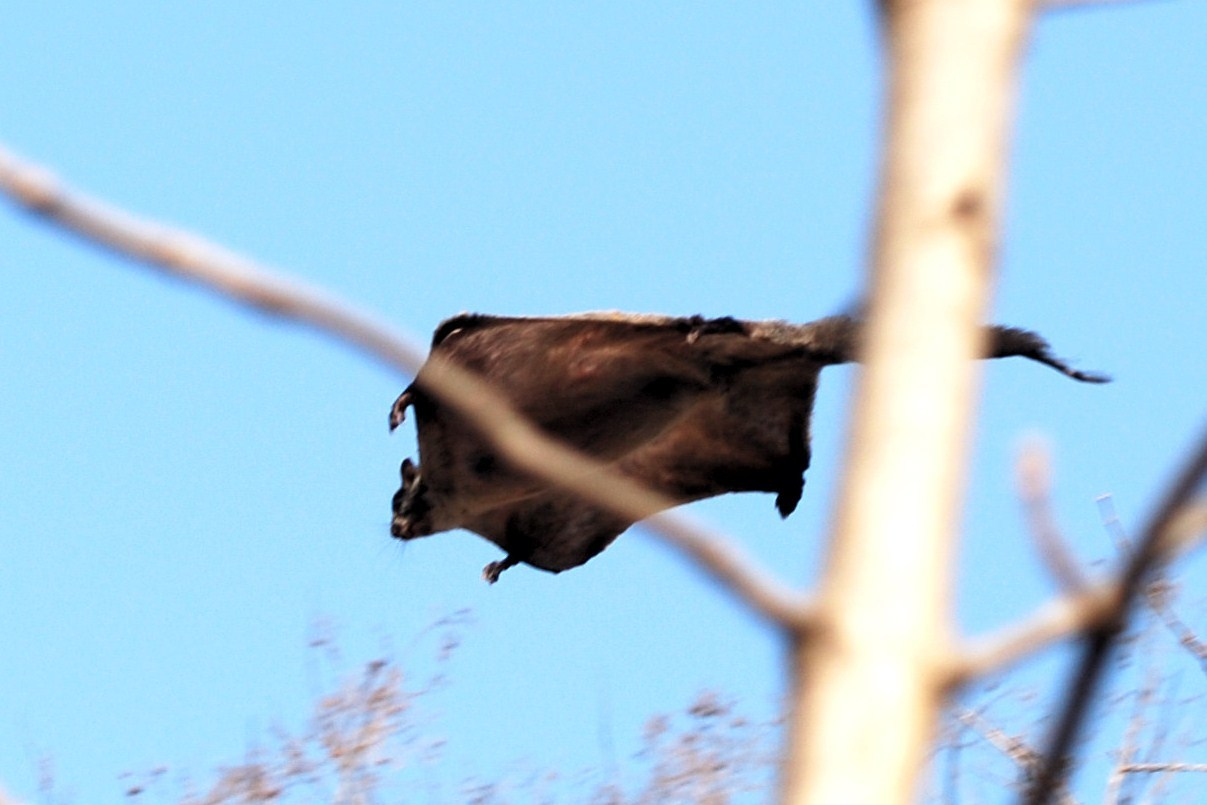

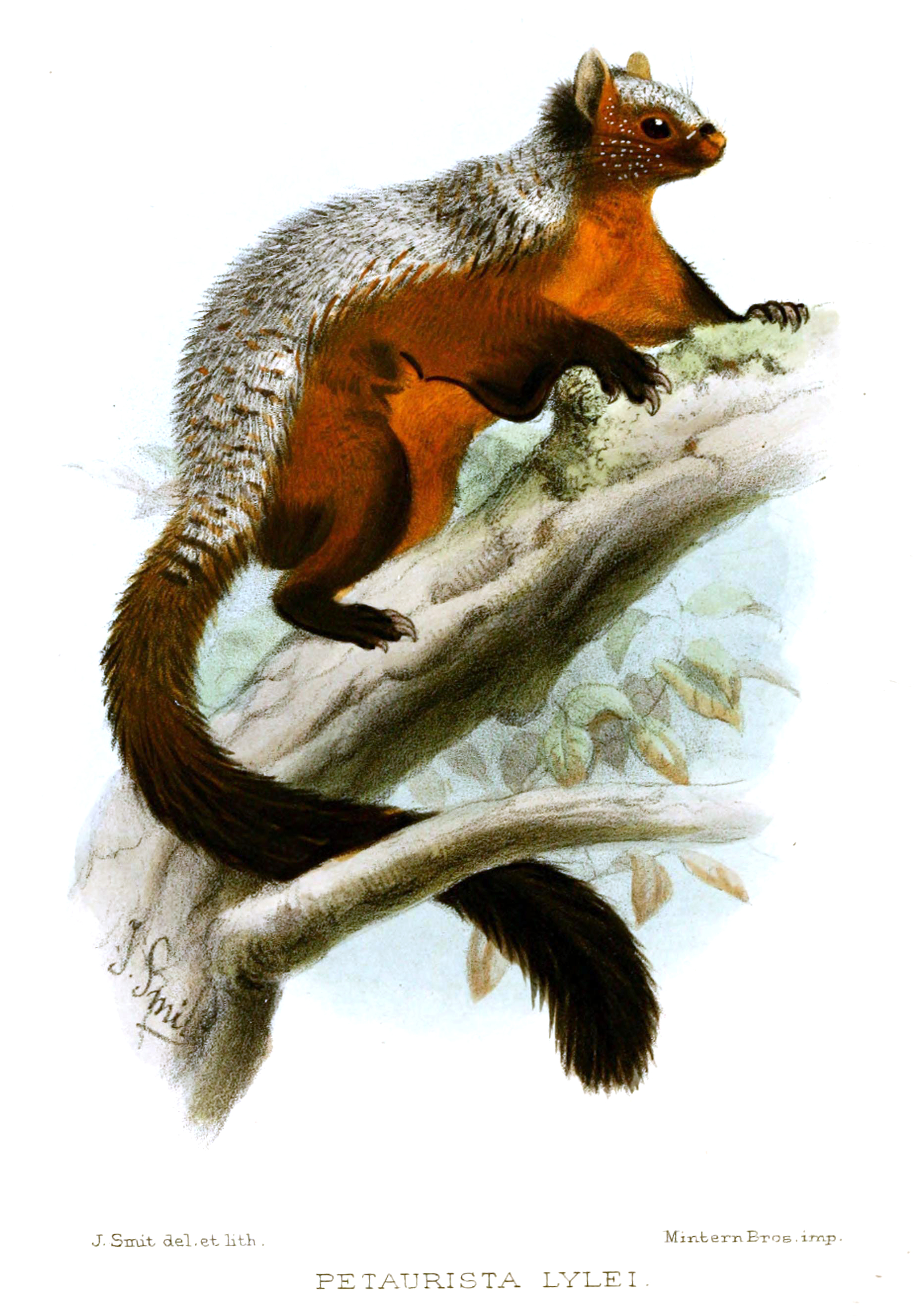
illustration

==== Genus: Ratufa ====
===== Species: Ratufa indica (Indian giant squirrel / മലയണ്ണാൻ) =====
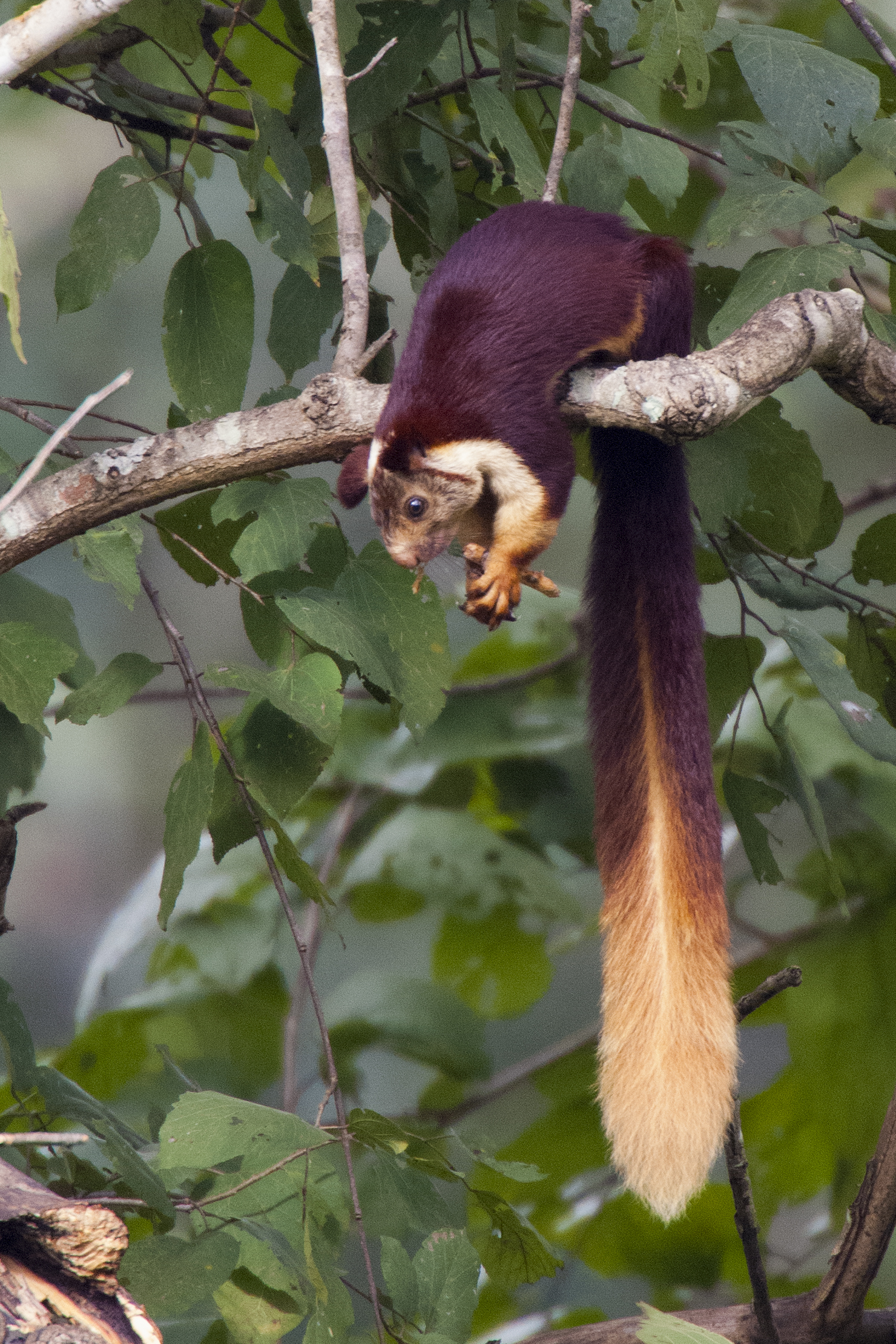

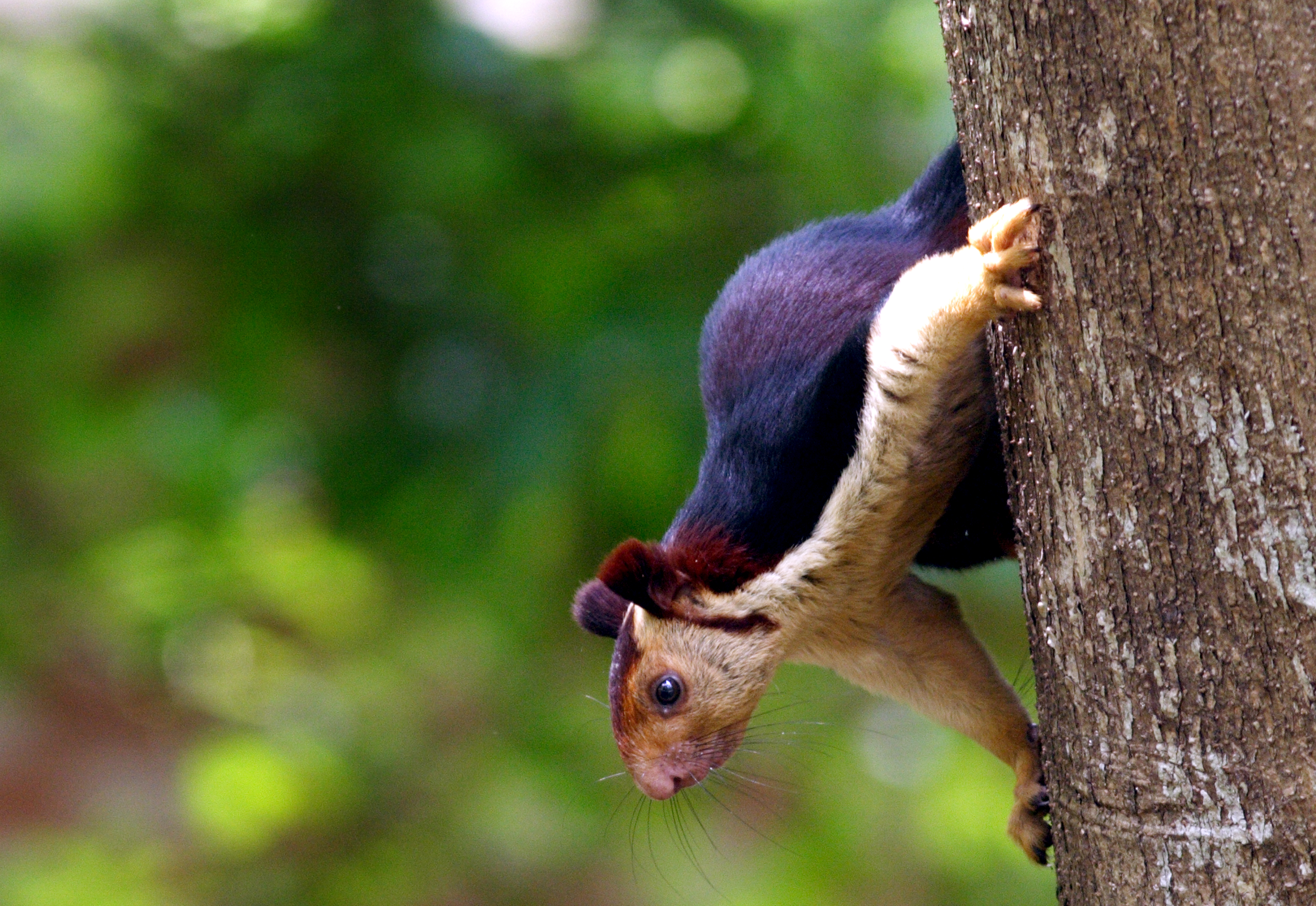

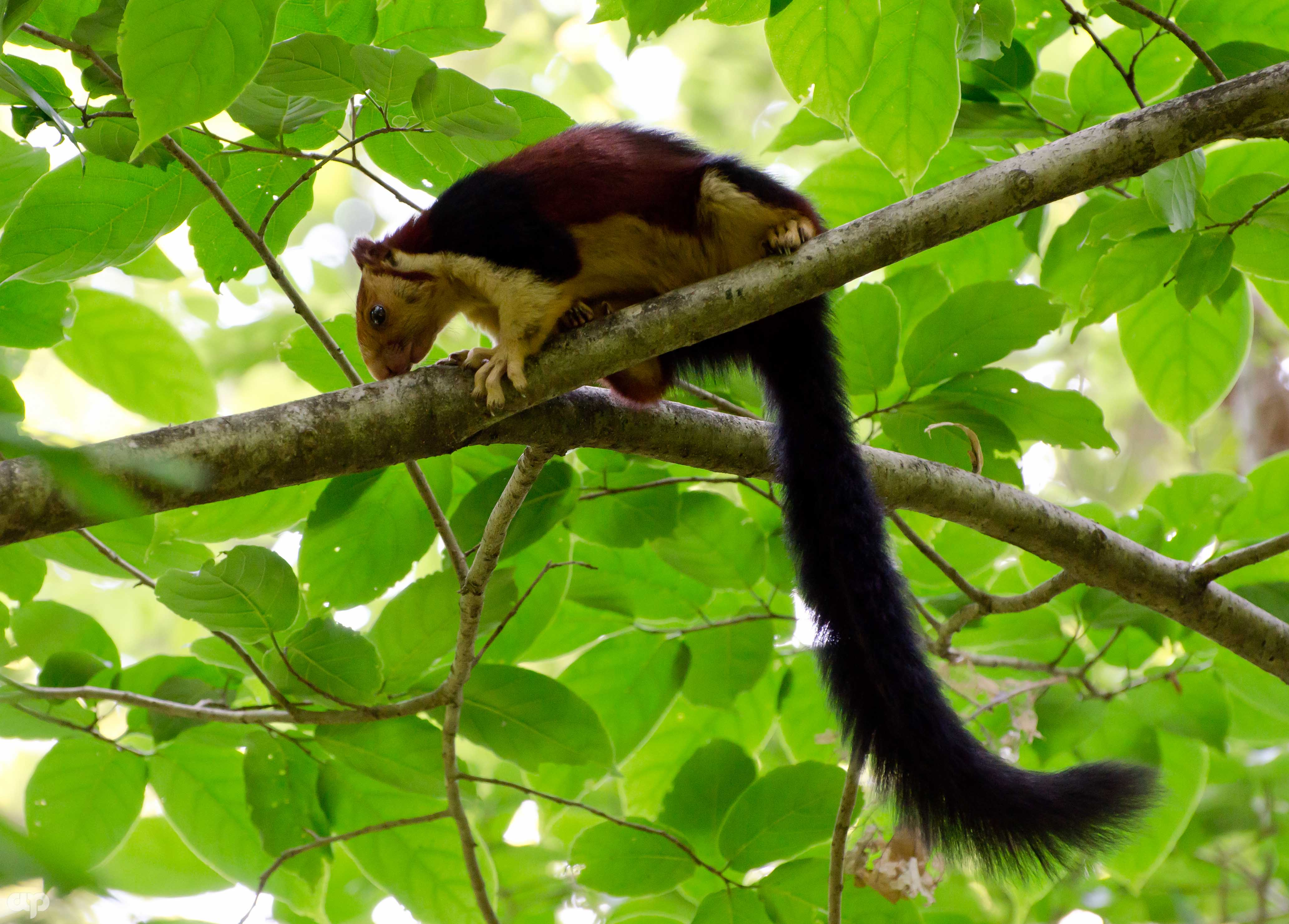

===== Species: Ratufa macroura (grizzled giant squirrel / ചാമ്പൽ മലയണ്ണാൻ) =====
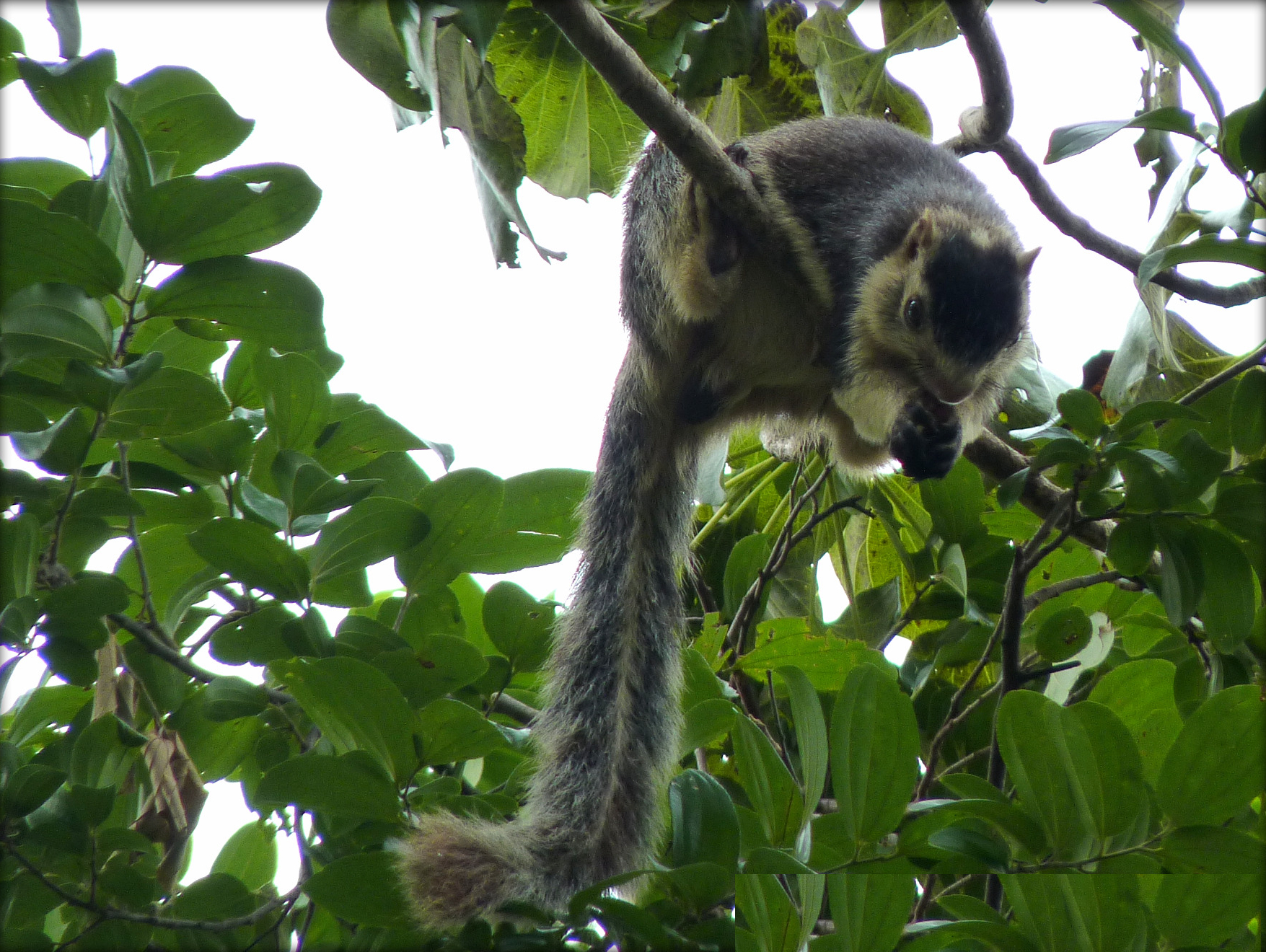

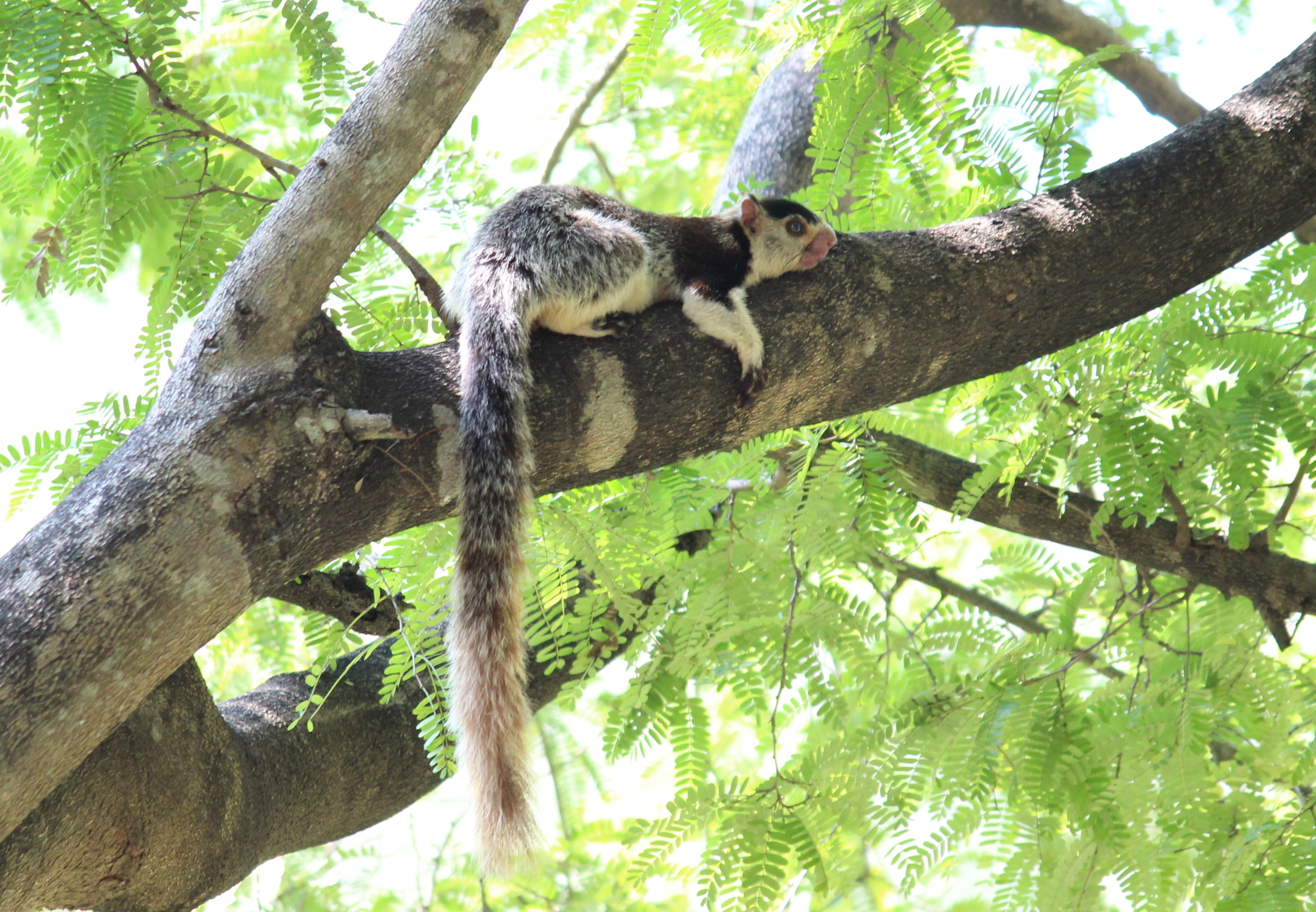

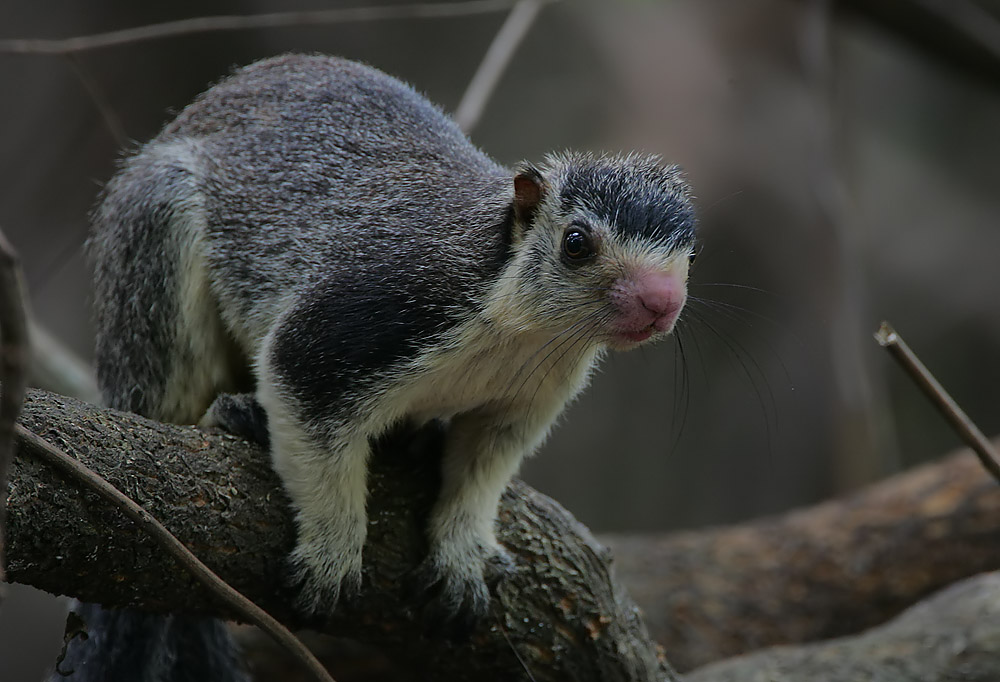

== Order: Scandentia ==
=== Family: Tupaiidae ===
==== Genus: Anathana ====
===== Species: Anathana ellioti (Madras treeshrew / മരനച്ചെലി) =====
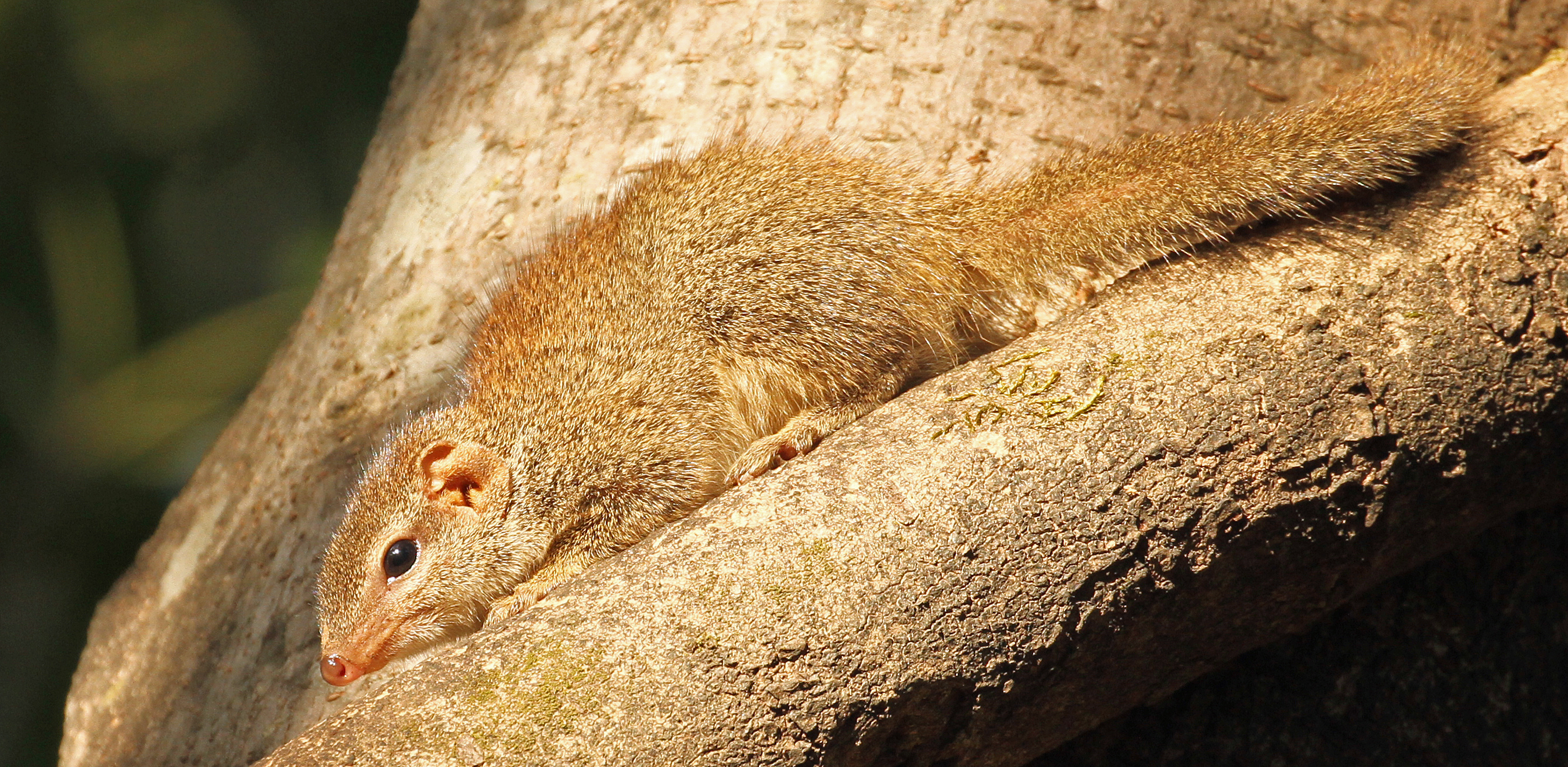

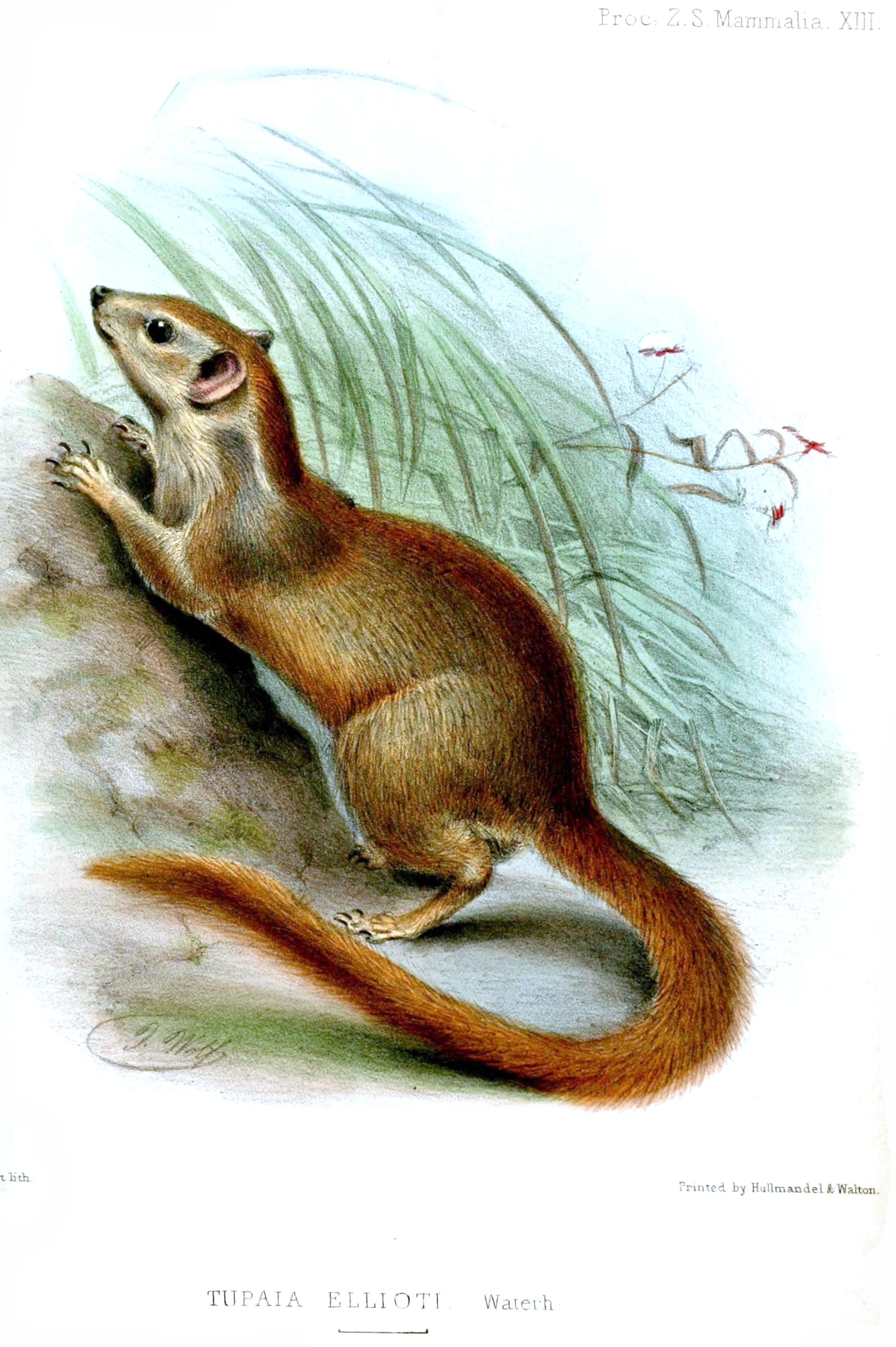
illustration

== Order: Sirenia ==
=== Family: Dugongidae ===
==== Genus: Dugong ====
===== Species: Dugong dugon (dugong / കടൽപ്പശു) =====
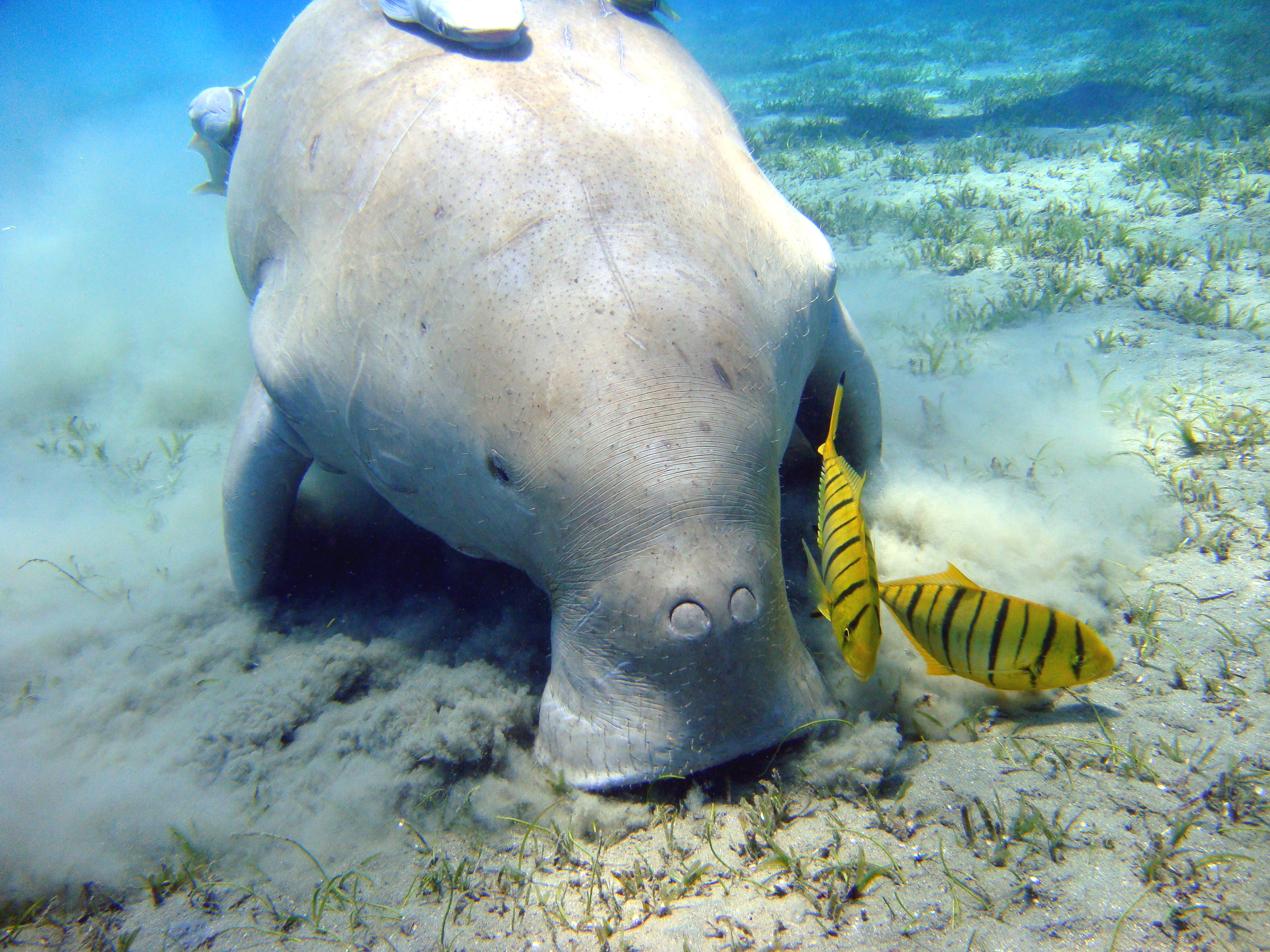

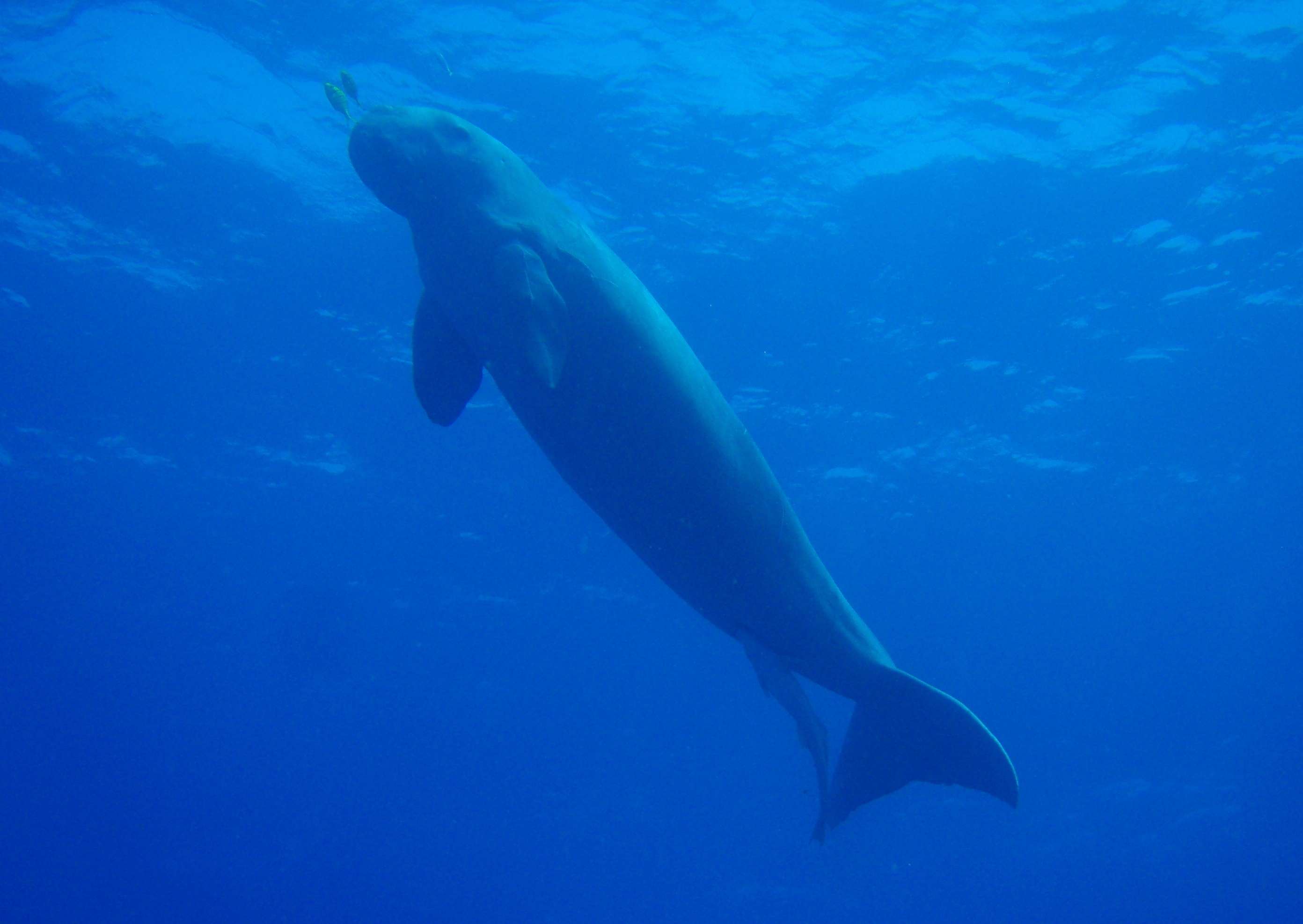

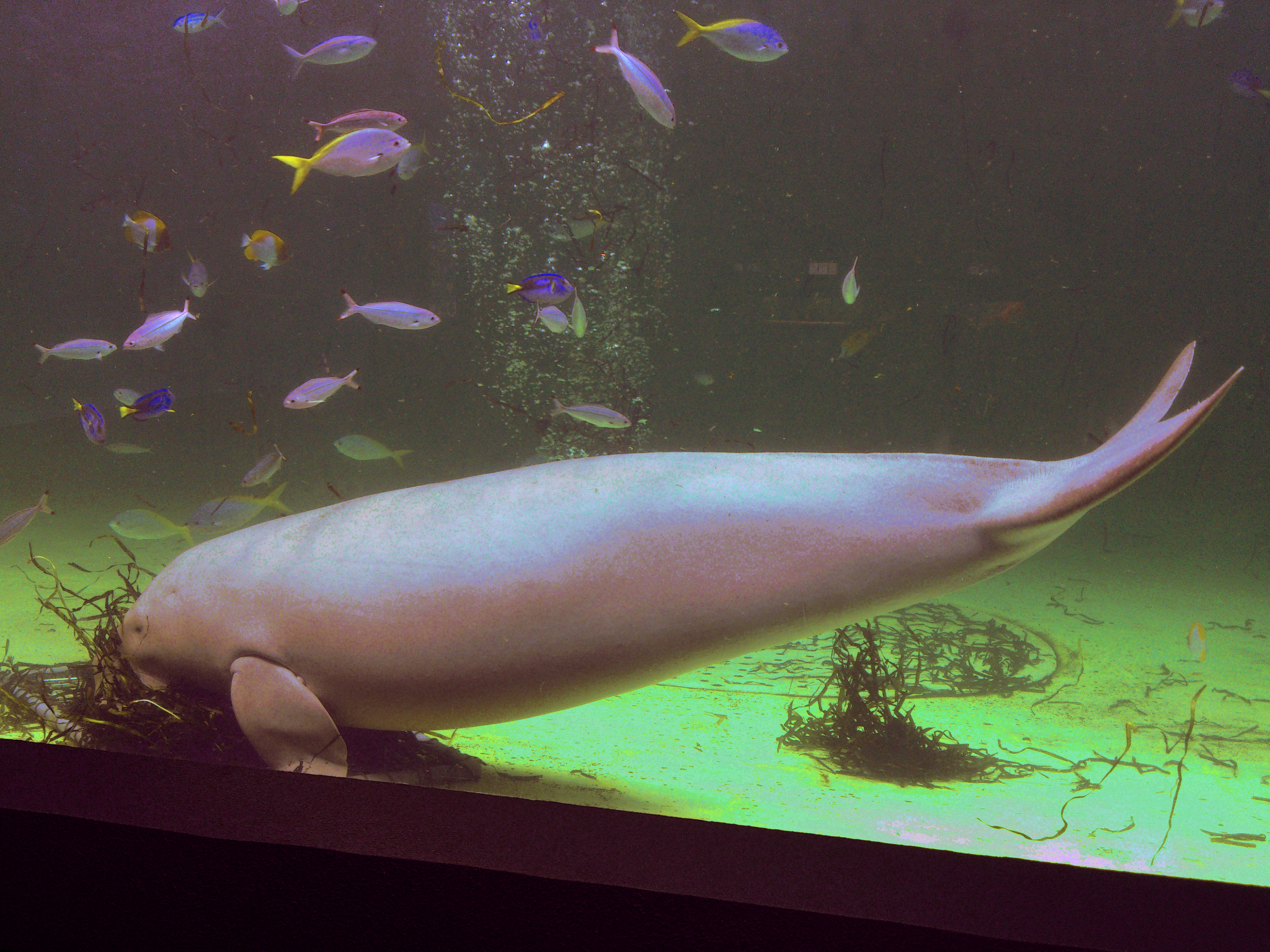
