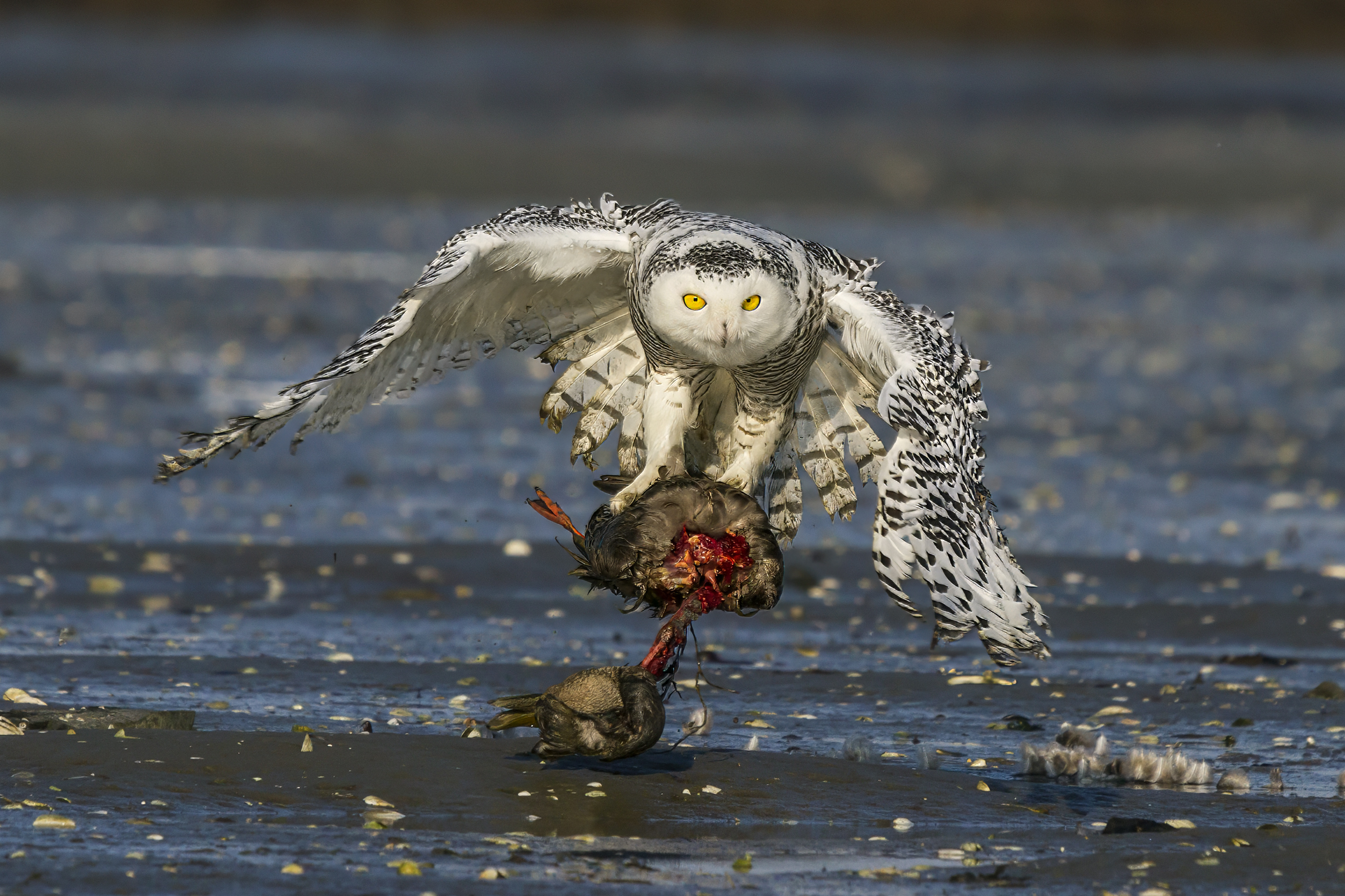
- Subadult or female with American black duck in Biddeford Pool, Maine, United States
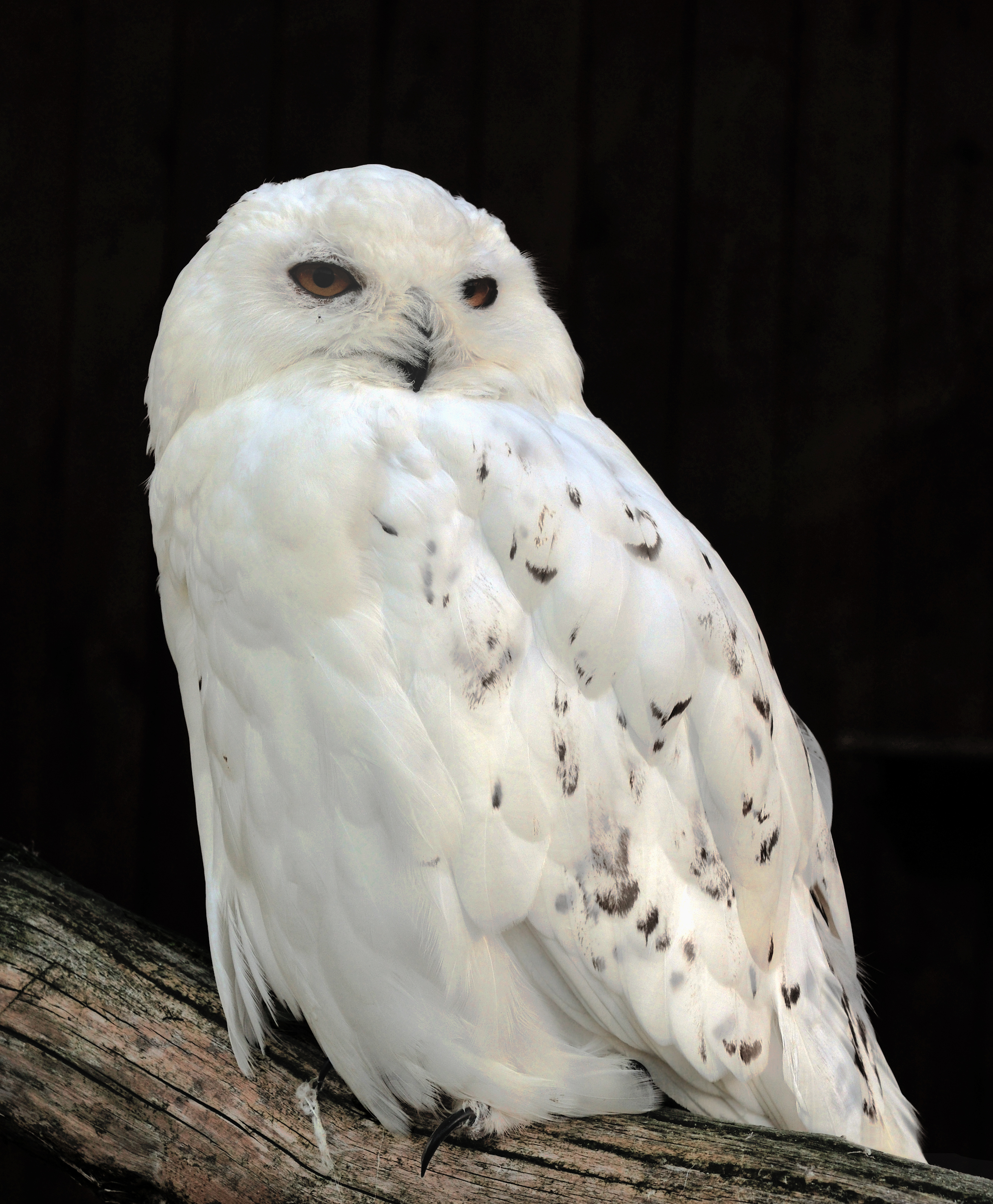
- Adult male in the Adlerwarte Berlebeck in Berlebeck, Detmold, Germany

Conservation status
- Vulnerable (IUCN 3.1)
- CITES Appendix II

Scientific classification
- Kingdom: Animalia
- Phylum: Chordata
- Class: Aves
- Order: Strigiformes
- Family: Strigidae
- Genus: Bubo
- Species: B. scandiacus

Binomial name
- Bubo scandiacus (Linnaeus, 1758)
- Breeding Non-breeding

Synonyms
- Strix scandiaca (Linnaeus, 1758); Strix nyctea (Linnaeus, 1758); Nyctea scandiaca (Linnaeus, 1758)

= Snowy owl =

Snowy owl Temporal range: Pleistocene–Present

Species of owl

The snowy owl (Bubo scandiacus), also known as the polar owl, the white owl and the Arctic owl, is a large, white owl of the true owl family. Snowy owls are native to the Arctic regions of both North America and the Palearctic, breeding mostly on the tundra. It has a number of unique adaptations to its habitat and lifestyle, which are quite distinct from other extant owls. One of the largest species of owl, it is the only owl with mainly white plumage. Males tend to be a purer white overall while females tend to have more extensive flecks of dark brown. Juvenile male snowy owls have dark markings and may appear similar to females until maturity, at which point they typically turn whiter. The composition of brown markings about the wing, although not foolproof, is the most reliable technique for aging and sexing individual snowy owls.

Most owls sleep during the day and hunt at night, but the snowy owl is often active during the day, especially in the summertime. The snowy owl is both a specialized and generalist hunter. Its breeding efforts and global population are closely tied to the availability of tundra-dwelling lemmings, but in the non-breeding season, and occasionally during breeding, the snowy owl can adapt to almost any available prey – most often other small mammals and northerly water birds, as well as, opportunistically, carrion. Snowy owls typically nest on a small rise on the ground of the tundra. The snowy owl lays a very large clutch of eggs, often from about 5 to 11, with the laying and hatching of eggs considerably staggered. Despite the short Arctic summer, the development of the young takes a relatively long time and independence is sought in autumn.

The snowy owl is a nomadic bird, rarely breeding at the same locations or with the same mates on an annual basis and often not breeding at all if prey is unavailable. A largely migratory bird, snowy owls can wander almost anywhere close to the Arctic, sometimes unpredictably irrupting to the south in large numbers. Given the difficulty of surveying such an unpredictable bird, there was little in-depth knowledge historically about the snowy owl's status; however, 2020s data suggests the species is declining precipitously. Whereas the global population was once estimated at over 200,000 individuals, 2010s–2020s data suggests that there are probably fewer than 100,000 individuals globally and that the number of successful breeding pairs is 28,000 or even considerably less. While the causes are not well understood, numerous, complex environmental factors often correlated with global warming are probably at the forefront of the fragility of the snowy owl's existence.

== Taxonomy ==
The snowy owl was one of the many bird species originally described by Carl Linnaeus in his landmark 1758 10th edition of Systema Naturae, where it was given the binomial name Strix scandiaca. The genus name Bubo is Latin for "horned owl" and scandiacus is Neo-Latin for "of Scandinavia". The former generic name Nyctea is derived from Greek meaning "night". Linnaeus originally described the different plumages of this owl as separate species, with the male specimens of snowy owls being considered Strix scandiaca and the likely females considered as Strix nyctea. Into the 21st century, the snowy owl was regarded as the sole member of a distinct genus, as Nyctea scandiaca, but mtDNA cytochrome b sequence data shows that it is very closely related to the horned owls in the genus Bubo and the species is thusly often considered inclusive with that genus; however, some authorities debate this classification, still preferring Nyctea. Often authorities are motivated to retain the separate genus on the grounds of osteological distinctions.

The engraving Snowy Owl, Plate 121 of The Birds of America by John James Audubon. Male (top) and female (bottom).

Genetic testing revealed a reasonably distinct genetic makeup for snowy owls, being about 8% genetically distinct from other Bubo owls, perhaps giving credence to those who count the species as separate under Nyctea; however, a fairly recent shared origin in evolutionary history has been illustrated through a combination of genetic study and fossil review and there is little, other than osteology of the tarsometatarsus, to outright distinguish the snowy owl from other modern species like the Eurasian eagle-owl (Bubo bubo). Genetic testing has indicated that the snowy owl may have diverged from related species at around 4 million years ago. Furthermore, it has determined that the living species genetically most closely related to the snowy owl is the great horned owl (Bubo virginianus).

On a broader scale, owls in general have, through genetic materials, been determined to be a highly distinct group, with outwardly similar groups such as Caprimulgiformes revealed to not be at all closely related. Within the owl order, typical owls are highly divergent from barn-owls. Furthermore, the Bubo genus likely clustered at some point during the evolutionary process with other largish owls, such as Strix, Pulsatrix and Ciccaba, based on broad similarities in their voice, reproductive behaviors (i.e. hooting postures) and a similar number and structure of chromosomes and autosomes. A number, but not all, of extant typical owls seem to have evolved from an ancient shared common ancestor with the Bubo owls. In addition to the question of relationship of the traditional Bubo owls to the snowy owls, ongoing ambiguity of the relationship of other similarly large-sized owls has been persistent. These have sometimes either been included in the genus or within separate genera, i.e. the Ketupu or fish owls and the Scotopelia or fishing owls. Despite the adaptive distinctions, the grouping of these large owls (i.e. Bubo, snowy, fish and perhaps fishing owls) appears to be borne out via research of karyotypes.

The fossil history of snowy owls is fairly well documented despite some early confusion on how to distinguish the skeletal structure of the snowy owls from eagle-owls. It was determined that the snowy owl once was distributed much more widely and far farther to the south during the Quaternary glaciation when much of the Northern Hemisphere was in the midst of an ice age. Fossil records shows that snowy owls once could be found in Austria, Azerbaijan, Czechoslovakia, England, France, Germany, Hungary, Italy, Poland, Sardinia and Spain as well as in the Americas in Cape Prince of Wales, Little Kiska Island, St. Lawrence Island, and in Illinois. In the Late Pleistocene the range expanded southward even more so to Bulgaria (80,000–16,000 years, Kozarnika Cave, W Bulgaria). and much of the Italian Peninsula. Pleistocene era fossils from France, i.e. B. s. gallica, showed that the snowy owls of the time were somewhat bulkier (although still notably smaller than contemporary eagle-owls of the times, which were larger than the modern-day eagle-owls) and osteologically more sexually dimorphic in size than the modern form (9.9% dimorphism in favor of females in the fossils against 4.8% in the same features). There are no subspecific or other geographical variations reported in the modern snowy owls, with individuals of vastly different origins breeding together readily due to their nomadic habits. Despite apparent variations in body size, environmental conditions are the likely variant rather than genetics. No evidence could be found of phylogeographic variation in snowy owls upon testing. Furthermore, the snowy owl appears to have a similar level of genetic diversity as other European owls.

=== Hybrids ===
Snowy owls are not known to interbreed with other owl species in the wild, and accordingly, no hybrids of snowy owls and other owl species have yet been sighted in the wild. However, a hobby falconer in Kollnburg, Germany, bred hybrids from a male snowy owl and a female Eurasian eagle-owl (Bubo bubo) in 2013. The two resulting male hybrid owls possessed the prominent ear-tufts (generally visually absent in snowy owls), general size, orange eyes, and the same pattern of black markings on their plumage from their Eurasian eagle-owl mother, while retaining the generally black-and-white plumage colours from their snowy owl father. The hybrids were dubbed "Schnuhus" from the German words for snowy owl and Eurasian eagle-owl (Schnee-Eule and Uhu, respectively). As of 2014, the hybrids had grown to maturity and were healthy.

== Description ==
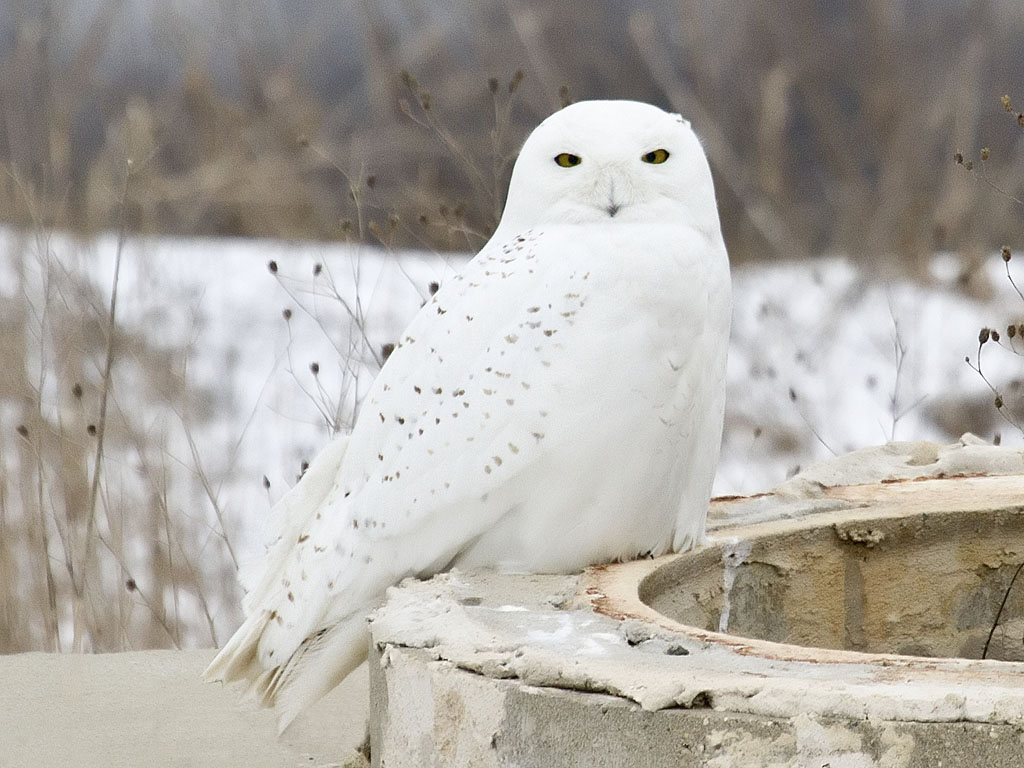
Male snowy owls such as this are particularly distinctive due to the more extensive covering of white feathers.

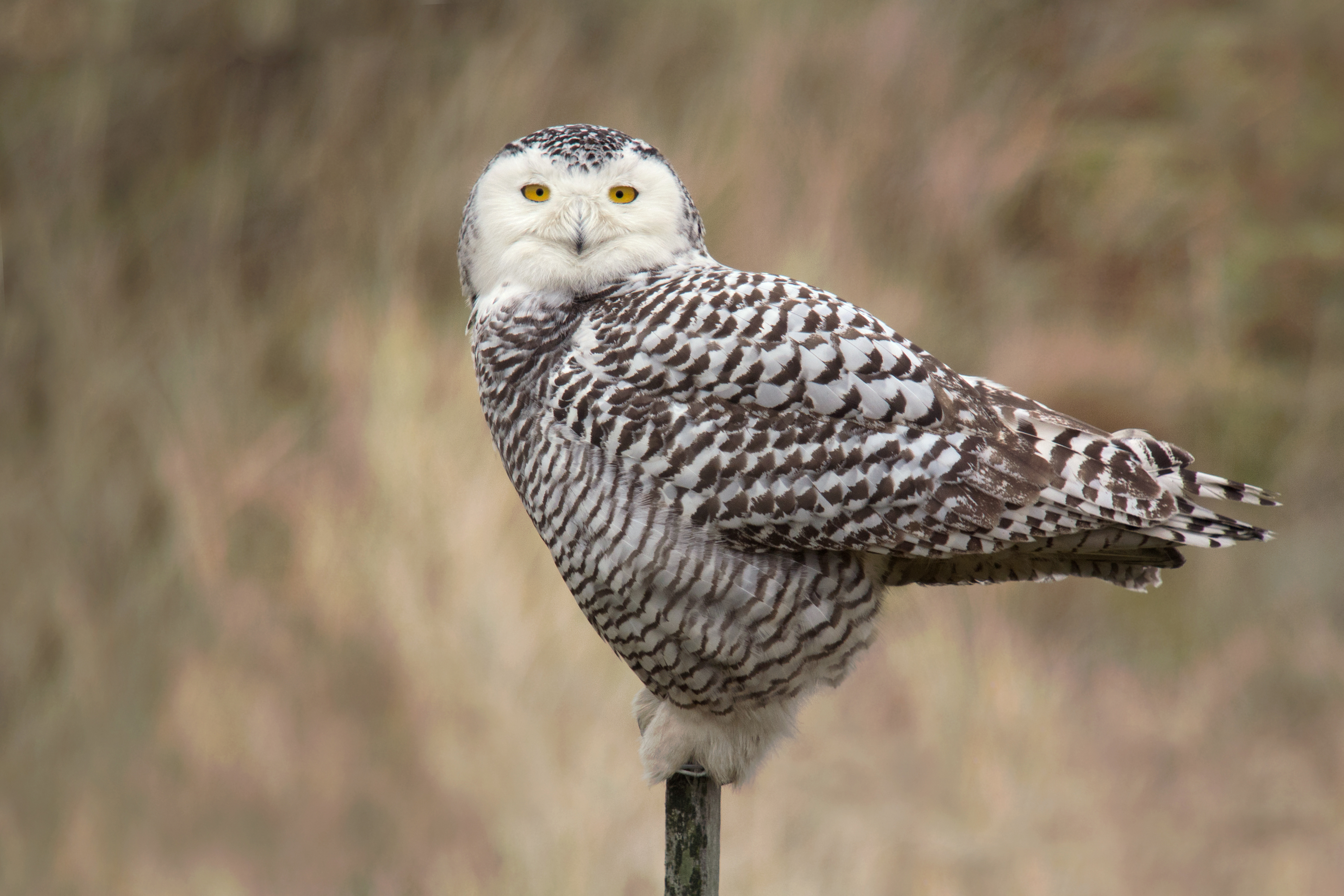
Female snowy owls are heavily marked compared to males.

The snowy owl is mostly white. They are purer white than predatory mammals such as polar bears (Ursus maritimus) and Arctic fox (Vulpes lagopus). Often when seen in the field, these owls can resemble a pale rock or a lump of snow on the ground. They usually appear to lack ear tufts but very short (and probably vestigial) tufts can be erected in some situations, perhaps most frequently by the female when she is sitting on the nest. The ear tufts measure about 20 to 25 mm (0.79 to 0.98 in) and consist of about 10 small feathers. The snowy owl has bright yellow eyes. The head is relatively small and, even for the relatively simply adapted hearing mechanism of a Bubo owl, the facial disc is shallow and the ear is uncomplicated. 1 male had ear slits of merely 21 mm × 14 mm (0.83 in × 0.55 in) on left and 21 mm × 14.5 mm (0.83 in × 0.57 in) on the right.

Females are almost invariably more duskily patterned than like-age males. In mature males, the upper parts are plain white with usually a few dark spots on the miniature ear-tufts, about the head and the tips of some primaries and secondaries whilst the underside is often pure white. Despite their reputation for being purely white, only 3 out of 129 Russian museum specimens of adult males showed an almost complete absence of darker spots. The adult female is usually considerably more spotted and often slightly barred with dark brown on the crown and the underparts. Her flight and tail feathers are faintly barred brown whilst the underparts are white in base color with brown spotting and barring on the flanks and upper breast. In confusingly plumaged snowy owls, the sex can be determined by the shape of wing markings, which manifest as bars more so in females and spots in males. However, the very darkest males and the lightest females are nearly indistinguishable by plumage.

On rare occasions, a female can appear almost pure white, as has been recorded in both the field and in captivity. There is some evidence that some of the species grow paler with age after maturity. One study's conclusions were that males were usually but not always lighter and that correctly aging is extremely difficult, sometimes individuals either get lighter, darker or do not change their appearance with age. On the other hand, with close study, it is possible to visually identify even individual snowy owls using the pattern of markings on the wing, which can be somewhat unique in each individual. After a fresh moult, some adult females that previously appeared relatively pale newly evidenced dark, heavy markings. On the contrary, some banded individuals over at least four years were observed to have been almost entirely unchanged in the extent of their markings. In another very pale owl, the barn owl (Tyto alba), the sexual dimorphism of spotting appears to be driven by genetics while, in snowy owls, environment may be the dictating factor instead.

The chicks are initially grayish white but quickly transition to dark gray-brown in the mesoptile plumage. This type of plumage camouflages effectively against the variously colored lichens that dot the tundra ground. This is gradually replaced by plumage showing dark barring on white. At the point of fledging, the plumage often becomes irregularly mottled or blotched with dark and is mostly solidly dark gray-brown above with white eyebrows and other areas of the face white. Recently fledged young can already be sexed to a semi-reliable degree by the dark marking patterns about their wings. The juvenile plumage resembles that of adult females but averages slightly darker on average. By their second moult fewer or more broken bars are usually evidenced on the wing. The extent of white and composition of wing patterns become more dimorphic by sex with each juvenile moult, culminating in the 4th or 5th pre-basic moult, wherein the owls are hard to distinguish from mature adults.

Moults usually occur from July and September, non-breeding birds moulting later and more extensively, and are never extensive enough to render the owls flightless. Evidence indicates that snowy owls may attain adult plumage at 3 to 4 years of age, but fragmentary information suggests that some males are not fully mature and/or as fully white in plumage that they can attain until the 9th or 10th year. Generally speaking, moults of snowy owls occur more quickly than do those of Eurasian eagle-owls.

The toes of the snowy owl are extremely thickly feathered white, while the claws are black. The toe feathers are the longest known of any owl, averaging at 33.3 mm (1.31 in), against the great horned owl which has the 2nd longest toe feathers at a mean of 13 mm (0.51 in) Occasionally, snowy owls may show a faint blackish edge to the eyes and have a dark gray cere, though this is often not visible from the feather coverage, and a black bill. Unlike many other whitish birds, the snowy owl does not possess black wingtips, which is theorized to minimize wear-and-tear on the wing feathers in the other whitish bird types. The conspicuously notched primaries of the snowy owl appear to give an advantage over similar owls in long-distance flight and more extensive flapping flight.

The snowy owl does have some of the noise-canceling serrations and comb-like wing feathers that render the flight of most owls functionally silent, but they have fewer than most related Bubo owls. Therefore, in combination with its less soft feathers, the flight of a snowy owl can be somewhat audible at close range. The flight of snowy owls tends to be steady and direct and is reminiscent to some of the flight of a large, slow-flying falcon. Though normally performing "flap-and-glide" flight style, there is no evidence that snowy owls will soar. This owl species can occasionally demonstrate speed and agility in the air while chasing avian prey. Hovering flight is sometimes used by snowy owls as a hunting method, despite their large size. It is said that the species seldom exceeds a flying height of around 150 m (490 ft) even during passage. While the feet are sometimes described as large, the tarsus is in osteological terms relatively short at 68% the length of those of a Eurasian eagle-owl but the claws are nearly as large, at 89% of the size of those of the eagle-owl.

Despite its relatively short length, the tarsus is of similar circumference as in other Bubo owls. Also compared to an eagle-owl, the snowy owl has a relatively short decurved rostrum, a proportionately greater length to the interorbital roof and a much longer scleral ring surrounding the eyes while the anterior opening are the greatest known in any owl. Owls' eyes are large and round, which are nearly the same size in large species such as the snowy owl as those of humans.

The snowy owl's eye, at about 23.4 mm (0.92 in) in diameter, is slightly smaller than those of great horned and Eurasian eagle-owls but is slightly larger than those of some other large owls. Snowy owls must be able to see from great distances and in highly variable conditions but probably possess less acute night vision than many other owls. Based on the study of dioptres in different owl species, the snowy owl was determined to have eyesight better suited to long-range perception than to close discrimination, while some related species such as great horned owls could probably more successfully perceive closer objects. Despite their visual limits, snowy owls may have up to 1.5 times more visual acuity than humans. Like other owls, snowy owls can probably perceive all colors but cannot perceive ultraviolet visual pigments. Owls'brains are the largest of any bird brain (increasing in sync with the size of the owl species), with the size of the brain and eye related less to intelligence than perhaps to increased nocturnality and predatory behavior.

=== Size ===
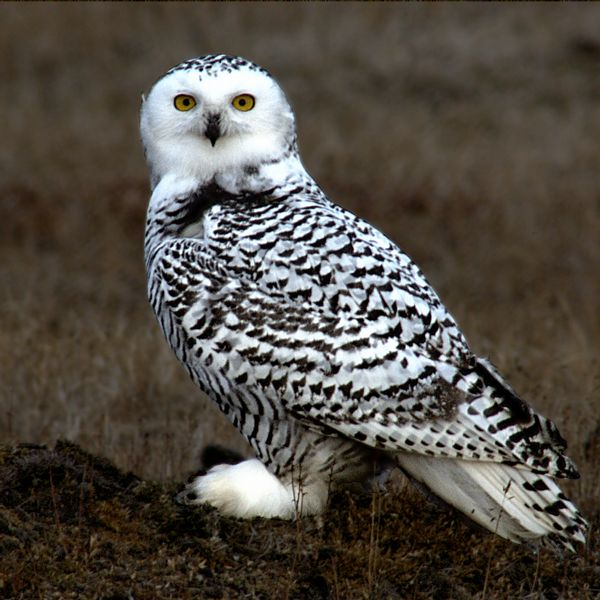
Young owl on the tundra at Utqiaġvik, Alaska. Snowy owls lose their black feathers with age, although individual females may retain some.

The snowy owl is one of the large owl species. They are the largest avian predator of the High Arctic and one of the largest owls in the world. Snowy owls are about the sixth or seventh heaviest living owl on average, around the fifth longest and perhaps the third longest winged. This species is the heaviest and longest winged owl (as well as the second longest) in North America, the second heaviest and longest winged owl in Europe (and third longest) but is outsized in bulk by 3 or 4 other species in Asia. Despite being sometimes described as of similar size, the snowy owl is somewhat larger in all aspects of average size than the great horned owl while the similarly specialized taiga-dwelling great grey owl (Strix nebulosa), is longer in total length and of similar dimensions in standard measurements, but is shorter winged and much less heavy than the snowy owl.

In Eurasia, the Eurasian eagle-owl is larger in all standards of measurements than the snowy owl not to mention two additional species each from Africa and Asia that are slightly to considerably heavier on average than the snowy owl. Like most birds of prey, the snowy owl shows reverse sexual dimorphism relative to most non-raptorial birds in that females are larger than males. Sexual dimorphism that favors the female may have some correlation with being able to more effectively withstand food shortages such as during brooding as well as the rigors associated with incubating and brooding. Females are sometimes described as "giant" whereas males appear relatively "neat and compact". However, the sexual dimorphism is relatively less pronounced compared to some other Bubo species.

Male snowy owls have been known to measure from 52.5 to 64 cm (20.7 to 25.2 in) in total length, with an average from four large samples of 58.7 cm (23.1 in) and a maximum length, perhaps in need of verification, of reportedly 70.7 cm (27.8 in). In wingspan, males may range from 116 to 165.6 cm (3 ft 10 in to 5 ft 5 in), with a mean of 146.6 cm (4 ft 10 in). In females, total length has been known to range from 54 to 71 cm (21 to 28 in), with a mean of 63.7 cm (25.1 in) and an unverified maximum length of perhaps 76.7 cm (30.2 in) (if so they would have the second longest maximum length of any living owl, after only the great grey owl).

Female wingspans have reportedly measured from 146 to 183 cm (4 ft 9 in to 6 ft 0 in), with a mean of 159 cm (5 ft 3 in). Despite one study claiming that snowy owl had the highest wing loading (i.e. grams per square cm of wing area) of any of 15 well-known owl species, more extensive sampling demonstratively illustrated that the wing loading of snowy owls is notably lower than Eurasian eagle- and great horned owls. The conspicuously long-winged profile of a flying snowy owl compared to these related species may cause some to compare their flight profile to a bulkier version of an enormous Buteo or a large falcon. Body mass in males can average from 1,465 to 1,808.3 g (3.230 to 3.987 lb), with a median of 1,658.2 g (3.656 lb) and a full weight range of 1,300 to 2,500 g (2.9 to 5.5 lb) from six sources. Body mass in females can average from 1,706.7 to 2,426 g (3.763 to 5.348 lb), with a median of 2,101.8 g (4.634 lb) and a full weight range of 1,330 to 2,951 g (2.932 to 6.506 lb). Larger than the aforementioned body mass studies, a massive pooled dataset at six wintering sites in North America showed that 995 males averaged at 1,636 g (3.607 lb) while 1,189 females were found to average 2,109 g (4.650 lb). Reported weights of down to 710 g (1.57 lb) for males and of 780 to 1,185 g (1.720 to 2.612 lb) for females are probably in reference to owls in a state of starvation. Such emaciated individuals are known to highly impaired and starvation deaths are probably not infrequent in winters with poor food accesses.

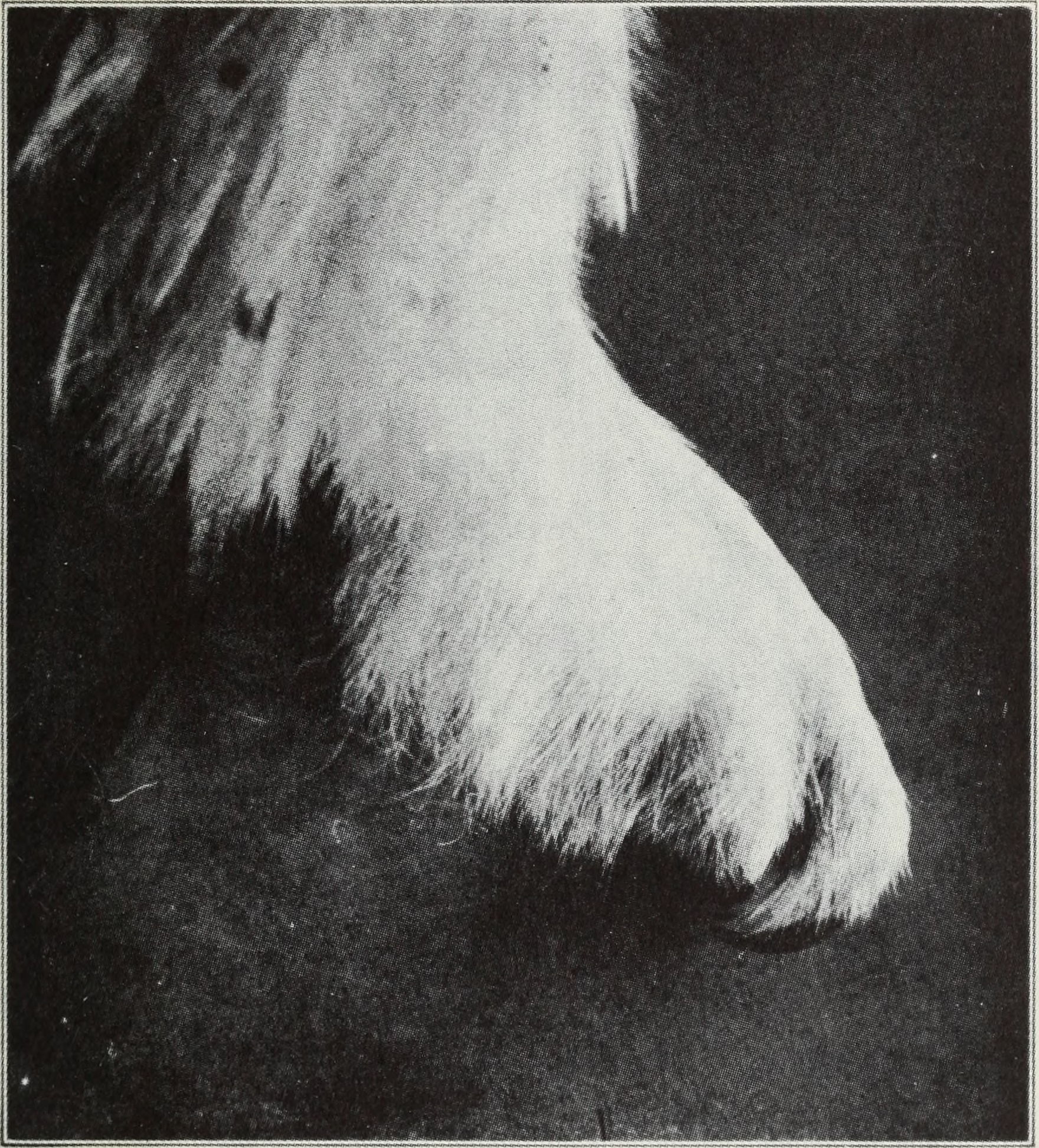
Snowy owls have powerful feet that are heavily covered with feathering.

Standard measurements have been even more widely reported than length and wingspan. The wing chord of males can vary from 351 to 439 mm (13.8 to 17.3 in), averaging from 380.1 to 412 mm (14.96 to 16.22 in) with a median of 402.8 mm (15.86 in). The wing chord of females can vary from 380 to 477.3 mm (14.96 to 18.79 in), averaging from 416.2 to 445 mm (16.39 to 17.52 in) with a median of 435.5 mm (17.15 in). The tail length of males can vary on average from 209.6 to 235.4 mm (8.25 to 9.27 in), with a full range of 188 to 261 mm (7.4 to 10.3 in) and a median of 227 mm (8.9 in). The tail length of females can average from 228.5 to 254.4 mm (9.00 to 10.02 in), with a full range of 205 to 288 mm (8.1 to 11.3 in) and a median of 244.4 mm (9.62 in).

Data indicates that slightly longer wing chord and tail lengths were reported on average in Russian data than in American research, however the weights were not significantly different in the two regions. Less widely taken measurements include the culmen, which can measure from 24.6 to 29 mm (0.97 to 1.14 in) with a median average of 26.3 mm (1.04 in) in males and 27.9 mm (1.10 in) in females, and the total bill length which is from 25 to 42 mm (0.98 to 1.65 in), with an average in both sexes of 35.6 mm (1.40 in). Tarsal length in males averages about 63.6 mm (2.50 in), with a range of 53 to 72 mm (2.1 to 2.8 in), and averages about 66 mm (2.6 in), with a range of 54 to 75 mm (2.1 to 3.0 in), in females.

=== Identification ===
The snowy owl is certainly one of the most unmistakable owls (or perhaps even animals) in the world. No other species attains the signature white stippled sparsely with black-brown color of these birds, a coloring which renders their bright yellow eyes all the more detectable, nor possesses their obvious extremely long feathering. The only other owl to breed in the High Arctic is the short-eared owl (Asio flammeus). Both species inhabit open country, overlap in range and are often seen by day, but the short-eared is much smaller and more tan or straw-colored in coloration, with streaked brown on chest. Even the palest short-eared owls conspicuously differ and are darker than the snowy owl; additionally the short-eared most often hunts in extended flights.

More similar owls such as the Eurasian eagle-owl and the great horned owl attain a fairly pale, sometimes white-washed look in their northernmost races. These species do not normally breed nearly as far north as snowy owls but overlaps certainly do occur with snowy owls when the latter owl sometimes comes south in winter. However, even the most pale great horned and Eurasian eagle-owls are still considerably more heavily marked with darker base colors than snowy owls (the whitest eagle-owls are paler than the whitest great horned owls), possess much larger and more conspicuous ear tufts and lack the bicolored appearance of the darkest snowy owls. While the great horned owls' eyes are eyes like the snowy owl, the Eurasian eagle-owl tends to have bright orange eyes. The open terrain habitats normally used by wintering snowy owls are also distinct from the typical edge and rocky habitats usually favored by the great horned and Eurasian eagle-owls, respectively.

=== Vocalizations ===
The snowy owl differ in their calls from other Bubo owls, with a much more barking quality to their version of a hooting song. Perhaps as many as 15 different calls by mature snowy owls have been documented. The main vocalization is a monotonous sequence that normally contains 2–6 (but occasionally more), rough notes similar to the rhythm of a barking dog: krooh krooh krooh krooh... The call may end with an emphatic aaoow, which is somewhat reminiscent of the deep alarm call of a great black-backed gull (Larus marinus). They will call mainly from a perch but also sometimes do so in flight. The krooh call of the male snowy owl may perform multiple functions such as competitive exclusion of other males and advertising to females.

The calls of this species may carry exceptionally far in the thin air of Arctic, certainly over more than 3 km (1.9 mi), and maybe even to as much 10 to 11 km (6.2 to 6.8 mi) away. The female has a similar call to male but can be higher-pitched and/or more guttural as well as single notes which are often disyllabic, khuso. Female snowy owls have also been known to utter chirps and high screaming notes, similar to those of the nestlings. Both sexes may at times give a series of clucking, squeals, grunts, hisses and cackles, perhaps such as in circumstances when they are excited. The alarm call is a loud, grating, hoarse keeea.

Another raspier bark is recorded, sometimes called a "watchman's rattle" call, and may be transcribed as rick, rick, rick, ha, how, quack, quock or kre, kre, kre, kre, kre. A female attacking to protect her nest was recorded to let out a crowed ca-ca-oh call, whilst other owls attacking to protect the nest did a loud version of the typical call while circling before dropping down. They may also clap their beak in response to threats or annoyances. While called clapping, it is believed this sound may actually be a clicking of the tongue, not the beak.

Though largely only vocal in the breeding season, leading to some erroneous older accounts describing the snowy owl as completely silent, some vocalizations have been recorded in winter in the northern United States. Initially, the young of the snowy owl have a high pitched and soft begging call which develops into a strong, wheezy scream at around 2 weeks. At the point when the young owls leave the nest around 3 weeks, the shrill squeals they emit may allow the mothers to locate them.

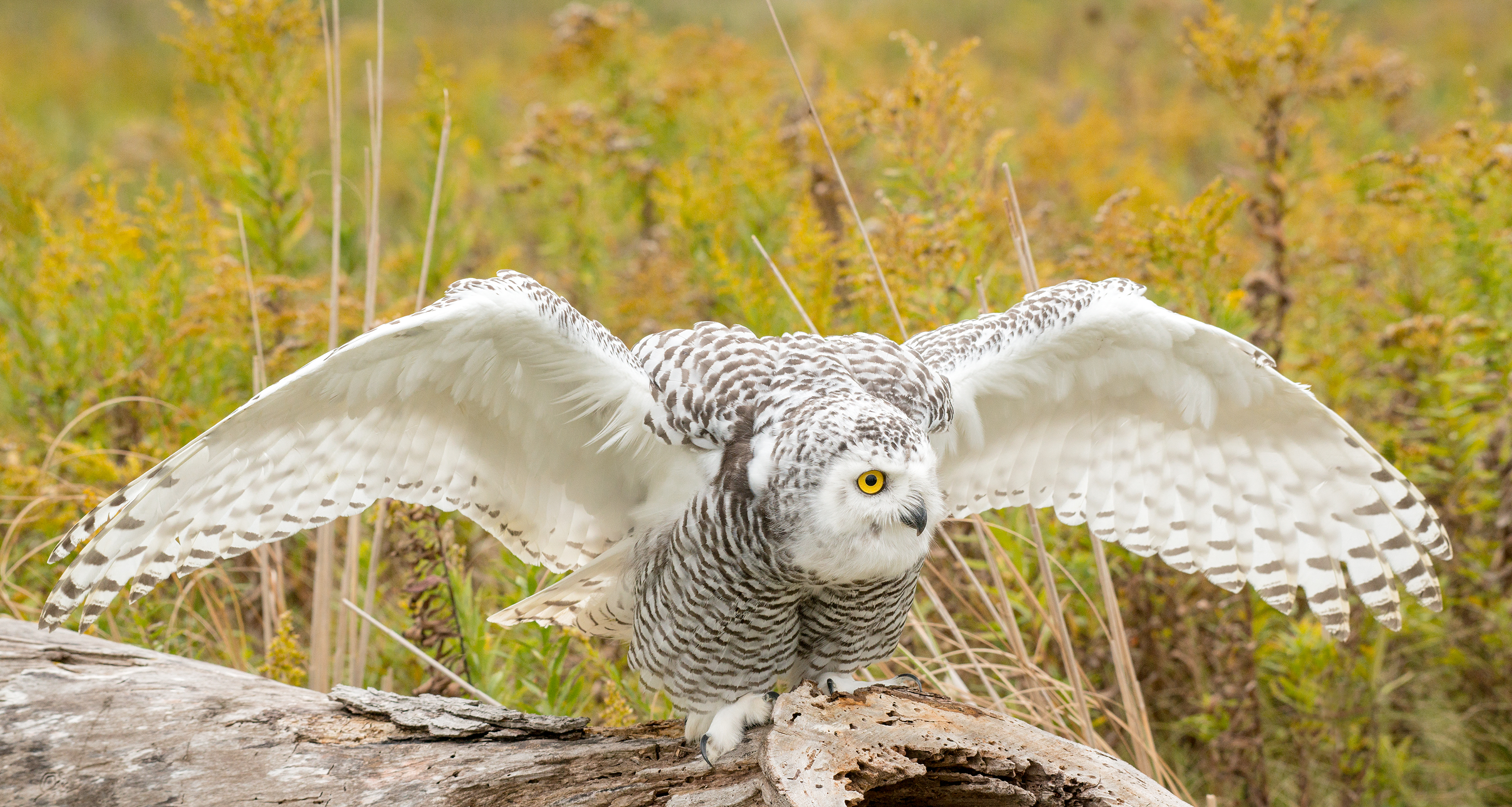
Juvenile snowy owl, about 12 weeks old

== Distribution and habitat ==
=== Breeding range ===
The snowy owl is typically found in the northern circumpolar region, where it makes its summer home north of latitude 60° north though sometimes down to 55 degrees north. However, it is a particularly nomadic bird, and because population fluctuations in its prey species can force it to relocate, it has been known to breed at more southerly latitudes. Although the total breeding range includes a little over 12,000,000 km^{2} (4,600,000 sq mi), only about 1,300,000 km^{2} (500,000 sq mi) have a high probability of breeding, i.e. breeding at no more than 3–9-year intervals. Snowy owls nest in the Arctic tundra of the northernmost stretches of Alaska, Northern Canada, and the Euro-Siberian region.

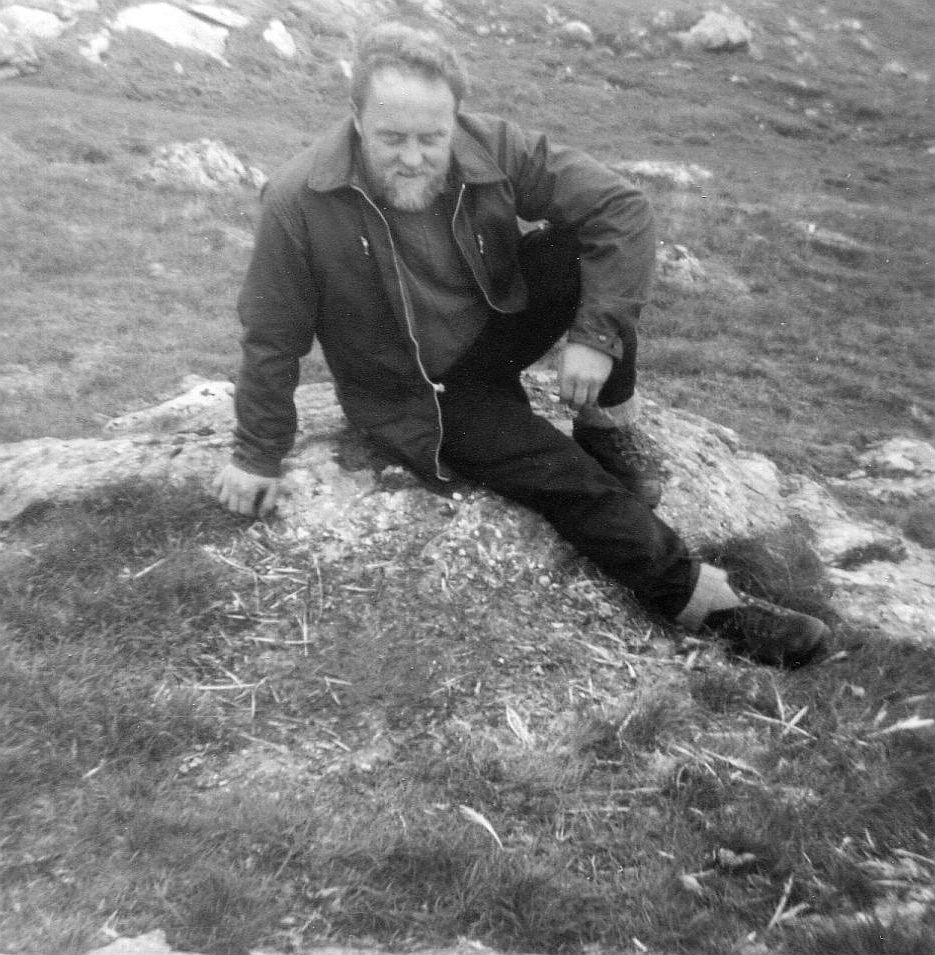
Bobby Tulloch, the Shetland RSPB warden, at the site of the snowy owl nest on the island of Fetlar, Shetland, in August 1967

Between 1967 and 1975, snowy owls bred on the remote island of Fetlar in the Shetland Isles north of mainland Scotland, discovered by the Shetland RSPB warden, Bobby Tulloch. Females summered as recently as 1993, but their status in the British Isles is that of a rare winter visitor to Shetland, the Outer Hebrides and the Cairngorms. Vagrant snowy owls have occasionally been found as far south as Lincolnshire. Older records show that the snowy owls may have once semi-regularly bred elsewhere in Shetland. They range in northern Greenland (mostly Peary Land) and, rarely in "isolated parts of the highlands", Iceland. Thence, they are found breeding at times across northern Eurasia such as in Spitsbergen and western and northern Scandinavia. In Norway, they normally breed in Finnmark and seldom down as far south as Hardangervidda and in Sweden perhaps down to the Scandinavian Mountains while breeding is very inconsistent in Finland.

They also range in much of northern Russia, including northern Siberia, Anadyr, Koryakland, Taymyr Peninsula, Yugorsky Peninsula, Sakha (especially the Chukochya River) and Sakhalin. Breeding has also been reported sporadically to the south in the Komi Republic and even the Kama River in southern Perm Krai. Although considered part of their regular range, the last breeding by snowy owls in the Kola Peninsula was in the early 1980s; similarly, breeding maps show the species in Arkhangelsk Oblast and the Pay-Khoy Ridge but no breeding records are known in at least 30 years in either. They range throughout most of the Arctic isles of Russia such as Novaya Zemlya, Severnaya Zemlya, New Siberian Islands, Wrangel Island, Commander and Hall Islands.

In North America, the breeding range has been known in modern times to include the Aleutian Islands (i.e. Buldir and Attu) and much of northern Alaska, most frequently from the Arctic National Wildlife Refuge to Utqiaġvik, and more sporadically down along the coastal-western parts such as through Nome, Hooper Bay, the Yukon Delta National Wildlife Refuge, and rarely even south to the Shumagin Islands. The snowy owl may breed extensively in northern Canada, largely making its home in the Arctic Archipelago. Their Canadian breeding range can include broadly Ellesmere Island up to Cape Sheridan, north coastal Labrador, the northern Hudson Bay, perhaps all of Nunavut (especially the Kivalliq Region), northeastern Manitoba, most of northern mainland and insular Northwest Territories (including the delta of the Mackenzie River) and northern Yukon Territory (where breeding is mostly confined to Herschel Island). Since breeding and distribution is very small, local and inconsistent in northern Europe, northern Canada and northern Alaska represent the core part of the breeding range for snowy owls along with several parts of northern and northeastern/coastal Russia.

=== Regular wintering range ===
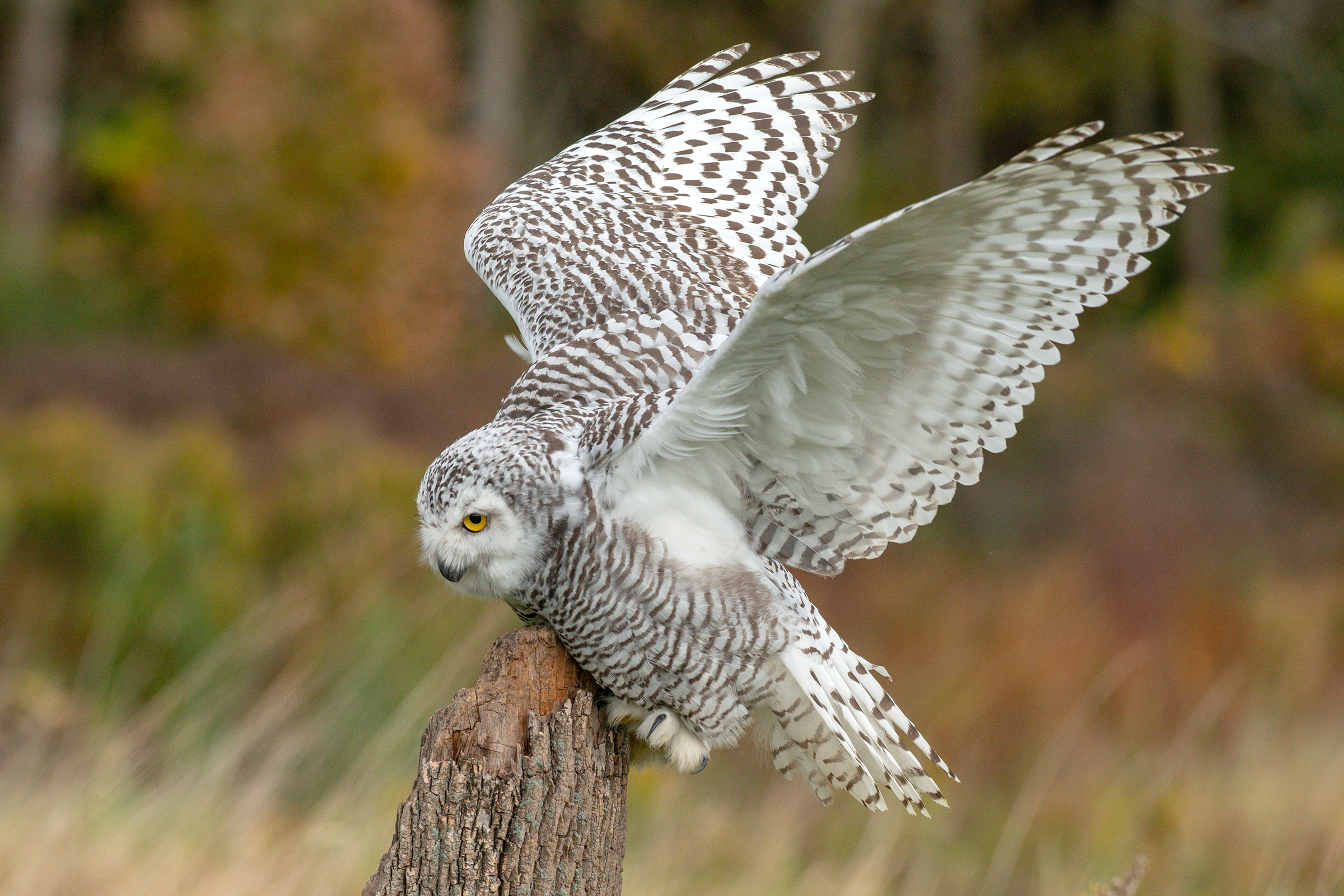
Female with wings extended, showing the wing structure.

During the winter months, many snowy owls leave the dark Arctic to migrate to regions further south. Southern limits of the regular winter range are difficult to delineate given the inconsistency of appearances south of the Arctic. Furthermore, not infrequently, many snowy owls will overwinter somewhere in the Arctic through the winter, though seldom appear to do so in the same sites where they have bred. Due in no small part to the difficulty and hazardousness of observation for biologists during these harsh times, there is very limited data on overwintering snowy owls in the tundra, including how many occur, where they winter and what their ecology is at this season.

The regular wintering range has at times been thought to include Iceland, Ireland and Scotland and across northern Eurasia such as southern Scandinavia, the Baltics, central Russia, southwestern Siberia, Sakhalin southern Kamchatka and, rarely, north China and sometimes the Altai Republic. In North America, they occasionally regularly winter in the Aleutian island chain and do so broadly and with a fair amount of consistency in much of southern Canada, from British Columbia to Labrador. Since at least the 1970s, research indicated that snowy owls regularly winter in several of the northern seas during wintertime, following the leads of sea ice as perching sites and presumably hunting mostly seabirds in polynyas.

In February 1886, a snowy owl landed on the rigging of the Nova Scotia steamship Ulunda on the edge of the Grand Banks of Newfoundland, over 800 km (31,000,000 in) from the nearest land. It was captured and later preserved at the Nova Scotia Museum. Surprisingly, some studies have determined that after a high lemming year in North America, a higher percentage of snowy owls were using marine environments rather than inland ones.

=== Irruptive range ===
Large winter irruptions at temperate latitudes are thought to be due to good breeding conditions resulting in more juvenile migrants. These result in irruptions occurring further south than the typical snowy owl range in some years. They have been reported, as well as in all northerly states in the contiguous states, as far south as Georgia, Kentucky, South Carolina, nearly all the Gulf Coast of the United States, Colorado, Nevada, Texas, Utah, California and even Hawaii. In January 2009, a snowy owl appeared in Spring Hill, Tennessee, the first reported sighting in the state since 1987. Also notable is the mass southern migration in the winter of 2011/2012, when thousands of snowy owls were spotted in various locations across the United States. This was then followed by an even larger mass southern migration in 2013/2014 with the first snowy owls seen in Florida for decades. The nature of irruptions is less well-documented in Eurasia, in part due to the paucity of this owl in the European side, but accidental occurrence, presumably during irruptions, has been described in the Mediterranean area, France, Crimea, the Caspian part of Iran, Kazakhstan, northern Pakistan, northwestern India, Korea and Japan. Stragglers may too turn up as far south as the Azores and Bermuda.

=== Habitat ===
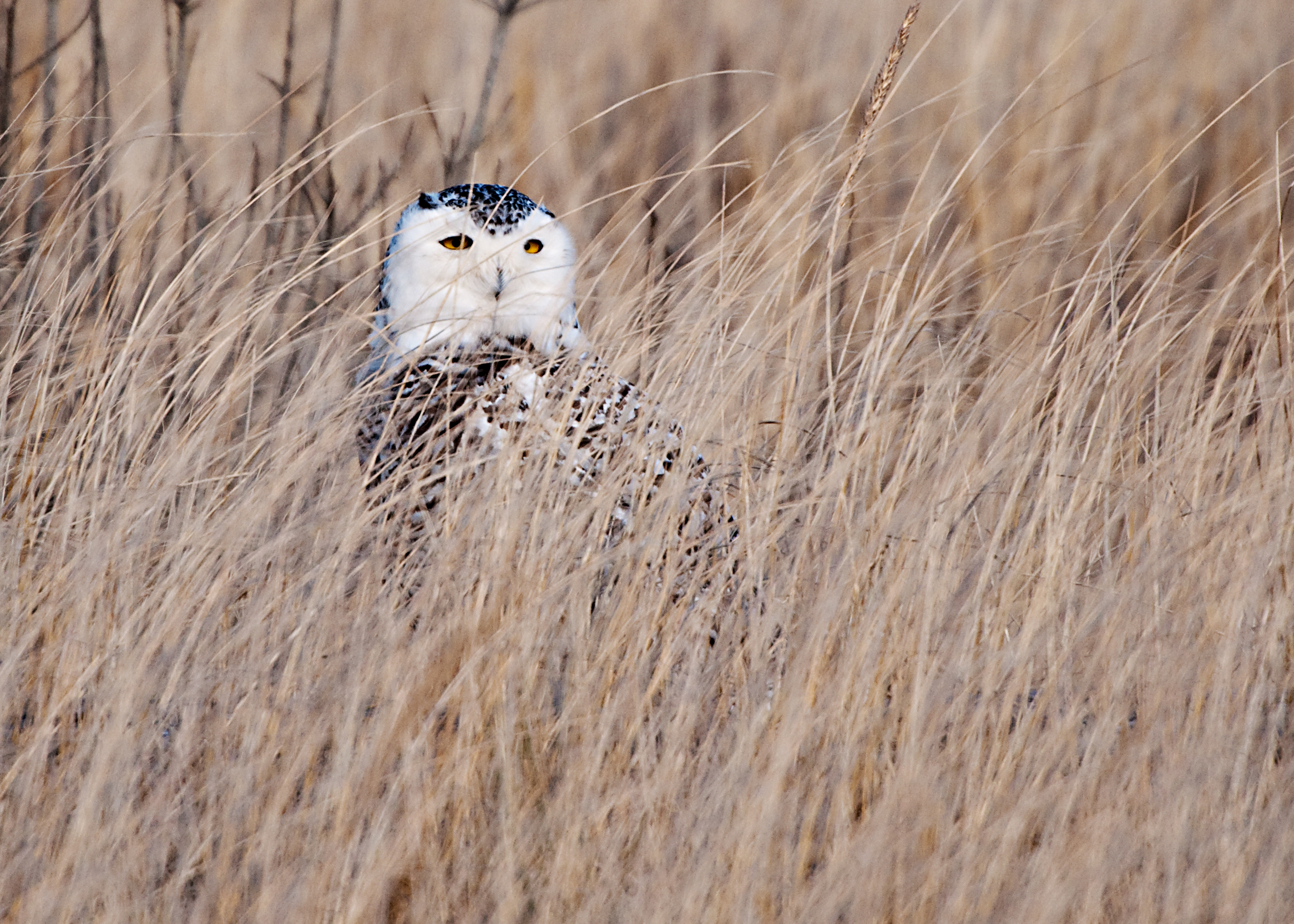
Snowy owls often seek out grassy and open habitats year around.

Snowy owls are one of the best known inhabitants of the open Arctic tundra. Frequently, the earth in snowy owl breeding grounds is covered with mosses, lichens and some rocks. Often the species preferentially occurs in areas with some rising elevation such as hummocks, knolls, ridges, bluffs and rocky outcrops. Some of these rises in the tundra are created by glacial deposits. The ground is usually rather dry in tundra but in some areas of the southern tundra can also be quite marshy. Not infrequently, they will also use areas of varied coastal habitat, often tidal flats, as a breeding site. Breeding sites are usually at low elevations, usually less than 300 m (980 ft) above sea level, but when breeding to the south in inland mountains, such as in Norway, they may nest at as high as 1,000 m (3,300 ft). Outside the breeding season, snowy owls may occupy nearly any open landscape.

Typically wintering sites are rather windswept with meager cover. These open areas can include coastal dunes, other coastal spots, lakeshores, islands, moorlands, steppes, meadows, prairies, other extensive grasslands and rather shrubby areas of the Subarctic. These may be favored due to their vague similarity to the flat openness of the tundra. Manmade open sites are perhaps even more used than natural ones, often agricultural fields and rangeland, as well as large areas of cleared forests. During irruption years when they are found in the northeastern United States, juveniles frequent developed areas including urban areas and golf courses, as well as the expected grasslands and agricultural areas that older birds primarily use.

On the plains of Alberta, observed snowy owls spent 30% of their time in stubble-fields, 30% in summer fallow, 14% in hayfield and the remainder of the time in pasture, natural grasslands and sloughs. The agricultural areas, large untouched by the farmers in winter, may have had more concentrated prey than the others in Alberta.

Perhaps the most consistently attractive habitat in North America to wintering snowy owls in modern times may be airports, which not only tend to have the flat, grassy characteristics of their preferred habitats but also by winter host a particular diversity of prey, both pests which rely on humans as well as wildlife attracted to the extensively grassy and marshy strips that dot the large airport vicinities. For example, Logan International Airport in Massachusetts has relatively one of the most reliable annual populations known in the United States in winter. All ages spend a fair amount of their time over water in the Bering Sea, the Atlantic Ocean and even the Great Lakes, mostly on ice floes. These marine and ocean-like freshwater areas were observed to account for 22–31% of habitat used in 34 radio-tagged American snowy owls over two irruptive years, with the tagged owls occurring a mean of 3 km (1.9 mi) from the nearest land (while 35–58% used the expected preferred habitats of grassland, pasture and other agricultural land).

== Behavior ==
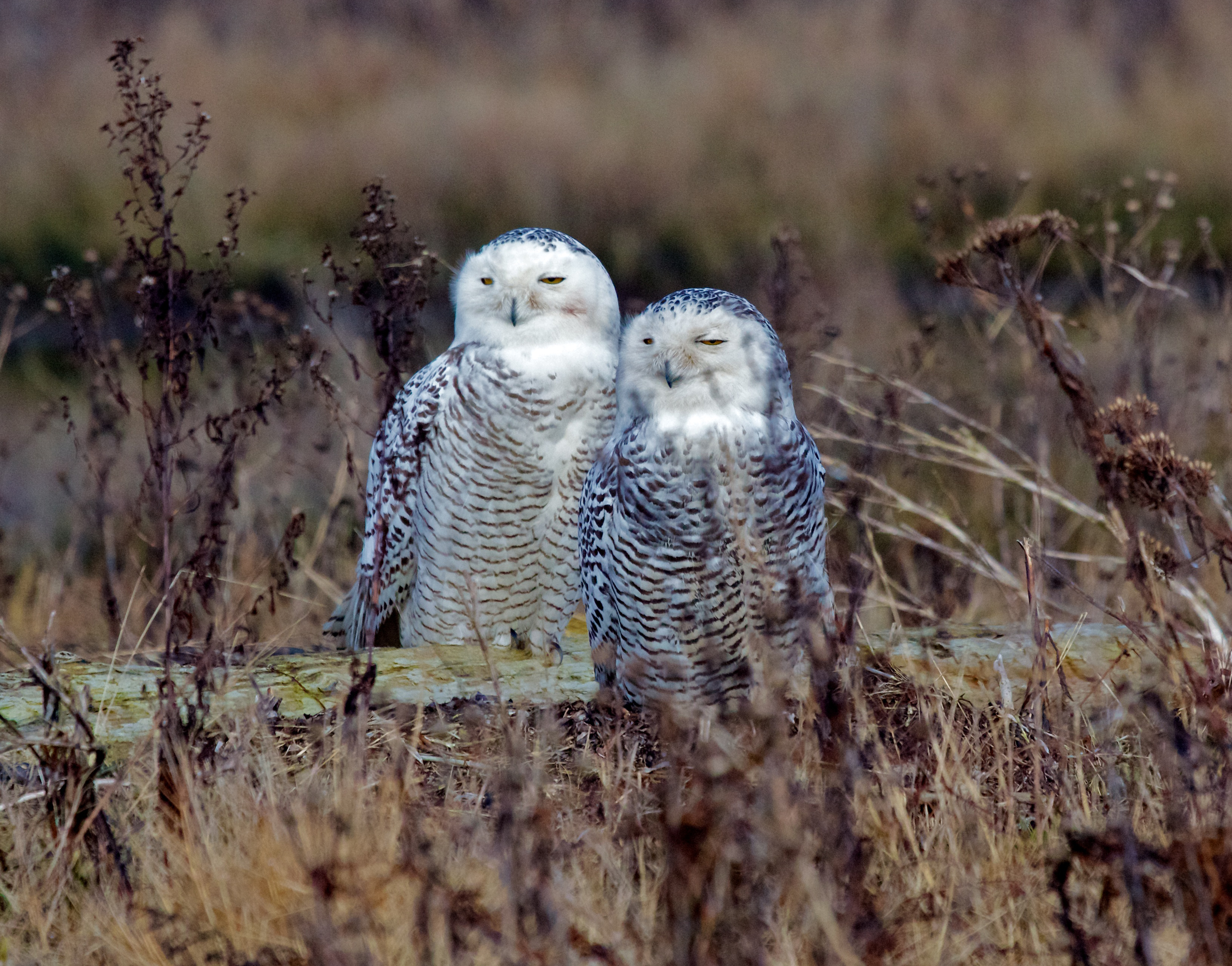
Juvenile owls do not mind associating with one another, especially during winter.

Snowy owls may be active to some extent at both day, from dawn to dusk, and night. Snowy owls have been seen to be active even during the very brief winter daytime in the northern winter. During the Arctic summer, snowy owls may tend to peak in activity during the twilight that is the darkest time available given the lack of full nightfall. Reportedly, the peak time of activity during summer is between 9:00 pm and 3:00 am in Norway. The peak time of activity for those owls that once nested on Fetlar was reported between 10:00 and 11:00 pm.

According to one authority, the least active times are at noon and midnight. As days become longer near autumn in Utqiaġvik, the snowy owls in the tundra become more active around nightfall and can often be seen resting during the day, especially if it is raining. During winter in Alberta, snowy owls were tracked in the daytime, despite being also active at night (as they were deemed too difficult to track). In the study, they were most active during 8:00–10:00 am and 4:00–6:00 pm and often rested mostly from 10:00 am to 4:00 pm. The owls were perched for 98% of observed daylight and seemed to time their activity to peak times for rodents. The variation of activity is probably in correspondence with their primary prey, the lemmings, and like them, the snowy owl may be considered cathemeral. This species can withstand extremely cold temperatures, having been recorded in temperatures as low as minus 62.5 degrees Celsius with no obvious discomfort and also withstood a 5-hour exposure to minus 93 degrees Celsius but may have struggled with oxygen consumption by the end of this period. The snowy owl has perhaps the second lowest thermal conduction to the plumage on average of any bird after only the Adelie penguin (Pygoscelis adeliae) and rivals the best insulated mammals, such as Dall sheep (Ovis dalli) and Arctic fox, as the best insulated polar creature. Presumably as many as seven rodents would need to be eaten daily to survive an extremely cold winter's day.

Adults and young both have been seen to shelter behind rocks to shield themselves from particularly harsh winds or storms. Snowy owls often spending a majority of time on the ground, perched mostly on a slight rise of elevation. It has been interpreted from the morphology of their skeletal structure (i.e. their short, broad legs) that snowy owls are not well-suited to perching extensively in trees or rocks and prefer a flat surface to sit upon. They may perch more often in winter, doing so mainly when hunting, at times on hummocks, fenceposts, telegraph poles by roads, radio and transmission towers, haystacks, chimneys and the roofs of houses and large buildings. Rocks may be used as perches at times in all seasons. Though often relatively sluggish owls, like most related species, they are capable of sudden dashing movements in various contexts.

Snowy owls can walk and run quite quickly, using outstretched wings for balance if necessary. This owl flies with fairly rowing wingbeats, occasionally interrupted by gliding on stretched wings. The flight is fairly buoyant for a Bubo owl. When displaying, the male may engage in an undulating flight with interspersed wingbeats and gliding in a slight dihedral, finally dropping rather vertically to the ground. They are capable for swimming but do not usually do so. Some seen to be swimming were previously injured but young have been seen to swim into water to escape predators if they cannot fly yet. They will also drink when unfrozen water is available. Snowy owl mothers have been observed to preen their young in the wild, while pairs in captivity have been observed to allopreen. In the period leading up to breeding, snowy owls switched regularly between searching (for nesting grounds) and loafing, often searching less when snow cover was less extensive.

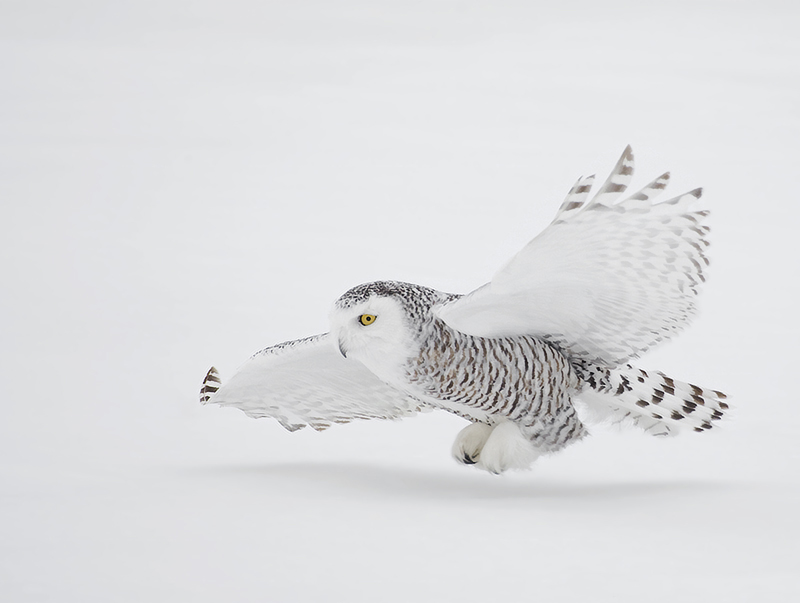
Snowy owls are often somewhat ponderous in movements but can be surprisingly and suddenly fast on the wing.

Snowy owls will fight with conspecifics in all seasons occasionally but this is relatively infrequent during breeding and rarer still during winter. Dogfights and talon interlocking may ensue if the fight between two snowy owls continues to escalate. A study determined that snowy owls are able to orient the whitest parts of their plumage towards the sun, spending about 44% of time oriented as such during sunny days and much less on cloudy days. Some authors interpret this as a presumed signal to conspecifics, but thermoregulation could also be a factor. It is known that during winter in Alberta that female snowy owls are territorial towards one another and may not leave an area for up to 80 days but males are nomadic, usually only staying 1–2 days in an area (seldom to 3–17 days). The females spent on average seven times as long in a given area than did males.

During threat displays, individuals will lower the front of the body, stretch the head low and forward, with partially extended wings and feathers on the head and raise their back. If continuously threatened or cornered, the posture in the threat display may become still more contoured and, if pressed, the owl will lie back and attempt to slash with its large talons. The threat displays of males are generally more emphatic than those of females. Although snowy owls have been considered as semi-colonial, they do not appear to fit this mold well. Nesting sites can be loosely clustered but this is a coincidental response to concentrated prey and each pair tends to be somewhat intolerant of each other. During winter, snowy owls are usually solitary but some aggregations have been recorded, especially nearer the Arctic when more narrow food selection can lead to up to 20–30 owls gathering in an area of about 20 to 30 ha (49 to 74 acres). Congregations were also recorded in the winter in Montana, where 31–35 owls wintered in a 2.6 km^{2} (1.0 sq mi) area, owls mostly grouped in loose aggregations of 5–10 owls each or occasionally side-by-side or about 20 m (66 ft) apart.

In extreme cases in Utqiaġvik, the owls may have exceptionally close active nests that may be down to only 800 to 1,600 m (2,600 to 5,200 ft) apart. Juvenile males appear to be especially prone to loose associations with one another, appearing to be non-territorial and able to hunt freely in front of one another. In a 213 km^{2} (82 sq mi) area in and around Utqiaġvik, productive years may have about 54 nests while none may be found in poor years. Utqiaġvik may have about 5 owls in early summer every 1.6 km (0.99 mi), have a nest spacing of 1.6 to 3.2 km (0.99 to 1.99 mi) and the owls territory size is about 5.2 to 10.2 km^{2} (2.0 to 3.9 sq mi). In Churchill, Manitoba, nest spacing averaged about 3.2 km (2.0 mi).

In Southampton Island in a year when the owls nested there, nest spacing averaged 3.5 km (2.2 mi), with the closest two 1 km (0.62 mi) apart and density per nest was 22 km^{2} (8.5 sq mi). In Nunavut, densities could go from 1 owl per 2.6 km^{2} (1.0 sq mi) in a productive year to 1 owl per 26 km^{2} (10 sq mi) in a poor year and from 36 nests in a 100 km^{2} (39 sq mi) area to none at all. Owl density on Wrangel Island in Russia was observed be a single bird each 0.11 to 0.72 km^{2} (0.042 to 0.278 sq mi).

The first known study of winter territories took place in Horicon Marsh where owls ranged from 0.5 to 2.6 km^{2} (0.19 to 1.00 sq mi) each. In Calgary, Alberta, mean territory size of juvenile females in winter was 407.5 ha (1,007 acres) and adult females was 195.2 ha (482 acres). Wintering owls in central Saskatchewan were radio-monitored, determining that 11 males had an average range of 54.4 km^{2} (21.0 sq mi), while that of 12 females was 31.9 km^{2} (12.3 sq mi) with the combined average being 53.8 km^{2} (20.8 sq mi).

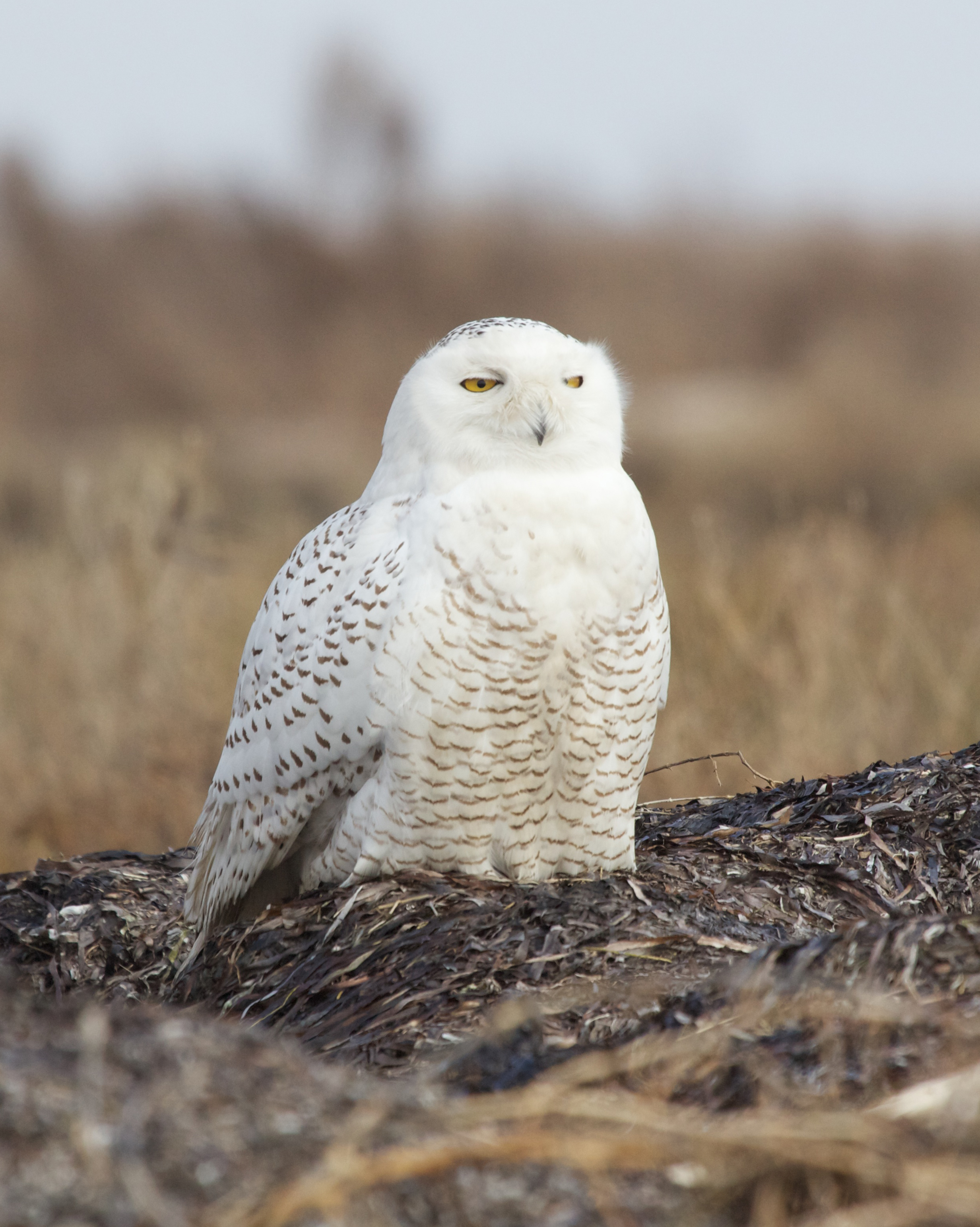
Snowy owls are usually awake, aware and not infrequently active during daytime.

=== Migration ===
It is fair to say that the snowy owl is a partial, if fairly irregular, migrant, having a very broad but patchy wintering range. 1st year birds tend to disperse farther south in winter than older owls with males wintering usually somewhat more to the south than females of equivalent ages, adult females often wintering the farthest north. The snowy owl likely covers more ground than almost any other owl in movements but many complex individual variations are known in movements, and they often do not take the traditional north–south direction that might be assumed. Migratory movements appear to be somewhat more common in America than in Asia. A study of wintering owls in the Kola Peninsula determined that the mean date of arrival of owls was 10 November with a departure date of 13 April, covering an average of 991 km (616 mi) during the course of the wintering period and clustering where prey was more concentrated.

Some variety of movements recorded each autumn and snowy owls winter annually in plains of Siberia and Mongolia and prairies and marshlands of Canada. The Great Plains area of southern Canada host wintering snowy owls about 2 to 10 times more frequently than other areas of the continent. Some weak correlation has made with individuals having some level of fealty to certain wintering sites. Wintering snowy owls, a total of 419, recorded in Duluth, Minnesota from 1974 to 2012 would occur in larger numbers in years where rats were more plentiful. The amount of individual returns among 43 Duluth-wintering owls was fairly low in subsequent winters (8 for 1 year, a small handful in the next few years, and 9 in non-consecutive years).

Sometimes surveys appeared to reveal hundreds of wintering snowy owls on coastal sea ice during an irruptive year. Three siblings that hatched in same nest in Cambridge Bay were recovered in drastically different spots at least a year later: one in eastern Ontario, one in Hudson Bay and one in Sakhalin Island. A nestling banded in Hordaland was recovered 1,380 km (860 mi) to the northeast in Finnmark. In the Logan Airport, 17 of 452 owls were recorded to return, eleven the following year, three two years later, and then singles variously six, ten and 16 years later. A banded female from Utqiaġvik was recorded to migrate over 1,928 km (1,198 mi) along seacoast down to Russia, returning over 1,528 km (949 mi) and covering at least 3,476 km (2,160 mi) in total. Another banded young female from Utqiaġvik went to the same Russian areas, returned to Utqiaġvik and then onto Victoria Island, but did appear to breed, while another also covered a similar route but ended up nesting on Banks Island. Another female migrated to the Canada–United States border, then moved back to the Gulf of Alaska, then to winter in the same border areas and then finally to both Banks and Victoria Island.

Snowy owls from the Canadian Arctic were monitored to have covered an average of 1,100 km (680 mi) in one autumn then covered an average of 2,900 km (1,800 mi) a year later. In late winter, owls from the same area were found to have covered a mean of 4,093 km (2,543 mi) of ground in the tundra and spent a mean of 108 days, apparently searching for a suitable nesting situation the entire time.

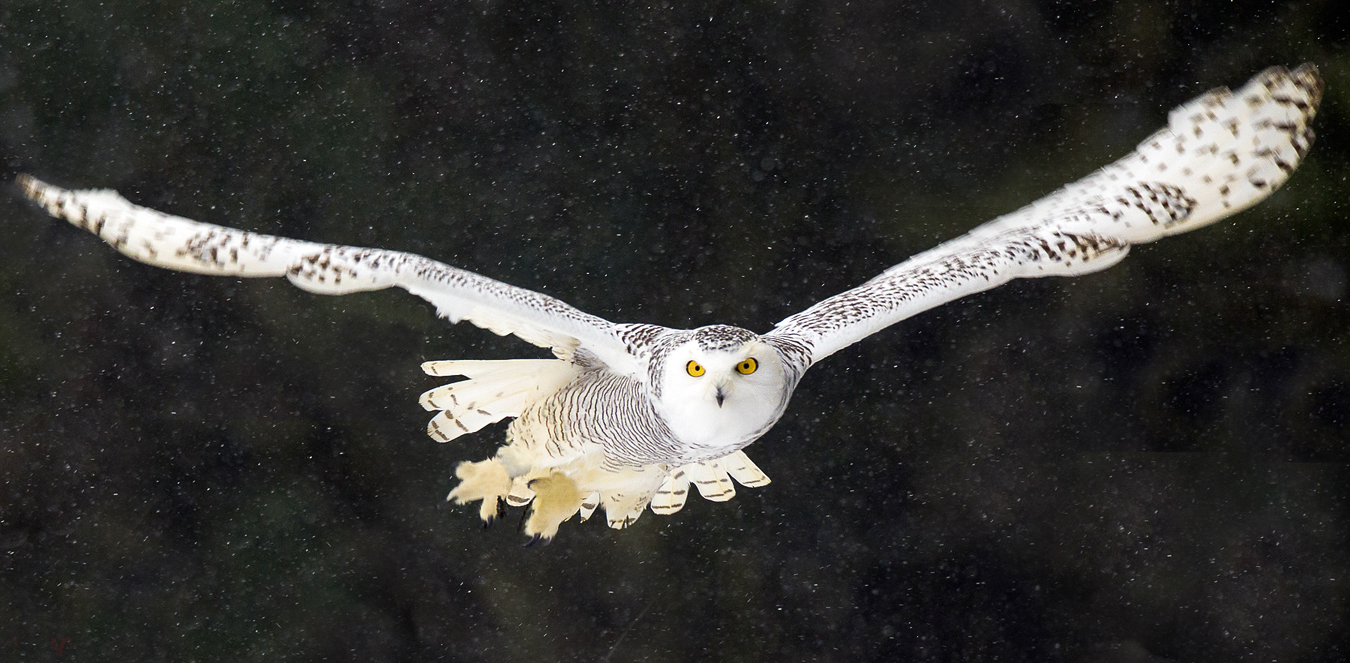
Snowy Owl in Flight, Captive

In no fewer than 24 winters between 1882 and 1988, large numbers have occurred in Canada and the United States. These were irruption years. Record breeding irruptive years were recorded in the winters of 2011–2012 and 2014–2015. In the 1940s, it was calculated that the mean gape in time between large irruptions was 3.9 years. Southbound movements as such are much more conspicuous after peak vole years, once thought to be separated by periods of around 3–7 years. However, more extensive research has weakened the argument that irruptions are entirely food-based and the data indicates that irruptive movements are far from predictable. This is because a statewide survey in Alaska found no statewide synchrony in lemming numbers. Therefore, rather than decline of lemmings, it is the successful productivity of several pairs that plays the role, resulting in a large number of young owls that then irrupt. However, the snowy owls cannot breed in high numbers unless lemmings are widely available on the tundra. This connection of irruptions to high years of productivity was confirmed in a study by Robillard et al. (2016). About 90% of the snowy owls seen in irruptive years from 1991 to 2016 that were ageable were identified as juveniles.

== Diet and hunting ==
=== Hunting techniques ===
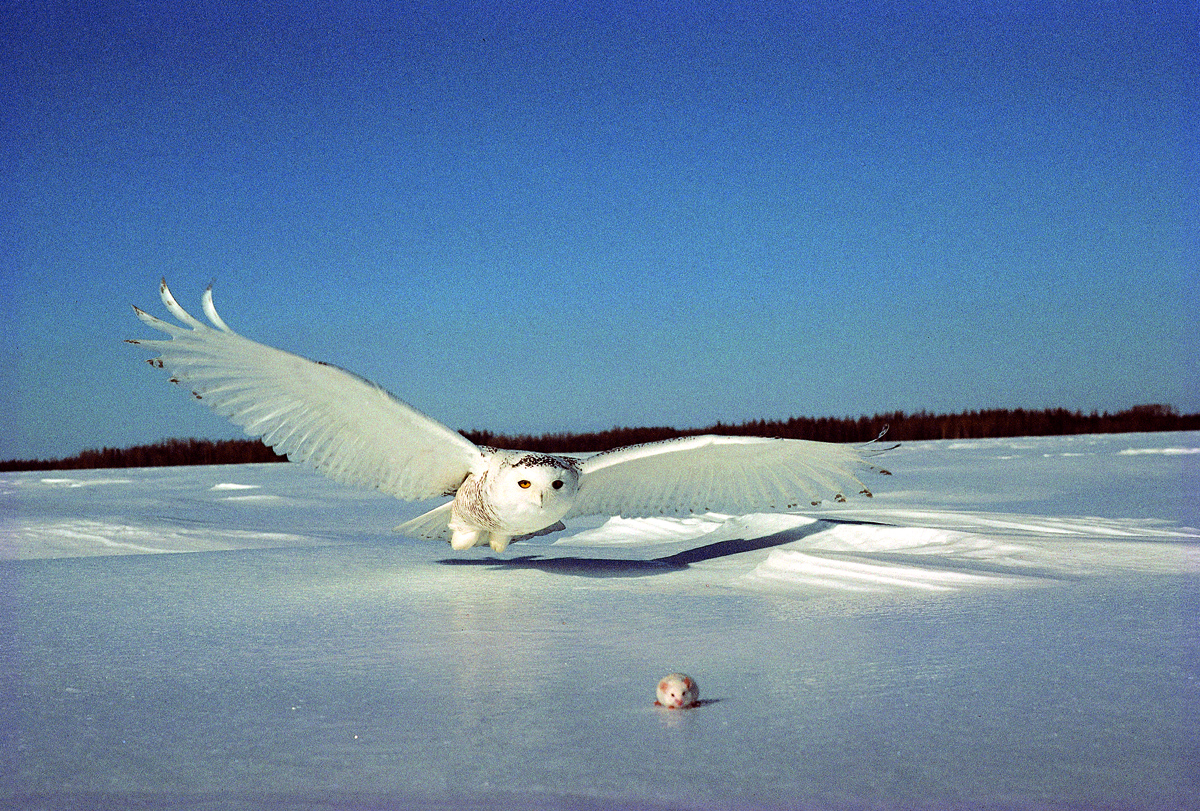
A snowy owl engaging in the "sweep" hunting method.

Snowy owls may hunt at nearly any time of the day or night, but may not attempt to do so during particularly severe weather. During the summer solstice, the owls appear to hunt during "theoretical nightfall". Night-vision devices have allowed biologists to observe that snowy owls hunt quite often during the extended nighttime during the northern winter. Prey are both taken and eaten on the ground. Like other carnivorous birds, Snowy owls often swallow their small prey whole. Strong stomach juices digest the flesh, while the indigestible bones, teeth, fur, and feathers are compacted into oval pellets that the bird regurgitates 18 to 24 hours after feeding. Regurgitation often takes place at regular perches, where dozens of pellets may be found. Biologists frequently examine these pellets to determine the quantity and types of prey the birds have eaten. When large prey are eaten in small pieces, pellets will not be produced. Larger prey is often torn apart, sometimes including removal of the head, with the large muscles, such as the humerus or breast, typically eaten first. The scattering of remains that results from the increment feeding on larger prey is thought to result in under-identification of them compared to smaller prey items.

The aptitude for hunting by day, hunting from the ground and hunting in almost always completely open and treeless areas are the primary ways in which the snowy owl differs in hunting from other Bubo owls. Otherwise, the hunting habits are similar. It is thought, due to their less refined hearing compared to other owls, prey is usually perceived via vision and movement. Experiments indicate that snowy owls can detect prey from as far as 1.6 km (0.99 mi) away. Snowy owls generally use a rise or, occasionally, a perch while hunting. 88% of observed 34 hunts in Utqiaġvik were undertaken from an elevated watch-site (56% mounds or rises, 37% telephone poles). Their hunting style may recall that of buzzards, with the hunting owl sitting rather low and perching immobile for a long spell. Although their usual flight is a slow, deliberate downbeat on the broad, fingered wings, when prey is detected from their perch, flight may be undertaken with a sudden, surprisingly quick accelerated style with interspersed wing beats. In Utqiaġvik, snowy owls may most frequently engage in a brief pursuit hunting style. In high winds capable of keeping their bulk aloft, snowy owls may too engage in a brief hovering flight before dropping onto prey.

When hunting fish, apparently, some snowy owls will hover in a style reminiscent of the osprey (Pandion haliaetus), although in at least one other case a snowy owl was observed to capture fish by lying on its belly upon a rock by a fishing hole. A dashing stoop or pounce down onto their prey, ending in a high-impact "wallop", is fairly commonly recorded. Another common technique is the "sweep", wherein they fly by and grasp the prey while continuing to fly. In winter, snowy owls have been shown to be able to "snow plunge" to capture prey in the subnivean zone, under at least 20 cm (7.9 in) of snow. Perhaps least frequently, snowy owls may pursue their prey on foot, in doing so never taking wing.

Snowy owls have been known to capture night-migrating passerines and shorebirds, sometimes perhaps on the wing, as well as large and/or potentially dangerous birds that were caught in air by snowy owls during daylight. On the wing pursuits against other various other carnivorous birds are sometimes undertaken as well to kleptoparasitize the prey caught by the other birds. Few variations of hunting technique were observed in winter observations from Alberta, almost all of the hunts being with the sit-and-wait method (also known as still-hunts). Adult females in Alberta had a considerably better hunting rate than juvenile females.

Much as in Alberta, in Syracuse, New York, 90% of 51 hunts were still-hunting, with the sweep variant used after perch departure in 31% of hunts and the pounce method in 45% of hunts. The Syracuse-wintering owls used tall perches, a mixture of manmade objects and trees of around 6 m (20 ft) high, in nearly 61% of hunts, while nearly 14% were from low perches (i.e. fence-posts, snow banks and scrap piles) about half as high as the tall perches and started from a ground position nearly 10% of the time. In Sweden, males hunted from a perch more so than did females and adults both focused on significantly smaller prey (small mammals) and may have had more success hunting than juvenile snowy owls. Some snowy owls can survive a fast for up to about 40 days off of fat reserves. These owls were found to have extremely thick subcutaneous fat deposits of 19 to 22 mm (0.75 to 0.87 in) and it is likely owls that overwinter in the Arctic rely heavily on these to survive during this scarce time, in combination with lethargic, energy-conserving behavior.

Snowy owls may not infrequently exploit prey inadvertently provided or compromised by human activities, including ducks injured by duck hunters, birds maimed by antenna wires, various animals caught in human traps and traplines as well as domestic or wild prey being bred or farmed by humans in enclosures.

A wide variety of accrued reports show that the snowy owl that scavenging on carrion is not uncommon (despite having once been thought to be very rare in all owls), including instances of reindeer (Rangifer tarandus) body parts brought to nests and owls following polar bears to secondarily feed on their kills. Even huge marine mammals such as walrus (Odobenus rosmarus) and whales can be fed upon by these owls when the opportunity occurs. Snowy owls produce a pellet that in different areas averages a median of about 80 mm × 30 mm (3.1 in × 1.2 in), averaging up to 92 mm (3.6 in) in length as in Europe.

=== Prey spectrum ===
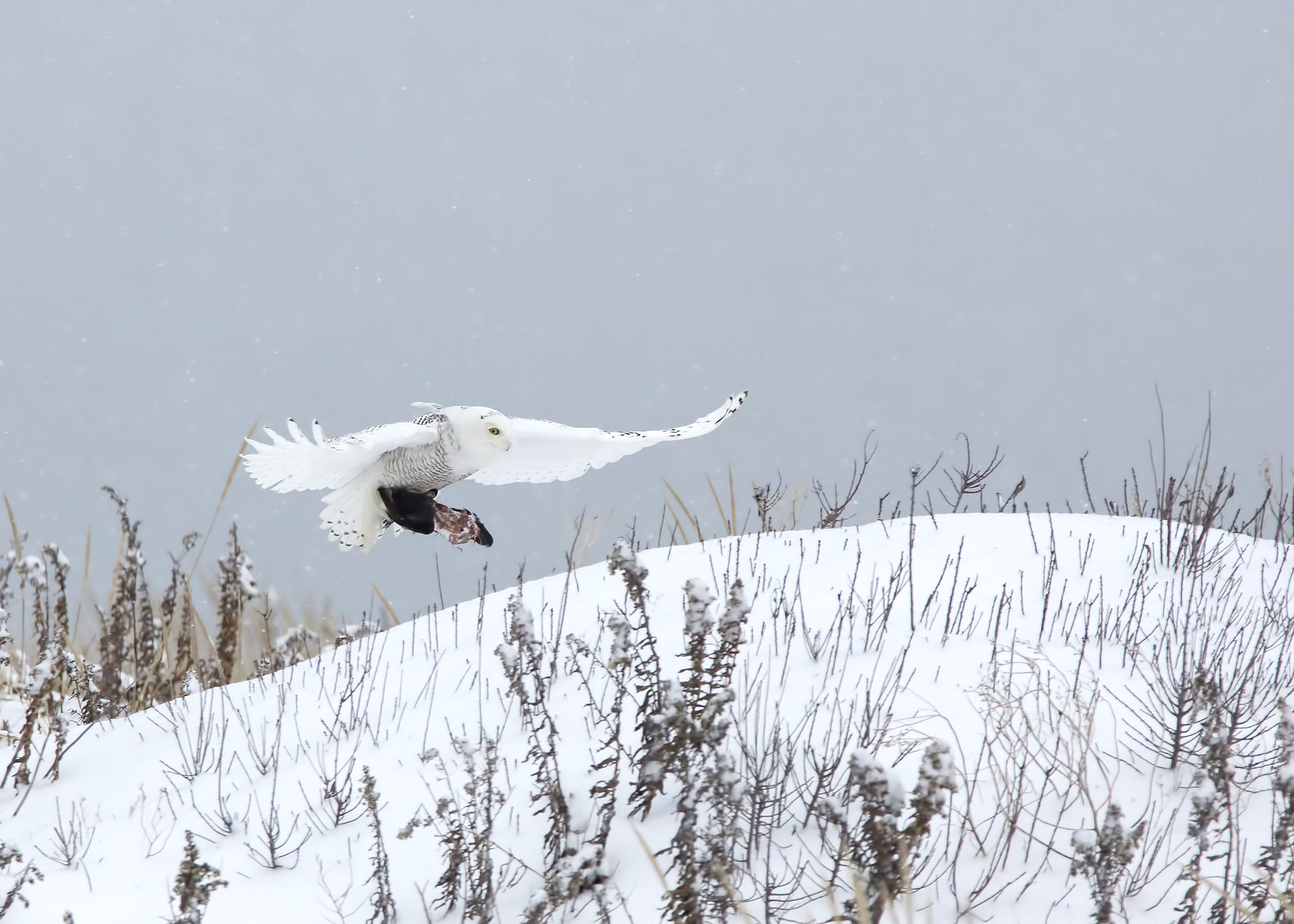
A snowy owl flying with an unidentified prey item in winter.

The snowy owl is primarily a hunter of mammals. Most especially, they often live off of the northerly lemmings. Sometimes other similar rodents like voles and mice can also be found frequently in the snowy owl's foods. It is R-selected, meaning that it is an opportunistic breeder capable of taking advantage of increases in prey numbers and diversity, despite its apparent specialization. Birds are commonly taken as well, and may regularly include passerines, northern seabirds, ptarmigan and ducks, among others. Sometimes infrequent consumption of other prey such as beetles, crustaceans and occasionally amphibians and fish is reported (of these only fish are known to have been identified to prey species). It also takes carrion outside the breeding season. All told, more than 200 prey species have been known to be taken by snowy owls around the world.

Generally, like other large owls (including even bigger owls like the Eurasian eagle-owl), prey selection tends toward quite small prey, usually small mammals, but they can alternate freely with prey that is much larger than typical given the opportunity or even bigger than themselves, including relatively large mammals and several types of large bird of almost any age. One study estimated for the biomes of Alaska and Canada, mean prey sizes for snowy owls were 49.1 g (1.73 oz), in western North America, the mean prey size was 506 g (1.116 lb) and in eastern North America was 59.7 g (2.11 oz), while the mean prey size in northern Fennoscandia was similar (at 55.4 g (1.95 oz)).

The mean number of prey species for snowy owls per biome ranged from 12 to 28. The opportunistic nature of snowy owls has long been known during their primarily winter observed feeding habits (leading to their unpopular nature and frequent persecution well into the 20th century).

=== Summer diet ===
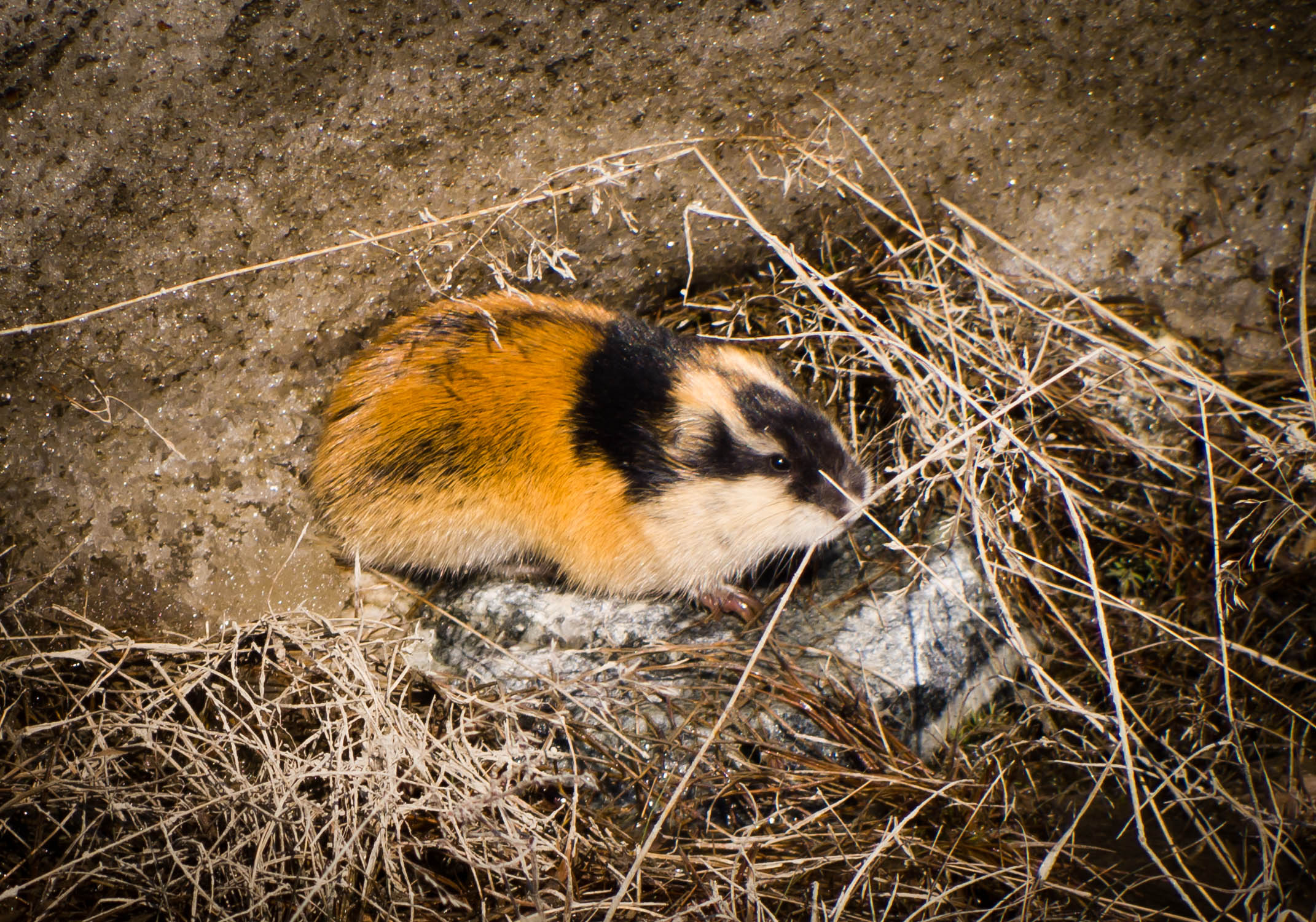
Lemmings such as Norway lemmings are the primary prey of breeding snowy owls.

The snowy owl's biology is closely tied to the availability of lemmings. These herbivorous rodents are largish members of the vole clan that are the predominant mammal of the tundra ecosystem alongside the reindeer and probably make up the majority of the mammalian biomass of the ecosystem. Lemmings are key architects of the soil, microtopography and plant life of the entire tundra. In the American lower Arctic areas, brown lemming of the Lemmus genus are predominant and tend to be found in lower, wetter habitats (feeding by preference on grasses sedges and mosses) while collared lemmings of the Dicrostonyx genus were in more arid, often higher elevation habitats with heathland and ate by preference willow leaves and forbs. The southerly brown lemmings behave differently than more northern collared lemming type, increasing almost limitlessly within preferred habitat whereas the collared type tends to spread to suboptimal habitats and therefore does not appear reach the high regional densities of the brown.

Authorities generally agree that there appears to be no synchrony between the brown and collared lemmings and the feeding access of snowy owls is irregular as a result, but snowy owls can likely alternate between the two lemming types as one or the other increases as they nomadically use different parts of the Arctic. It is possible that the rare coincidental mutual peak of both lemming types within a year results in the erratic high productivity that results in irruptions. Within individual Arctic lemming species, historically, populations can vary in rough 4- to 5-year trends. As a result, in areas such as Banks Island, the breeding rate of snowy owls can vary within a decade by about tenfold. Weights of lemmings taken can range from 30 to 95 g (1.1 to 3.4 oz) on Baffin Island, while those taken in Utqiaġvik averaged 70.3 and 77.8 g (2.48 and 2.74 oz) in female and male lemming, respectively. It was estimated based on captive daily food intake that a snowy owl may consume about 326 g (11.5 oz) of lemmings a day, though other estimates using voles show a daily need for about 145 to 150 g (5.1 to 5.3 oz). On Southampton Island, 97% of the diet was lemmings. A very similar number of lemmings (nearly 100%) were found over 25 years of study in Utqiaġvik, amongst 42,177 cumulative prey items. Of 76 lemmings that could be identified to sex at a cache, male lemmings were found in the cache twice as often as female lemmings. While initial findings indicated on Wrangel Island that female lemmings outnumbered males in prey remains, to the contrary osteology indicated that, like Utqiaġvik, males were more often taken. However, the slightly larger, slower-moving females may be preferred when available.

In some areas, snowy owls can breed where lemmings are uncommon to essentially absent. Even in Utqiaġvik, where the diet is quite homogenously based in lemmings, the hatching of passerines, shorebirds, seabirds and waterfowl can provide a key resource when lemmings are not found regularly and may be the only means by which the young can survive at such lean times. In the Nome, Alaska area, the locally nesting snowy owls reportedly switched from lemmings to ptarmigans when the latter's chicks hatched. A somewhat varying diet was also reported in Prince of Wales Island, Nunavut where 78.3% of the biomass was lemmings, with 17.8% from waterfowl, 3.3% from weasel and about 1% from other birds. In Fennoscandia, among 2,700 prey items only a third were Norway lemmings (Lemmus lemmus) and a majority were voles at 50.6%, probably largely the tundra vole (Microtus oeconomus). A more detailed glance at Finnish Lapland showed that amongst 2,062 prey items, 32.5% of the foods were Norway lemmings (though in some years the balance could range up to 58.1%), 28% were grey red-backed voles (Myodes rufocanus) and 12.6% were tundra voles, with birds constituting a very small amount of the prey balance (1.1%).

In northern Sweden, a more homogenous diet was found with the Norway lemming constituting about 90% of the foods. In the Yamal Peninsula, 40% of the diet was collared lemmings, 34% were Siberian brown lemming (Lemmus sibiricus), 13% were Microtus voles and ptarmigan and ducks both constituting 8% and with other birds making up much of the remaining balance. In some parts of the tundra, snowy owls may opportunistically prey upon Arctic ground squirrels (Spermophilus parryii). In the Hooper Bay area (much farther south than they usually nest), various rodents, in highland areas, and waterfowl, in marshland, were taken while breeding.

When historically breeding on Fetlar in Shetland, the main prey for snowy owls was European rabbits (Oryctolagus cuniculus), Eurasian oystercatcher (Haematopus ostralegus), parasitic jaegers (Stercorarius parasiticus) and Eurasian whimbrel (Numenius phaeopus), in roughly that order, followed by other bird species with most (rabbits and secondary birds) prey taken as adults but for the oystercatchers and jaegers which were taken largely as fully grown but only recently fledged juveniles. 22–26% of oystercatcher and jaeger young in the island were estimated to be taken by snowy owls.

Bird predation by nesting snowy owls is highly opportunistic. Willow (Lagopus lagopus) and rock ptarmigan (Lagopus muta) of any age are often fairly regular in the diet of breeding snowy owls but they cannot be said to particularly specialize on these. Evidence was found in the Yamal Peninsula that the snowy owls became the primary predator of willow ptarmigan and that the predation was so frequent, it may have been the cause of the change of their habitat usage to willow thickets by the local ptarmigan. The reliance on ptarmigan has caused some conservation trickle-down concern for the owls because ptarmigan are hunted in large numbers, with the hunters of Norway permitted to cull up to 30% of the regional population.

In North America, avian prey on the breeding ground regularly varies from small passerines like snow buntings (Plectrophenax nivalis) and Lapland longspurs (Calcarius lapponicus) to large waterfowl like king (Somateria spectabilis) and common eider (Somateria mollissima) and usually the goslings but also occasionally adults of geese such as brants (Branta bernicla), snow geese (Anser caerulescens) and cackling geese (Branta hutchinsii). Drake eiders of often similar size to the owls themselves are not infrequently the largest prey amongst remains around the nest mound. One nest had the bodies of all eiders that attempting to nest in the vicinity around it. The threatened and declining Steller's eider (Polysticta stelleri) when nesting in the Utqiaġvik area would appear to avoid the vicinity of snowy owl nests when selecting their own nesting sites due to the predation risk. Intermediately sized seabirds are often focused on in lieu of available lemmings. Foods were studied intensively in Iceland. Among 257 prey items found with a total prey mass of 73.6 kg (162 lb), birds made up 95% of the diet. The leading prey were adult rock ptarmigan, at 29.6% by number and 55.4% by biomass and adult European golden plover (Pluvialis apricaria), at 10.5% by number and 7.2% biomass. The rest of the balance was largely other shorebirds, which were taken slightly more often as chicks than adults. Pink-footed geese (Anser fabalis) were taken in equal number as goslings and adults, with respectively estimated average weights at these ages of 800 and 2,470 g (1.76 and 5.45 lb).

On the isle of Agattu, the diet consisted entirely of birds, as there are no mammals found there. The much favored food in Agattu was the ancient murrelet (Synthliboramphus antiquus), at 68.4% of the biomass and 46% by number, while the secondary prey were followed numerically by smaller Leach's storm-petrels (Oceanodroma leucorhoa) (20.8%) and Lapland longspurs (10%) and in biomass by smallish ducks, the green-winged teal (Anas carolinensis) and harlequin duck (Histrionicus histrionicus) (13.4% biomass collectively). In the Murman Coast of Russia, also in the absence of lemmings, seabirds formed the largest part of the diet.

=== Winter diet ===
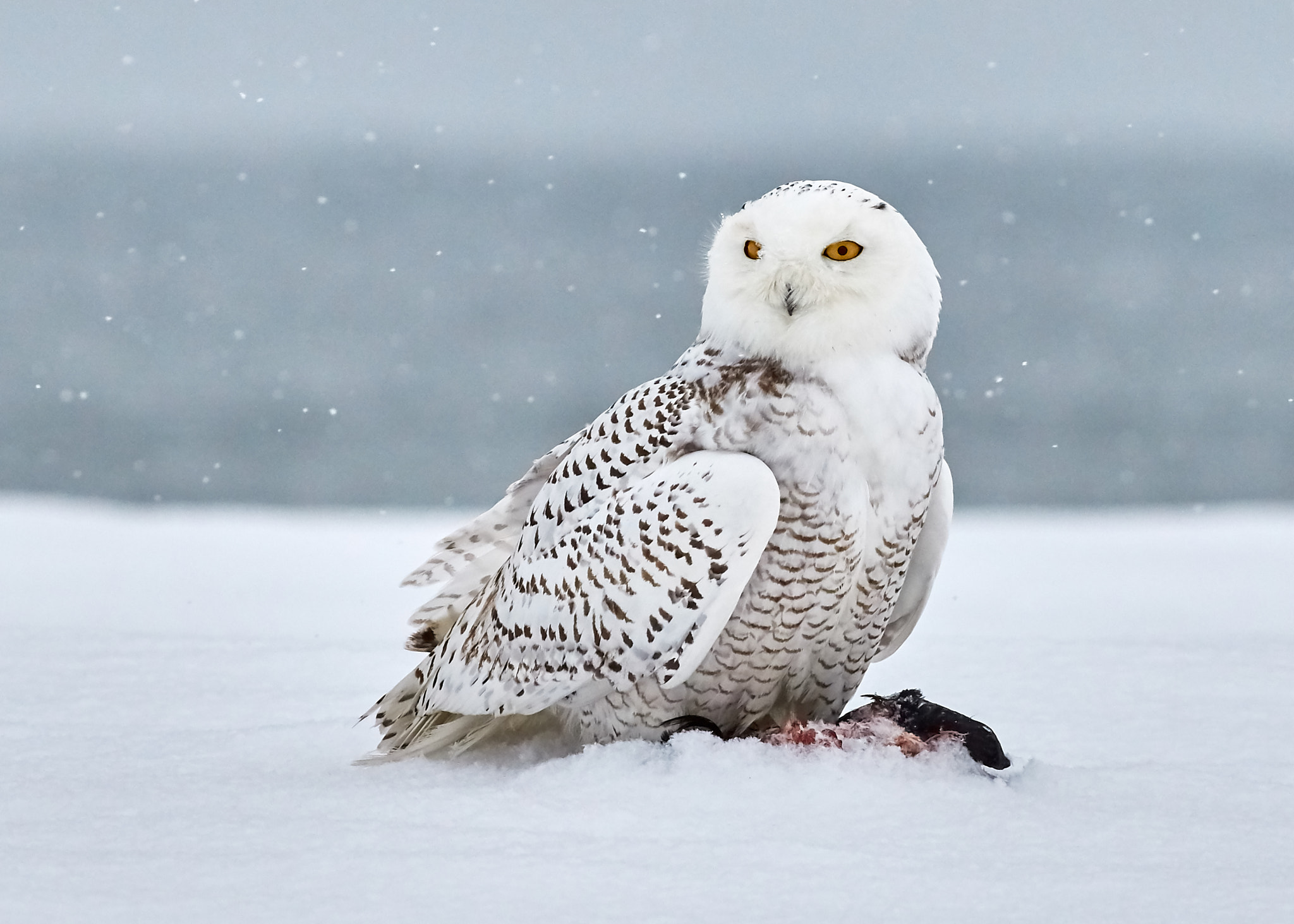
Snowy owl with prey.

On the wintering grounds, mammals often predominate in the snowy owl's food inland doing so less in coastal areas. Overall wintering snowy owls eat more diverse foods they do whilst breeding, furthermore coastal wintering snowy owls had more diverse diets than inland ones. As in summer, moderately sized water birds such as teal, northern pintail (Anas acuta) and numerous alcids and the like are often focused on when hunting birds. The diet in 62 pellets, amongst at least 75 prey items, from coastal Oregon showed the main foods as black rat (Rattus rattus) (at an estimated 40%), red phalarope (Phalaropus fulicarius) (31%) and bufflehead (Bucephala albeola) (19%). Witnessed attacks were mostly upon buffleheads in Oregon.

In coastal southwestern British Columbia, the diet among 139 prey items was 100% avian. The predominant prey were water birds, mostly snatched directly from surface of the water and largely weighing 400 to 800 g (0.88 to 1.76 lb), i.e. buffleheads (at 24% by number and 17.4% by biomass of foods) and horned grebes (Podiceps auritus) (at 34.9% by number and 24.6% by biomass), followed by variously other water birds, often the slightly larger species of glaucous-winged gull (Larus glaucescens) and the American wigeon (Mareca americana). A different study of this area also showed the predominance of ducks and other water birds to wintering snowy owls here, although Townsend's vole (Microtus townsendii ) (10.65%) and snowshoe hare (Lepus americanus) (5.7%) were also notably in a sample of 122 prey items.

During winter, snowy owls consume more strongly nocturnal prey than lemmings such as Peromyscus mice and northern pocket gophers (Thomomys talpoides). In southern Alberta, 248 prey items were found with North American deermouse (Peromyscus maniculatus), at 54.8% by number, and meadow voles (Microtus pennsylvanica), at 27% by number, as the main foods of snowy owls over two years. Other prey in Alberta were grey partridge (Perdix perdix) (at 5.79% of total), jackrabbits, weasels and owls. Richardson's ground squirrels (Urocitellus richardsonii) were consumed heavily in the Alberta study in a brief converged times of hibernation emergence and overwintering snowy owls. The sexual dimorphism in prey selection was also studied here, with male owls mainly focusing exclusively on the small rodents, females also took the same rodents but supplemented the diet with all alternate and larger prey. Overall, the meadow and montane voles (Microtus montanus) constituted 99% of over 4500 prey items in Montana. In Horicon Marsh in winter, 78% of the diet was meadow vole, with 14% being muskrats (Ondatra zibethicus), 6% ducks and smaller balances of rats and other birds.

Snowy owls found in Michigan took meadow voles for 86% of the diet, white-footed mouse (Peromyscus leucopus) for 10.3% and northern short-tailed shrew (Blarina brevicauda) for 3.2%. Of 127 stomachs in New England in four irruptive winters from 1927 to 1942, of 155 prey items, 24.5% were brown rats, 11.6% were meadow voles and 10.3% were dovekie (Alle alle), with a smaller balance of snowshoe hare and birds from snow buntings to American black ducks (Anas rubripes). During the same years, stomach contents in Ontario included 40 identified prey items, led by brown rats (20%), white-footed mice (17.5%) and meadow voles (15%); of 81 prey items from Pennsylvania in 60 stomachs that were not empty, eastern cottontail (Sylvilagus floridanus) (32%), meadow vole (11.1%), domestic chicken (Gallus gallus domesticus) (11.1%) and northern bobwhite (Colinus virginianus) (5%) were the most often identified prey species. Introduced common pheasants were found to be somewhat more vulnerable than native American gamebirds like ruffed grouse due to their tendency to crouch rather than flush when approached by a flighted predator like the snowy owl in a glade or field. Some snowy owls wintering on rocky coasts and jetties were known in New England to live almost entirely off of purple sandpipers (Calidris maritima). The availability of brown rats may draw snowy owls to seemingly unattractive settings such as garbage dumps and under bridges. Meanwhile, snowy owls wintering in Lowell, Massachusetts were seen to live largely off of rock doves (Columba livia) caught off of buildings. Of 87 prey from stomachs in Maine, 35% were rats or mice, 20% were snowshoe hares and 10% were passerines. A small study of 20 prey items in an irruptive winter in Kansas found that 35% of the prey were red-winged blackbird (Agelaius phoeniceus), 15% prairie voles (Microtus ochrogaster) and 10% each by American coot (Fulica americana) and hispid cotton rats (Sigmodon hispidus).

On the isle of St. Kilda, 24 pellets were found for non-breeding snowy owls that stayed through the early summer. Of 46 prey items, the St Kilda field mouse (Apodemus sylvaticus hirtensis) was predominant by number at 69.6% but constituted 16.8% of biomass while adult Atlantic puffin (Fratercula arctica) constituted 63.5% of the prey biomass and 26% by number (rest of the balance being juvenile puffins and great skuas (Stercorarius skua)). The main subspecies of wood mouse was similarly dominant in the diet within County Mayo, Ireland and were presumably snatched at night due to their strict nocturnality. In Knockando, the winter diet was led by European rabbits (40.1%), red grouse (Lagopus lagopus scotica) (26.4%) and adult mountain hare (Lepus timidus) (20.9%) (in 156 pellets); in Ben Macdui, the diet was led by rock ptarmigan (72.3%), field voles (Microtus agrestis) and juvenile mountain hare (8.5%) (33 pellets); in Cabrach, the diet was led by red grouse (40%), mountain hare (20%) and European rabbit (15%) (16 pellets).

Among 110 prey items found for snowy owls found wintering during irruption in southern Finland, all but 1 prey item were field voles (the only other prey being a single long-tailed duck (Clangula hyemalis)). Far to the east, wintering owls in the Irkutsky District were found to subsist mostly on narrow-headed voles (Microtus gregalis). In a wintering population in Kurgaldga Nature Reserve of Kazakhstan, the main foods were grey red-backed voles at 47.4%, winter white dwarf hamster (Phodopus sungorus) at 18.4%, steppe pika (Ochotona pusilla) at 7.9%, muskrat at 7.9%, Eurasian skylark (Alauda arvensis) at 7.9%, grey partridge at 5.3%, and both steppe polecat (Mustela eversmanii) and yellowhammer (Emberiza citrinella) at 2.6%. On the Kuril Islands, wintering snowy owls' main foods were reported as tundra voles, brown rats, ermines, and whimbrel, in roughly that order.

While most of the prey species are relatively small, snowy owls can prey on a fairly diverse size of birds and mammals. Data from the Logan Airport in over 6,000 pellets shows that meadow vole and brown rats predominated the diet in the area, supplanted by assorted birds both small and large. American black ducks were primarily taken among bird species with other birds taken here including relatively large and diverse species up to the size of Canada geese (Branta canadensis) and great blue herons (Ardea herodias) along with brants, American herring gulls (Larus argentatus), double-crested cormorants (Phalacrocorax auritus). Additionally, other birds as large as western capercaillie (Tetrao urogallus) (of both sexes), greater sage-grouse (Centrocercus urophasianus), yellow-billed loons (Gavia adamsii) and cygnets of Bewick's swans (Cygnus columbianus bewickii) can be taken by snowy owl.

Among large mammalian prey species, snowy owls prey on both young and adults of large leporids such as Arctic hare (Lepus arcticus), Alaskan hare (Lepus othus), mountain hare and white-tailed jackrabbits (Lepus townsendii). At the other end of the scale, the snowy owl has been known to take birds down to the size of 19.5 g (0.69 oz) dark-eyed juncos (Junco hyemalis) and mammals down the size of 8.1 g (0.29 oz) common shrews (Sorex araneus). Fish are rarely taken anywhere but the snowy owl has been known to prey upon Arctic char (Salvelinus alpinus) and lake trout (Salvelinus namaycush).

=== Interspecific predatory relationships ===
A waterlogged snowy owl in winter victim to the very swift mobbing of a peregrine falcon.

The snowy owl is in many ways a unique owl and differs from other species of owl in its ecological niche. Only one other owl, the short-eared owl, is known to breed in the High Arctic. However, the snowy owl shares its primary prey, the brown and collared lemmings, with a number of other avian predators. In sometimes differing parts of the Arctic, competing predators for lemmings are, in addition to short-eared owls, pomarine jaegers (Stercorarius pomarinus), long-tailed jaegers (Stercorarius longicaudus), rough-legged buzzards (Buteo lagopus), hen harriers (Circus cyaenus), northern harriers (Circus hudsonius) and generally less specialized gyrfalcons (Falco rusticollis), peregrine falcons (Falco peregrinus), glaucous gulls (Larus hypoboreus) and common ravens (Corvus corax). Certain carnivorous mammals, especially the Arctic fox and, in this region, the ermine, are also specialized to hunt lemmings.

Most of the lemming predators are intolerant of the competition given the scattered nature of lemming populations and will displace and/or kill one another given the chance. However, given the need to conserve energy in the extreme environment, the predators may react passively to one another. When unusually breeding south in the Subarctic such as western Alaska, Scandinavia and central Russia, the number of predators with which the snowy owls are obligated to share prey and compete with may be too numerous to name. The taking of the young and eggs of snowy owls has been committed by a large number of predators: hawks and eagles, the northern jaegers, peregrine and gyrfalcons, glaucous gulls, common ravens, Arctic wolves (Canis lupus arctos), polar bears, brown bears (Ursus arctos), wolverines (Gulo gulo) and perhaps especially the Arctic fox. Adult snowy owls on the breeding grounds are far less vulnerable and can be justifiably qualified as an apex predator. Instances of the killing of adult snowy owls on the breeding grounds have been witnessed to be committed by a pair of pomarine jaegers on an incubating adult female snowy owl (possibly merely a competitive attack as she was left uneaten) and by an Arctic fox that killed an adult male snowy owl.

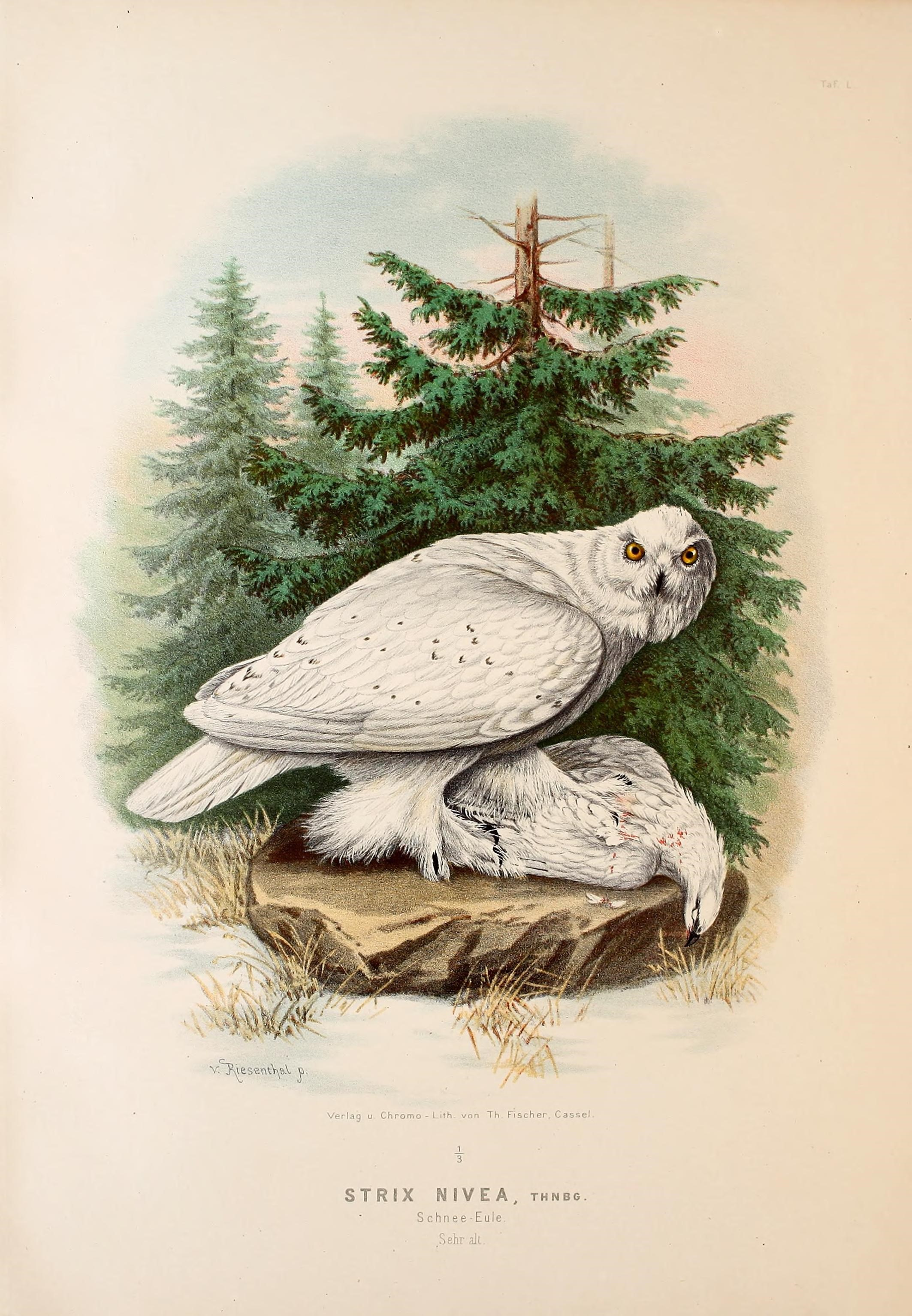
An early illustration showing snowy owl predation upon a gyrfalcon.

When it goes south to winter outside of the Arctic, the snowy owl has the potential to interact with a number of additional predators. By necessity, it shares its wintertime diverse prey with a number of formidable predators. These are known to include their cousins, the great horned owl and the Eurasian eagle-owl. They are relieved of heavy competition from the related species by differing temporal activity, i.e. being more likely to actively hunt in the daytime, and by habitat, using rather more open (quite often nearly treeless) habitats than them. During a study of wintering snowy owls in Saskatchewan, the authors indicated that the snowy owls may avoid areas inhabited and defended by great horned owls. Although they usually occurred here outside of an 800 m (2,600 ft) radius of central great horned owl ranges, they did not avoid the 1,600 m (5,200 ft) radius and different habitat usage may be a dictating factor. Given their mildly slighter size, it is unlikely that great horned owls (unlike the larger eagle-owl) would regularly dominate snowy owls in interactions and either species may give way to others depending on the size and disposition of the owls involved. Little study has been undertaken into the trophic competition of snowy owls with other predators during winter and, due to their scarcity, few predators are likely to expel much energy on competitive interactions with them, although many other predators will engage in anti-predator mobbing of snowy owls. Largely in winter, snowy owls have been the victim of a number of larger avian predators, though attacks are likely to be singular and rare. Instances of predation on snowy owls are known to have been committed several times in winter only by Eurasian eagle-owls.

Additionally, golden eagles (Aquila chrysaetos) have been known to prey on snowy owls as well as all northern sea eagles: the bald (Haliaeetus leucocephalus), white-tailed (Haliaeetus albicilla) and Steller's sea eagles (Haliaeetus pelagicus). Snowy owls are also sometimes killed by birds that are mobbing them. In one instance, a peregrine falcon killed a snowy owl in a stoop after the owl had killed a fledgling falcon. Anecdotal reports indicate predation by gyrfalcons (on snowy owls of unknown age and condition) but it was possibly also an act of mobbing. In another, a huge throng of Arctic terns (Sterna paradisaea) relentlessly swarmed and attacked a snowy owl until it met its demise.

Almost certainly more often than being a victim of other predators, snowy owls are known to dominate, kill and feed on a large diversity of other predators. Snowy owls, much like other Bubo owls, will opportunistically kill other birds of prey and predators. Although they will readily plunder the nests of other raptorial birds given the opportunity, most predations are on full-grown raptorial birds during winter due to the scarcity of raptor nests in the open tundra. In addition, most competing predators of the Arctic, except the very large mammals, are probably vulnerable to a hungry snowy owl. In data from the Logan Airport alone over different winters, the snowy owls were observed to have preyed upon an impressive diversity of other raptorial birds: rough-legged buzzards, American kestrels (Falco sparverius), peregrine falcons, barn owls, other snowy owls, barred owls (Strix varia), northern saw-whet owls (Aegolius acadicus) and short-eared owls.

While owls are likely encountered during corresponding hunting times, it is likely that the swift falcons are usually ambushed at night (much as other Bubo owls will do). In both the tundra and the wintering ground, there are several accounts of predation by snowy owls on short-eared owls. In addition, snowy owls have been known to prey on northern harriers, northern goshawks (Accipiter gentilis) and gyrfalcons. Snowy owls are also capable of taking large mammalian carnivores. Both juvenile and adult Arctic foxes have been known to fall prey to snowy owls, while predation by snowy owls on red foxes was reported in the Irkutsky District of Russia.

A wintering snowy owl in Saskatchewan was observed to have preyed on an adult red fox (Vulpes vulpes) weighing around 6 kg (13 lb) which may be the largest known prey known for snowy owls. Other relatively large carnivoran prey include adult house cat (felis catus), American mink (Mustela vision), and striped skunk (Mephitis mephitis). Also, several members of the weasel family, both small and relatively large, are known to be opportunistically hunted by snowy owls.

As a result of its potential predator status, the snowy owl is frequently mobbed at all times of the year by other predatory birds, including fierce dive-bombing by several of the northern falcons on the wintering grounds, including even by the relatively tiny but fierce and very agile merlin (Falco columbarius). The much bulkier snowy owls cannot match the speed and flight ability of a falcon and may be almost relentlessly tormented by some birds such as peregrines.

== Breeding ==
=== Pair bond and breeding territory ===
In Utqiaġvik, of 239 recorded breeding attempts, 232 were monogamous, the other 7 social bigamy. On Baffin Island, 1 male bred with 2 females and sired 11 total fledged young. Another case of bigamy was reported in Norway where the 2 females bred to one male were 1.3 km (0.81 mi) apart in nest site location. On Fetlar from 1967 to 1975, a male bred with two females, 1 younger and was possibly his own daughter. In the Fetlar males first time breeding with both females, he did not bring food to the younger female. However, when older female disappeared the following year, the male and younger female producing 4 young, but disappeared the subsequent year altogether in 1975. There are also unconfirmed cases of polyandry, with 1 female being fed by 2 males. Snowy owls can breed once per year but when food is scarce many do not even attempt to breed.

Despite frequent wandering in search of food, they generally adhere more to a strict breeding season than short-eared owls nesting in the tundra. 9 radio-tagged female snowy owls about Bylot Island were tracked to study how pre-laying snow cover affects their searching behavior for breeding areas. These tracked females searched an average of 36 days and covered an average of 1,251 km (777 mi). It is thought that the male and female mutually find an attractive breeding spot independently and converge. The breeding territory normally averages about 2.6 km^{2} (1.0 sq mi) as in both Baffin Island and Ellesmere Island but varies depending on the abundance of food and density of owls. Nesting territories on Baffin Island average in the range of 8 to 10 km^{2} (3.1 to 3.9 sq mi) during poor lemming years. Nesting territories may be up to 22 km^{2} (8.5 sq mi) on Southampton Island, with a mean distance of 4.5 km (2.8 mi) between active nests. In Utqiaġvik, nesting pairs can vary from none to at least seven, with territories averaging 5 to 10 km^{2} (1.9 to 3.9 sq mi) and mean nest distances of 1.5 to 6 km (0.93 to 3.73 mi).

In the Norwegian highlands, nesting occurs only in times of plenty at distances of 1.2 to 3.7 km (0.75 to 2.30 mi) between nests, averaging 2.1 km (1.3 mi). Males mark territory with singing and display flights, and likely always initiates. During the display, a male engages in exaggerated wing beats with a shallow undulating and bouncy courtship flight with wings held in a dihedral. He often drops to the ground but then flies again to only glide gently back down. Overall, the flight is somewhat reminiscent of the flight of a moth. A female will answer her mate with her song during courtship. While courting, the male often also carries a lemming in his bill, then bows with cocked tail, similarly as in related owls (seldom displaying some other prey like snow buntings). He then flaps his wings open in an emphatic manner, with the ground display being relatively brief (about five minutes). The female may refuse to breed if this ritual not performed. A possible courtship was engaged in by a male in southern Saskatchewan when a female was sighted.

On Southampton Island, at least 20 males were observed in late May in a high lemming year. Nesting territory defense displays, not highly different from courtship displays, include undulating flight and stiffly raised wings with bouts of exaggerated, delayed wing beats, looking like enormous white moths exposing their white wings under the sun. At times, competing males will interlock claws in mid-air. Territorial and nuptial displays are followed by a ground display by the male with the wings arched up in an "angel" posture, visible for well over a mile.

=== Nest sites ===
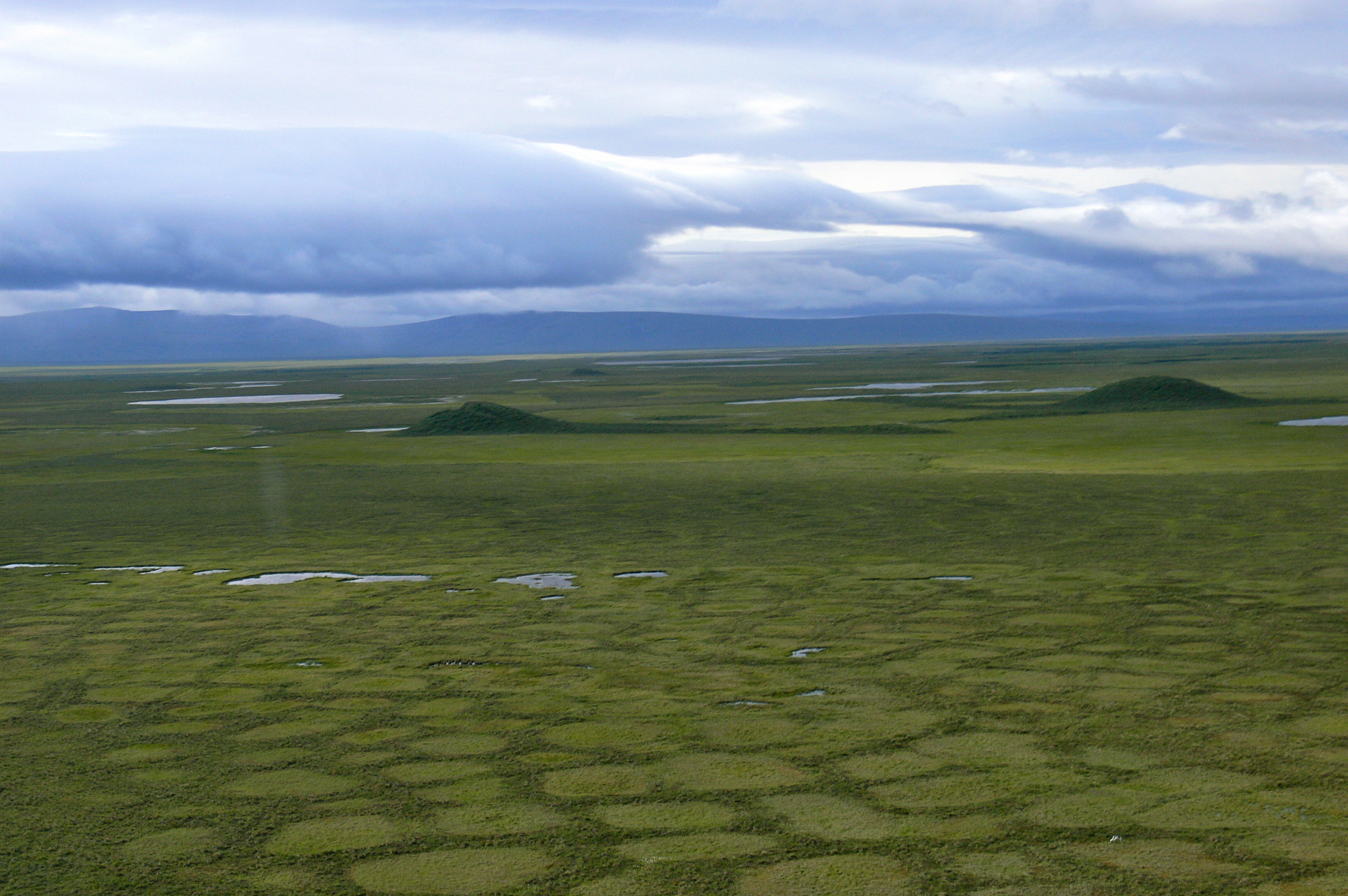
Snowy owls often seek out polygons such as these in the tundra.

Most individuals arrive at the nest site by April or May with a few overwintering arctic exceptions. Males advertises potential nest sites to his mate by scratching the ground and spreading his wings over it. The nest is usually a shallow depression on a windswept eminence in the open tundra. There seems to be a variety of qualifiers for appropriate nest sites. The nest site is typically snow-free and dry relative to the surrounding environment, usually with a good view of the surrounding landscape. The nest may be made of ridges, elevated mounds, high polygons, hummocks, hills, human-made mounds and occasionally rocky outcrops. If covered with vegetation, taller plants that may obstruct view are plucked away sometimes.

The nest sites are often long-established and naturally created by the freeze-thaw process of the tundra. Gravel bars may be used as well. The female may take the most active role in the nest's condition of any owl species. No owl build their own nests but female snowy owls take about three days constructing a scrape, digging with her claws and rotating until a fairly circular bowl is formed. She will still not construct or add foreign materials to the nest (despite some circumstantial evidence of moss and grass from outside the nest mound being found). In two separate cases in Utqiaġvik, two separate females dug out a second scrape to the side and below the main nests and appeared to have called all chicks to the more secluded nest to ride out severe weather until the skies cleared. The Utqiaġvik nest scrapes averaged 47.7 cm × 44 cm (18.8 in × 17.3 in) in 91 with a mean depth of 9.8 cm (3.9 in) while the scrapes were smaller in Hooper Bay, reportedly 25 to 33 cm (9.8 to 13.0 in) diameter and 4 to 9 cm (1.6 to 3.5 in) in depth. Occasionally, in the lower tundra, snowy owls may too use old nests of rough-legged buzzards as well as abandoned eagle nests.

Unlike other northerly breeding raptorial birds, the snowy owl is not known to nest on cliffs and the like, so do not enter into direct competition with eagles, falcons, ravens or other Bubo owls when nesting to the relative south. The area of nest mound often has a relatively rich plant life which attract the lemmings, which may tunnel right under and around the owl's nest. Geese, ducks and shorebirds of several species known to gain incidental protection by nesting close to snowy owls. Conversely, the snowy owls will sometimes kill and eat both young and adults of these birds, which implies a trade-off in the benefits.

=== Eggs ===
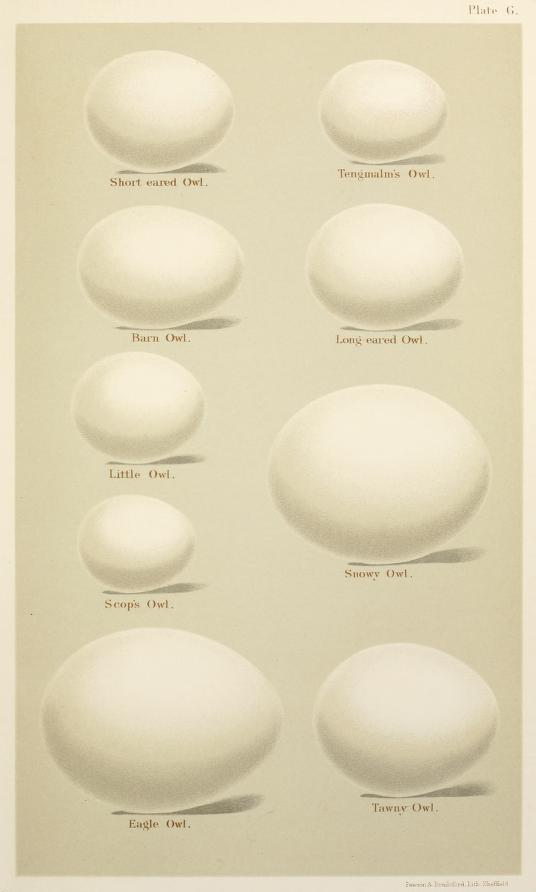
An illustration of 8 European owl species' eggs, with the snowy owl in the middle of the right row. Note the much larger egg of the Eurasian eagle-owl at bottom.

Egg-laying normally begins during early May to the first 10 days of June. Late thaws are harmful to them since they allow too little time for the full breeding process, with particularly importance given to good food supply in May for adults, even more so apparently than food supply in July when young are being fed. Late nests are possible cases of inexperienced pairs, low food supplies, bigamy or even replacement clutches. The clutch is extremely variable in size averaging around 7–9, with up to 15 or 16 eggs recorded in extreme cases. The clutch size very large relative to related species. Mean clutch sizes were 7.5 in a sample of 24 in Hooper Bay (range of 5–11); 6.7 in a sample of seven from Utqiaġvik (4–9); 9 in a sample of a sample of 5 in Baffin Island; 9.8 on Victoria Island; 8.4 (in a sample of 14) on Elsemere Island; 7.4 on Wrangel Island and 7.74 in Finnish Lapland. The average clutch size was 9.8 in a good year in Victoria Island while in a good year in Utqiaġvik the mean was 6.5. The clutch is laid directly to the ground and are pure, glossy white. An average egg is around 56.4 mm × 44.7 mm (2.22 in × 1.76 in) with a range of heights from 50 to 70.2 mm (1.97 to 2.76 in) and diameter of 41 to 49.3 mm (1.61 to 1.94 in).

Egg weights are around 47.5 to 68 g (1.68 to 2.40 oz), the median or average being 53 and 60.3 g (1.87 and 2.13 oz) in different datasets. The average egg size is relatively small, about 20% smaller than Eurasian eagle-owl eggs and 8% smaller than great horned owl eggs. Laying intervals are normally 2 days (41–50 hours mostly). The laying intervals can range up to 3–5 days in inclement weather. The laying of a clutch of 11 eggs can take 20–30 days, while a more typical nest of around 8 takes about up to 16 days. The interval between the 8th and 9th eggs can be up to about 4 days. Incubation begins with the first egg and is by female alone, while she is fed by her mate.

=== Parental behavior ===
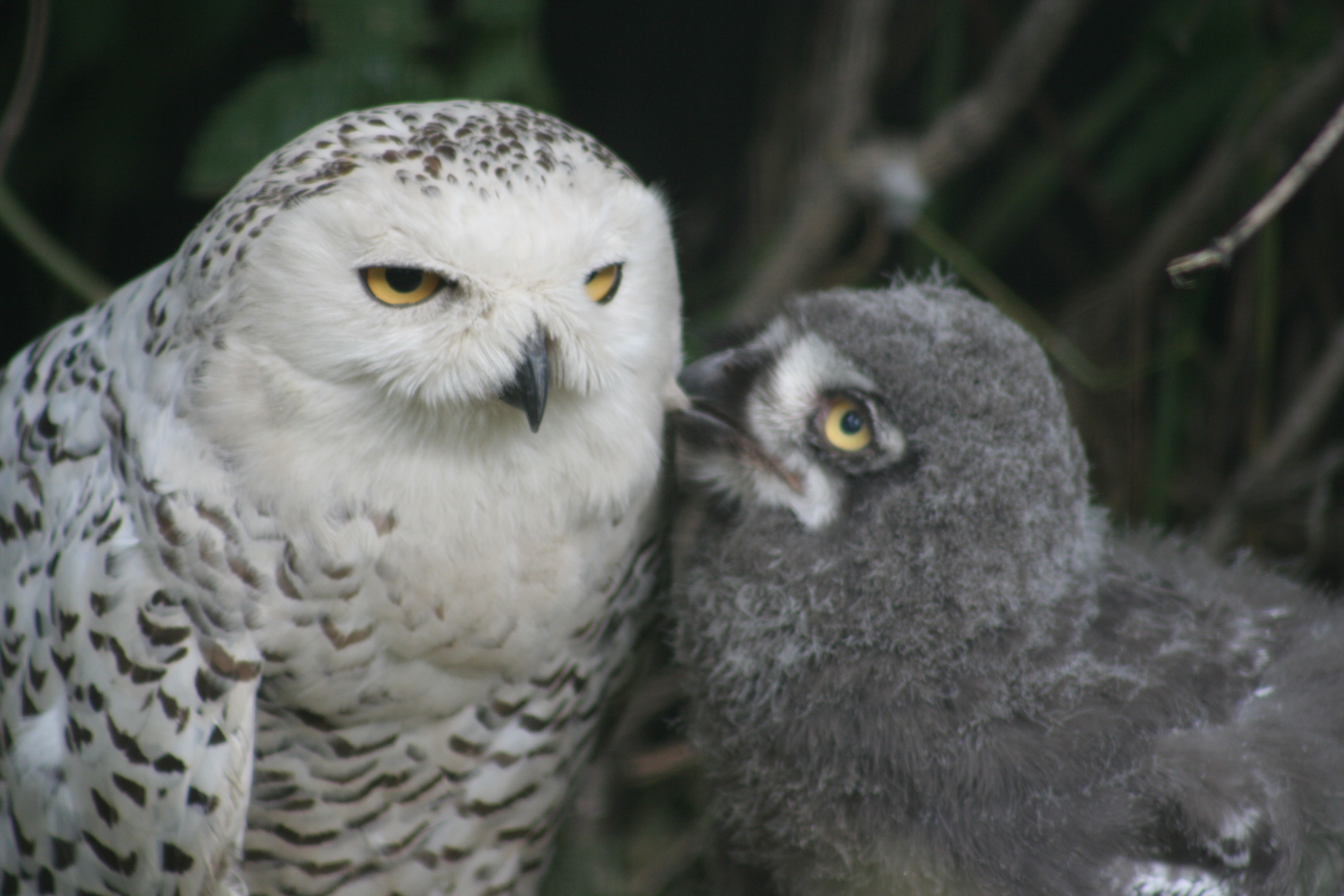
A captive mother snowy owl with her chick.

Food is brought to the nest by males and surplus food is stored nearby. Females in breeding season often develop a very extensive brood patch which in this species is a fairly enormous, high vascularized featherless area of pink belly skin. Incubation lasts 31.8–33 days (unconfirmed and possibly dubious reports from as little as 27 to as much as 38-day incubations). The female alone broods the young, often while simultaneously incubating still unhatched eggs. Sometimes older chicks incidentally brood their younger siblings and females may shelter the young under her wings during inclement weather.

When first feeding the young, the female may dismantle prey to feed the young only the softer body parts then gradually ramping up the size of proportions until they eat a whole prey item. Aggressive encounters with parent snowy owls are said to be "genuinely dangerous" and one resource claimed the snowy owl to be the bird species with the most formidable nest defense displays towards humans. The usual response to sighted humans near the nest is mild, but continued approach begins to increasingly irritate the parents. At times, humans are forcefully dive-bombed upon, while other potential threats are dealt with in a "forward-threat" where the male walks towards the intruders, engaging in impressive feather-raising and fanning out of half-spread wings until they run forward and slash with both their feet and bill. Fairly serious injuries have been sustained in the worst of snowy owl defensive attacks, including cranial trauma, requiring researchers to make the long trek back to medical care, although human fatalities are not known.

Snowy owl parents have been seen to aggressively attacked glaucous gulls, arctic fox and dogs in breeding ground in Utqiaġvik. Non-predatory animals like caribou in Utqiaġvik and sheep (Ovis aries) in Fetlar are attacked as well, possibly to avoid potential trampling of the eggs or the young. Males are said to do the majority of nest defense but the female will also often become involved as well. Analysis showed in Lapland, Sweden, that females in nest defense against people engaged in vocal displays (warning and mewing calls) and that males did not engage in mewing but did engage in most hooting calls, many warning calls and almost all physical attacks.

In other instances, distraction displays are engaged in against predators, with a "broken-wing act" including high, thin squeals interspersed with weird squeaks, often taking flight only to quickly fall from the sky and imitate a struggle. One author recorded a male to draw him about 2 km (1.2 mi) from the nest before ceasing. 77% of 45 distraction displays in Lapland, Sweden were by females.

=== Development of young ===
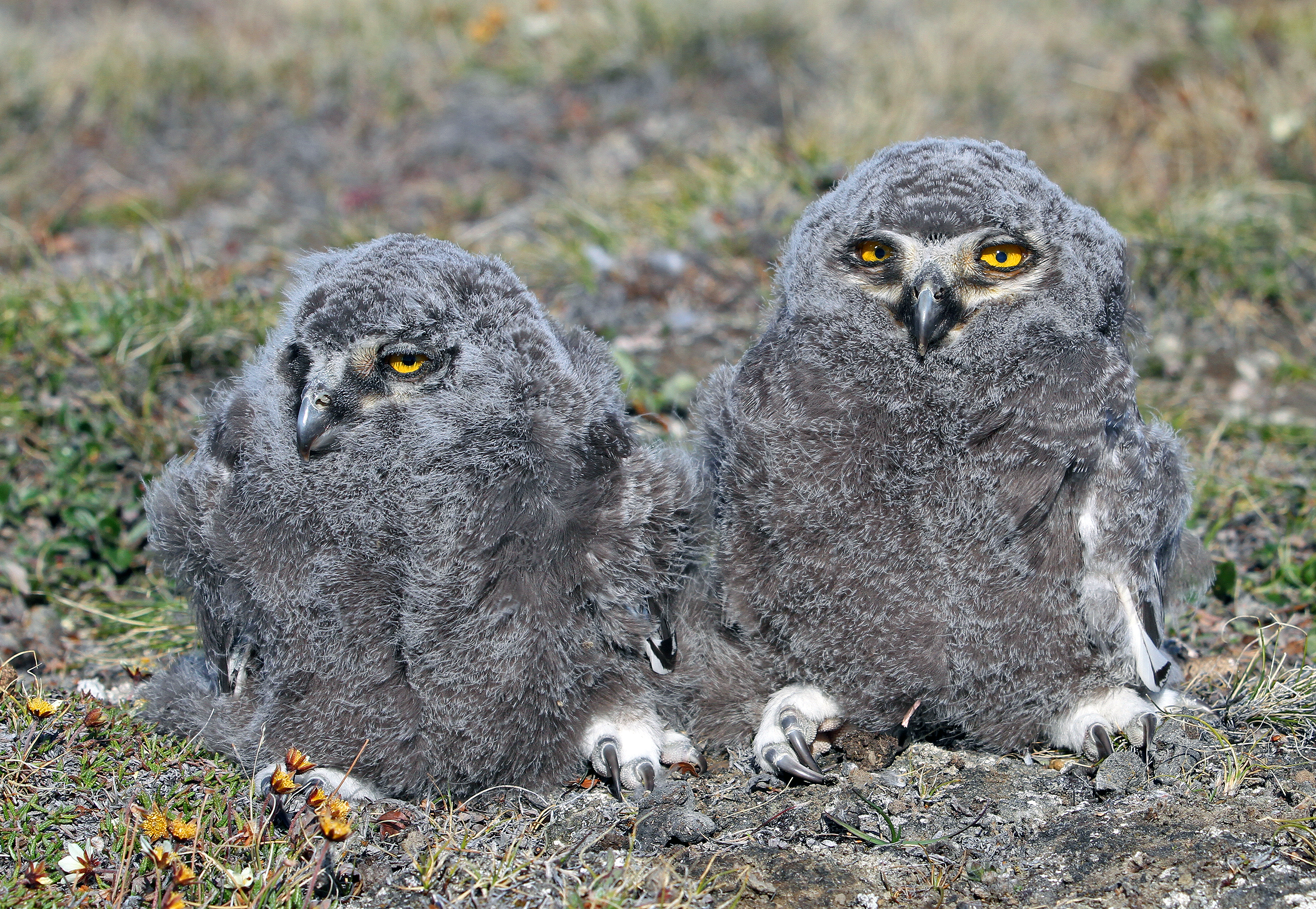
Snowy owl nestlings on Traill Island.

Hatching intervals are generally from 1 to 3 days, quite often within 37–45 hours apart. New chicks are semi-altricial (i.e. typically helpless and blind), initially being white and rather wet but dry by the end of the first day. The weight of 7 hatchlings was 35 to 55 g (1.2 to 1.9 oz), with an average of 46 g (1.6 oz) while 3 were 44.7 g (1.58 oz). Due to the pronounced asynchrony of the egg-laying and hatching, the size difference between siblings can be enormous and in some cases when the smallest chick weighs only 20 to 50 g (0.71 to 1.76 oz), the biggest chick already has attained a weight of around 350 to 380 g (12 to 13 oz).

When the oldest chick is about three weeks old, the female will start to hunt as well as the male and both may directly feed the young although in some cases they may not need hunt very much if lemmings are particularly numerous. Caches of lemmings around a nest may include more than 80 lemmings that can support the family. Unlike many owls, the chicks of snowy owls are not known to behave aggressively toward one another or to engage in siblicide, perhaps in part due to the need for energy conservance. Some cases of cannibalism of chicks by the family group were thought to be cases where chicks die from other causes. When they are about 2 weeks, the chicks may begin to walk around the nest site which they leave by 18–28 days, although they are still unable to fly and may find safety in nooks and crannies of vegetation and rocks usually only about 1 to 2 m (3.3 to 6.6 ft) from the nest mound, as well as via their parents' defense. Leaving the nest is thought to likely be an anti-predator strategy.

The male snowy owl may drop fresh prey deliveries directly on the ground near the wandering young. After about three weeks of age, the young may wander fairly widely, rarely to 1 km (0.62 mi), but usually stay within 500 m (1,600 ft) of the nest mound. Threat postures by young in reaction to researchers were first noticeable at about 20–25 days of age and common at about 28 days and the chicks can be impressively quick and agile-footed. The first fledgling occurs at around 35–50 days, and by 50–60 days the young can fly well and hunt on their own. The total care period is for 2–3.5 months, increasing in length with increased size of the brood. Although independence was once thought to be sought by late August or early September, it is more likely by late September to October when migration season for the species begins. The nesting cycle is similar in length to the Arctic short-eared owls and faster than Eurasian eagle-owls by up to 2 months.

=== Maturity and nesting success ===
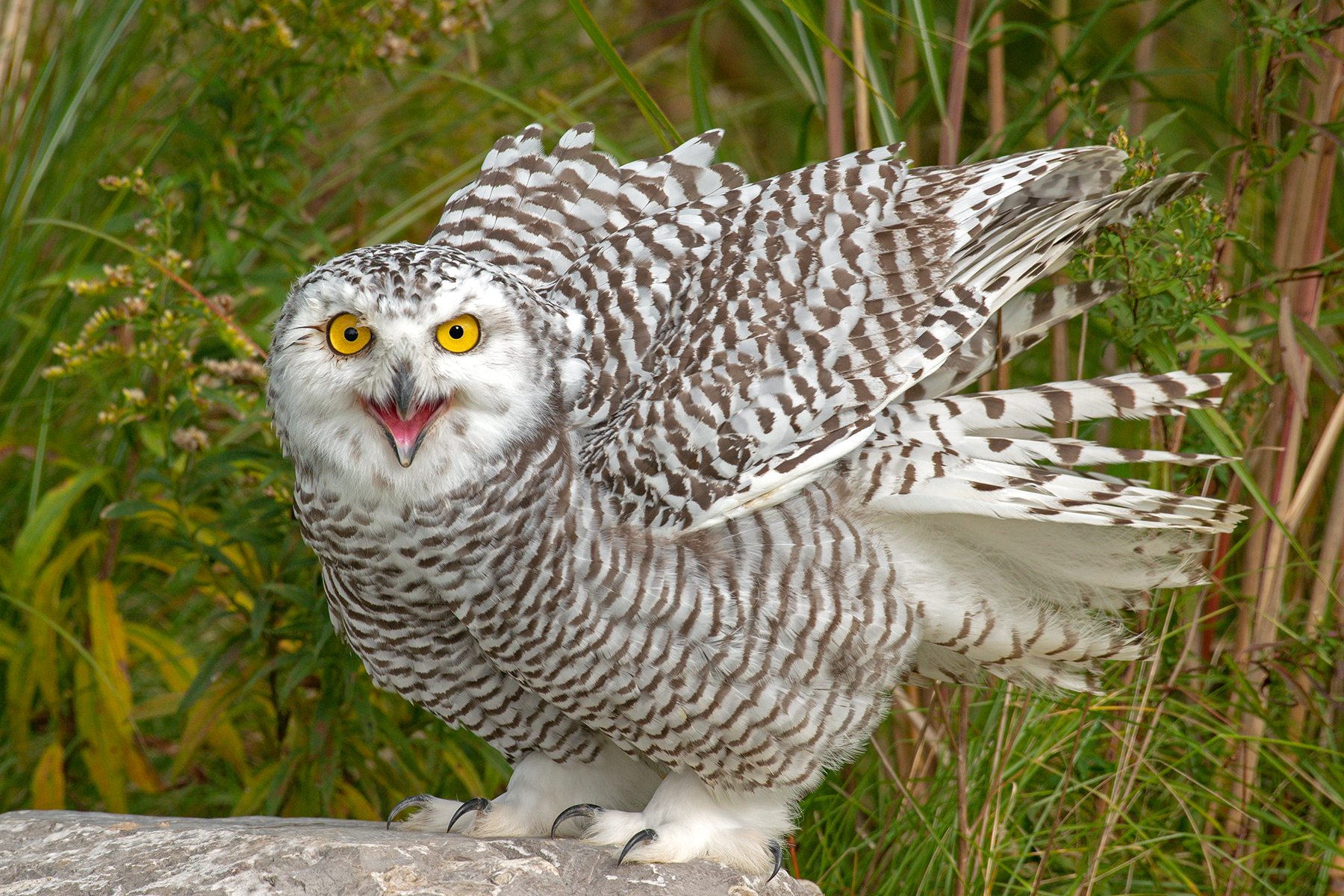
Snowy owl, juvenile, in Ontario, Canada.

Sexual maturity reached the following year but the first breeding is normally at no sooner than the end of the second year of life. There is little strong evidence of typical age of first breeding, but initial breeding by males could be inferred by their plumage. In Utqiaġvik, at that stage, males were nearly pure white and most were aged to about three to four years old. The snowy owl seems to markedly inconsistent in regard to breeding every year, often taking at least up to two years between attempts and sometimes as much as nearly a decade. Seven satellite-marking females in Canada proved that they did breed in consecutive years, with one breeding over three consecutive years. In 23 years at Utqiaġvik, snowys bred in 13 of them.

Nesting success can reach 90–100% in even the largest clutches in high lemming years. While over the course of 21 years, 260 total nests were recorded in Utqiaġvik. There, from 4–54 nests were recorded annually. The Utqiaġvik nests bore three to ten sized-clutches with a mean of six eggs per nest and an annual mean hatching success from 39 to 91%. 31–87% of chicks were able to depart on foot and 48–65% were annually estimated to survive to fledge; elsewhere, 40% survived to fledge. In another set, 97% of observed eggs both hatched and fledged. In Norway, the fledging success from 10 nests was much lower at about 46%. Norwegian data, which previously indicated it to be an almost accidental breeder in northern Norway, indicates that it is a more regular breeder than expected, though. Three good years were found for snowy owls between 1968 and 2005: 1974 (when there were 12 pairs), 1978 (22 pairs) and 1985 (20 pairs), with 14 additional locations when potential (but not confirmed) breeding has occurred. The main determinable causes of nest failure were deemed to be starvation and exposure. A number of Norwegian and Finnish nests were known to fail due to severe black fly parasitism.

== Longevity ==
Snowy owls live long lives relative to other bird species. Records show that the oldest snowy owls in captivity can live to 25 or even 30 years of age. Typical lifespans reach around 10 years in the wild. The longest known lifespan in the wild was of a snowy owl initially banded (possibly in its first winter) in Massachusetts and recovered dead in Montana 23 years and 10 months later. The annual survival rate for twelve females on Bylot Island was estimated at around 85–92.3%.

It is often reported that snowy owls frequently die from starvation, with historical accounts stating that they "had to" leave their breeding grounds due to lemming "crashes" but would starve to the south. However, it has been shown that snowy owls often do have enough food to survive through the winter. This is reinforced somewhat by small radio-tracking and banding studies of snowy owls in the northern Great Plains and the intermountain valleys of the northwestern United States. More circumstantial evidence shows a lack of starvation in the eastern part of North America as well.

There is evidence that some adults return to the same wintering areas over multiple years, areas which are far south of their breeding range. At Logan Airport, most snowy owls that are seen appear to be in good condition. Of 71 dead snowy owls found in winter in the northern Great Plains, 86% died from assorted traumas, including collisions with automobiles and other, usually manmade, objects as well as electrocutions and shootings. Only 14% of the 71 deaths were due to apparent starvation. Some owls appeared to have incurred injuries but healed and survived. More evidence was found in wintering snowy owls in New York of healed fractures, though some may require surgery to recover.

537 wintering birds in Saskatchewan were studied based on fat reserves, which were superior in females over males and adults over juveniles; while 31% of females lacked fat reserves, at least 45% of males found starving or in a state of infirmity were males and 63% turned into Wildlife rehabilitation centres were also males. In British Columbia, of 177 snowy owl deaths, of owls to die, only a small percentage were due to natural causes, such as assumed starvation at 13% and 12% were "found dead". One fledgling on Fetlar died due to pneumonia and Staphylococcus, while a second died from Aspergillosis.

Evidence shows that in Utqiaġvik during exceptionally prolonged rains (i.e. 2 to 3 days), nest-departed young were vulnerable to starvation, leading to hypothermia and pneumonia. Due to their natural history, the snowy owl may be affected more severely by blood parasitism than other raptors, due to lowered immunity. Conversely, they appear to have lower levels of ectoparasites such as chewing lice than other large owls per large samples from Manitoba. The snowy owls averaged about 3.9 chewing lice per host against 7.5 for great grey owls and 10.5 for great horned owls.

== Status ==
The presence and numbers of this species depend on the amount of food available. In high lemming years, snowy owls can appear to be quite abundant in habitat. Numbers of snowy owls are difficult to estimate even within studies that take place over decades due to the nomadic nature of adults. The population of Scandinavia has long been perceived as very small and ephemeral with Finland holding 0–100 pairs; Norway holding 1–20 pairs and Sweden holding 1–50 pairs.

However, in Sweden as of November 2025, the Swedish Species Information Centre proposed classifying the snowy owl as "extinct" in Sweden in preliminary assessments for its 2025 Red List, after no nesting has been observed since 2015. Birdlife reached the same consensus as no nesting has been observed. A low breeding population within European Russia has been estimated to hold 1,300–4,500 pairs and Greenland to have 500–1,000 pairs. In Europe, the owl is actually classed as ‘Least Concern’ - but this assessment hasn’t been updated since 18 December 2020.

Aside from northern North America, a large part of the snowy owl's breeding range lies in northern Russia, but overall estimates are not known. An exact count of 4,871 individuals was seen on surveys between the Indigirka and Kolyma rivers. The numbers estimated by Partners in Flight and other authors by the 2000s was that North America held about 72,500 snowy owls, about 30% of which were juveniles.

The Canadian population of snowy owls was estimated at 10,000–30,000 (in the 1990s) or even to 50,000–100,000 individuals, perhaps improbably. Within Canada, the population on Banks Island was once claimed at up to 15,000–25,000 in productive years and in Queen Elizabeth Islands at about 932 individuals. Alaska is the only American state with breeding snowy owls but has probably quite a bit fewer breeding owls than does Canada. Furthermore, the Partners in Flight and the IUCN estimated that the world population was roughly 200,000–290,000 individuals as recently as the 2000s. However, in the 2010s, it has been discovered that all prior estimates were extremely excessive and that more precise numbers could be estimated with better surveying, phylogeographic data and more insights into the owl's freewheeling wanderings. It is believed that there are only 14,000–28,000 mature breeding pairs of snowy owls in the world. During lemming declines, the number of nesting females may drop down to as low as 1,700 worldwide, a dangerously low number, and the number of snowy owls worldwide is less than 10% of what it was once thought to be.

Due to the small and rapidly declining population, the snowy was uplisted in 2017 to being a vulnerable species by the IUCN. A 52% decline has been inferred for the North American population since the 1960s with another even more drastic estimate placing the decline from 1970 to 2014 at 64%. Trends are harder to delineate in Scandinavia but a similar downward trend is thought to be occurring. Snowy owls are listed in Appendix II of the Convention on International Trade in Endangered Species (CITES) meaning international trade (including in parts and derivatives) is regulated.

=== Anthropogenic mortality and persecution ===
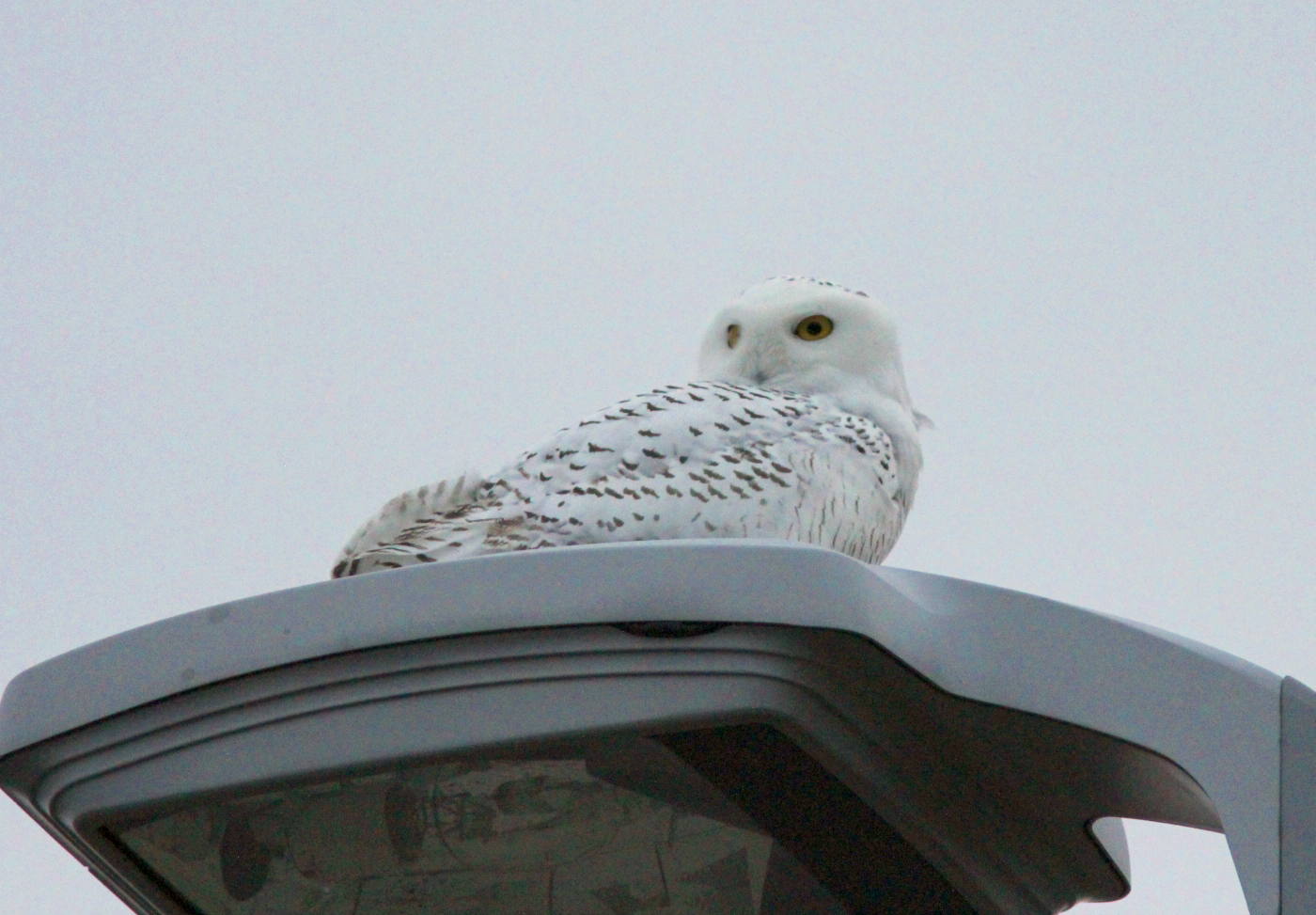
Snowy owls often favor airports, such as this one at Gerald R. Ford International Airport, in winter but the risk of birdstrike is high in such areas.

Of 438 band encounters in the USG banding laboratory, almost all causes of death that could be determined, whether intentional or not, were correlated with human interference. 34.2% or 150 were dead due to unknown causes, 11.9% were shot, 7.1% were hit by automobiles, 5.5% were found dead or injured on highways, 3.9% were collision from towers or wires, 2.7% were in animal traps, 2.1% in airplane birdstrikes, 0.6% were entangled while the remaining 33.3% recovered injured due to assorted or unknown causes. Snowy owls are endangered by heavy airport usage resulting in birdstrikes. Many such collisions are known in Canada and likely also in Siberia and Mongolia .

Despite their danger to planes, no human fatalities have been recorded in collisions with this species. Snowy owls are always far outnumbered in Canadian airports in winter by short-eared owls. However, relative to its scarcity, the snowy accounts for a very large balance of the birdstrikes recorded at American airports due to the attractiveness of the habitat, accounting for 4.6% of 2456 recorded collisions (the barn owl is the most frequently involved in birdstrikes).

The species is locally vulnerable to pesticides. The placement of buildings in the Utqiaġvik is thought to have displaced some snowy owls. In Norway, potential sources of disturbance near the nests include tourism, recreation, reindeer husbandry, motorized traffic, dogs, photographers, ornithologists and scientists. Some biologist have expressed concern that radio-tagging of snowy owls may cause some unclear detrimental effect on snowy owls but little evidence is known if they actually make the owls more susceptible to death.

Snowy owls can be quite wary, as they are not infrequently hunted by Circumpolar peoples. Historically, the snowy owl was one of the most persecuted owl species. In the irruption of 1876–77, an estimated 500 snowy owls were shot, with similar numbers in 1889–90 and an estimated 500–1,000 killed in Ontario alone during 1901–02 invasion and about 800 killed in the 1905–06 invasion. Indigenous people of the Arctic historically killed snowy owls as food but many communities in northern Alaska are fairly modernized, therefore biologists feel that the permitted killing of snowy owls by the indigenous is outdated.

The consumption of snowy owls by humans has been proven as far back as ancient cave deposits in France and elsewhere, and they have even been considered as one of the most frequent food species for early humans. They do not shun developed areas especially with old field that hold rodents and, due to lack of human experience, can be extremely tame and unable to escape armed humans.

In British Columbia, of 177 snowy owl deaths, the most often diagnosed cause of death was shootings at 25%, often well after legal protection of the species. The number poached snowy owls in Ontario is opined to be unusually high considering their scarcity. While the species was once otherwise killed as food and then later shot out of resentment for perceived threats against domestic and favored game stock, the reasoning behind ongoing shooting of snowy owls into the 21st century is not well-understood.

Siberian snowy owls are frequently victim to baited fox traps, with possibly up to around 300 killed in a year based upon very rough estimates. Warfarin poisoning in use as rodenticides are known to kill some wintering snowy owls, including up to six at Logan Airport alone.

Mercury concentrations, most likely through bioaccumulation, have been detected in snowy owls in the Aleutian Islands but it is not known whether fatal mercury poisoning has occurred. PCBs may have killed some snowy owls in concentration. Some airports have advocated and instituted the practice of shooting owls to avoid birdstrikes but successful translocation is possible and preferred given the species protected status.

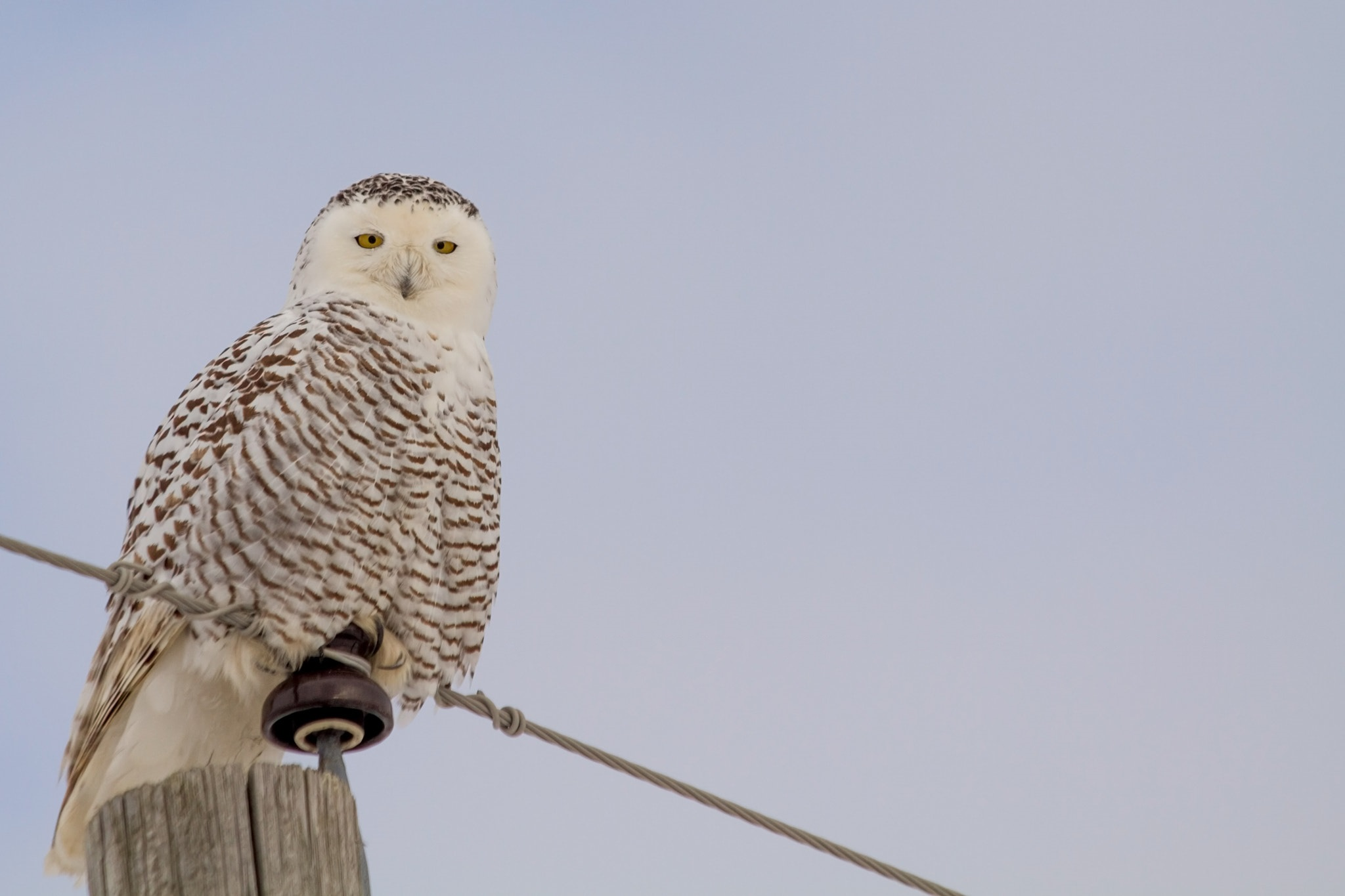
A potential high risk of electrocution exists for snowy owls in winter.

Climate change is widely perceived to perhaps the primary driver of the snowy owl's decline. As temperatures continue to rise, abiotic factors such as increased rain and reduced snow are likely to effect lemming populations and, in turn, snowy owls. These and potentially many other issues (possibly including modifying migrating behavior, vegetation composition, increased insect, disease and parasite activities, risk of hyperthermia) are a matter of concern.

Additionally, reduction of sea ice, which snowy owls are known to rely extensively on, as a result of warming climates, impacts could be significant. The effect of climate change was essentially confirmed in northern Greenland where a perhaps irrevocable collapse of the lemming population was observed. From 1998 to 2000, the lemming numbers appeared to have quickly declined. The number of lemmings per hectare (ha) is less than one-fifth of what it once was in Greenland (i.e. from 12 lemmings per ha to less than 2 per ha at peak). This is almost certainly correlated with a 98% decline in owl productivity as well as that of the local stoats (the long-tailed jaeger and Arctic foxes, though previously thought to be almost as reliant on lemmings, seem to be more loosely coupled and more generalized and did not decline as much). The amount of lemming mounds is much less than it once was in northern Greenland and any variety of population cycle has been apparently abandoned by what remains of the lemmings.

== In popular culture ==
- The Harry Potter books by J. K. Rowling, and subsequent films of the same name, feature a female snowy owl named Hedwig, the pet of the series' title character. Concern was expressed by some in the media that the popularity of the Harry Potter films would cause an increase in the illicit owl trade of snowy owls. However, there was no strong evidence of an increase in snowy owls confiscated from the black market, despite a larger than typical number of snowy owls being reported at wildlife centres.
- The snowy owl (harfang des neiges in French) is the avian symbol of Quebec.
