= Chionophile =

Group of Organisms able to thrive in cold winter conditions

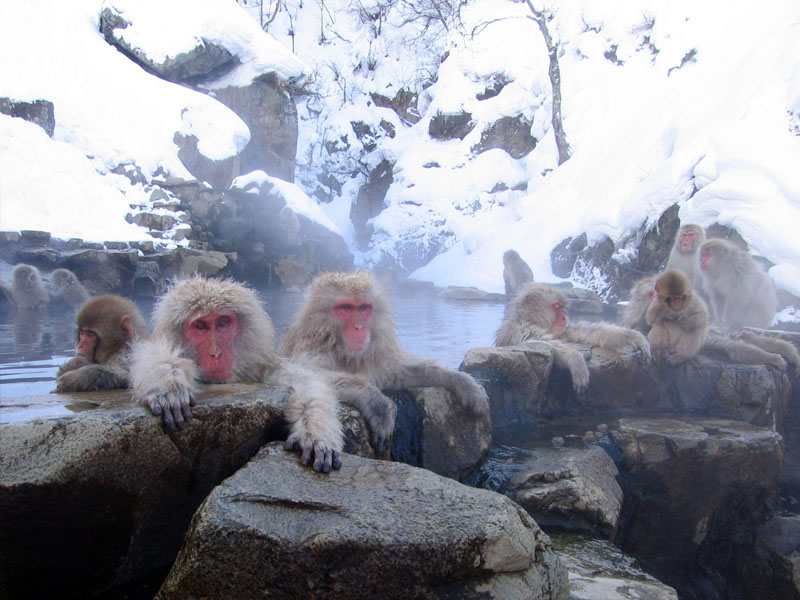
Japanese macaques can survive in cold temperatures of below −15°C (5°F), and are among very few primates that can do so.

Chionophiles are a group of organisms (animals, plants, fungi, etc.) that can thrive in cold winter conditions (the word is derived from the Greek word chion meaning "snow", and -phile meaning "lover"). These animals have specialized adaptations that help them survive the harshest winters.

== Polar regions ==
=== Arctic animals ===
Animals such as caribou, Arctic hares, Arctic ground squirrels, snowy owls, puffins, tundra swan, snow geese, Steller's eiders and willow ptarmigan all survive the harsh Arctic winters quite easily and some, like the willow ptarmigan, are only found in the Arctic region.

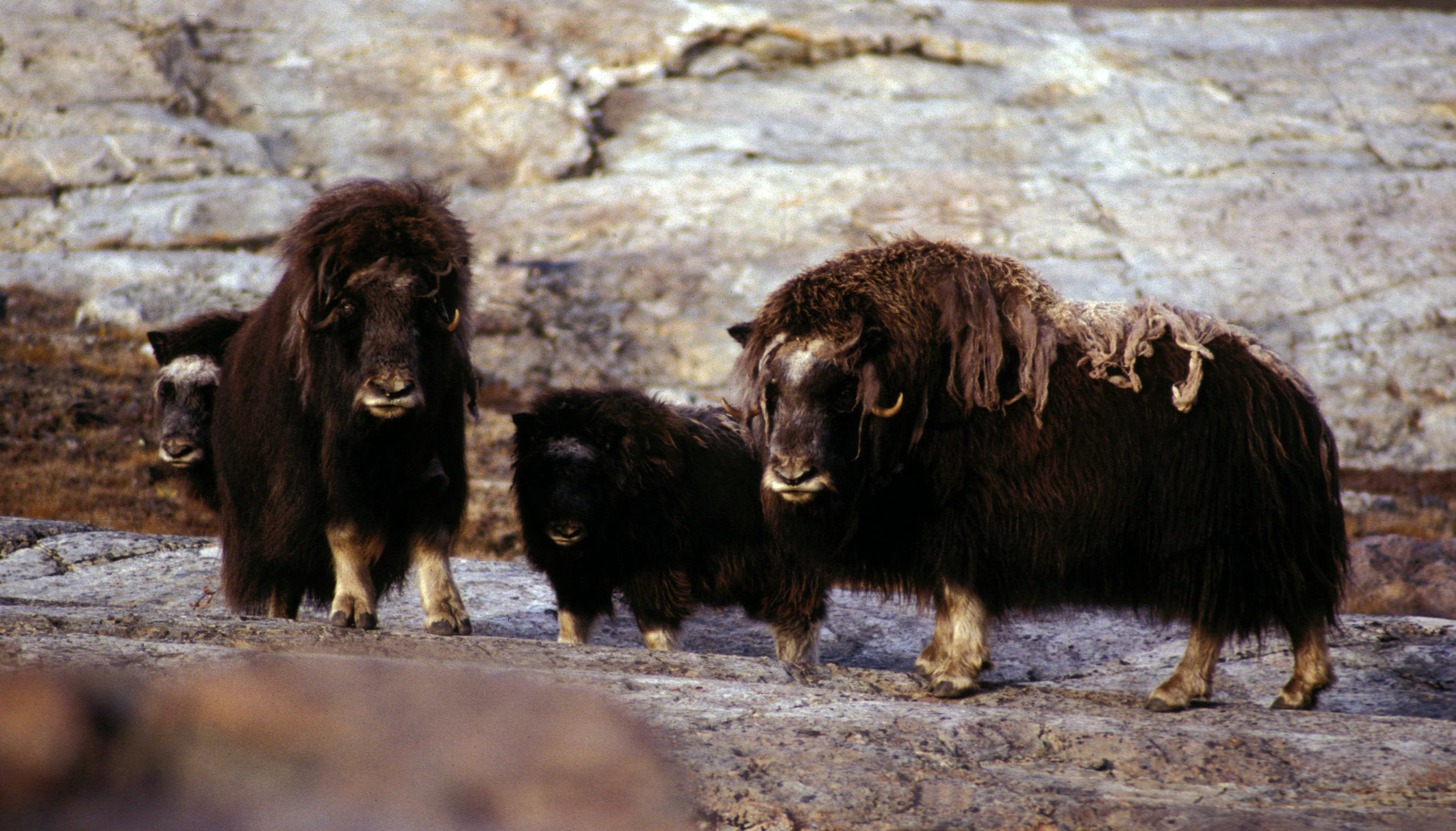
The musk ox thrived during the ice age 10,000 years ago, but after the earth had warmed up and the ice had receded it was forced either to migrate northward to cold environments for it to live in, or go extinct as the woolly mammoth did.

=== Antarctic animals ===
Antarctica, also known as the southern pole, is larger and can become much colder than the northern pole. As a result, few animals can survive on the mainland of Antarctica, and those that do mostly live near the coast. The few animals that live on the mainland are birds such as Antarctic terns, grey-headed albatross, imperial shag, snowy sheathbill and the most well known inhabitant of Antarctica, penguins. The inhospitable environment helps to deter predators; the few predators that hunt on the mainland, including the south polar skua and the southern giant petrel, mainly prey upon chicks. Most Antarctic predators are found in the polar waters, including the orca and the leopard seal.

=== Polar adaptations ===
Normally when colder conditions arrive, animals go into a state of suspended animation called hibernation, when they go into a state of inactivity for long periods of time, which they do not come out of until more suitable conditions for them to survive in arrive. However, when animals live in an environment that is inhospitable for much of the year, then hibernation is not necessary. One of the few animals that does so are lemmings, which have a mass migration after they come out of dormancy. However, most animals living in the arctic would still be active, even during the most brutal times of winter. Aquatic animals such as Greenland shark, wolf fish, Atlantic cod, Atlantic halibut and Arctic char must cope with the sub-zero temperatures in their waters. Some aquatic mammals, such as walrus, seal, sea lion, narwhals, beluga whales and killer whales, can store fat called blubber that they use to help keep warm in the icy waters. Some ungulates that live in frigid conditions often have pads under their hooves to help have a stronger tension on the icy ground or to help in climbing up on rocky terrain. But mammals that already have a pad under their foot such as polar bears, wolverines, Arctic wolves and Arctic foxes will have fur under their pads to help keep their flesh concealed from the cold. Other mammals such as the musk oxen can keep warm by growing long, shaggy fur to help insulate heat. And this can be quickly shed off when warmer temperatures arrive. But with the snowshoe hare it will change the color of its fur from white to brown or with patches of brown when it sheds off its winter coat. This is to help camouflage itself in its new environment to match with the dirt during the summer or back again when it regrows its longer white fur to match with the snow during the winter.

=== Mountainous regions ===
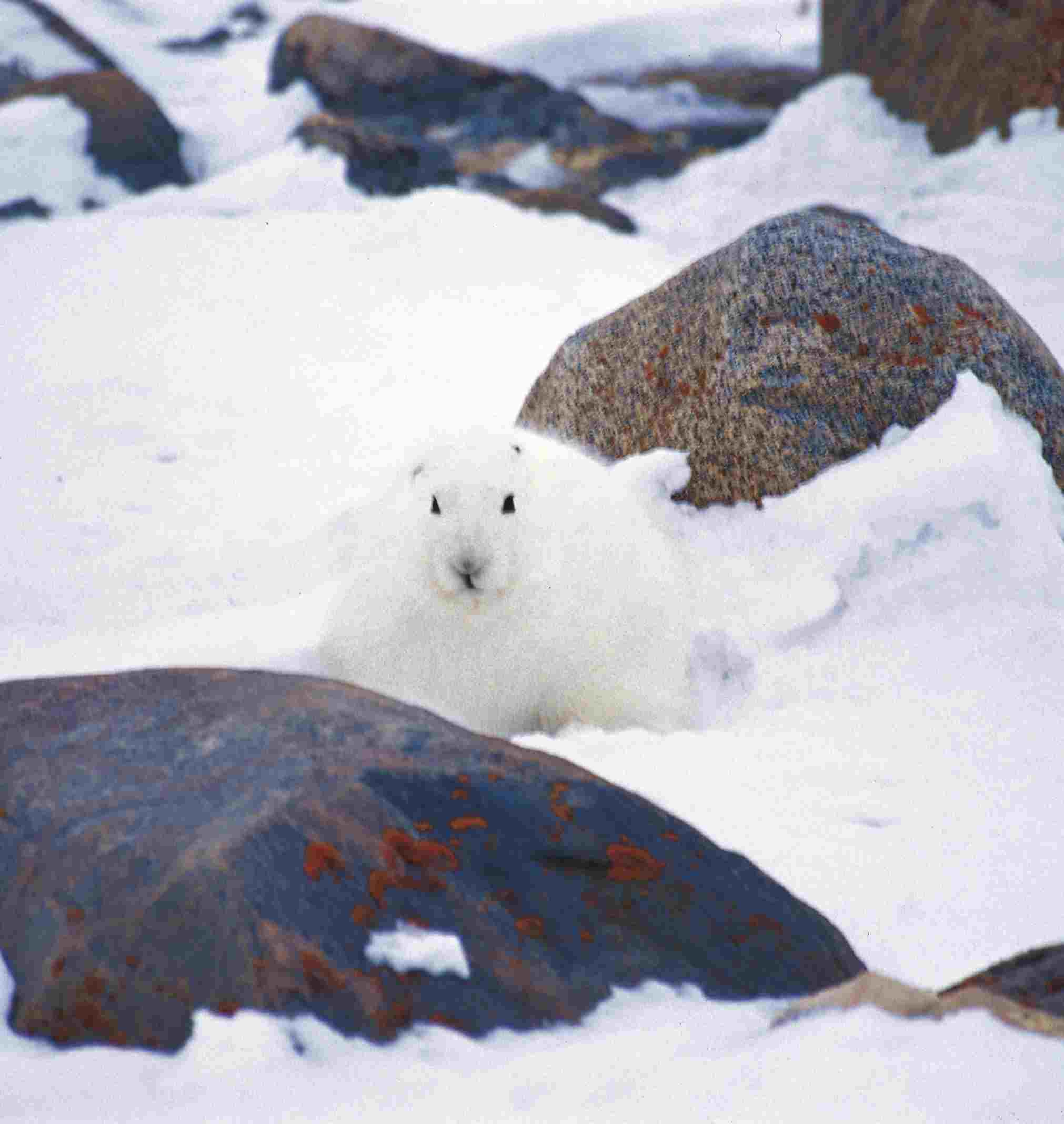
The snowshoe hare in its winter coat is well camouflaged among the snow.

Other chionophiles can be found on or near the equator and yet still live in freezing temperatures. This is mostly due to their geographical range, such as on high altitude mountains where it can reach very cold temperatures and have less oxygen the higher the altitude. These may include the Andes, the Himalayas and the Hindu Kush mountains, where animals such as snow leopards, pumas, wild yaks, mountain sheep, mountain goats, ibex, vicuñas and guanacos can thrive.

== Known chionophiles ==
The following animals are known chionophiles:

- ABC Islands bear
- Adélie penguin
- Alaska marmot
- Alaska moose
- Alaska Peninsula brown bear
- Alaskan hare
- Alaskan tundra wolf
- Antarctic fur seal
- Antarctic petrel
- Antarctic tern
- Arctic fox
- Arctic hare
- Arctic redpoll
- Arctic tern
- Arctic warbler
- Arctic wolf
- Atlantic puffin
- Baird's sandpiper
- Baffin Island wolf
- Barnacle goose
- Barren ground shrew
- Barren-ground caribou
- Bearded seal
- Black guillemot
- Black-bellied storm petrel
- Black-legged kittiwake
- Brown skua
- Buff-breasted sandpiper
- Cape petrel
- Chinstrap penguin
- Common murre
- Crabeater seal
- Crested auklet
- Emperor penguin
- Gentoo penguin
- Glaucous gull
- Great skua
- Greater white-fronted goose
- Grey plover
- Grey seal
- Gyrfalcon
- Harbor seal
- Harp seal
- Heuglin's gull
- Hooded seal
- Iceland gull
- Ivory gull
- Kelp gull
- King eider
- Lapland longspur
- Least auklet
- Lemming
- Leopard seal
- Lesser white-fronted goose
- Little auk
- Little stint
- Long-tailed jaeger
- Macaroni penguin
- Muskox
- Nelson's collared lemming
- Northern collared lemming
- Northern elephant seal
- Northern fur seal
- North American brown lemming
- Pacific golden plover
- Parasitic jaeger
- Peary caribou
- Pectoral sandpiper
- Polar bear
- Pomarine jaeger
- Purple sandpiper
- Red knot
- Red phalarope
- Red-legged kittiwake
- Reindeer
- Ribbon seal
- Ringed seal
- Ross seal
- Ross's gull
- Ruddy turnstone
- Sabine's gull
- Sanderling
- Siberian brown lemming
- Snow bunting
- Snow goose
- Snow petrel
- Snowshoe hare
- Snowy owl
- Snowy sheathbill
- South polar skua
- Southern elephant seal
- Southern fulmar
- Spectacled eider
- Spotted seal
- Steller's eider
- Svalbard reindeer
- Thick-billed murre
- Tundra vole
- Ungava collared lemming
- Walrus
- Weddell seal
- White-rumped sandpiper
- Wolverine
- Yellow-billed loon

== See also ==
- Aquatic animals
- Arboreal locomotion
- List of birds of Antarctica
- Psychrophile
- Troglobite
- Xerocole
