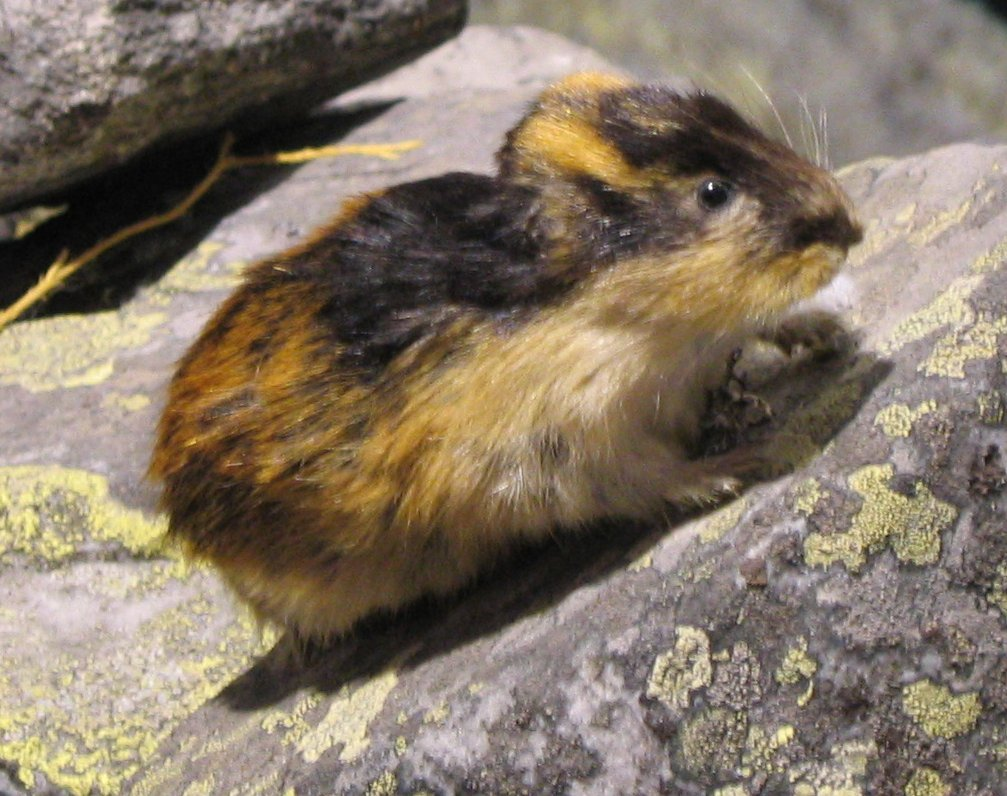
- Norway lemming (Lemmus lemmus)

Scientific classification
- Kingdom: Animalia
- Phylum: Chordata
- Class: Mammalia
- Infraclass: Placentalia
- Order: Rodentia
- Family: Cricetidae
- Subfamily: Arvicolinae

Groups included
- Dicrostonychini – collared lemmings; Lagurini 18-24 – steppe lemmings; Lemmini – true lemmings

Cladistically included but traditionally excluded taxa
- Arvicolini; Ellobiusini – mole voles; Myodini; Ondatrini – muskrats; Phenacomyini – tree and heather voles; Pliomyini; Prometheomyini

= Lemming =

Tribe of rodents of the family Cricetidae

A lemming is a small rodent, usually found in or near the Arctic in tundra biomes. Lemmings form the subfamily Arvicolinae (also known as Microtinae) together with voles and muskrats, which form part of the superfamily Muroidea, which also includes rats, mice, hamsters and gerbils. They play an important role in the Arctic ecosystem, acting as grazers of mosses and grasses and as the primary prey (food) source for most Arctic carnivores. A longstanding myth claims that they exhibit herd mentality and jump off cliffs, committing mass suicide.

== Description and habitat ==
Lemmings measure around 13–18 cm (5–7 in) in length and weigh around 23–34 g (0.8–1.2 oz). Lemmings are quite rounded in shape, with brown and black, long, soft fur. They have a very short tail, a stubby, hairy snout, short legs and small ears. They have a flattened claw on the first digit of their front feet, which helps them to dig in the snow. They are herbivorous, feeding mostly on mosses and grasses. They also forage through the snow surface to find berries, leaves, shoots, roots, bulbs, and lichens. Lemmings choose their preferred dietary vegetation disproportionately to its occurrence in their habitat. They digest grasses and sedges less effectively than related voles. Like other rodents, they have incisors that grow continuously, allowing them to feed on much tougher forage. Lemmings do not hibernate through the harsh northern winter. They remain active, finding food by burrowing through the snow. These rodents live in large tunnel systems beneath the snow in winter, which protect them from predators. Their burrows have rest areas, toilet areas and nesting rooms. They make nests out of grasses, feathers, and muskox wool (qiviut). In the spring, they move to higher ground, where they live on mountain heaths or in forests, continuously breeding before returning in autumn to the tundra.

Lemmings can live for up to twenty-four months although life expectancy is usually stated to be a year as a result of predation control.

== Behaviour ==
Like many other rodents, lemmings have periodic population booms and then disperse in all directions, seeking food and shelter their natural habitats cannot provide. The Norway lemming and West Siberian lemming are two of the few vertebrates which reproduce so quickly that their population fluctuations are chaotic, rather than following linear growth to a carrying capacity or regular oscillations. Why lemming populations fluctuate with such great variance roughly every four years, before numbers drop to near extinction, is not known. Lemming behaviour and appearance are markedly different from those of other rodents, which are inconspicuously coloured and try to conceal themselves from their predators. Lemmings, by contrast, are conspicuously coloured and behave aggressively toward predators and even human observers. The lemming defence system is thought to be based on aposematism (warning display). Fluctuations in the lemming population affect the behaviour of predators, and may fuel irruptions of birds of prey such as snowy owls to areas further south. For many years, the population of lemmings was believed to change with the population cycle, but now some evidence suggests their predators' populations, particularly those of the stoat, may be more closely involved in changing the lemming population.

== Misconceptions ==
Misconceptions about lemmings go back many centuries. In 1532, the geographer Jacob Ziegler of Bavaria proposed the theory that the creatures fell out of the sky during stormy weather and then died suddenly when the grass grew in spring. This description was contradicted by natural historian Ole Worm, who accepted that lemmings could fall out of the sky, but claimed that they had been brought over by the wind rather than created by spontaneous generation. Worm published dissections of a lemming, which showed that they are anatomically similar to most other rodents such as voles and hamsters, and the work of Carl Linnaeus proved that they had a natural origin.

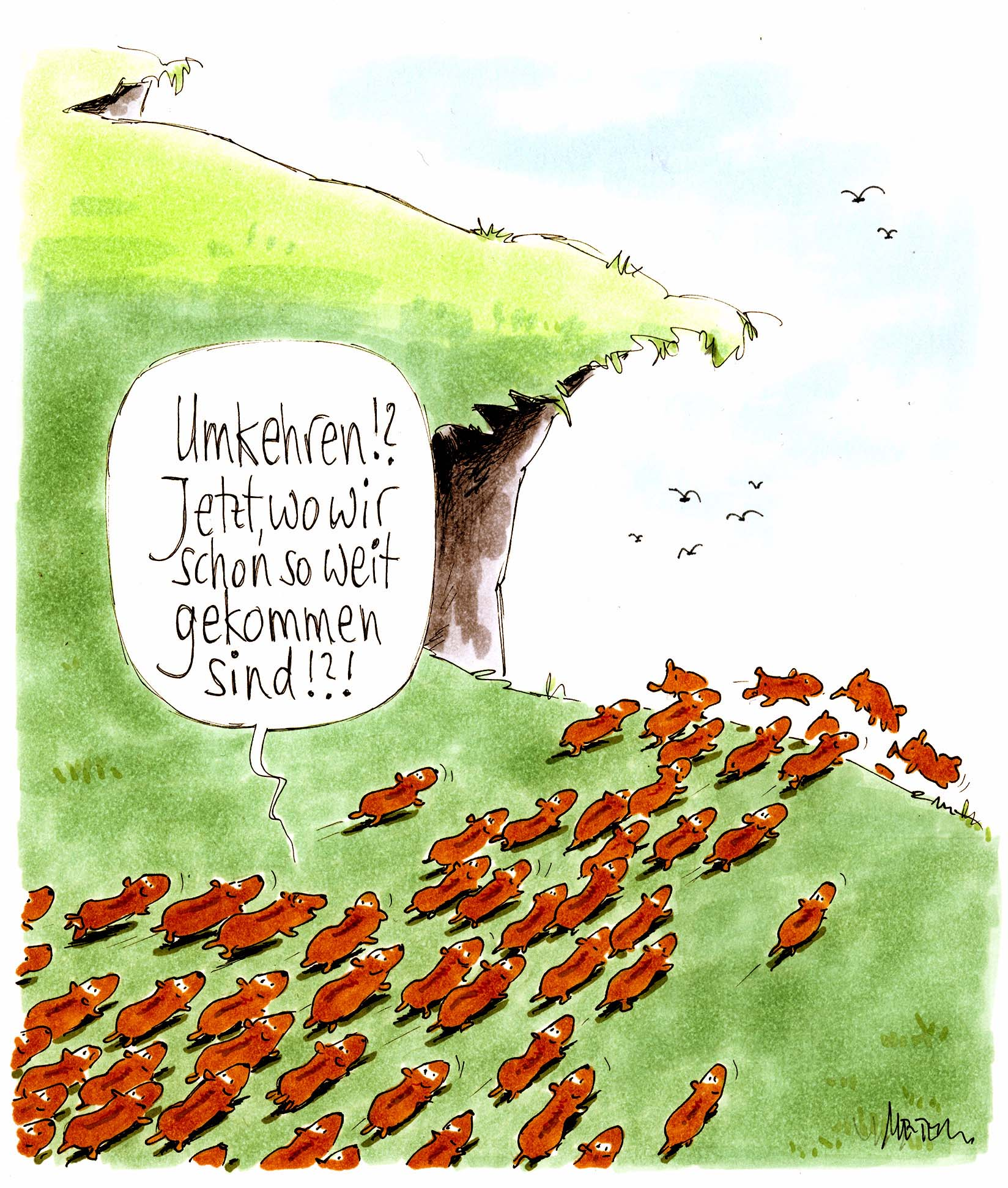
A cartoon depicting lemmings jumping off a cliff en masse (The German text translates to "Turn back!? Now that we've come this far!?!")

Lemmings have become the subject of a widely popular misconception that they are driven to commit mass suicide when they migrate by jumping off cliffs or drowning in bodies of water. It is true that the local population of some lemmings fluctuates. Contrary to the myth, it is not a deliberate mass suicide, in which animals voluntarily choose to die, but rather a result of their migratory behavior. Driven by strong biological urges, some species of lemmings may migrate in large groups when population density becomes too great. Thus, the unexplained fluctuations in the population of Norwegian lemmings helped give rise to the popular stereotype of the suicidal lemmings, particularly after this behaviour was staged in the Walt Disney documentary White Wilderness in 1958. The misconception itself is much older, dating back to at least the late 19th century. In the August 1877 issue of Popular Science Monthly, apparently suicidal lemmings are presumed to be swimming in the Atlantic Ocean in search of the submerged continent of Lemuria.

== Classification ==
- Order Rodentia
  - Superfamily Muroidea
    - Family Cricetidae
      - Subfamily Arvicolinae: voles, lemmings, and related species
        - Tribe Dicrostonychini
          - Dicrostonyx
            - Northern collared lemming (D. groenlandicus)
            - Ungava collared lemming (D. hudsonius)
            - Nelson's collared lemming (D. nelsoni)
            - Ogilvie Mountains collared lemming (D. nunatakensis)
            - Richardson's collared lemming (D. richardsoni)
            - Arctic lemming (D. torquatus)
            - Unalaska collared lemming (D. unalascensis)
        - Tribe Lemmini
          - Lemmus
            - Amur lemming (L. amurensis)
            - Norway lemming (L. lemmus)
            - Beringian lemming (L. nigripes)
            - East Siberian lemming (L. paulus)
            - West Siberian lemming (L. sibiricus)
            - North American brown lemming (L. trimucronatus)
          - Myopus
            - Wood lemming (M. schisticolor)
          - Synaptomys
            - Northern bog lemming (S. borealis)
            - Southern bog lemming (S. cooperi)
        - Tribe Lagurini
          - Eolagurus
            - Yellow steppe lemming (E. luteus)
            - Przewalski's steppe lemming (E. przewalskii)
          - Lagurus
            - Steppe lemming (L. lagurus)

== In popular culture and media ==
The misconception of lemming "mass suicide" is long-standing and has been popularized by a number of factors. Due to this misconception, "lemming" is sometimes used allegorically to describe humans who exhibit a lack of independent thinking and a willingness to follow orders from superiors, social trends, or fads even to the point of self-harm. A similar term is sheeple.

James Thurber's 1941 short story "Interview with a Lemming" ends with the human scientist wondering why lemmings all rush down to the sea and drown themselves, and the lemming replying that it wonders why humans don't.

The myth was mentioned in "The Marching Morons", a 1951 short story by Cyril M. Kornbluth.

In 1955, Disney Studio illustrator Carl Barks drew an Uncle Scrooge adventure comic with the title "The Lemming with the Locket". This comic, which was inspired by a 1953 American Mercury article, showed massive numbers of lemmings jumping over Norwegian cliffs.

Perhaps the most influential and infamous presentation of the myth was the 1958 Disney film White Wilderness, which won an Academy Award for Documentary Feature and in which producers threw lemmings off a cliff to their deaths to fake footage of a "mass suicide", as well as faked scenes of mass migration. A Canadian Broadcasting Corporation documentary, Cruel Camera, found the lemmings used for White Wilderness were flown from Hudson Bay to Calgary, Alberta, Canada, where, far from "casting themselves bodily out into space" (as the film's narrator states), they were, in fact, dumped off the cliff by the camera crew from a truck. Because of the limited number of lemmings at their disposal, which in any case were the wrong subspecies, the migration scenes were simulated using tight camera angles and a large, snow-covered turntable.

In the animated Disney film Zootopia (2016), lemmings are employed as investment bankers of Lemmings Brothers, named after the bank that went bankrupt in 2008.
