= Richardson's collared lemming =

Conservation status
- Least Concern (IUCN 3.1)

Scientific classification
- Kingdom: Animalia
- Phylum: Chordata
- Class: Mammalia
- Order: Rodentia
- Family: Cricetidae
- Subfamily: Arvicolinae
- Genus: Dicrostonyx
- Species: D. richardsoni

Binomial name
- Dicrostonyx richardsoni Merriam, 1900
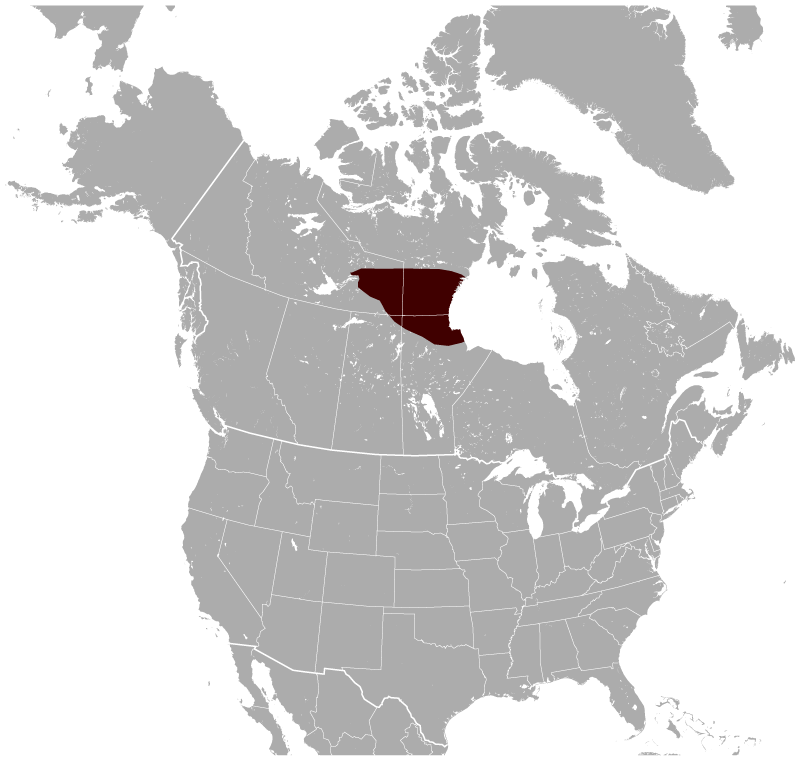
- Richardson's collared lemming range

Species of rodent

The Richardson's collared lemming (Dicrostonyx richardsoni) is a small North American lemming. At one time, they were considered to be a subspecies of the Arctic lemming, Dicrostonyx torquatus. Some sources believe they are a subspecies of the northern collared lemming, Dicrostonyx groenlandicus.

This species has a short, chunky body covered with grizzled brown fur, which varies from red-brown to grey-brown, with a thin dark stripe along its back and a reddish-grey belly. It has small ears, short legs and a very short tail, and a reddish collar across its chest. In winter, it is covered with white fur, and develops enlarged digging claws on its front feet. It is about 13 cm (5.1 in) long with a 1 cm (0.39 in) tail, and weighs about 60 g (2.1 oz).

These animals are found in the tundra west of Hudson Bay in north-central Canada. They feed on grasses, sedges and other green vegetation in summer and twigs of willow, aspen and birches in winter. Predators include snowy owls, mustelids, and Arctic foxes.

Females have two or three litters of four to eight young in a year. The young are born in a nest in a burrow or concealed in vegetation.

They are active year-round, day and night. They make runways through the surface vegetation and also dig burrows above the permafrost. They burrow under the snow in winter. Lemming populations go through a three- or four-year cycle of boom and bust. When their population peaks, lemmings disperse from overcrowded areas.

== Etymology ==
This animal was named after Sir John Richardson, a Scottish naturalist who explored the Canadian Arctic.
