= Unalaska collared lemming =

Conservation status
- Data Deficient (IUCN 3.1)

Scientific classification
- Kingdom: Animalia
- Phylum: Chordata
- Class: Mammalia
- Order: Rodentia
- Family: Cricetidae
- Subfamily: Arvicolinae
- Genus: Dicrostonyx
- Species: D. unalascensis

Binomial name
- Dicrostonyx unalascensis Merriam, 1900

Synonyms
- Dicrostonyx groenlandicus unalascensis Merriam, 1900; Dicrostonyx unalascensis stevensoni E. W. Nelson, 1929; Dicrostonyx stevensoni E. W. Nelson, 1929

Species of rodent

The Unalaska collared lemming (Dicrostonyx unalascensis), also known as the Umnak Island collared lemming, is a species of rodent in the family Cricetidae, which includes the voles, lemmings and related species. This species is found on two islands, Umnak and Unalaska, in the Aleutian Archipelago of Alaska in the United States. Its natural habitat is tundra.

== Taxonomy ==
The Unalaska collared lemming was first formally described in 1900 by the American zoologist Clinton Hart Merriam, with its type locality given as Unalaska, Alaska. This species has been regarded as a subspecies of the northern collared lemming (D. groenlandicus), but is now regarded as a valid species. This species belongs to the genus Dicrostonyx, the collared or varying lemmings, which is in the tribe Dicrostonychini of the subfamily Arvicolinae in the family Cricetidae.

== Description ==
The Unalaska collared lemming is a short-bodied, robust rodent with a thick fur which, unlike other collared lemmings, does not vary with the season. They are around 112 g (4.0 oz) with a length of about 16 cm (6.3 in). The coat is light to dark grey with a buff to reddish-brown tone, with dark lines down the back and on the sides of the head. Their close relatives grow additional claws in the winter to dig in ice and snow, but these lemmings do not.

== Distribution and habitat ==
The Unalaska collared lemming is endemic to the Aleutian Islands of Umnak and Unalaska. Its habitat is tundra, especially in sandy beach soils suitable for burrowing.

== Biology ==
The Unalaska collared lemming is little known, but it is thought that, like other lemmings, the population undergoes cyclical expansions and contractions. The females undergo estrus for around 9 days; this occurs several times during the breeding season, which lasts from January to September. Pregnancy runs for 19-21 days, giving birth to as many as 11 young; each female has 2 to 3 litters in a year. The young are weaned at 15 to 20 days old.

These mammals are herbivorous.
