= Xerocole =

Any animal adapted to live in the desert

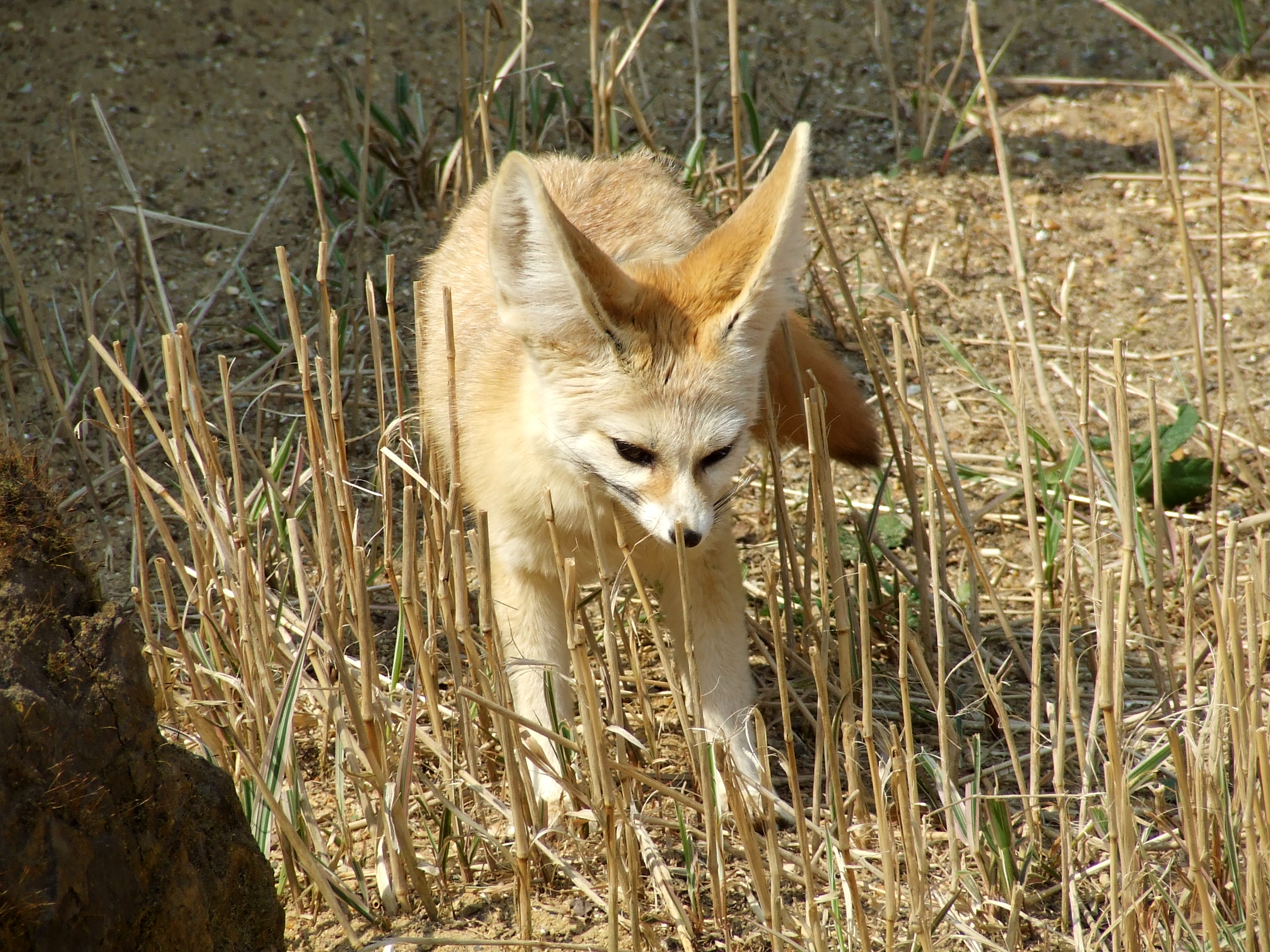
The fennec fox's large ears help keep it cool: when the blood vessels dilate, blood from the body cycles in and dissipates over the expanded surface area.

A xerocole (from Greek xēros /ˈzɪroʊs/ 'dry' and Latin col(ere) 'to inhabit'), is a generic term in ecology and evolutionary biology describing any terrestrial animal who has adapted to live in deserts (which typically have a hot desert climate) or other arid habitats such as rain shadowed highland regions, which have a cold desert climate.

The main environmental challenges xerocoles must overcome are the lack of drinkable fresh water and the extreme heat — often with significant diurnal temperature variation (i.e. very hot during daytime but very cold during nighttime) — as well as the relative paucity of forageable food due to the lack of moist soil needed to support vegetations (which are essential for a sustainable food web). To conserve body water, xerocoles avoid unnecessary evaporative (via perspiration and mucosal evaporation) and excretory (via urine and feces) fluid losses by evolving specialized anatomy and physiology, as well as behavioral adaptations for reducing unwanted fluid loss and obtaining moisture from food. Some are so adept at conserving water that they do not need to consume liquid water at all.

Thermoregulation among endothermic xerocoles (mammals and birds) is often an additional physiological tradeoff between need to conserve body water and the need for better cooling, which typically involve larger area of bare skin (hence more perspiratory moisture loss) as well as increased mucosal evaporation via panting. To decrease such tradeoff, such xerocoles are typically fossorial (i.e. living in underground burrows) and tend to be either nocturnal or crepuscular (i.e. most active at dawn and dusk) in order to avoid unnecessary solar heating during daytime.

== Water conservation ==
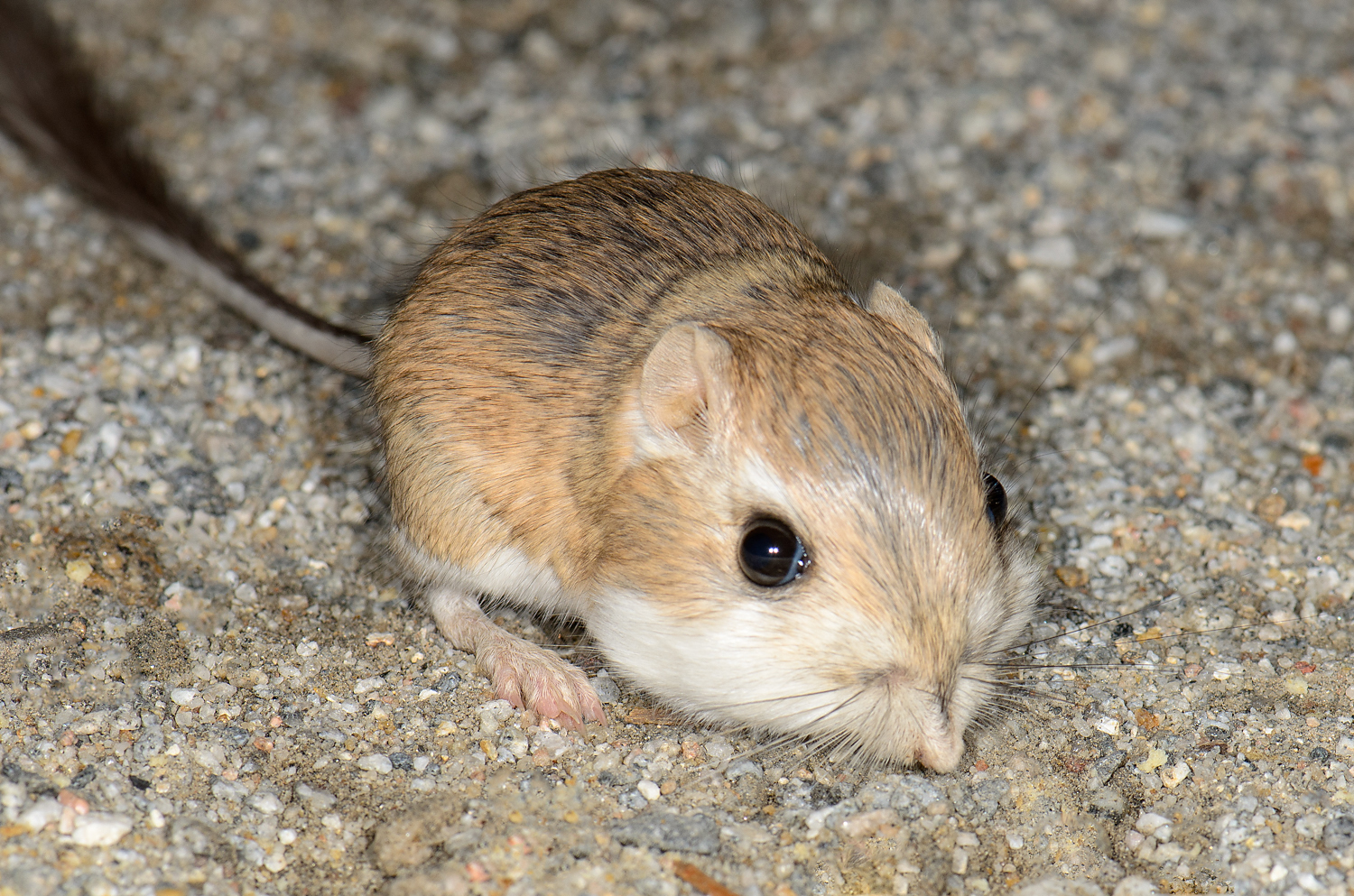
A kangaroo rat can live its entire life without ever having to drink.

=== Avoiding evaporation ===
Xerocoles have developed a variety of mechanisms to reduce water loss via evaporation. Mammalian xerocoles sweat much less than their non-desert counterparts. For example, the camel can survive ambient temperatures as high as 49 °C (120 °F) without sweating, and the kangaroo rat lacks sweat glands entirely. Both birds and mammals in the desert have oils on the surface of their skin to "waterproof" it and inhibit evaporation.

Desert insects use a similar method, as their cuticles are waxy to prevent water from escaping; however, at critical temperatures (ex. 30 °C (86 °F) for cockroaches), the wax molecules in the cuticle rearrange to become permeable and permit evaporative cooling.

Amphibious xerocoles, such as species of the frog genus Phyllomedusa, have wax-like coatings on their skin to reduce water loss. The frogs secrete lipids from glands in their skin: when their skin begins to dry out, they move their limbs over the glands on their backs, and wipe the lipids over their bodies. Other desert amphibians, such as the frog genus Cyclorana, avoid desiccation by burrowing underground during dry periods and forming a cocoon from shed skin: rather than being sloughed off, the skin remains attached to create the cocoon. As skin layers amass, water impermeability increases.

==== During evaporation ====
Though desert birds lack sweat glands, they can still take advantage of evaporative cooling by panting, which cools the trachea and lungs, and gular flapping, which consists of rapidly fluttering the gular skin to move air over the inner mouth and throat. Kangaroo rats and other small mammals use evaporative cooling in a similar way. When air is respired, water evaporates from the nose, cooling the surface of the nasal passages to approximately 24 °C (75 °F). The low temperature causes moisture to condense, partially making up for the water that was lost. The process, called respiratory heat exchange, works best when the walls of the nasal passage have a large surface area.

Some animals pour bodily fluids on themselves to take advantage of evaporative cooling. Xerocole birds such as storks, New World vultures, and ibis urinate on their legs, while desert tortoises sometimes salivate on their neck and front legs to keep cool. Similarly, many rodents and marsupials lick themselves to spread saliva, though this only remains effective for a short time, and requires the fur to become very damp.

=== Excretion ===
==== Urine ====
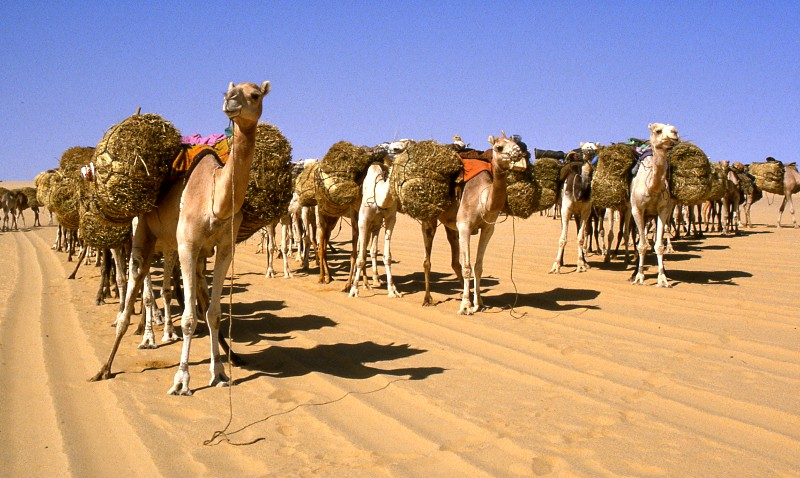
Arabian camels can survive several days and travel up to 160 kilometres (100 mi) without water. One way they save water is by excreting very concentrated urine.

To excrete nitrogenous waste products, mammals (and most amphibians) excrete urea diluted in water. Such xerocoles have adapted to make their urine as concentrated as possible (i.e. use the least amount of water) to dissolve urea. Desert mammals have longer and more deeply inset nephrons, as well as smaller and fewer cortical and juxtamedullary glomeruli (glomeruli being capillary networks where both fluid and waste are extracted from blood). This in turn leads to a smaller glomerular filtration rate, and on the whole, less water is transferred from the blood to the kidney. The kidneys of desert mammals are also better adapted at reabsorbing water from the tubular fluid: though there are fewer glomeruli, the xerocole has larger juxtamedullary glomeruli than cortical glomeruli (the former playing an important role in concentrating urine), whereas the opposite is true for non-xerocoles. Desert mammals also have longer loops of Henle, structures whose efficiency in concentrating urine is directly proportional to their length. The efficiency of their loops of Henle is augmented by the increased antidiuretic hormone in their blood.

Desert amphibians can store more nitrogen than aquatic ones, and do so when not enough water is available to excrete the nitrogen as urea. The African reed frog can store excess nitrogen in iridophore, pigmented granules in its skin, by converting the nitrogen to guanine, which makes up the majority of the iridophores' composition.

Reptiles, birds, insects, and some amphibious species excrete nitrogenous waste as uric acid rather than urea. Uric acid is less toxic than urea and largely water insoluble.

==== Feces ====
Most animal feces are over 75% water; xerocoles, however, reabsorb water in the gut and produce much drier feces. For example, the kangaroo rat's feces contain only 1/6 as much water as that of other, non-desert rodents. In insects, the rectal gland also absorbs water, and the insects excrete dry pellets. In birds, along with some other vertebrates, the ureter and rectum both lead to the cloaca, whose walls also absorb water.

=== Other methods ===
Camels can further conserve water by closing an orifice in their stomach to create two compartments: one for water and one for food.

Seed-eating rodents maintain a low metabolic rate to reduce water lost to respiration (and to prevent their burrow from overheating). Rodent mothers produce concentrated milk for their young, and then eat their young's dilute urine and feces to regain some of the water that was lost. Desert canids and kangaroos eat their own young's excrement for the same reason.

The Australian water-holding frog conserves water by retaining urine in the bladder, swelling up like a balloon; it then uses its bladder as a water reserve during the dry season.

== Alternative water sources ==
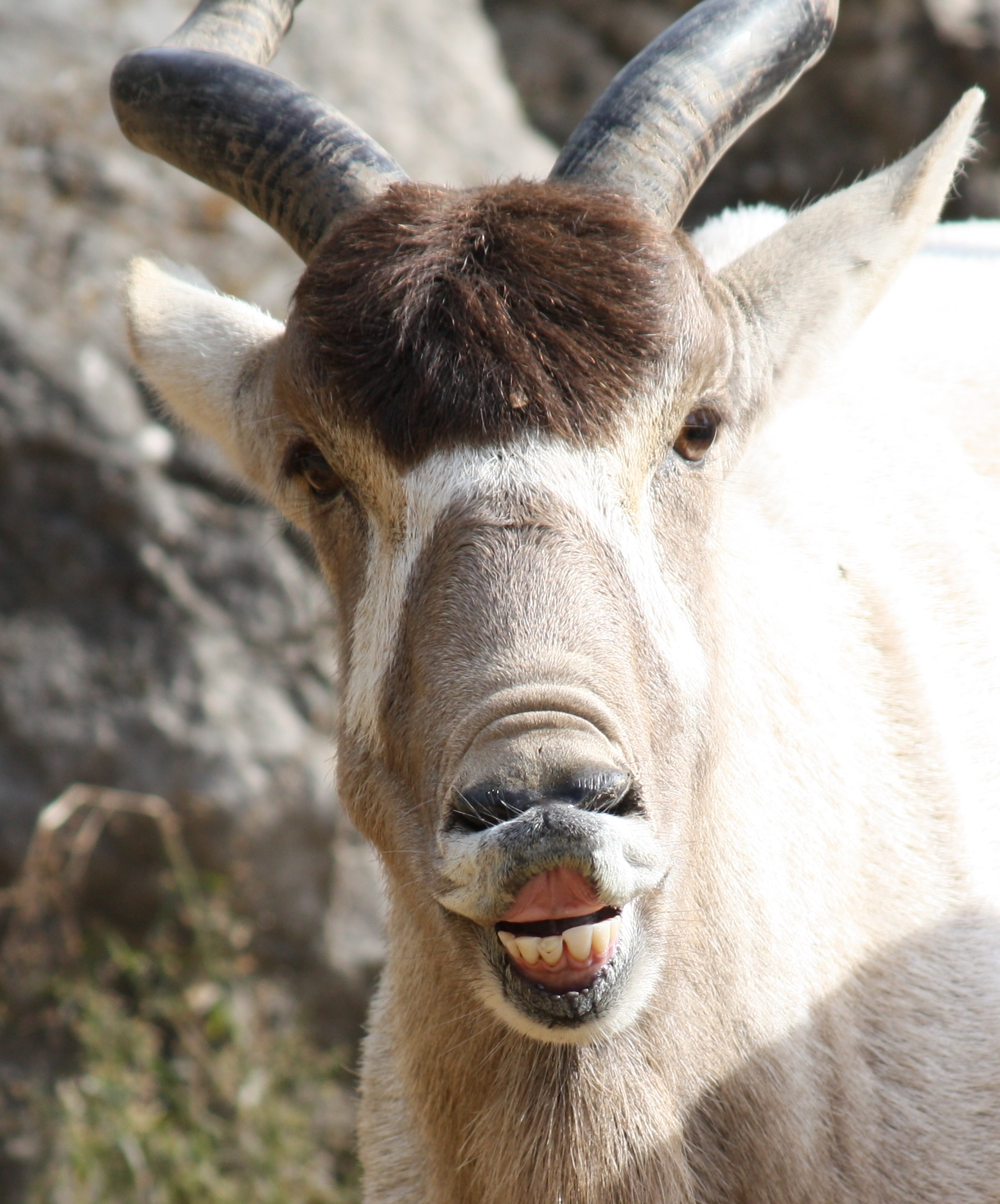
Some antelope, such as the addax (pictured) and the oryx, are so efficient at getting water from plants that they never need to drink.

Xerocoles get a substantial amount of hygroscopic water from their food. Many feed on moisture-filled plants: the aardvark obtains water from wild cucumbers (Cucumis humifructus) and the camel eats succulents and bushes in the winter, getting enough water to go two months without drinking. The oryx eats Acacia leaves late at night, when water content is highest: in the hot, arid daytime the leaves are only 1% water; but in cooler, more humid night the leaves are 40% water. Some xerocoles are able to obtain water from halophytic (saltwater) plants, as they can metabolize high amounts of oxalic acid and produce very concentrated urine. The chisel-toothed kangaroo rat also mitigates the saltiness of the halophyte it eats (the shadscale) by using its broad, sharp lower incisors to scrape off the leaves' salty outerlayer to reach the less-salty center.

Carnivores derive water from their prey's meat and blood. Insectivores, such as the aardwolf (a type of hyena) and the southern grasshopper mouse, are thus largely independent from free water.

Xerocoles obtain a large percentage of their water from the metabolic processes used to break down their food. The water gained from fat is nearly twice the amount gained from carbohydrates, as the former contains more hydrogen (which determines the amount of water produced). The water gained from metabolism is more than enough to offset the water lost from evaporation in the lungs (which increases due to the need for oxygen to break down food).

== Thermal regulation ==
=== Morphology ===
Xerocoles such as the hare have large ears that help them keep cool: when the ears stand up, blood flow increases to the numerous vessels there and heat is dissipated. However, at 48 °C (118 °F), the cape hare near Abu Dhabi, UAE sits in the shade and drapes its ears over itself, as erecting them in such weather would absorb more heat.

Desert animals have less fat than their non-desert counterparts, as fat would act as insulation, so retaining heat. What fat they do have is localized, such as in the camel's hump or the bison's neck. In terms of fur, however, desert animals have thick insulating coats that impede the conduction of heat towards the body. The coats are not uniformly distributed, but rather leave sparsely covered patches called "thermal windows" at the axilla, groin, scrotum, and mammary glands. Heat can be dissipated from thermal windows via convection and conduction.

Similarly, desert birds have fewer feathers on the underwing and flank – heat stress induces some birds to raise their wings, increasing the surface area of exposed skin. Birds adjust their feathers to create or dissipate an insulating layer, as typified by the ostrich. At high temperatures, the ostrich elevates its long dorsal feathers to create a barrier against solar radiation while allowing air to move across the skin's surface. In the cool nights, the feathers lower and interlock, trapping an insulating layer above the skin.

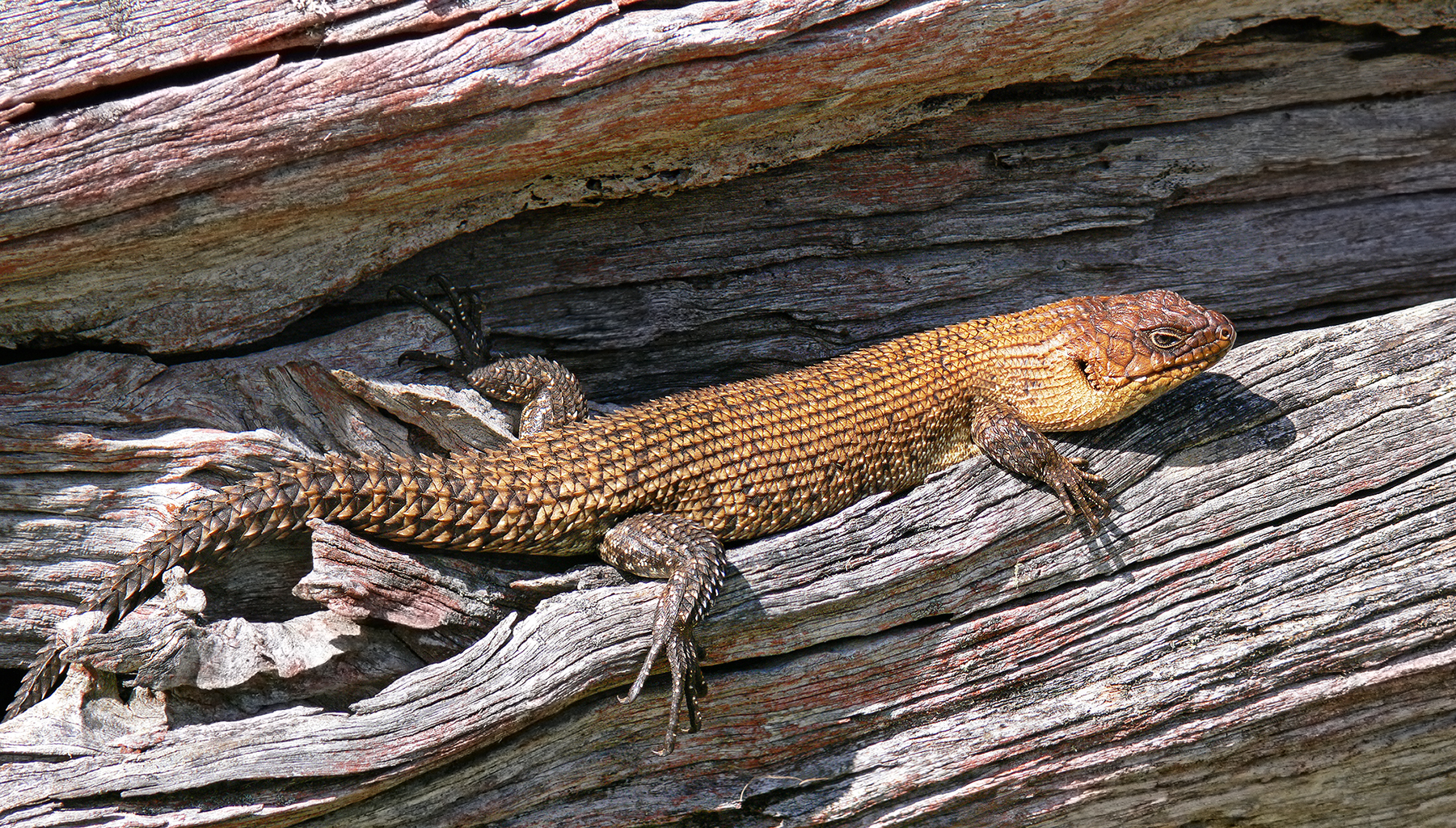
Ectotherms, such as this Cunningham's spiny-tailed skink, often bask in the sun to regulate body temperature.

=== Burrows ===
Most small xerocoles live in burrows to avoid the desert heat. The burrows act as microenvironments: when they are deeper than 50–60 cm (20–24 in) below the surface, they maintain humidity and temperatures between 30 and 32 °C (86 and 90 °F), regardless of external weather. Some animals seal their burrows to keep them moist.

Ectotherms also use burrows as a means to keep warm in the cold desert nights. As ectotherms are usually small and unable to store their own body heat, they quickly take on the external temperature of the environment, which necessitates controlled microenvironments. For example, while reptiles are able to operate at temperatures exceeding optima, they become sluggish when cold. As such, they spend their nights in burrows or crevices, where they create warm environments by quickly generating metabolic heat. Desert lizards usually use other animals' burrows to meet their purposes.

=== Circadian rhythms ===
All desert rodents except ground squirrels and chipmunks are nocturnal. Amphibians are usually nocturnal as well, while many other xerocoles are diurnal, but reduce activity at midday and increase in the mornings and evenings. Some xerocoles change their activity patterns depending on the season: nocturnal ants, for example, become diurnal during colder periods.

Many xerocoles, especially rodents, estivate in the summer, becoming more dormant. Some desert amphibians estivate underground for over a year at a time. Unlike hibernation, which leads to a state of torpor, estivation induces lethargy, and can go unnoticed in some animals if their body temperature is not measured.

== Protection from the sun ==
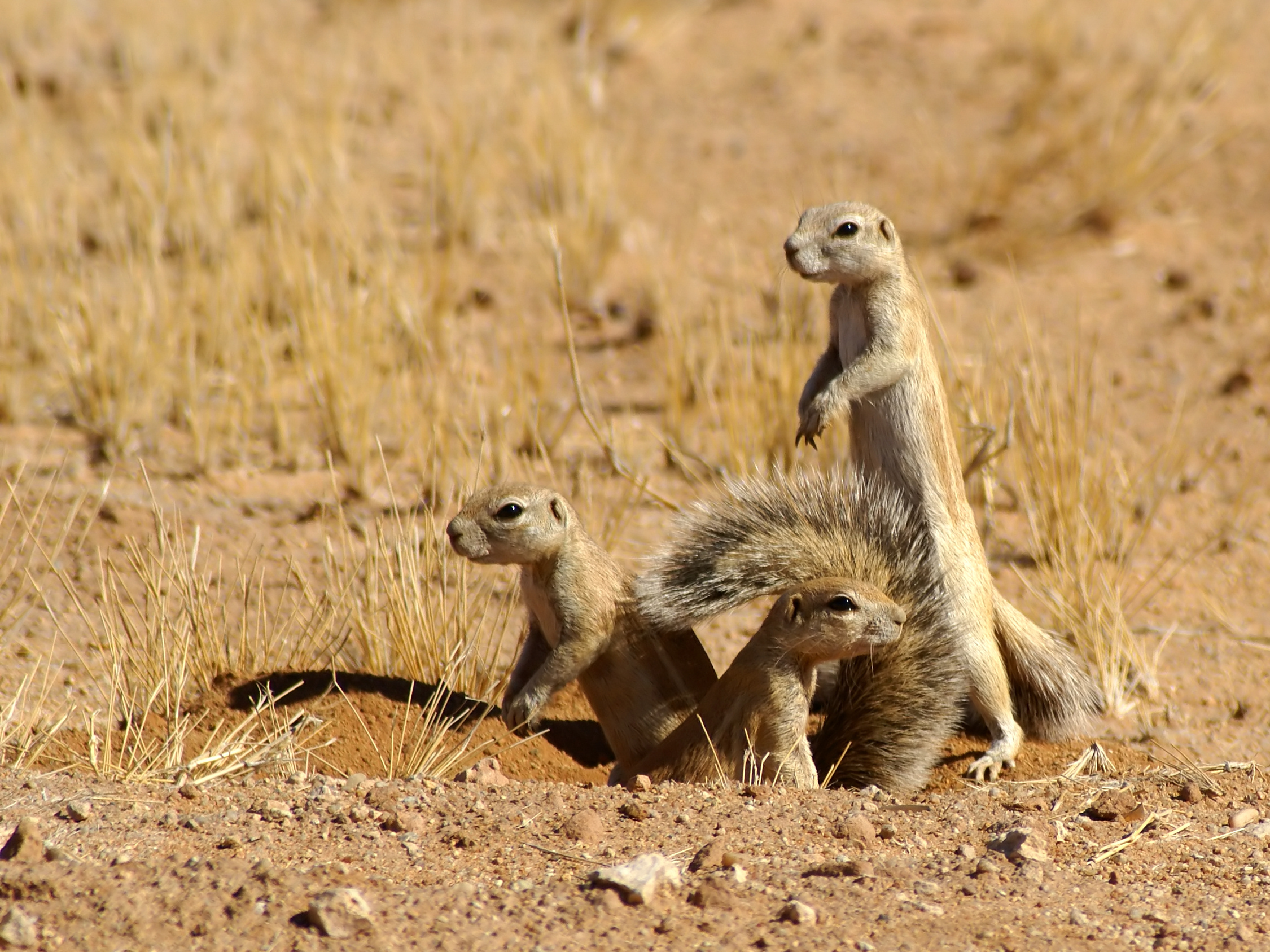
When the Cape ground squirrel scurries from one shady spot to the next, it holds its wide, flat tail over its back to provide shade.

Xerocoles are usually light, often described as being similar color to sand as a means to reflect solar radiation and reduce heat absorption. Some Xerocoles change color with the seasons to reflect more sunlight in the summer: addaxes change from gray-brown to nearly white. Iguanid lizards can change color on a much smaller time scale by varying melanin concentration. They become darker when burrowing and lighter when basking – both the desert iguana and the zebra-tailed lizard become so pale that they appear to shine due to the amount of light they reflect.

Most desert lizards also have a black peritoneal lining in their abdominal cavity to absorb UV radiation and prevent it from damaging internal organs.

Shade under shrubbery provides resting spots for diurnal lizards, nesting sites for birds, as well as temporary oases for diurnal rodents, who skirt among shady spots. Large animals such as camels and carnivores also spend the hottest parts of the day under shade.

== Protection from sand ==
Desert animals such as the camel, addax, and kangaroo rat have large feet to prevent them from sinking in the sand. The fennec fox has extra fur on the soles of its feet to give it traction and protect it from the hot sand. Most animals in arid environments are slender with long legs, giving them the speed as they travel long distances for food and water.

The three main vulnerabilities against the sand are through the eyes, ears, and nose. To keep sand out of their eyes, xerocoles including reptiles and birds, and some amphibians and mammals have a nictitating membrane in their eyes: a third, transparent eyelid that protects the cornea from blowing sand and can dislodge it from the eye. Reptiles also have eyes the size of pinholes or protected by valves. To keep sand out of their ears, mammals such as the camel and the sand cat have long hairs protruding from them. The camel and the saiga antelope also have adaptations to protect their noses from sand: the former has narrow nostrils it can close, and the latter has a large nose with its nostrils set wide apart and far back to prevent sand from entering when grazing. Reptile diggers have nostrils that face upwards instead of forwards for the same reason.

== Speed ==
Xerocoles, having to travel long distances for food and water, are often adapted for speed, and have long limbs, feet that prevent them from sinking in the sand, and are overall slender in form. As there is little cover to protect them from predators, desert animals also use speed as a defense mechanism. For example, a desert jackrabbit can run much faster than a coyote; as such, "an ordinary wolf or coyote will not attempt to chase him, for they realize the hopelessness of it."

== Known xerocoles ==
The following animals are known xerocoles:

- Aardvark
- Aardwolf
- Acanthodactylus
- Addax
- African leopard
- African lion
- African savanna hare
- African wild ass
- African wild dog
- American badger
- Antelope jackrabbit
- Ankole-Watusi
- Arabian camel
- Arabian leopard
- Arabian gazelle
- Arabian oryx
- Arabian red fox
- Arabian sand gazelle
- Arabian wildcat
- Arabian wolf
- Arizona bark scorpion
- Arizona black rattlesnake
- Arizona woodpecker
- Armadillo girdled lizard
- Bactrian camel
- Barbary sheep
- Bearded dragon
- Big brown bat
- Big free-tailed bat
- Black-tailed jackrabbit
- Blanford's fox
- Bobcat
- Bolson tortoise
- Burro
- Cactus wren
- Cactus mouse
- Cairo spiny mouse
- California leaf-nosed bat
- California myotis
- California quail
- Cape ground squirrel
- Cape hare
- Caracal
- Cave myotis
- Cerastes
- Chipmunk
- Chuckwalla
- Colorado River toad
- Coues' deer
- Collared peccary
- Common desert centipede
- Common genet
- Coyote
- Cunningham's spiny-tailed skink
- Cuvier's gazelle
- Desert bighorn sheep
- Desert box turtle
- Desert cottontail
- Desert elephant
- Desert hedgehog
- Desert horned lizard
- Desert iguana
- Desert kangaroo rat
- Desert kingsnake
- Desert long-eared bat
- Desert monitor
- Desert mule deer
- Desert pipistrelle
- Desert pocket gopher
- Desert tortoise
- Dorcas gazelle
- Dromedary
- Egyptian mongoose
- Elegant quail
- Fat-tailed gerbil
- Fennec fox
- Ferruginous pygmy owl
- Gemsbok
- Gambel's quail
- Ghost-faced bat
- Giant desert centipede
- Gila monster
- Gila woodpecker
- Grasshopper mouse
- Goanna
- Golden jackal
- Gopher tortoise
- Greater long-nosed bat
- Greater mouse-tailed bat
- Greater roadrunner
- Hamadryas baboon
- Hartebeest
- Honey badger
- Hyperolius
- Kangaroo rat
- Kit fox
- Lappet-faced vulture
- Lesser long-nosed bat
- Lesser mouse-tailed bat
- Lesser roadrunner
- Libyan jird
- Mauritanian shrew
- Meerkat
- Mexican free-tailed bat
- Mexican long-tongued bat
- Mexican wolf
- Mojave rattlesnake
- Nine-banded armadillo
- North African gerbil
- Northwest African cheetah
- Nubian ibex
- Onager
- Ostrich
- Pallid bat
- Pocketed free-tailed bat
- Pygmy gerbil
- Red kangaroo
- Rhim gazelle
- Ring-tailed cat
- Round-tailed ground squirrel
- Rueppell's fox
- Saharan shrew
- Saharan silver ant
- Saharan striped polecat
- Saiga antelope
- Sand cat
- Sidewinder rattlesnake
- Scaled quail
- Scimitar oryx
- Silver-haired bat
- Sonoran collared lizard
- Sonoran Desert tortoise
- Sonoran pronghorn
- Southwestern myotis
- Speckled rattlesnake
- Spotted bat
- Spotted hyena
- Striped hyena
- Texas banded gecko
- Texas horned lizard
- Thorny dragon
- Townsend's big-eared bat
- Water-holding frog
- Western black widow
- Western diamondback rattlesnake
- Western mastiff bat
- Western Saharan spiny mouse
- Whitaker's shrew
- White-bellied carpet viper
- Yuma myotis
- Zebra-tailed lizard

== See also ==
- Arid Forest Research Institute (AFRI)
- Chionophile
- Deserts and xeric shrublands
- Xerophile
- Xerophyte
