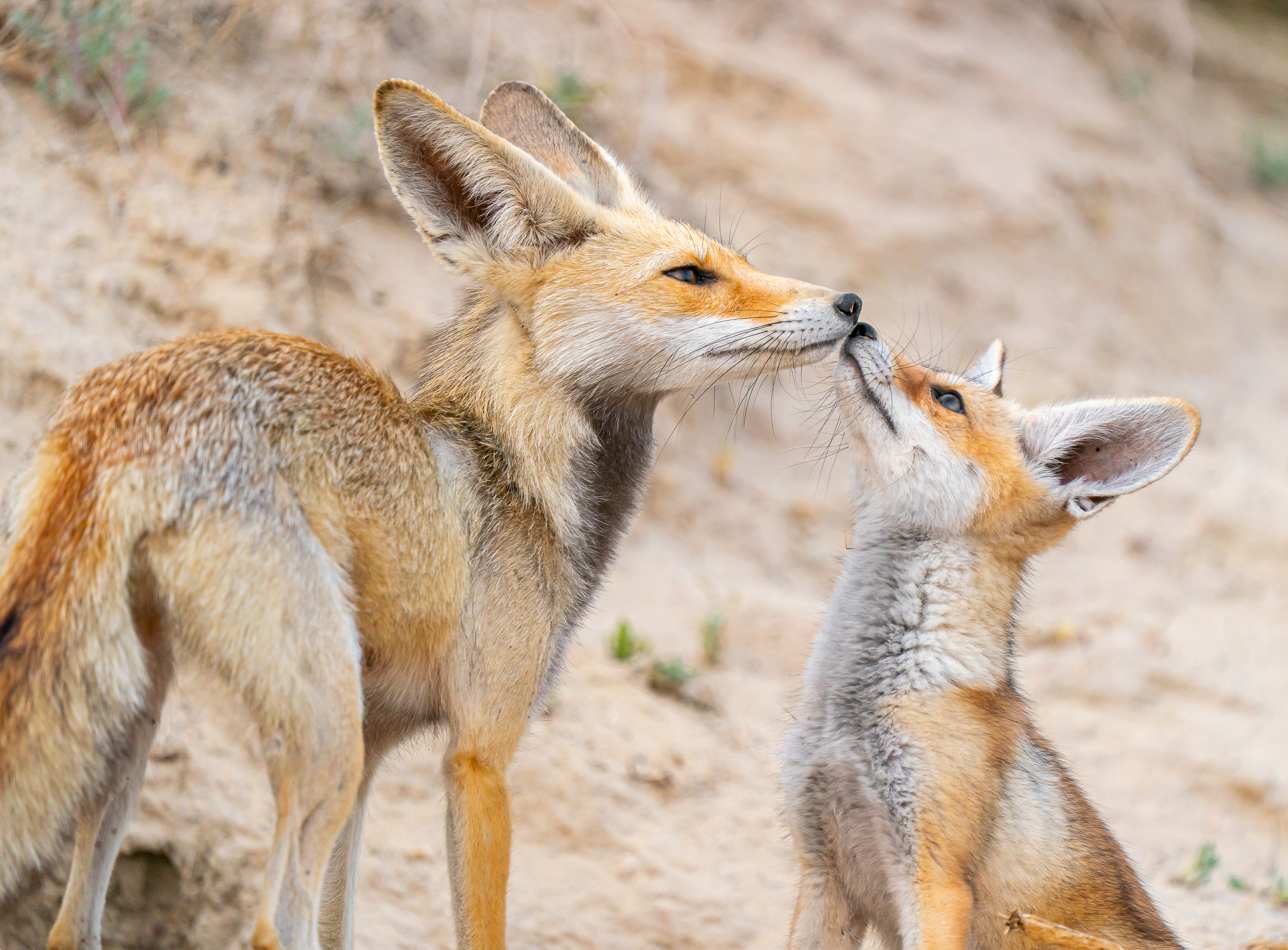
- A mother Arabian red fox with her cub

Scientific classification
- Kingdom: Animalia
- Phylum: Chordata
- Class: Mammalia
- Order: Carnivora
- Family: Canidae
- Genus: Vulpes
- Species: V. vulpes
- Subspecies: V. v. arabica

Trinomial name
- Vulpes vulpes arabica Thomas, 1902

= Arabian red fox =

Subspecies of carnivore

The Arabian red fox (Vulpes vulpes arabica) is a subspecies of the red fox native to the Arabian Peninsula; Kuwait, Jordan, Oman, Qatar, Saudi Arabia, Syria, United Arab Emirates, and Yemen. It may also be present in Iraq and Israel. It is the smallest subspecies of red fox, weighing only 2.7 kg (6.0 lb), and can be distinguished by its large ears and short fur — traits which are adapted for a desert environment.

== Description ==
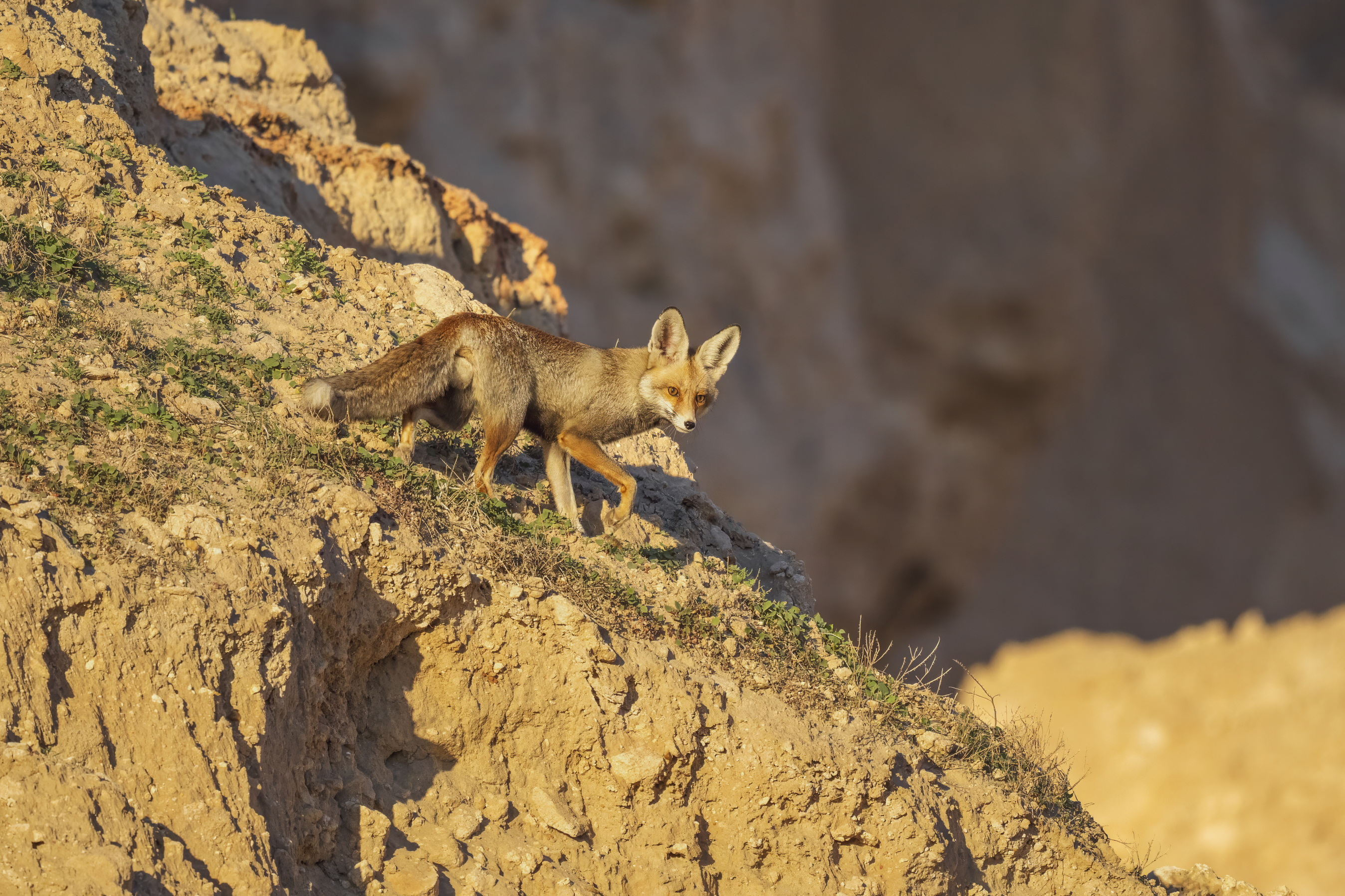
Arabian red fox climbing a mountain in Kuwait in January. Their fur coats become longer in winter, to help protect from the cold

The Arabian red fox is brownish pale red in color, and has fur between its toes, to prevent burning of the feet. It weighs 2.7 kg (6.0 lb) on average. Their fur coat is longer and duller-colored in the winter.

Males tend to be about 15% larger than females, averaging 2.4–3.2 kg (5.3–7.1 lb) in weight and 52–63 cm (20–25 in) in body length, while females weigh 2–3 kg (4.4–6.6 lb) and are 42–58.5 cm (16.5–23.0 in) long. The average height at the shoulders is 32.5–37.5 cm (12.8–14.8 in), and the tail is 25.8–38.3 cm (10.2–15.1 in) long.

The Arabian red fox can look similar to other subspecies of red fox. However, it is more adapted to desert life than its parent species, with its ears being much larger, and its fur is much shorter. It is the smallest subspecies of red fox.

== Behaviour and ecology ==
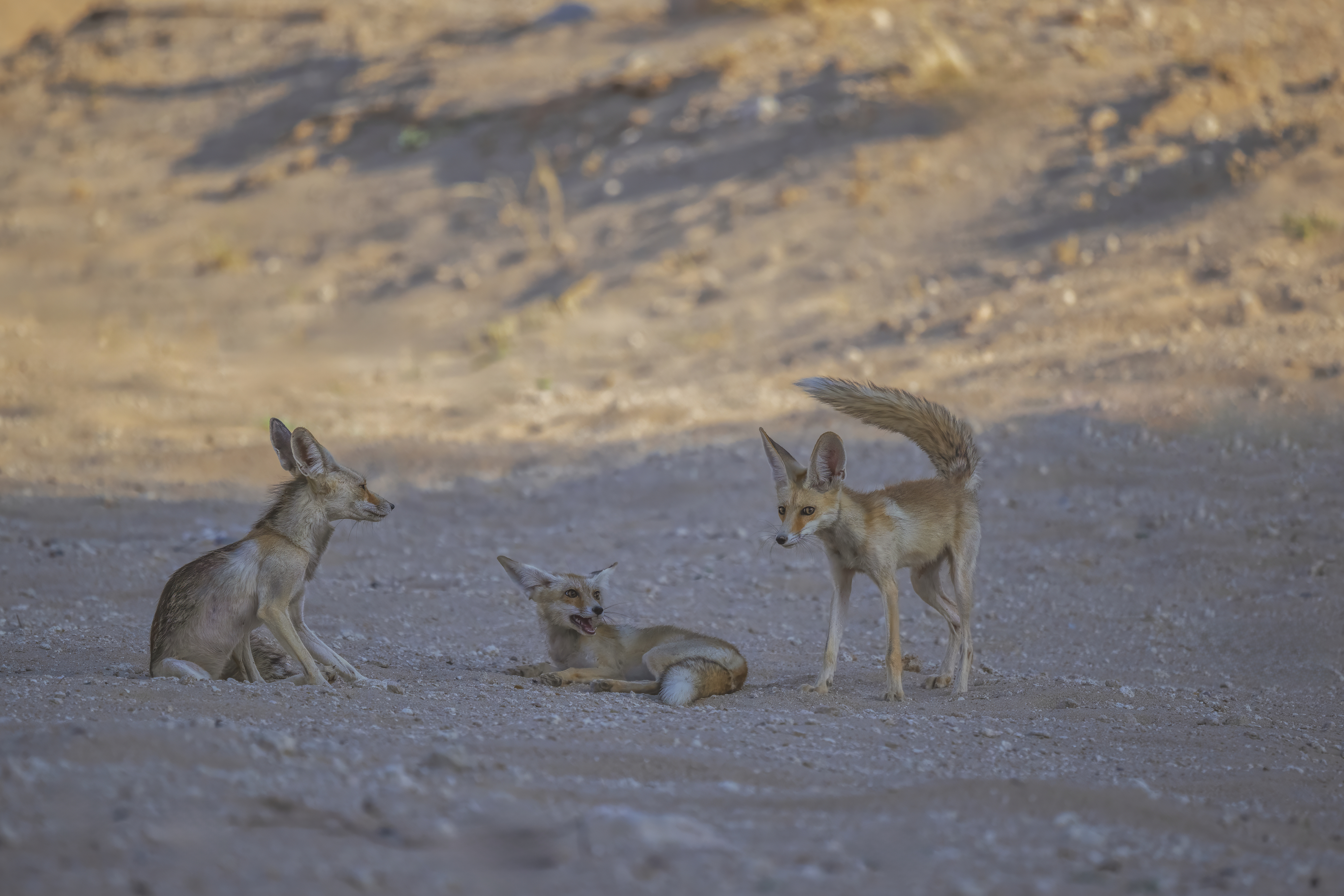
A family of Arabian red foxes lounge in the shade. They can tolerate temperatures of over 50 °C (122 °F)

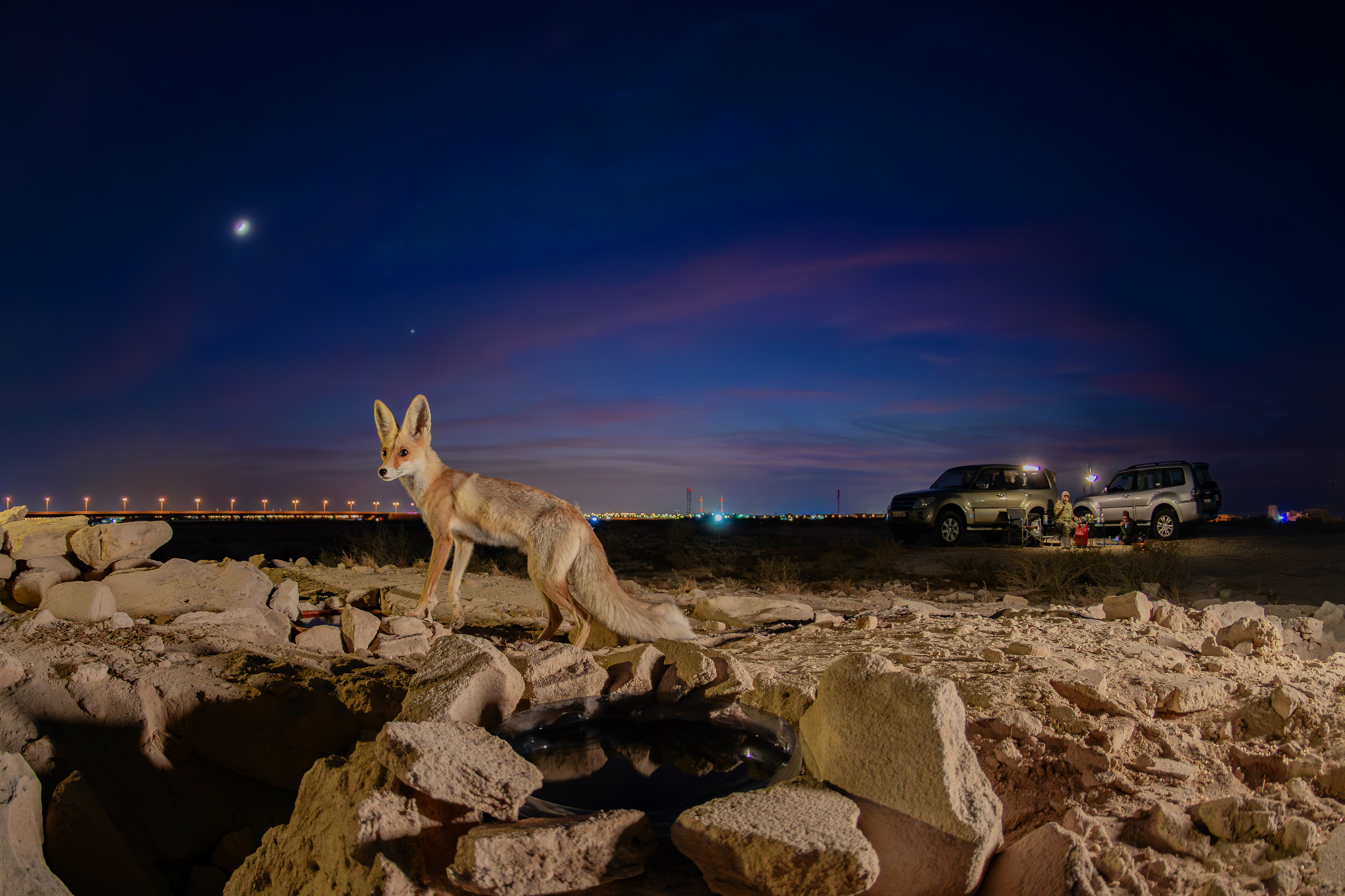
Arabian red fox in Kuwait City. They often live in urban areas, and are most active at night

The Arabian red fox is a mostly solitary animal, but may form loosely-knit social groups of a few individuals. They are nomadic, temporarily occupying defined home ranges. They are most active at night. The young open their eyes 10 days after birth. They live in various environments, including mountains, coasts, deserts, and cities. They can tolerate temperatures from over 50 °C (122 °F) to near freezing. In the wild they have lifespans of 2–4 years, while those in captivity have been observed to live for 10–12 years.

=== Diet ===
The Arabian red fox is an omnivore, and it eats almost anything, including rodents, birds, fish, and carrion.

In the city of Sakaka, northwestern Saudi Arabia, the Arabian red fox has a highly varied diet, with a large amount of scavenged food waste from homes. Notable scavenged food consists of cooked rice, found in the stomachs of 30% of foxes surveyed, the cooked meat of sheep and dromedary camels, and dates. 18% of foxes had accidental ingestion of non-food items, such as tin foil, paper, small pieces of plastic, and clothing.

During turtle breeding season in the Ras Al Hadd Turtle Reserve in Oman, up to 90% of the Arabian red fox's diet consists of green sea turtle eggs and hatchlings.

== See also ==
- Fennec fox
- Blanford's fox
- Arabian wolf
- Arabian wildcat
- Xerocole (animals adapted to deserts)
