= Predicrostonyx =

Predicrostonyx Temporal range: Early Pleistocene

Scientific classification
- Kingdom: Animalia
- Phylum: Chordata
- Class: Mammalia
- Order: Rodentia
- Family: Cricetidae
- Subfamily: Arvicolinae
- Tribe: Dicrostonychini
- Genus: †Predicrostonyx; Guthrie & Matthews, 1971
- Species: †P. hopkinsi

Binomial name
- †Predicrostonyx hopkinsi Guthrie & Matthews, 1971

Extinct genus of rodents

Predicrostonyx hopkinsi is an extinct rodent in the family Cricetidae, and is considered one of the earliest examples of collared lemmings.
