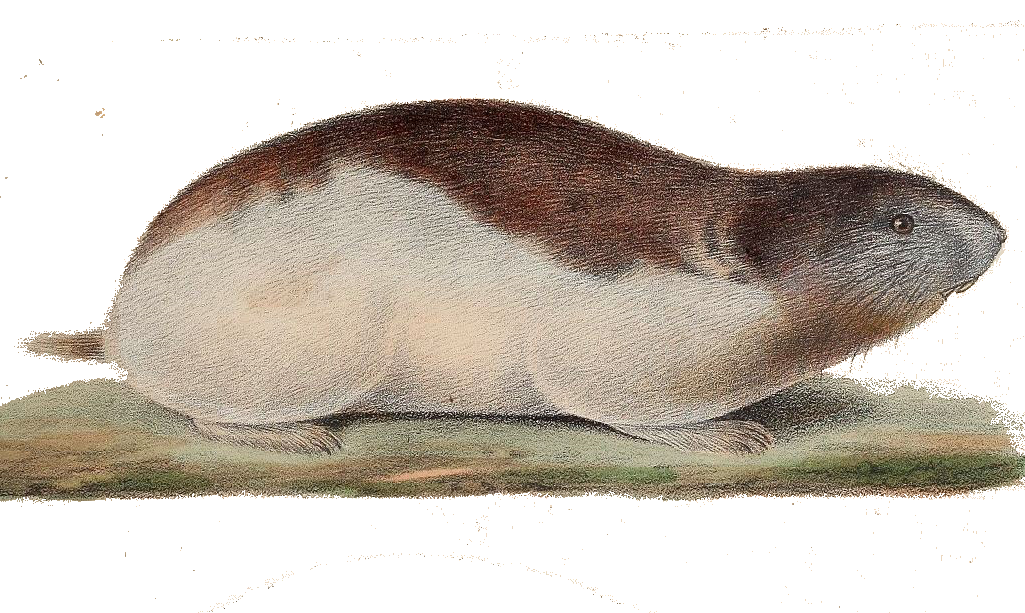
- Arctic lemming (Dicrostonyx torquatus)

Scientific classification
- Kingdom: Animalia
- Phylum: Chordata
- Class: Mammalia
- Order: Rodentia
- Family: Cricetidae
- Subfamily: Arvicolinae
- Tribe: Dicrostonychini; Kretzoi, 1955

Genera
- Dicrostonyx; Predicrostonyx†

= Dicrostonychini =

Tribe of rodents

Dicrostonychini is a tribe of lemmings in the subfamily Arvicolinae. It contains only one extant genus, as well as one extinct genus.

A 2021 study found Dicrostonychini to also include the genera previously placed in the tribe Phenacomyini, and found this combined Dicrostonychini to be the sister group to the muskrats (tribe Ondatrini).
