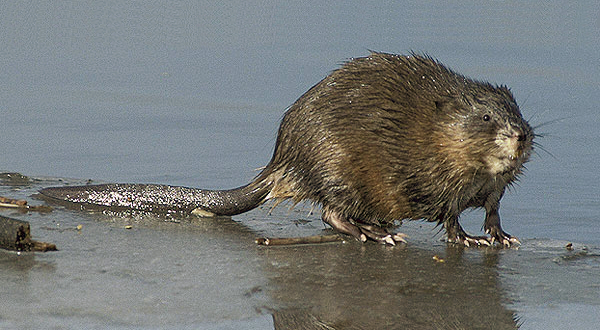
- Muskrat (Ondatra zibethicus)

Scientific classification
- Kingdom: Animalia
- Phylum: Chordata
- Class: Mammalia
- Infraclass: Placentalia
- Order: Rodentia
- Family: Cricetidae
- Subfamily: Arvicolinae
- Tribe: Ondatrini; Gray, 1825

Genera
- Neofiber; Ondatra

= Ondatrini =

Ondatrini Temporal range: Early Pliocene - present, 4–0 Ma

Tribe of rodents

Ondatrini is a tribe of semiaquatic rodents in the family Arvicolinae. They are known as muskrats. They are related to voles and lemmings.

== Classification ==
It contains two extant species, each in its own genus, both of which are native to North America:

- Round-tailed muskrat Neofiber alleni
- Muskrat Ondatra zibethicus

Of these, the muskrat (O. zibethicus) is found throughout North America aside from the warmer or drier regions, and has been introduced to Eurasia. The round-tailed muskrat (N. alleni) is only found in Florida and adjacent Georgia, just outside of the range of O. zibethicus. Some authorities place both genera in different tribes (Ondatrini for Ondatra, Neofibrini for Neofiber), but the American Society of Mammalogists places both in the Ondatrini, and some molecular evidence supports a close relation between both genera. Some phylogenetic evidence indicates that Balkan snow vole (Dinaromys bogdanovi) may also be a member of the Ondatrini, but this is uncertain and it is still classified in the Pliomyini by the ASM.

== Evolution ==
The Ondatrini likely descend from a lineage of Siberian voles that invaded North America about 5 million years ago. The earliest fossils from this tribe are of fossil Ondatra from the early Pliocene. The Pliocene fossil taxa Ogmodontomys and Cosomys, both from North America, are likely also members of this tribe. The Plio-Pleistocene fossil taxa Dolomys, Pliomys (of the tribe Pliomyini), and Kislangia from Eurasia have also been classified in this group by some authorities, but this has been disputed.

A 2021 phylogenetic study found the Ondatrini to form the sister group to the Dicrostonychini (defined as including the members of both Dicrostonychini sensu stricto and Phenacomyini).
