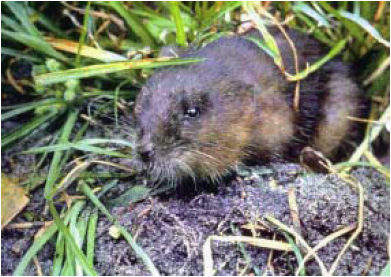

Conservation status
- Least Concern (IUCN 3.1)

Scientific classification
- Kingdom: Animalia
- Phylum: Chordata
- Class: Mammalia
- Infraclass: Placentalia
- Order: Rodentia
- Family: Cricetidae
- Subfamily: Arvicolinae
- Tribe: Ondatrini
- Genus: Neofiber; F. W. True, 1884
- Species: N. alleni

Binomial name
- Neofiber alleni F. W. True, 1884
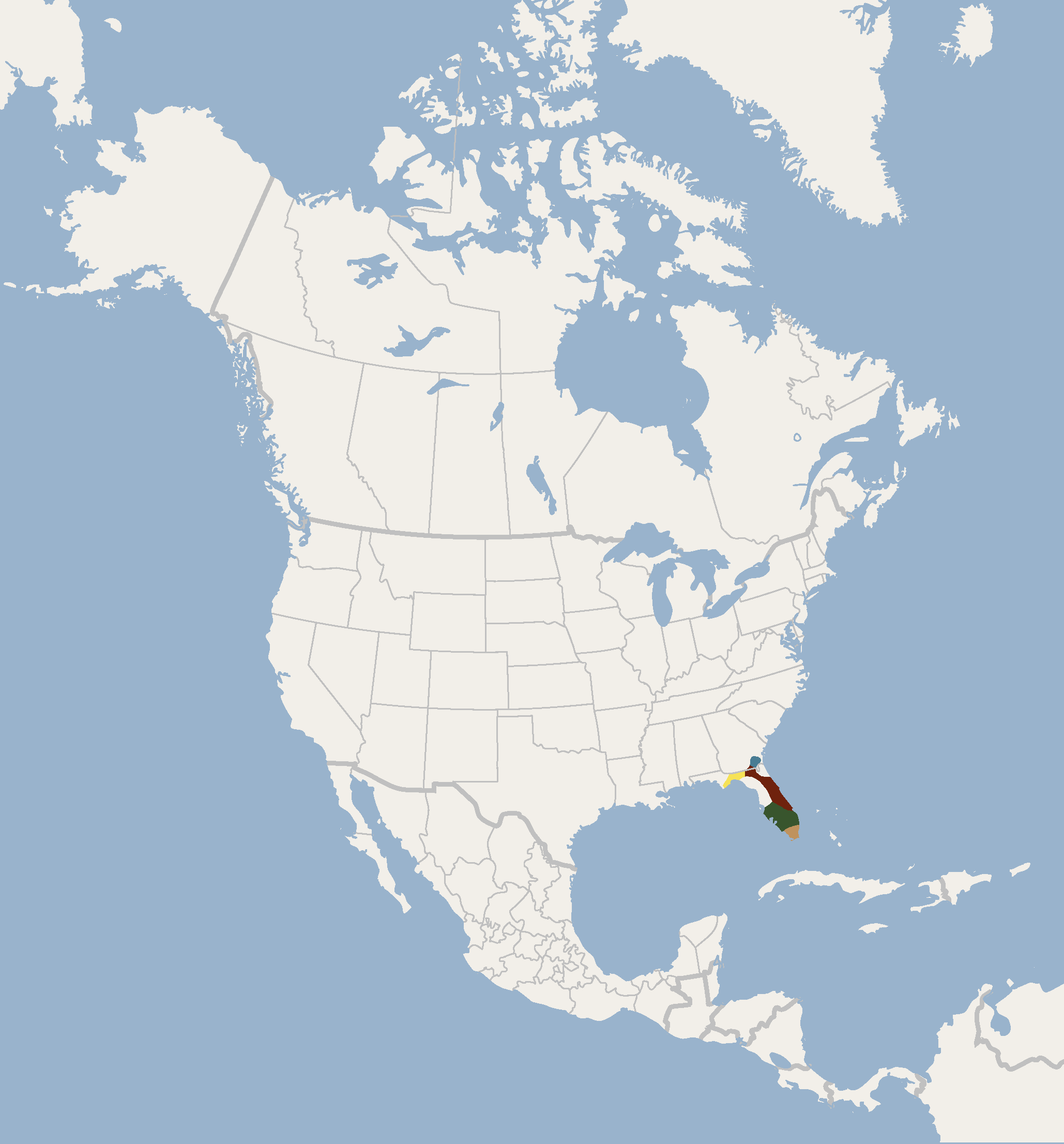
- Geographic range N.a.alleni N.a.apalachicolae N.a.exoristus N.a.nigrescens N.a.struix

= Round-tailed muskrat =

Round-tailed muskrat Temporal range: Middle Pleistocene – recent

Species of rodent

The round-tailed muskrat (Neofiber alleni) is a species of rodent in the family Cricetidae, sometimes called the Florida water rat. The species is the only extant member of the genus Neofiber. It is found only in the Southeastern United States, where its natural habitat is swamps.

== Description ==
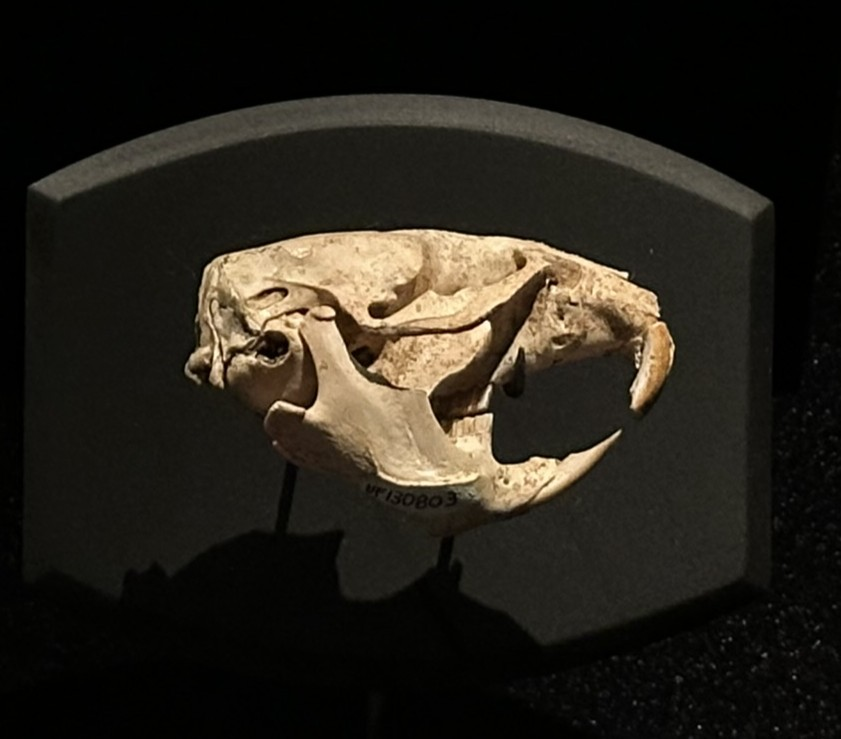
Pleistocene-aged fossil skull of N. alleni, Florida Museum of Natural History

The round-tailed muskrat is a semiaquatic and nocturnal species native to the Southeastern United States. Limited sexual dimorphism is seen among round-tailed muskrats, with female adults weighing an average of 262 grams (9.2 oz) and male adults at a slightly heavier average of 279 grams (9.8 oz). The round-tailed muskrat feeds on emergent aquatic grasses, including aquatic plant stems, seeds, and roots, to sustain its herbivorous lifestyle. The most prominent predators of the round-tailed muskrat are marsh hawks and barn owls, but most predation occurred when the round-tailed muskrats were found outside their normal territory, having been displaced by floods. The pelage of a newborn round-tailed muskrat varies from gray to ash-gray. Adults have a brown pelage with pale fur on the belly. This change in coat color is the result of a juvenile molt (between 7 and 30 days post partum) and a subadult molt (between 35 and 50 days post partum). Molting in round-tailed muskrats has been observed throughout the year, but is more prevalent during the autumn.

== Distribution ==
This muskrat is found through much of Florida and into southeastern Georgia, with the exception of northeastern Florida. This distribution is consistent with round-tailed muskrat fossils found in several Florida locations from the late Pleistocene. It is also consistent with the range of the muskrat (Ondatra zibethicus) that is absent from areas where the round-tailed muskrat inhabits, due to filling the same ecological niche. Population densities of round-tailed muskrats average between 100 and 120 animals per acre of land.

=== Fossil record ===
During the Late Pleistocene, round-tailed muskrats lived in coastal Georgia in the area around what is today Savannah, Georgia.

== Habitat ==
Large, high-quality wetland habitats in Florida and southeastern Georgia that have well-connected patches are preferred. Land areas that experience high grazing pressure from cattle are less likely to house many (if any) animals due to the negative effect grazing has on wetland grass available to round-tailed muskrats. In addition to actively selecting habitats to which to disperse, round-tailed muskrats shift among 10–15 rest sites within their home habitat ranges. They live slightly above water level in their wetland habitats. Their shelter consists of lodges, located on a layer of dense vegetation, that have been woven out of plant material, and they feed on feeding platforms located above water level. Round-tailed muskrats have been described to be social mammals, but they may live in colonies only when a shortage of suitable habitat occurs.
