= Deserts and xeric shrublands =

Biome with under 250 mm of annual rainfall

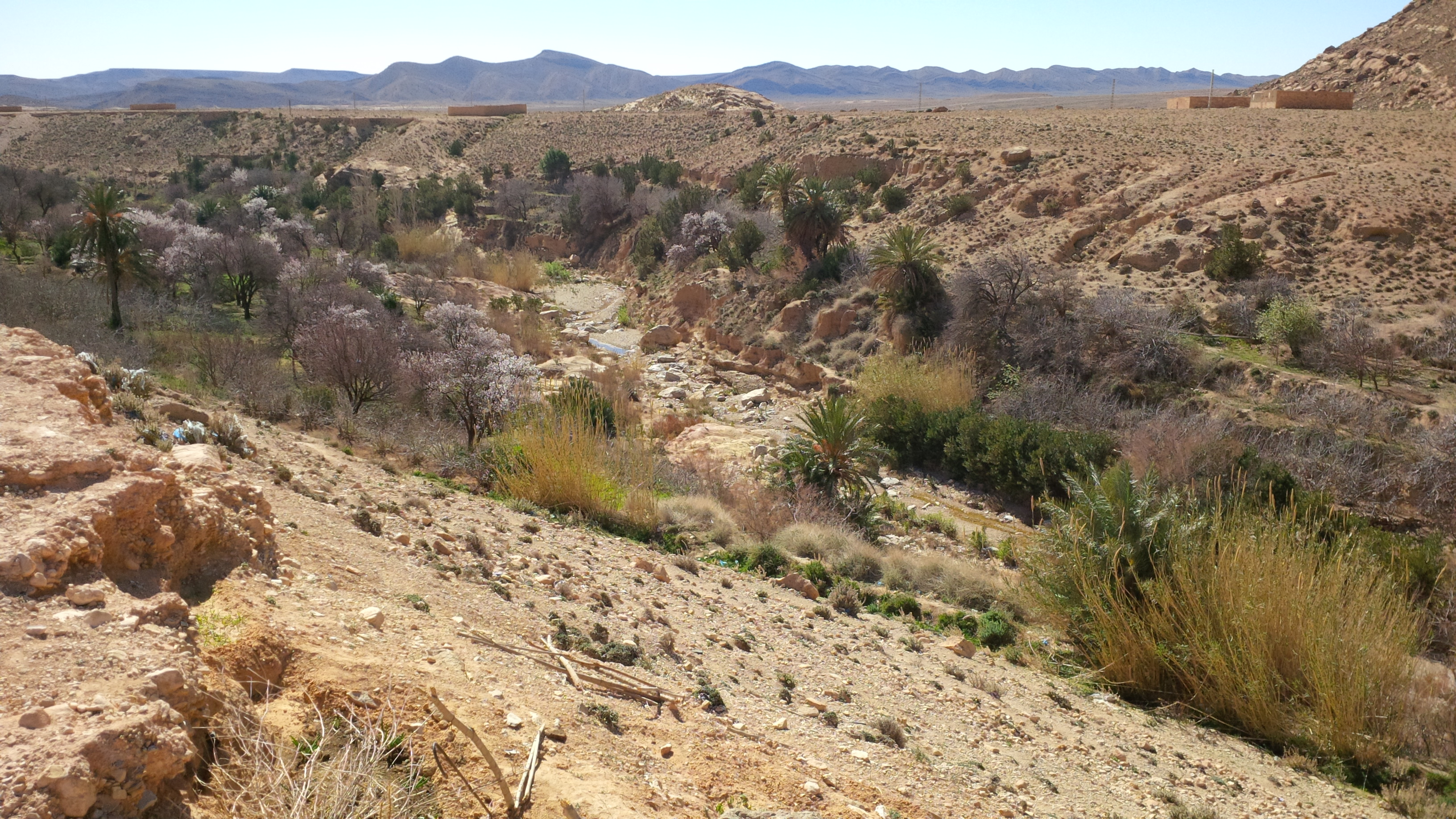
Desertic region at the M'Sila Province, Algeria

Extent of deserts and xeric shrublands

Deserts and xeric shrublands are a biome defined by the World Wide Fund for Nature. Deserts and xeric (Ancient Greek ξηρός xērós 'dry') shrublands form the largest terrestrial biome, covering 19% of Earth's land surface area. Ecoregions in this habitat type vary greatly in the amount of annual rainfall they receive, usually less than 250 millimetres (10 in) annually except in the margins. Generally evaporation exceeds rainfall in these ecoregions. Temperature variability is also diverse in these lands. Many deserts, such as the Sahara, are hot year-round, but others, such as East Asia's Gobi Desert, become quite cold during the winter.

Temperature extremes are a characteristic of most deserts. High daytime temperatures give way to cold nights because there is no insulation provided by humidity and cloud cover. The diversity of climatic conditions, though quite harsh, supports a rich array of habitats. Many of these habitats are ephemeral in nature, reflecting the paucity and seasonality of available water. Woody-stemmed shrubs and plants characterize vegetation in these regions. Above all, these plants have evolved to minimize water loss. Animal biodiversity is equally well adapted and quite diverse.

== Degradation ==
=== Desertification ===
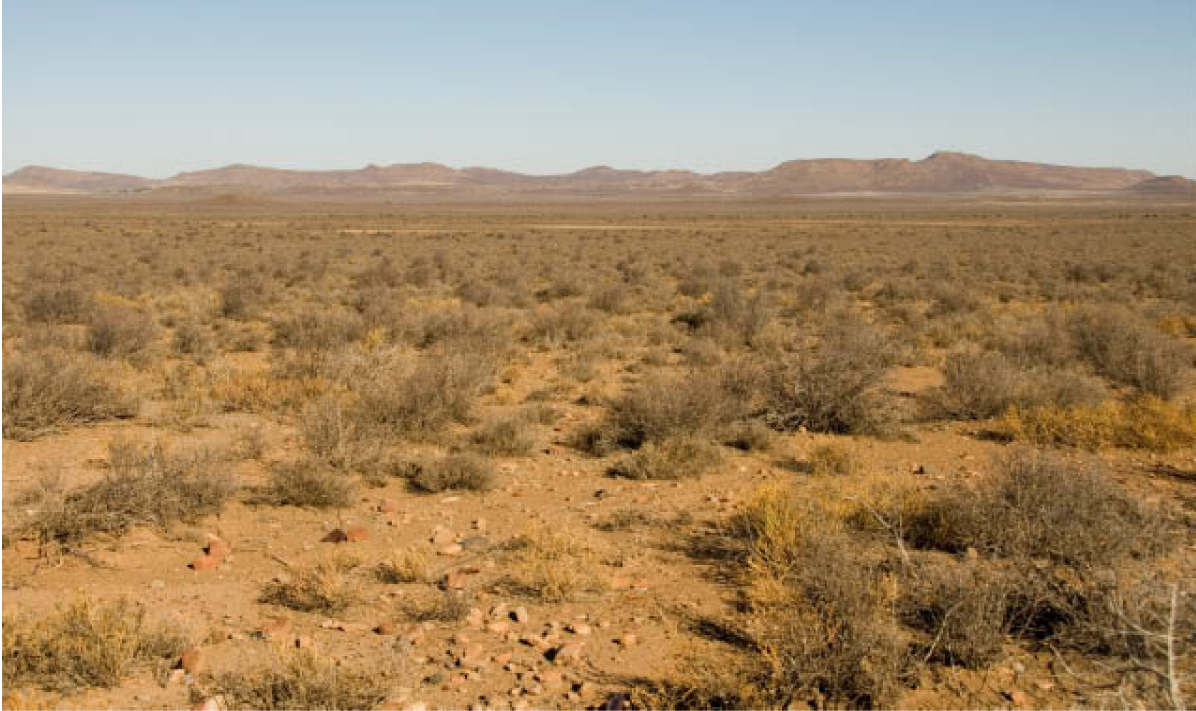
The Nama Karoo in South Africa is a xeric shrubland that receives between 100 and 500 millimetres (4 and 20 in) of rain a year.

The conversion of productive drylands to desert conditions, known as desertification, can occur from a variety of causes. One is human intervention, including intensive agricultural tillage or overgrazing in areas that cannot support such exploitation. Climatic shifts such as global warming or the Milankovitch cycle (which drives glacials and interglacials) also affect the pattern of deserts on Earth.

=== Woody plant encroachment ===
Xeric shrublands can experience woody plant encroachment, which is the thickening of bushes and shrubs at the expense of grasses. This process is often caused by unsustainable land management practices, such as overgrazing and fire suppression, but can also be a consequence of climate change. As a result, the shrublands' core ecosystem services are affected, including its biodiversity, productivity, and groundwater recharge. Woody plant encroachment can be an expression of land degradation.

== Ecoregions ==
The World Wide Fund for Nature highlights a number of desert ecoregions that have a high degree of biodiversity and endemism:

- The Nama Karoo of Namibia has the world's richest desert fauna.
- The Carnarvon xeric shrublands of Australia are a regional center for endemism.
- The Chihuahuan desert may be the most biodiverse desert ecoregion in the world.
- The Sonoran and Baja deserts of Mexico and the United States are unusual desert communities dominated by giant columnar cacti.
- Madagascar spiny forests
- Atacama Desert

== See also ==
- Hydric soil – Soil saturated by water
- Mesic – Habitat with moderate moisture
- Rain shadow – Leeward side of a mountain range
- Sagebrush steppe – Grassland ecosystem
- Shrub-steppe – Arid grassland
- Temperate grasslands, savannas, and shrublands – Terrestrial biome
- Xeriscaping — gardening or landscaping in xeric environments
- Xerocoles — animals adapted to xeric environments
- Xerophytes — plants adapted to xeric environments
