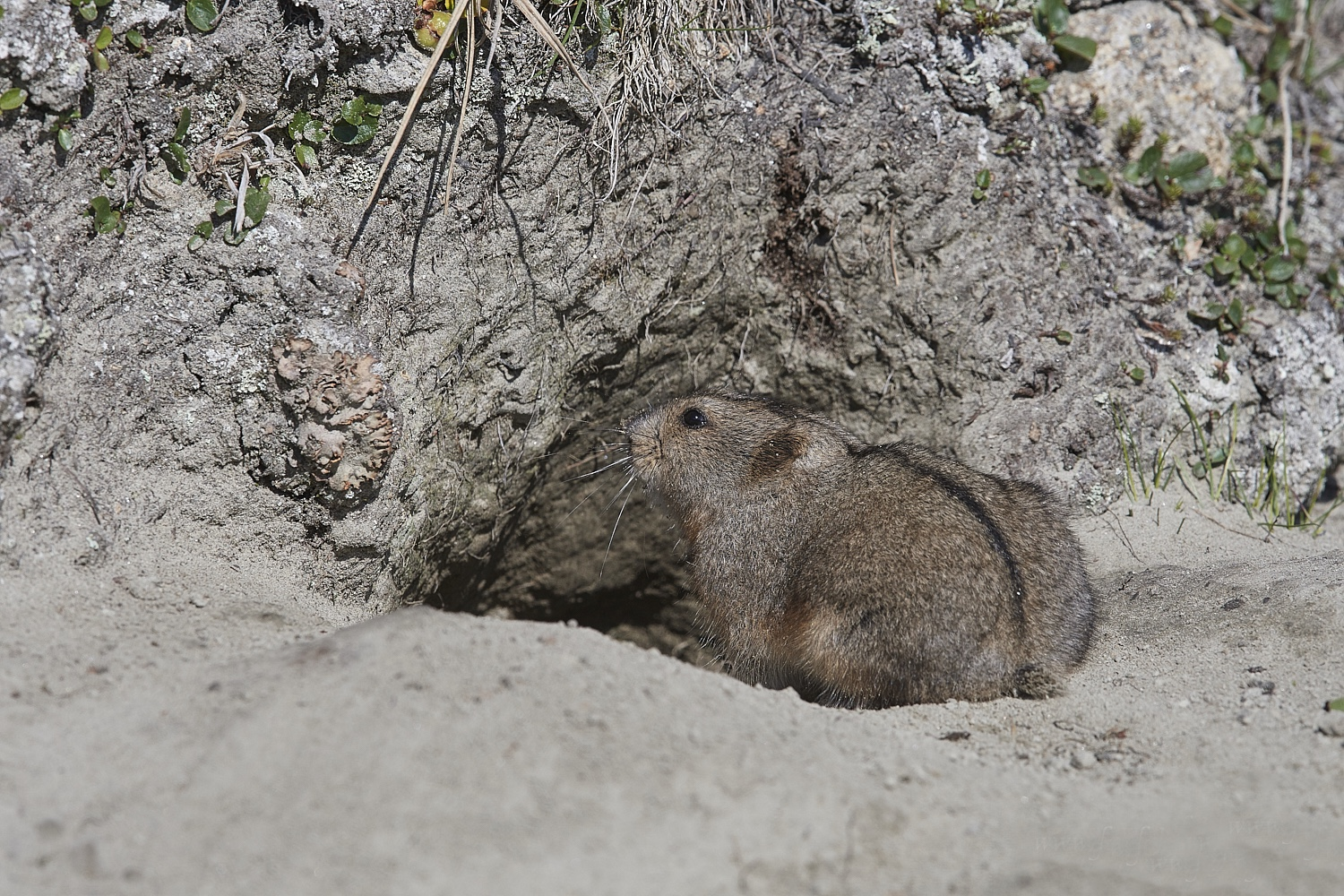

Conservation status
- Least Concern (IUCN 3.1)

Scientific classification
- Kingdom: Animalia
- Phylum: Chordata
- Class: Mammalia
- Infraclass: Placentalia
- Order: Rodentia
- Family: Cricetidae
- Subfamily: Arvicolinae
- Genus: Dicrostonyx
- Species: D. hudsonius

Binomial name
- Dicrostonyx hudsonius (Pallas, 1778)
- Distribution map of the Ungava collared lemming

= Ungava collared lemming =

Species of rodent

The Ungava collared lemming or Labrador collared lemming (Dicrostonyx hudsonius) is a small North American lemming.

== Appearance ==
This species has a short, chunky body covered with brownish-grey fur, with a thin dark stripe along the back and a yellow line along its sides. It has small ears, short legs and a very short tail, and a reddish collar across its chest and a reddish patch behind its ears. In winter, it is covered with white fur, and develops enlarged digging claws on its front feet. They average 14 cm long with a 1.5 cm tail, and weigh about 60 g.

== Habitat ==
These animals are found in the tundra of northern Quebec and Labrador. They feed on grasses, sedges and other green vegetation in summer, and twigs of willow, aspen, and birches in winter. Predators include snowy owls, mustelids, and Arctic foxes.

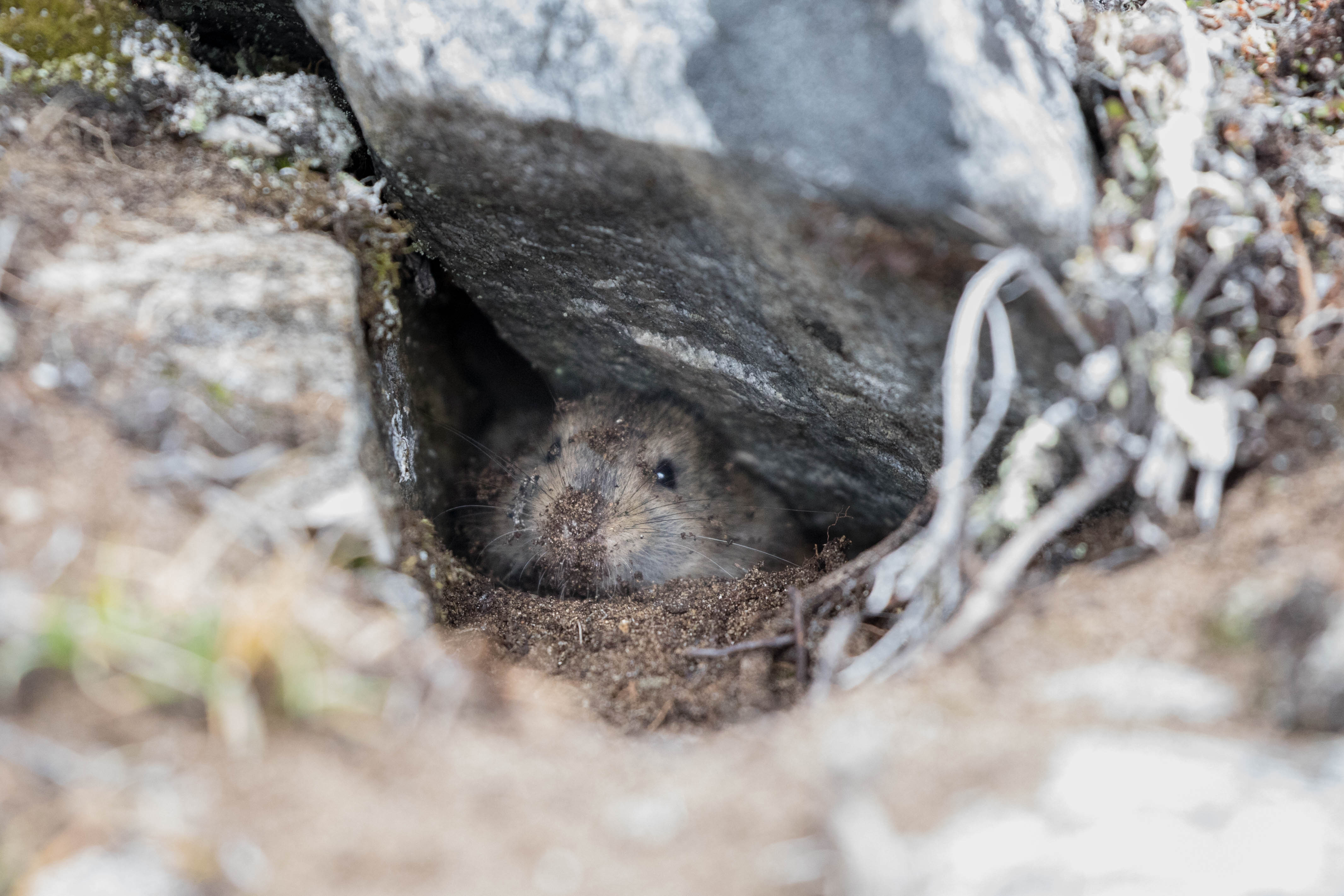
A lemming under a rock, near Quaqtaq, Canada.

Females have two or three litters of four to eight young in a year. The young are born in a nest in a burrow or concealed in vegetation.

== Activity ==
They are active year-round, day and night. They make runways through the surface vegetation and also dig burrows above the permafrost. They burrow under the snow in winter. Lemming populations go through a three- or four-year cycle of boom and bust.

When their population peaks, lemmings disperse from overcrowded areas.

== Fossils ==
Remains of these animals dating back to the end of the last ice age have been discovered in the Ottawa valley, far south of their current range.
