= Ogilvie Mountains collared lemming =

Conservation status
- Least Concern (IUCN 3.1)

Scientific classification
- Kingdom: Animalia
- Phylum: Chordata
- Class: Mammalia
- Order: Rodentia
- Family: Cricetidae
- Subfamily: Arvicolinae
- Genus: Dicrostonyx
- Species: D. nunatakensis

Binomial name
- Dicrostonyx nunatakensis Youngman, 1967
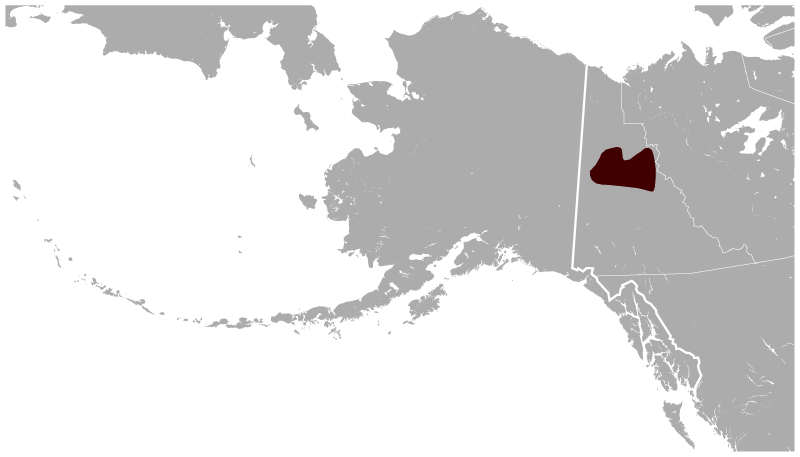
- Ogilvie Mountains collared lemming range

Species of rodent

The Ogilvie Mountains collared lemming (Dicrostonyx nunatakensis) is a species of rodent in the family Cricetidae. It is found only in Yukon Territory, Canada. Its natural habitat is tundra.
