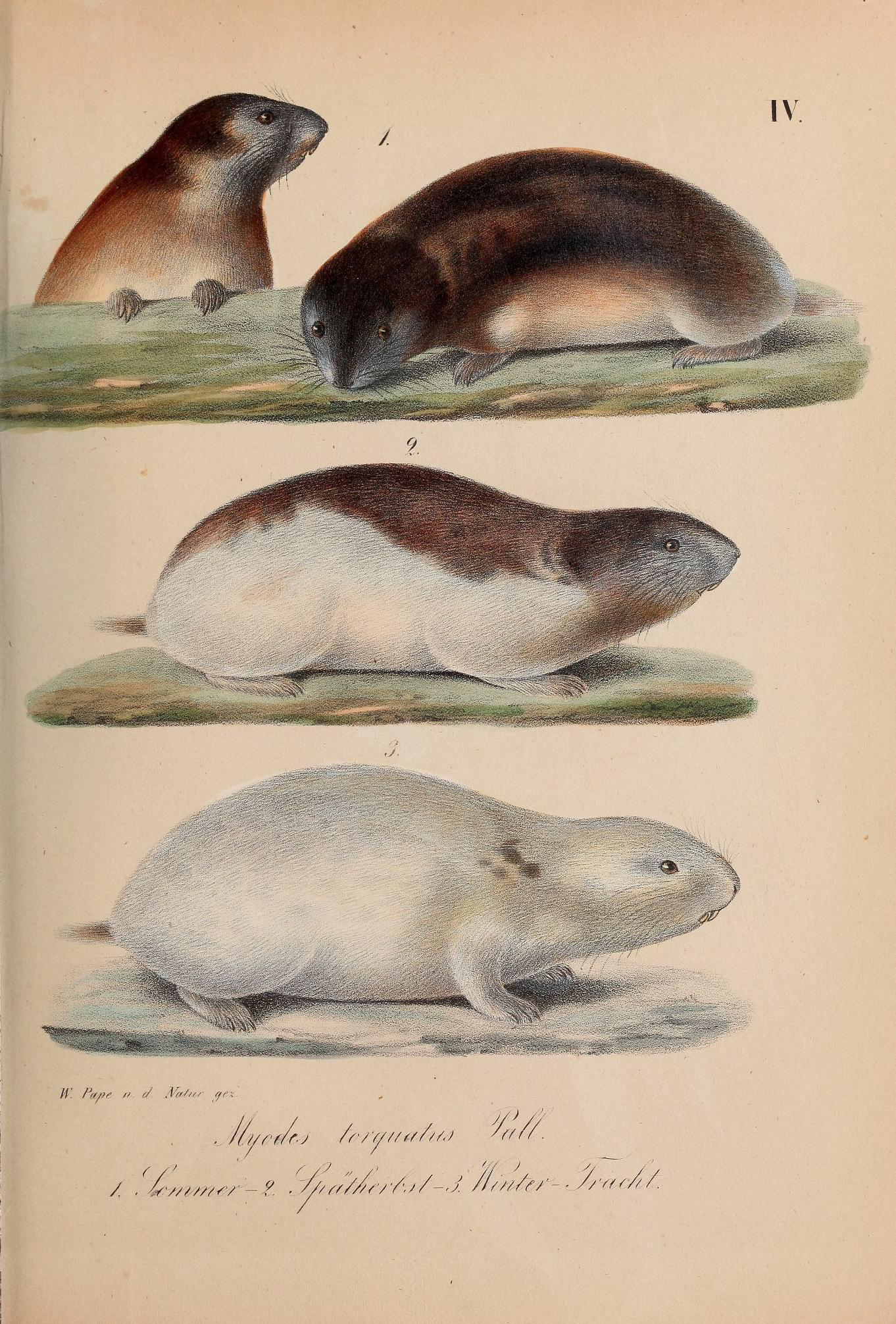

Scientific classification
- Kingdom: Animalia
- Phylum: Chordata
- Class: Mammalia
- Order: Rodentia
- Family: Cricetidae
- Subfamily: Arvicolinae
- Tribe: Dicrostonychini
- Genus: Dicrostonyx; Gloger, 1841

Type species
- Mus hudsonius Pallas, 1778

Species
- Dicrostonyx groenlandicus Dicrostonyx hudsonius Dicrostonyx nelsoni Dicrostonyx nunatakensis Dicrostonyx richardsoni Dicrostonyx torquatus Dicrostonyx unalascensis

= Collared lemming =

Collared lemmings Temporal range: Early Pleistocene to Recent

Genus of rodents

Dicrostonyx is a genus of rodent in the family Cricetidae. Its members are known as collared lemmings or varying lemmings. The genus is restricted to high latitudes in the northern hemisphere; one species, the Arctic lemming, has a broad distribution in northern Russia, while the rest are mostly or entirely North American in distribution. They are the only rodents that turn completely white in winter.

Dicrostonyx contains the following species:

- Northern collared lemming (Dicrostonyx groenlandicus)
- Ungava collared lemming (Dicrostonyx hudsonius)
- Nelson's collared lemming (Dicrostonyx nelsoni)
- Ogilvie Mountains collared lemming (Dicrostonyx nunatakensis)
- Richardson's collared lemming (Dicrostonyx richardsoni)
- Arctic lemming (Dicrostonyx torquatus)
- Unalaska collared lemming (Dicrostonyx unalascensis)
