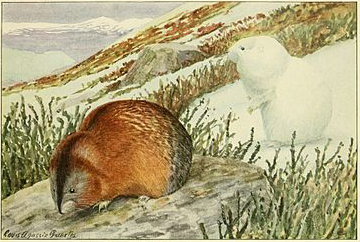

Conservation status
- Least Concern (IUCN 3.1)

Scientific classification
- Kingdom: Animalia
- Phylum: Chordata
- Class: Mammalia
- Infraclass: Placentalia
- Order: Rodentia
- Family: Cricetidae
- Subfamily: Arvicolinae
- Genus: Dicrostonyx
- Species: D. nelsoni

Binomial name
- Dicrostonyx nelsoni Merriam, 1900
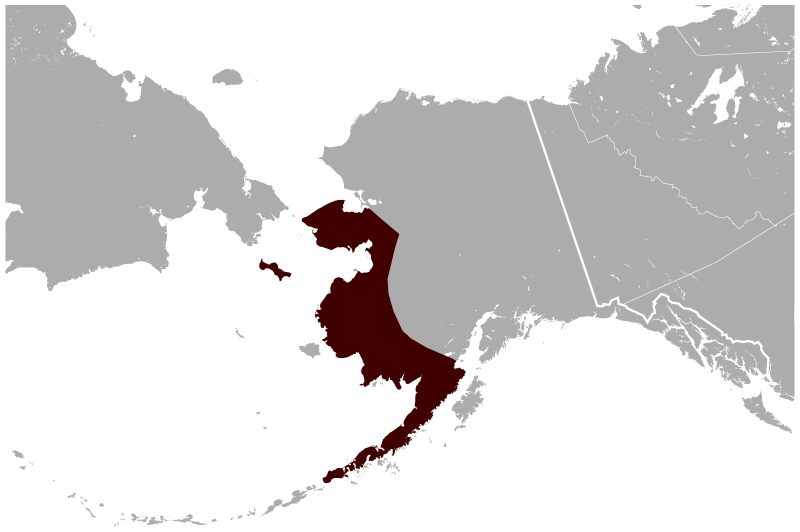
- Nelson's collared lemming range

Synonyms
- Dicrostonyx exsul

= Nelson's collared lemming =

Species of rodent

Nelson's collared lemming (Dicrostonyx nelsoni) is a species of rodent in the family Cricetidae.

== Habitat ==
It is found in western and southwestern Alaska in the United States.
