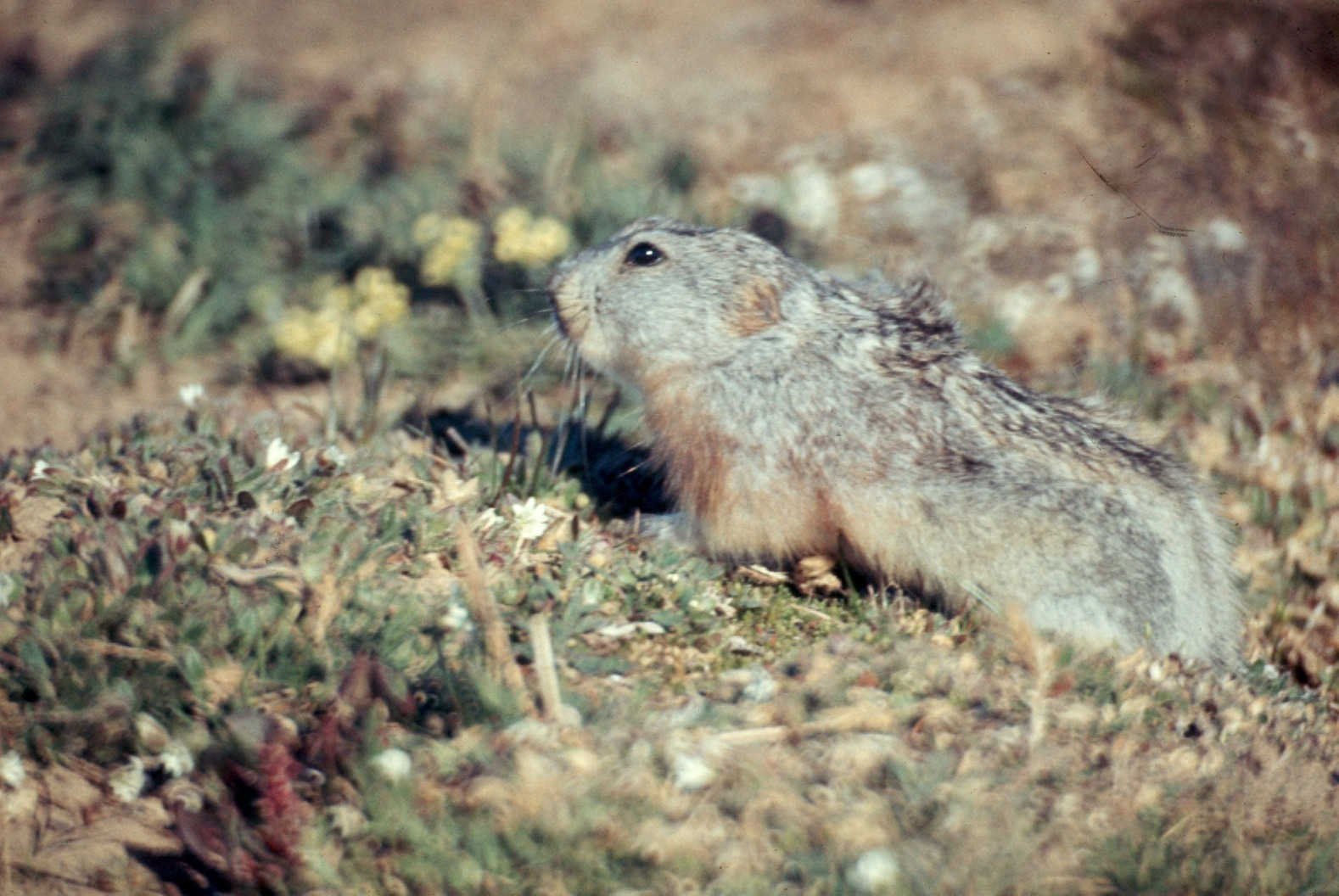

Conservation status
- Least Concern (IUCN 3.1)

Scientific classification
- Kingdom: Animalia
- Phylum: Chordata
- Class: Mammalia
- Infraclass: Placentalia
- Order: Rodentia
- Family: Cricetidae
- Subfamily: Arvicolinae
- Genus: Dicrostonyx
- Species: D. groenlandicus

Binomial name
- Dicrostonyx groenlandicus (Traill, 1823)
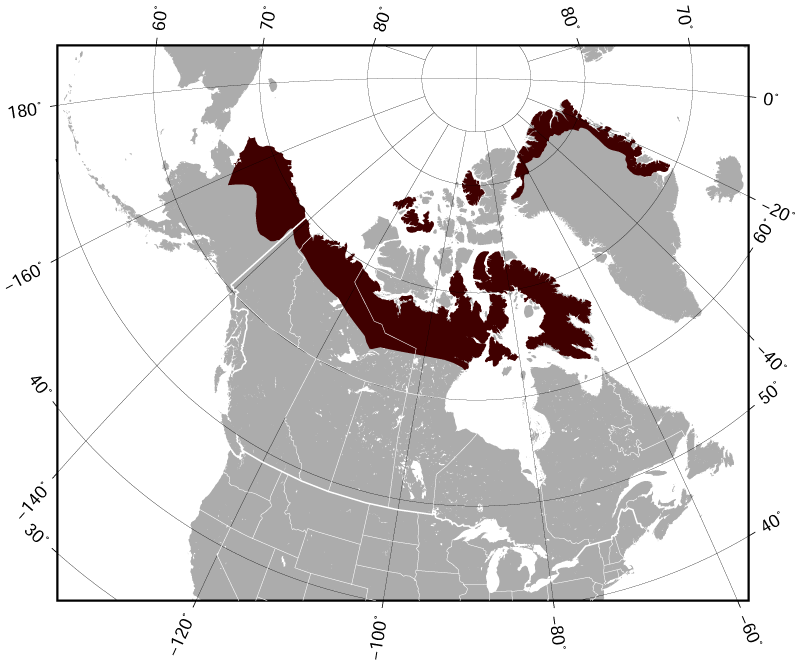
- Northern collared lemming range (not including the Wrangel lemming)

Synonyms
- kilangmiutak Anderson & Rand, 1945 rubricatus (Richardson, 1889) vinogradovi Ognev, 1948

= Northern collared lemming =

Species of rodent

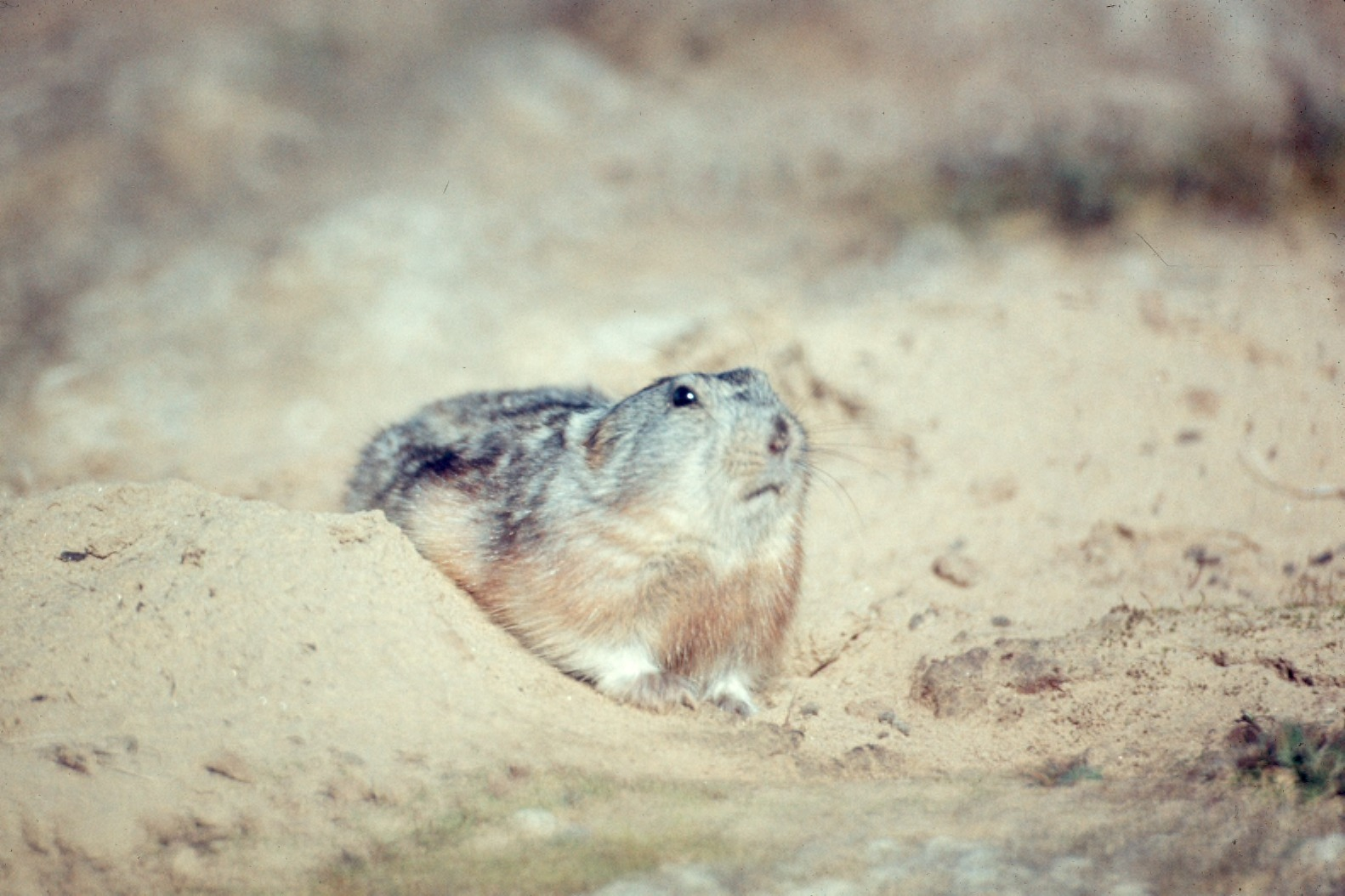
Collared lemming lying on ground

The northern collared lemming or Nearctic collared lemming (Dicrostonyx groenlandicus), sometimes called the Peary Land collared lemming in Canada, is a small lemming found in Arctic North America and Wrangel Island. At one time, it was considered to be a subspecies of the Arctic lemming (Dicrostonyx torquatus). Some sources believe several other species of collared lemmings found in North America are actually subspecies of D. groenlandicus.

== Description ==
It has a short chunky body covered with thick grey fur with a thin black stripe along its back and light grey underparts. It has small ears, short legs and a very short tail. It has a pale brown collar across its chest. In winter, its fur turns white, and it has large digging claws on its front feet. It is 14 cm (5.5 in) long with a 1.5 cm (0.59 in) tail and weighs about 40 g (1 oz).

== Distribution and habitat ==
It is found in the tundra of northern Canada, Alaska and Greenland. A disjunct population is also present on Wrangel Island in Siberia; this population was formerly considered its own species, the Wrangel lemming (D. vinogradovi).

== Diet ==
It feeds on grasses, sedges and other green vegetation in summer, and twigs of willow, aspen and birches in winter.

== Predators ==
Predators include snowy owls, gulls, wolverines, the Arctic fox and the polar bear.

== Breeding ==
Female lemmings have two or three litters of four to eight young in a year. The young are born in a nest in a burrow or concealed in vegetation.

== Behaviour ==
It is active year-round, day and night. It makes runways through the surface vegetation and also digs burrows above the permafrost. It burrows under the snow in winter. Lemming populations go through a three- or four-year cycle of boom and bust. When their population peaks, lemmings disperse from overcrowded areas.
