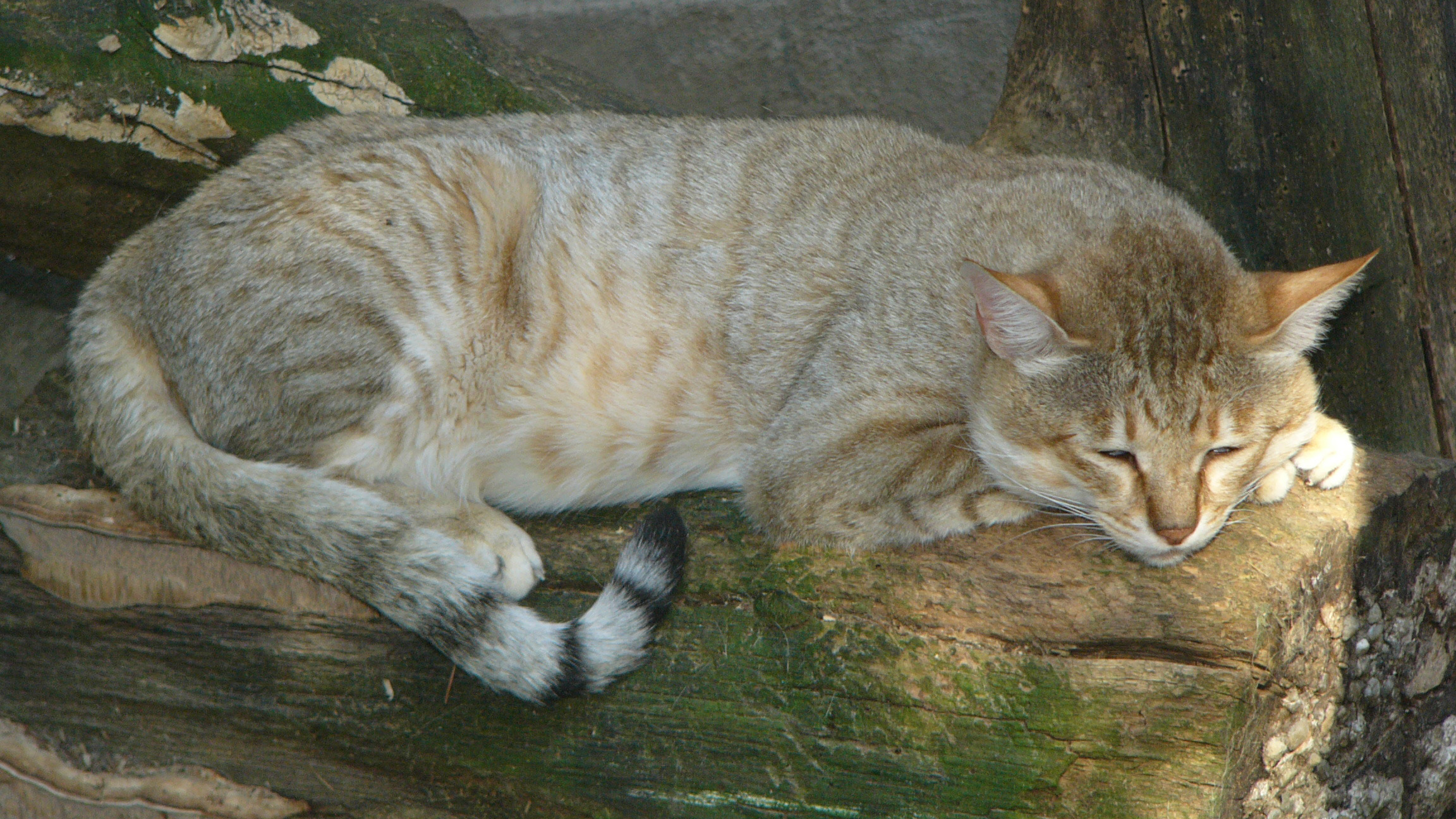
- Arabian wildcat at Olomouc Zoo

Scientific classification
- Kingdom: Animalia
- Phylum: Chordata
- Class: Mammalia
- Order: Carnivora
- Family: Felidae
- Genus: Felis
- Species: F. lybica
- Subspecies: F. l. lybica

Trinomial name
- Felis lybica lybica Forster, 1780

= Arabian wildcat =

Subspecies of carnivore

The Arabian wildcat (Felis lybica lybica), also called Gordon's wildcat, is an African wildcat subspecies that inhabits the Arabian Peninsula.

== Taxonomy ==
Felis silvestris gordoni was the scientific name proposed by David Harrison in 1968 for a wildcat collected in Oman's Al Batinah Region. Discovered and named by Sandy Gordon, hence the name Gordon’s wild-cat. The Arabian wildcat's taxonomic status has been debated since the 1990s:

- In the 2005 edition of Mammal Species of the World, it was recognised as a Felis silvestris subspecies.
- In 2007, following phylogenetic research, it was subsumed to F. s. lybica, the Near Eastern wildcat.
- Since 2017, Felis lybica is recognised as a wildcat species distinct from Felis silvestris, and the Arabian wildcat is now recognised as the nominate subspecies Felis lybica lybica.

== Characteristics ==
The Arabian wildcat is quite similar to a domestic cat in size and appearance. Its fur is short and dense, greyish-brown, ash grey or buff, with dark markings on the head and dark banding on the body, limbs and near the tip of the tail. The underparts are whitish, and there are black hairs between the black pads on the soles of the feet.

== Distribution and habitat ==
This cat is endemic to northern Oman and parts of the United Arab Emirates. Its typical habitat is semidesert areas with rock and scrub where males maintain a territory which may measure several square km, and females a rather smaller territory.

== Behaviour and ecology ==
The Arabian wildcat is nocturnal; it is a solitary and has several dens, rock crevices, hollow trees or empty fox burrows, into which it can retreat in different parts of its territory. It feeds on jerboas, jirds and other small rodents, small birds, reptiles and large insects, obtaining most of its fluid needs from its food. It is fierce and agile. Breeding takes place at most times of year. The male is drawn to the female by the pheromones she produces when she is sexually receptive. The gestation period is about 65 days, and the litter size is usually three or four kittens. The young have spotted coats at first and are weaned after two or three months, but stay with their mother for several months more to learn hunting and survival skills.

== Status ==
The range of the Arabian wildcat is small and it is one of the most threatened subspecies of wildcat. Its habitat is now increasingly being degraded for agricultural purposes. The most serious threat it faces may be that it hybridises with feral domestic cats, and there may be few purebred Arabian wildcats remaining in the wild. With this in mind, a captive breeding program was started in 1986 in Abu Dhabi, and other cats have been relocated to California and Germany, with an international studbook being kept at Cologne Zoological Garden.
