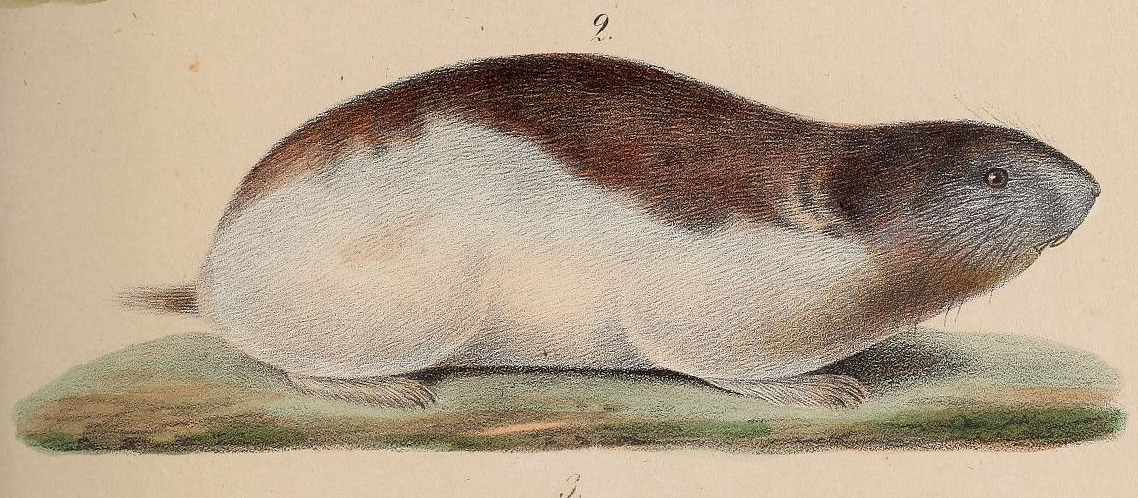

Conservation status
- Least Concern (IUCN 3.1)

Scientific classification
- Kingdom: Animalia
- Phylum: Chordata
- Class: Mammalia
- Order: Rodentia
- Family: Cricetidae
- Subfamily: Arvicolinae
- Genus: Dicrostonyx
- Species: D. torquatus

Binomial name
- Dicrostonyx torquatus (Pallas, 1778)

= Arctic lemming =

Species of rodent

The Arctic lemming (Dicrostonyx torquatus) is a species of rodent in the family Cricetidae.

Although generally classified as a "least concern" species, the Novaya Zemlya subspecies (D. t. ungulatus) is considered a vulnerable species under Russian nature conservation legislation (included in Red Book of Russian Federation since 1998).

== Biology ==
It is found only in Arctic regions of Russia, and it is the most common mammal on Severnaya Zemlya. During Late Pleistocene glacial maxima, when tundra habitats extended much farther south, this species or close relatives were widespread across Europe; Dicrostonyx fossils have been found west to England and south as far as southern France and Croatia.

For the most part, lemmings of the genus Lemmus can coexist with those of genus Dicrostonyx. Arctic lemmings migrate when population density becomes too great, and they resort to swimming in search of a new habitat. The disappearance of lemmings and the lemming cycles in the Arctic have shown that they are linked to fluctuations in local breeding among geese and waders. Recovery of lemmings after years of low density is associated with a period of successful breeding and maintenance of their young in the snow.

The diet of the Arctic lemming has been studied, and it has been found to consist of 86% dicotyledons, 14% monocotyledons, and less than 1% mosses. The diet of a family of lemmings consists mostly of Saliceae, although Poaceae are also in their diet.

They are a well studied example of a cyclic predator−prey relationship. Terns in the Arctic target lemmings that move in groups; after attacks, lemmings seek shelter in holes or elsewhere out of the terns' territory to avoid additional attacks.

== Environment ==
During the winter, Arctic lemmings make nests in order to help maintain thermoregulation, maintaining their young, and aids in their survival against predators. One of their predators is the Arctic fox and they would find that it is difficult to hunt lemmings because they would burrow themselves deep within the snow. The fox would then have to dig through the snow in order to reach them. When snow is scarce and there isn't much for the lemmings to make a nest or burrow in, there are periodic disappearances of lemmings because of hunting by other predators and their inability to protect themselves.
