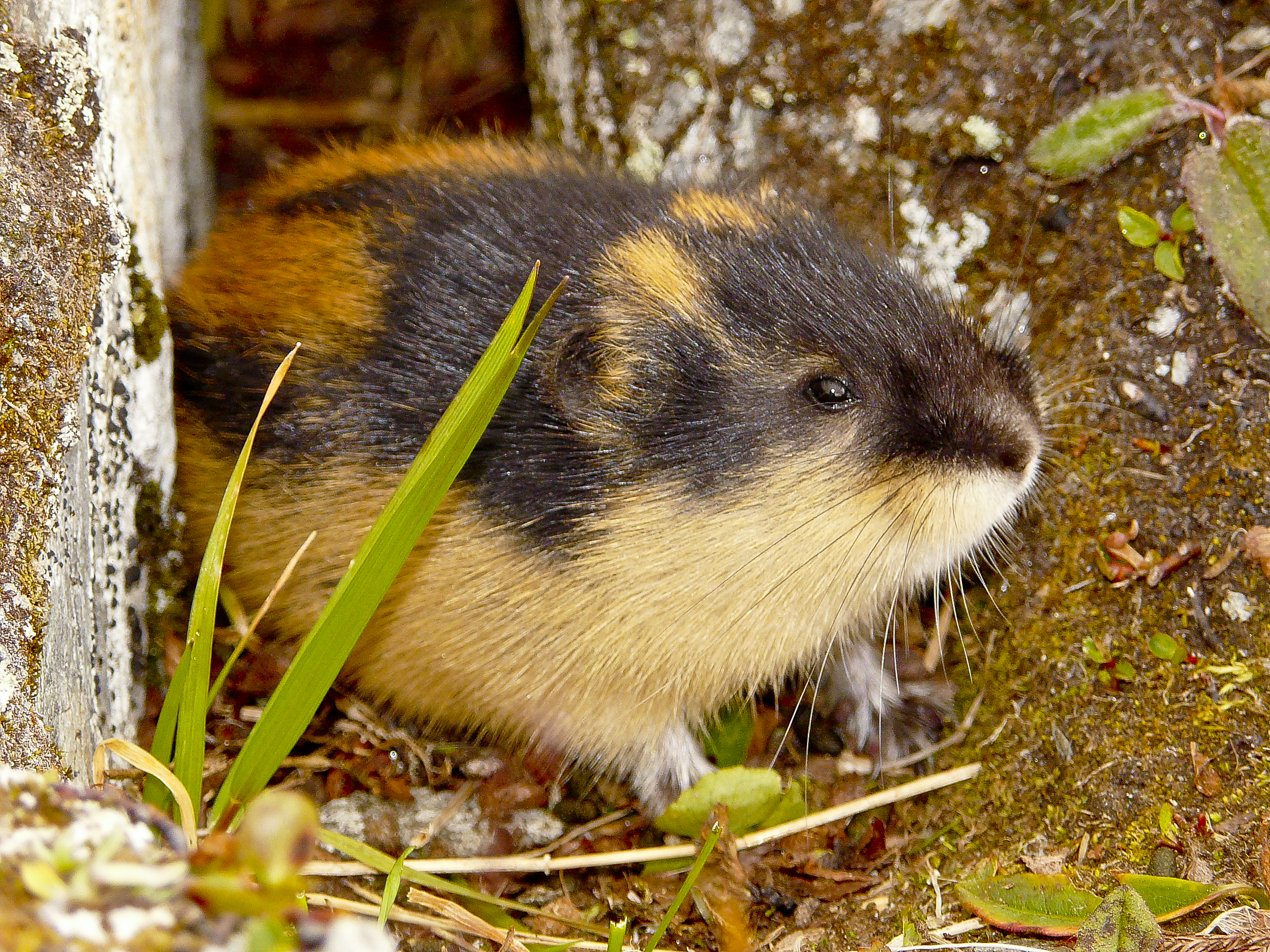
- Norway lemming (Lemmus lemmus)

Scientific classification
- Kingdom: Animalia
- Phylum: Chordata
- Class: Mammalia
- Order: Rodentia
- Family: Cricetidae
- Subfamily: Arvicolinae
- Tribe: Lemmini; Simpson, 1945

Genera
- Lemmus; Myopus; Synaptomys

Synonyms
- Synaptomyini Koenigswald and L. D. Martin, 1984

= Lemmini =

Lemmini Temporal range: Pliocene to present, 4.2–0 Ma

Tribe of lemmings

Lemmini is a tribe of lemmings in the subfamily Arvicolinae. Species in this tribe are:

Tribe Lemmini

- Genus Lemmus - true lemmings
  - Amur lemming (L. amurensis)
  - Norway lemming (L. lemmus)
  - Beringian lemming (L. nigripes)
  - East Siberian lemming (L. paulus)
  - West Siberian lemming (L. sibiricus)
  - North American brown lemming (L. trimucronatus)
- Genus Myopus - wood lemming
  - Wood lemming (M. schisticolor)
- Genus Synaptomys - bog lemmings
  - Northern bog lemming (S. borealis)
  - Southern bog lemming (S. cooperi)

The fossil taxa Mictomys, Tobienia (both thought to be allied with Synaptomys), and Plioctomys (thought to be allied with Lemmus and Myopus) are also thought to belong to this group.

A 2021 phylogenetic study using mtDNA recovered Lemmini as sister to all other lineages of Arvicolinae, diverging during the late Miocene, about 8 million years ago.
