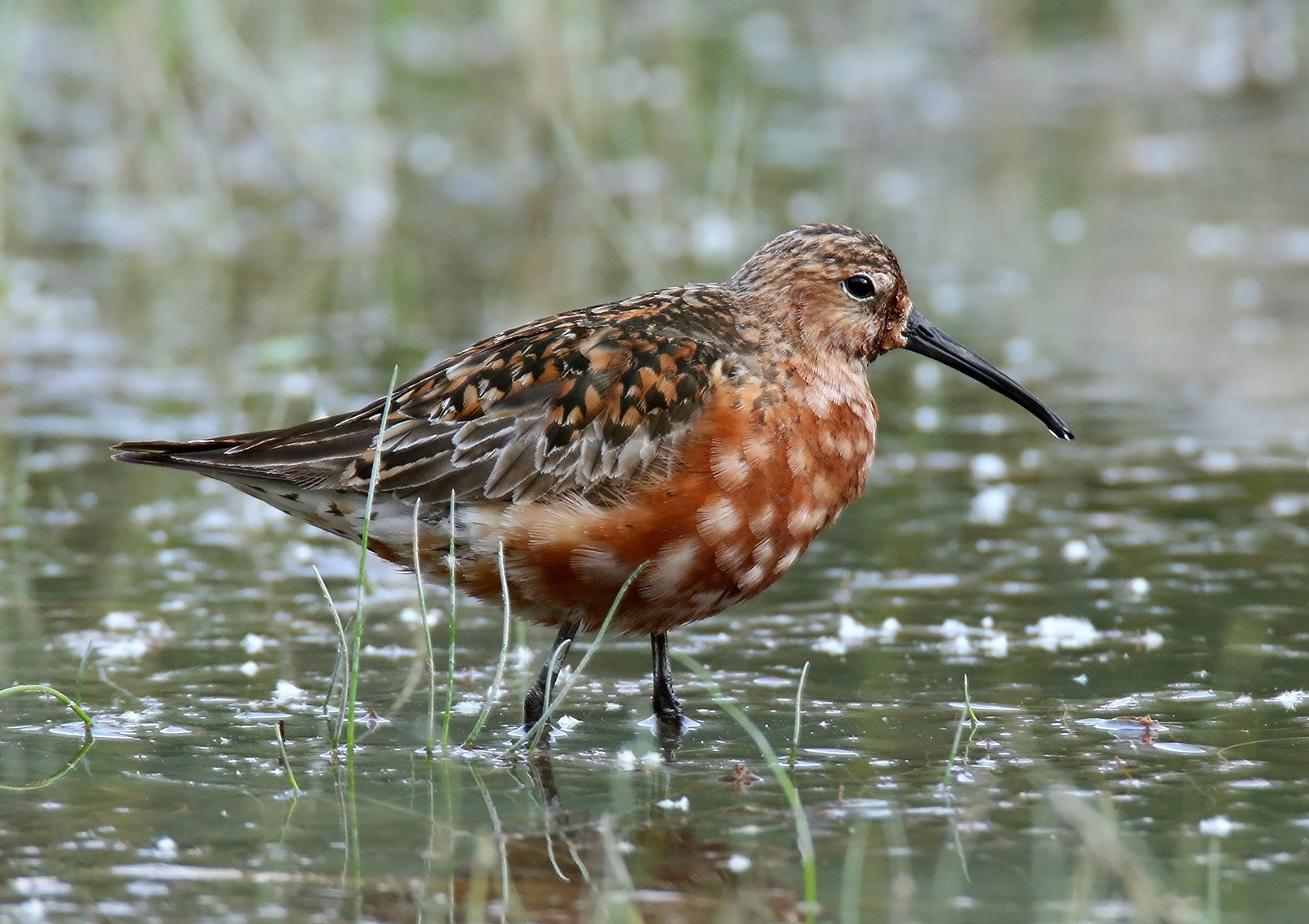
- Adult on autumn migration starting moult out of breeding plumage, Pakistan
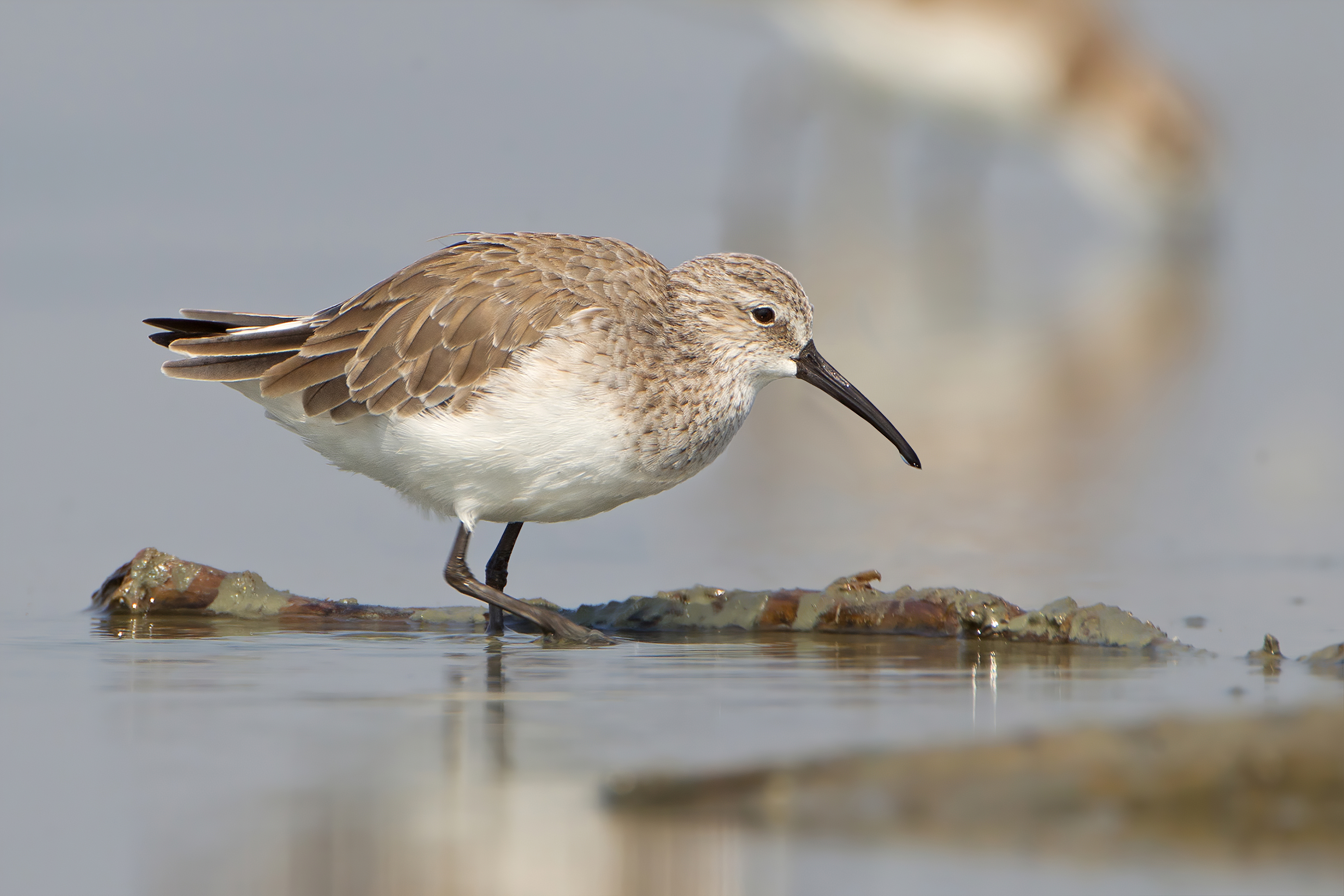
- Non-breeding plumage, Thailand

Conservation status
- Vulnerable (IUCN 3.1)

Scientific classification
- Kingdom: Animalia
- Phylum: Chordata
- Class: Aves
- Order: Charadriiformes
- Family: Scolopacidae
- Genus: Calidris
- Species: C. ferruginea

Binomial name
- Calidris ferruginea (Pontoppidan, 1763)
- Nonbreeding; Breeding; Migration

Synonyms
- Tringa ferrugineus (Pontoppidan, 1763); Scolopax testacea (Pallas, 1764); Scolopax subarquata (Güldenstädt, 1775); Erolia variegata (Vieillot, 1816); Pelidna arquata (Brehm, 1855); Tringa chinensis (Gray, 1831); Erolia ferruginea wilsoni (Mathews, 1917)

= Curlew sandpiper =

Species of bird

The curlew sandpiper (Calidris ferruginea) is a small wader. It is a long-distance migrant, breeding in the bogs and coastal lowlands of the Siberian Arctic, arriving there in June and staying until August or September. After the breeding season, it migrates south to spend the winter in Africa and along the coasts of Oceania and southern Eurasia, occupying tidal mudflats and saltpans.

It has three main plumages that change with maturity and season. The non-breeding plumage shows brown-greyish upperparts and white underparts. The breeding plumage is much more striking, with the entire front tinted a deep rusty colour, more intensely so in males. The first-year bird does not migrate or breed, instead remaining in its overwintering range throughout the breeding season. It may occasionally moult into its breeding plumage, which is largely similar to that of an adult but with white spots on the chest. The non-breeding juvenile plumage is also like that of an adult, except with creamy-coloured streaking on the breast and pale fringes on some of the wing feathers, leading to a scaly appearance. Adults superficially resemble the larger but shorter-billed red knot and the red phalarope in breeding plumage, and the dunlin and stilt sandpiper while not breeding. Juveniles may be confused with the larger and yellow-legged juvenile ruff, or the juvenile dunlin, which has a streaked chest.

The curlew sandpiper's courtship behaviour is complex and involves several distinct displays. In one, the male constructs a faux nest on the ground to present to the female. Another is a graceful aerial chase accompanied by frequent warbling calls. In a third, the male dances around the female on the ground, displaying his tail feathers and rump; this display sometimes culminates in copulation. The female almost always lays one clutch of eggs, usually around the end of June, which hatch after 20 days and fully fledge at 14–20 days. Chicks are relatively mature and mobile at birth. The curlew sandpiper's breeding success is linked to the lemming population; in years with many lemmings, its predators hunt them instead. It is omnivorous, foraging in large flocks in wetlands for various invertebrates, including crabs and insects.

The curlew sandpiper is listed as a vulnerable species on the IUCN Red List because land development and the invasive smooth cordgrass have caused significant habitat loss to its overwintering and migratory sites, and climate change has lowered its breeding productivity. The curlew sandpiper has an estimated annual survival rate of 75–80%.

== Taxonomy and etymology ==
The curlew sandpiper was formally described in 1763 by the Danish ornithologist Erik Pontoppidan under the binomial name Tringa ferrugineus, later designated Tringa ferruginea by Morten Thrane Brünnich in 1764. Historically, it was often placed in the genus Tringa along with other small sandpipers; in 1816, Louis Pierre Vieillot even considered it the type species of that genus. It was later moved to the genus Calidris. The genus name is from Ancient Greek kalidris or skalidris, a term used by Aristotle for some grey waterside birds. The specific epithet ferruginea is from Latin ferrugo, ferruginis, "iron rust", referring to the bird's colour in breeding plumage. The curlew sandpiper has no recognised subspecies. Within the genus Calidris, the curlew sandpiper is most closely related to the stilt sandpiper; together, they form part of a small clade that also includes the spoon-billed sandpiper, Temminck's stint, red-necked stint, and long-toed stint. The curlew sandpiper occasionally hybridises with sharp-tailed and pectoral sandpipers, producing the hybrids Cooper's sandpiper and Cox's sandpiper, respectively. Hybrids with the dunlin and white-rumped sandpiper have also been observed, though they are rare.

== Description ==
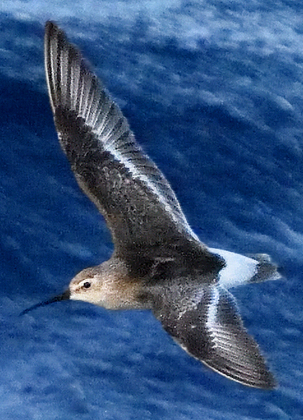
A curlew sandpiper in flight, displaying its prominent white wingstripe and rump

The curlew sandpiper is a small wader 18–23 cm in length and weighing 44–117 g. It has a wingspan of 38–46 cm, a bill length of 32–44 mm, and a tarsus (the bone between the "knee" and the "ankle" (Note: What looks like the "knee" of the bird is actually the ankle; in all birds, the knee bends backwards and is tucked inside the body. This means that the "ankle" of the bird would be the foot of the bird, and the apparent "foot" would actually be the bird's toes.)) length of 26–34 mm. It has a black bill, dark brown irises, and dark grey to black feet. All plumages have a large white patch on the rump, occasionally barred with red in some adults, and in flight show a distinctive white stripe going across the wing. Like most waders, the curlew sandpiper has seasonal plumages and moults yearly, shedding its old feathers and growing new ones. For example, to attain its breeding plumage, it will have to first complete the pre-breeding moult; to attain its non-breeding plumage, it will have to complete the post-breeding moult.

The non-breeding plumage has greyish upperparts and white underparts with some pale grey streaks; however, as feather wear increases, it slowly becomes browner. The centres of its upperpart feathers are darker, especially on the top of the head, causing its upperparts to look mottled. The tail's underside and the rump are white, with broad, pale grey tail feathers. The largest feathers on its wing are dusky with white streaks along the shaft and a white tip. It has a distinctively white eyebrow, with grey-brown feathers between the base of the bill and the eyes and around the ear. The post-breeding moult, taking place from July to November and lasting as late as April the next year in some southern populations, is a complete moult, with all feathers being replaced.

Occurring from January to May, the pre-breeding moult is partial, with all the body feathers and a few flight feathers being replaced. The plumage of a returning breeder differs by sex. In the female, the front side, the entire head, and the upper back are tinted variably reddish, with grey-to-dark streaks. The feathers above the wingstripe are tipped ruddy-silver with black centres, resulting in a spotty appearance. The upper tail, the rump, and most of the wing are all nearly identical to the non-breeding appearance, except for the central tail feathers and two to three of the innermost flight feathers, which are off-black with white or ruddy fringing. Male plumage is similar to that of the female, except with the rust-coloured tinting being almost completely opaque, and conspicuous spots above the eye and around the top of the head.

The pre-juvenile moult of the chick occurs at the nest site from late June to July. The juvenile looks similar to the adult non-breeding plumage, but the wear marks and fringing on its feathers are more evenly spread out, resulting in a scaly and more buff-tinged appearance, and the tail feathers are slimmer. The top and back of its head are both dusky with pale creamy streaks, the back being slightly paler.

The post-juvenile moult occurs from October to December (and can finish as late as April) and is a partial to incomplete moult, replacing all the body feathers and some wing feathers. This moult takes place almost entirely at stopover and overwintering sites, (Note: Overwintering sites are the areas where a species usually stays outside of migrating and breeding.) only rarely starting at breeding grounds.

The pre-breeding moult of the first-year bird, which occurs from April to June, is absent or limited; the body feathers are largely or completely replaced, but few if any wing feathers are replaced. The plumage of the first-time breeder is similar to the adult summer plumage, with the primary differences being white spots on the underparts, which are fully and opaquely rust-coloured, not tinted. Sex differences are also similar to those of returning breeders.

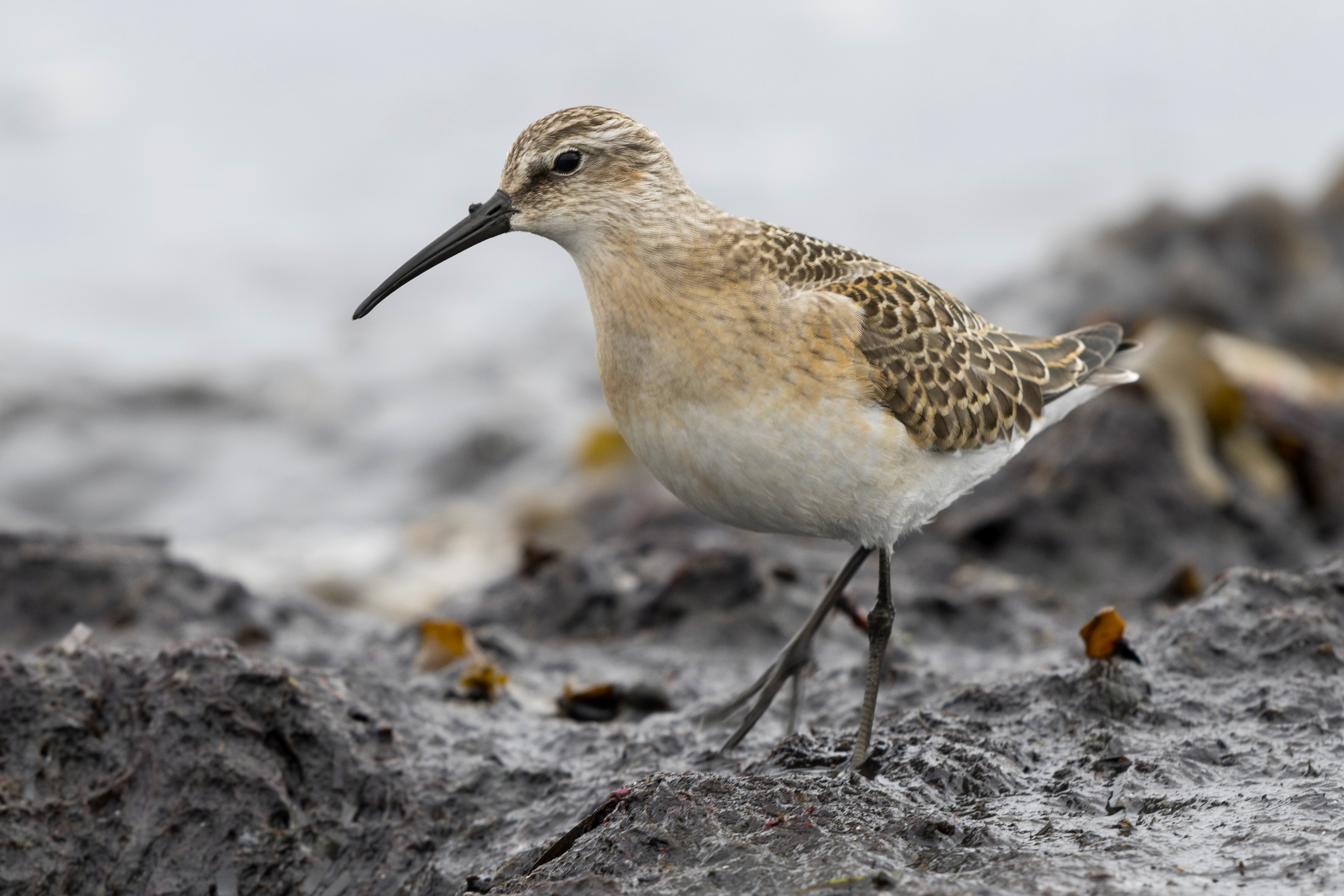
Juvenile plumage on autumn migration, Sweden

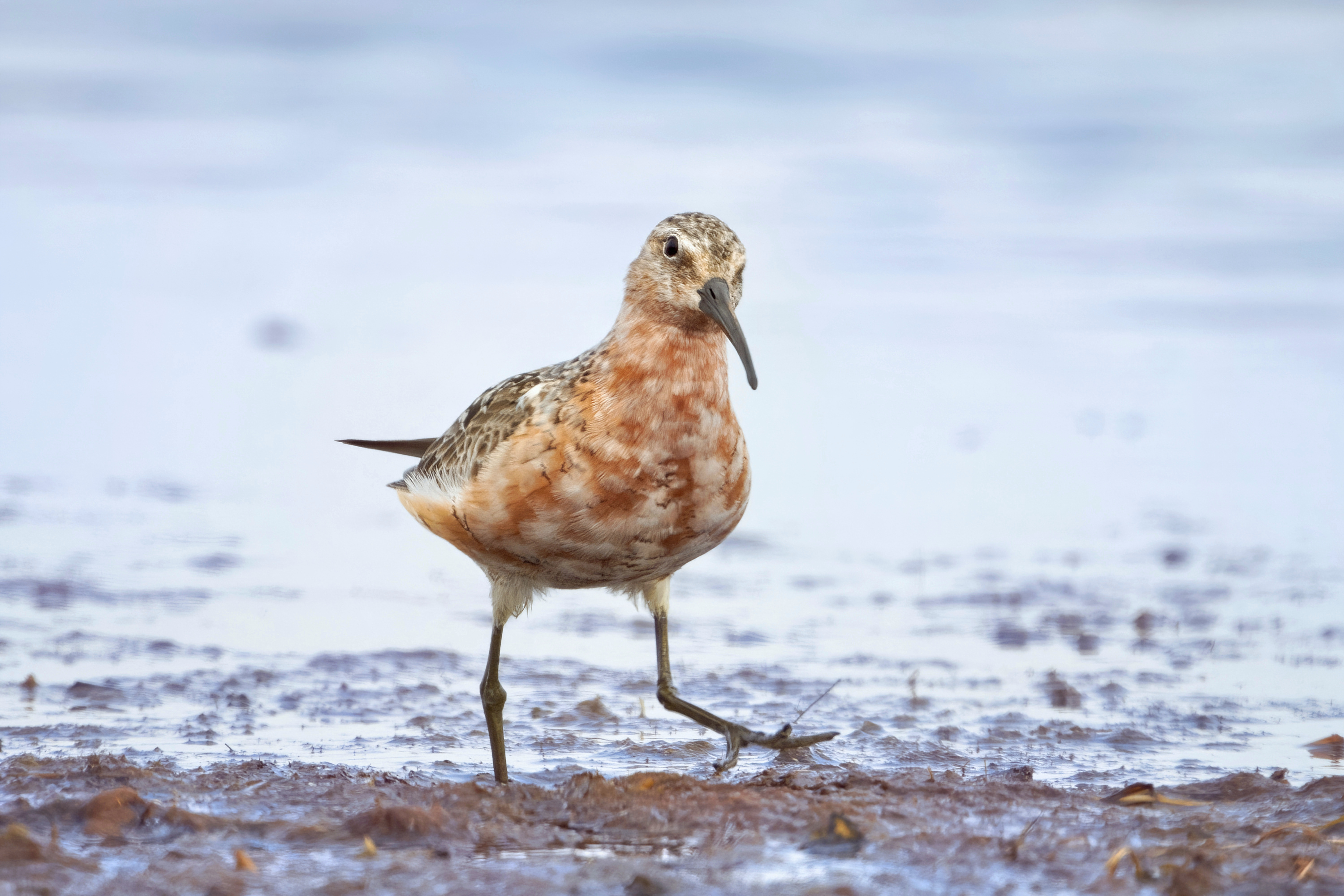
Adult moulting out of breeding plumage on autumn migration, St Petersburg, Russia

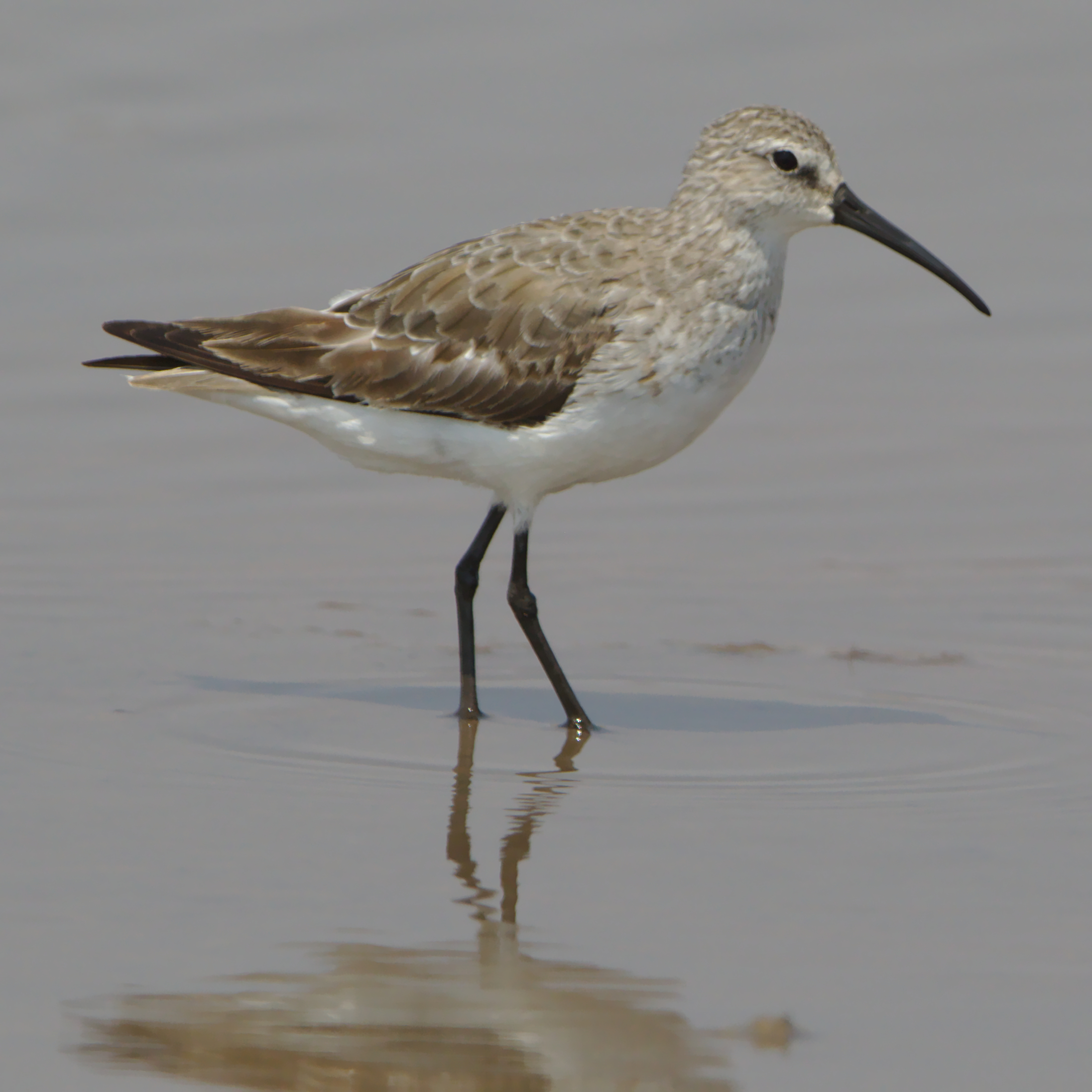
Adult in non-breeding plumage, South Africa

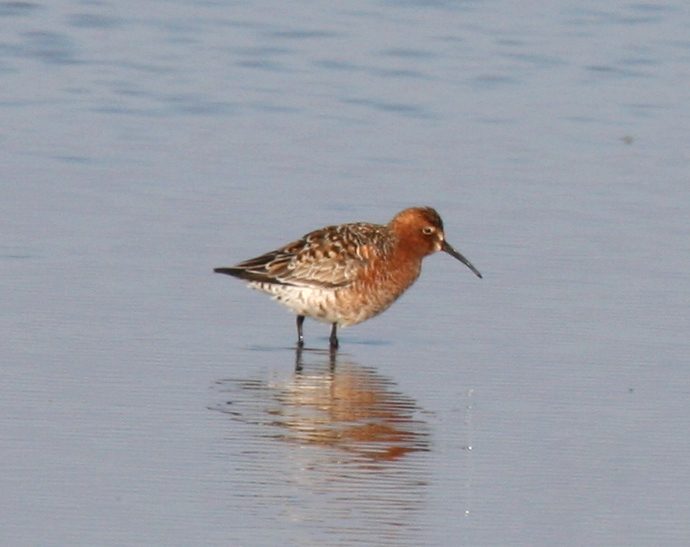
Adult in breeding plumage

=== Similar species ===
While in breeding plumage, the curlew sandpiper can be confused with the red knot, as both are reddish on the belly. Compared to the curlew sandpiper, the red knot is larger, and has paler orange-buff rather than rust-colored underparts, shorter, greenish legs, and a stockier bill, as well as a spotted and greyish rump. Compared to the red phalarope, the curlew sandpiper does not have black on the top of the head or a white patch around the face, nor does it have a straight and yellow beak or fully brick-red underparts.

Similar species while breeding

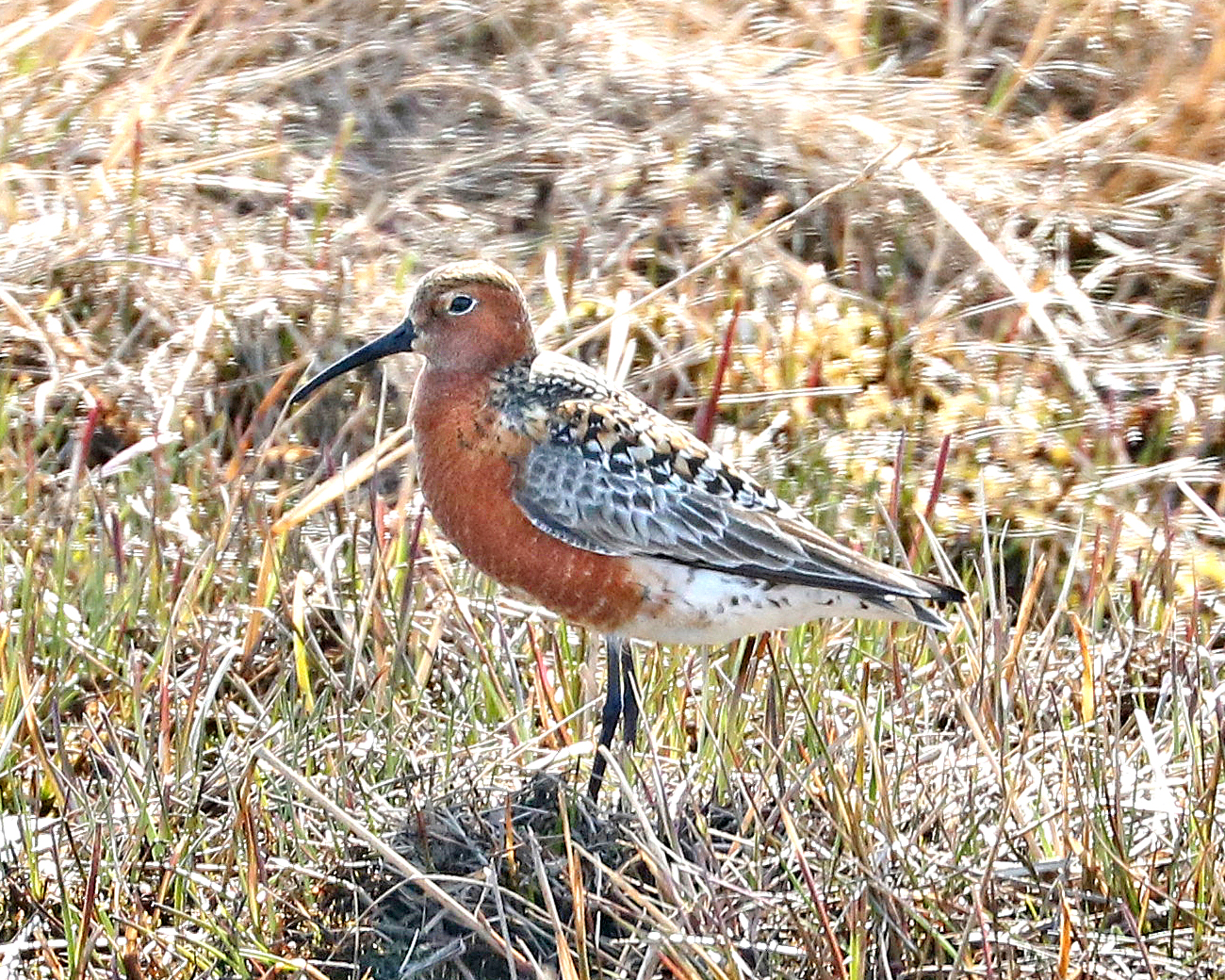
A male curlew sandpiper in full breeding plumage

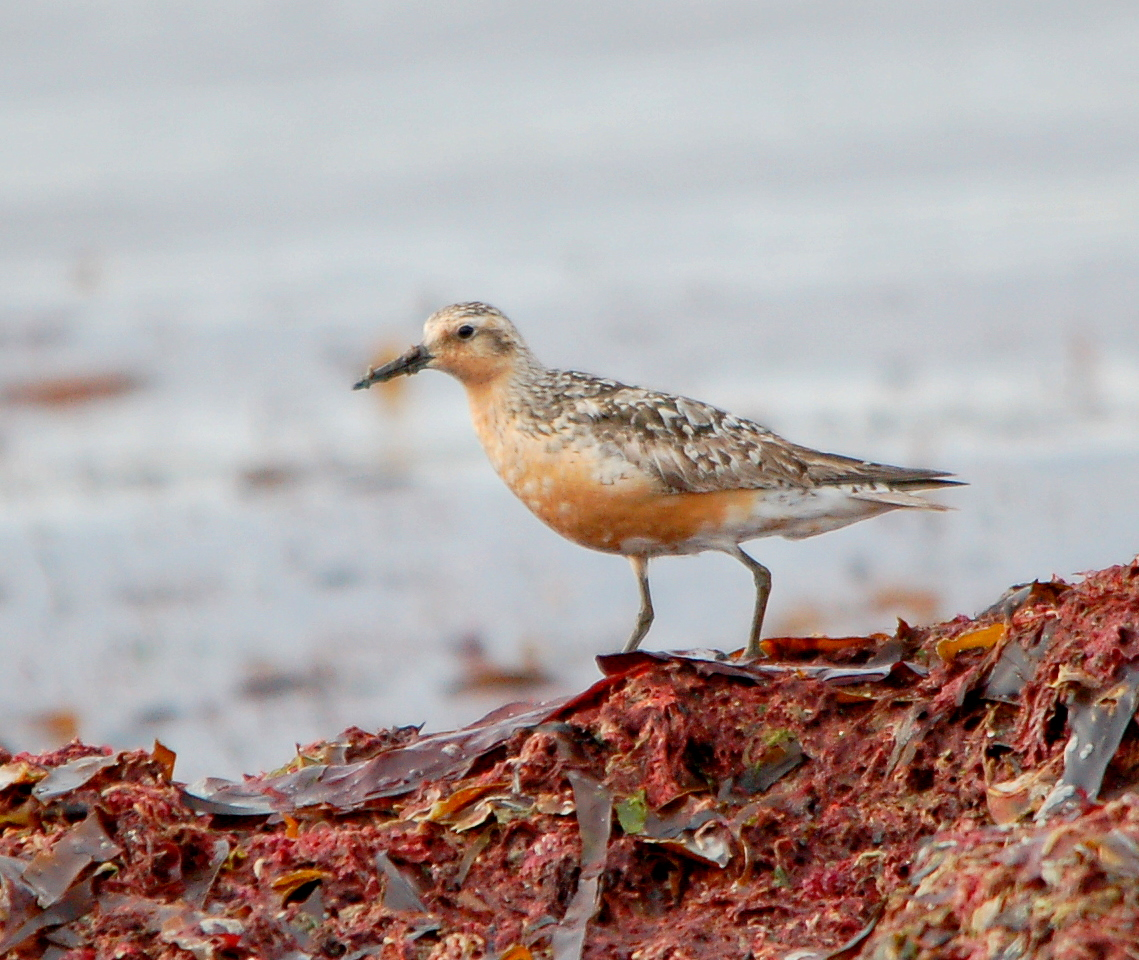
A red knot in breeding plumage. Its underparts are a paler orange-buff.

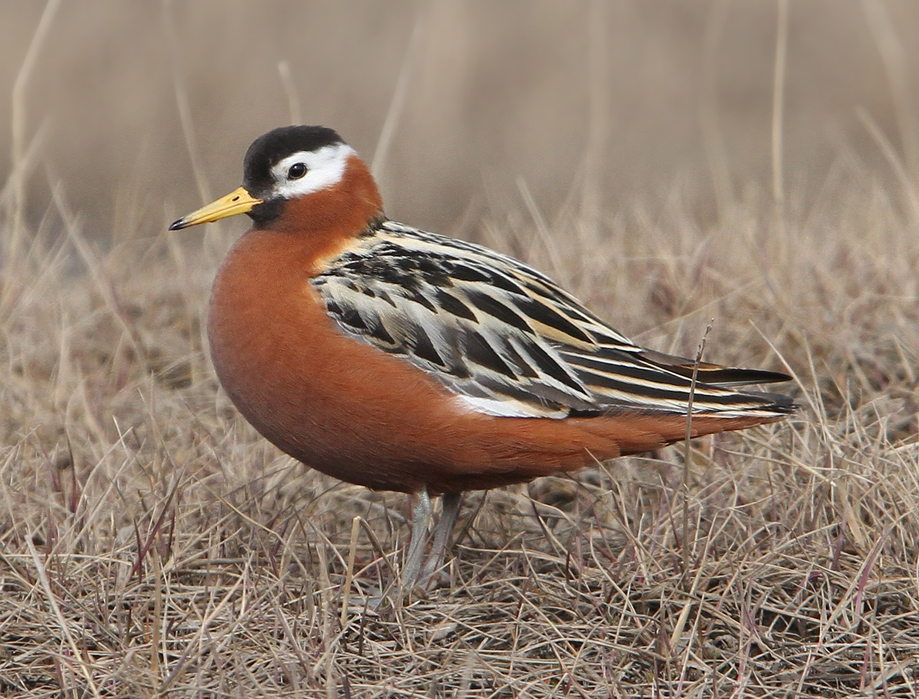
A red phalarope in breeding plumage. It has a distinctive black crown.

The non-breeding or juvenile plumage looks similar to other species of its genus Calidris, such as the stilt sandpiper, which lacks the curlew sandpiper's distinctive white wing stripe and has longer, yellow legs and a flatter head, and the dunlin, which has less visible eyebrows and a straighter bill, along with a generally stouter appearance, and wingtips that barely, if at all, extend beyond the tip of its tail.

Similar species while non-breeding

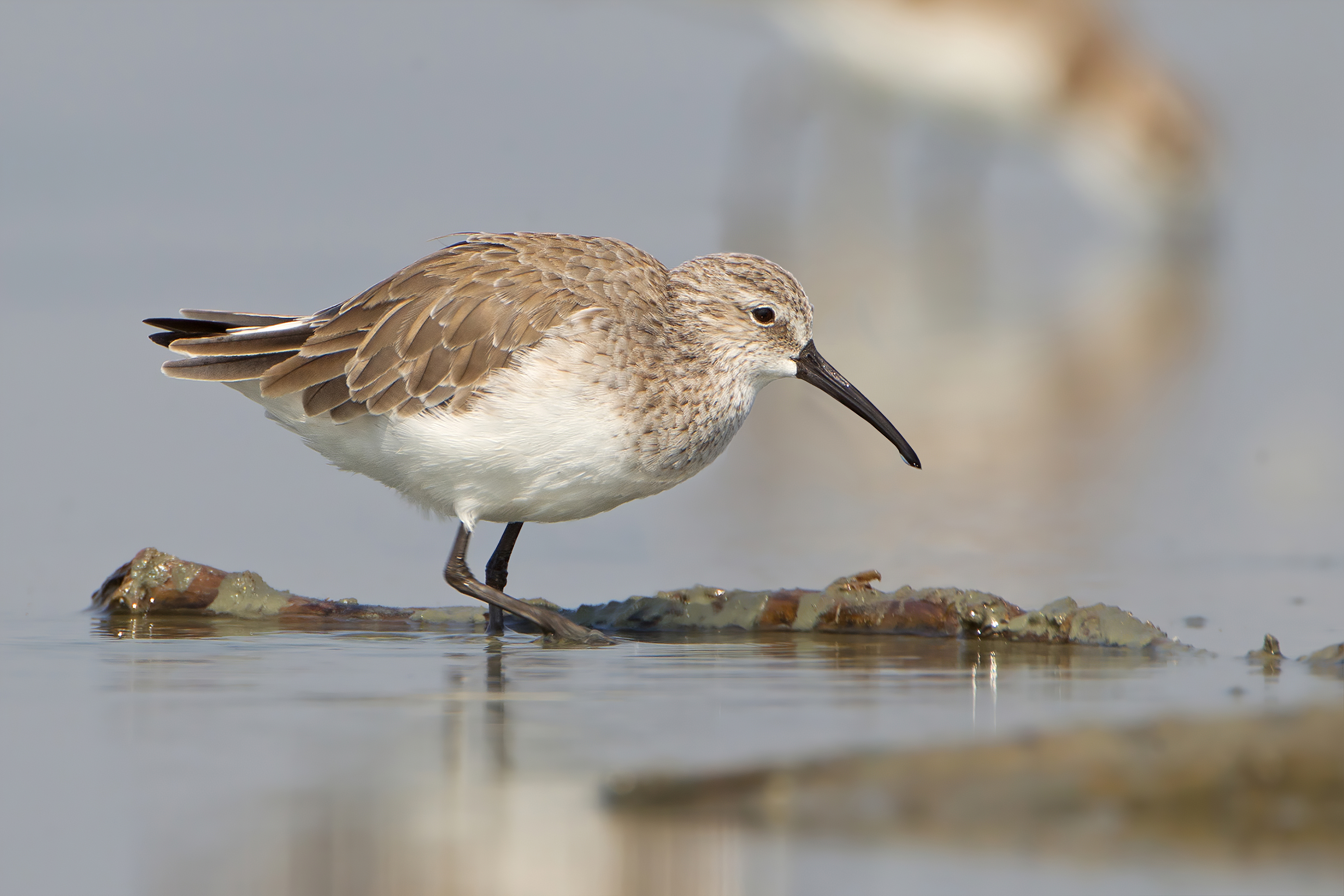
An adult curlew sandpiper in non-breeding plumage. It has black legs.

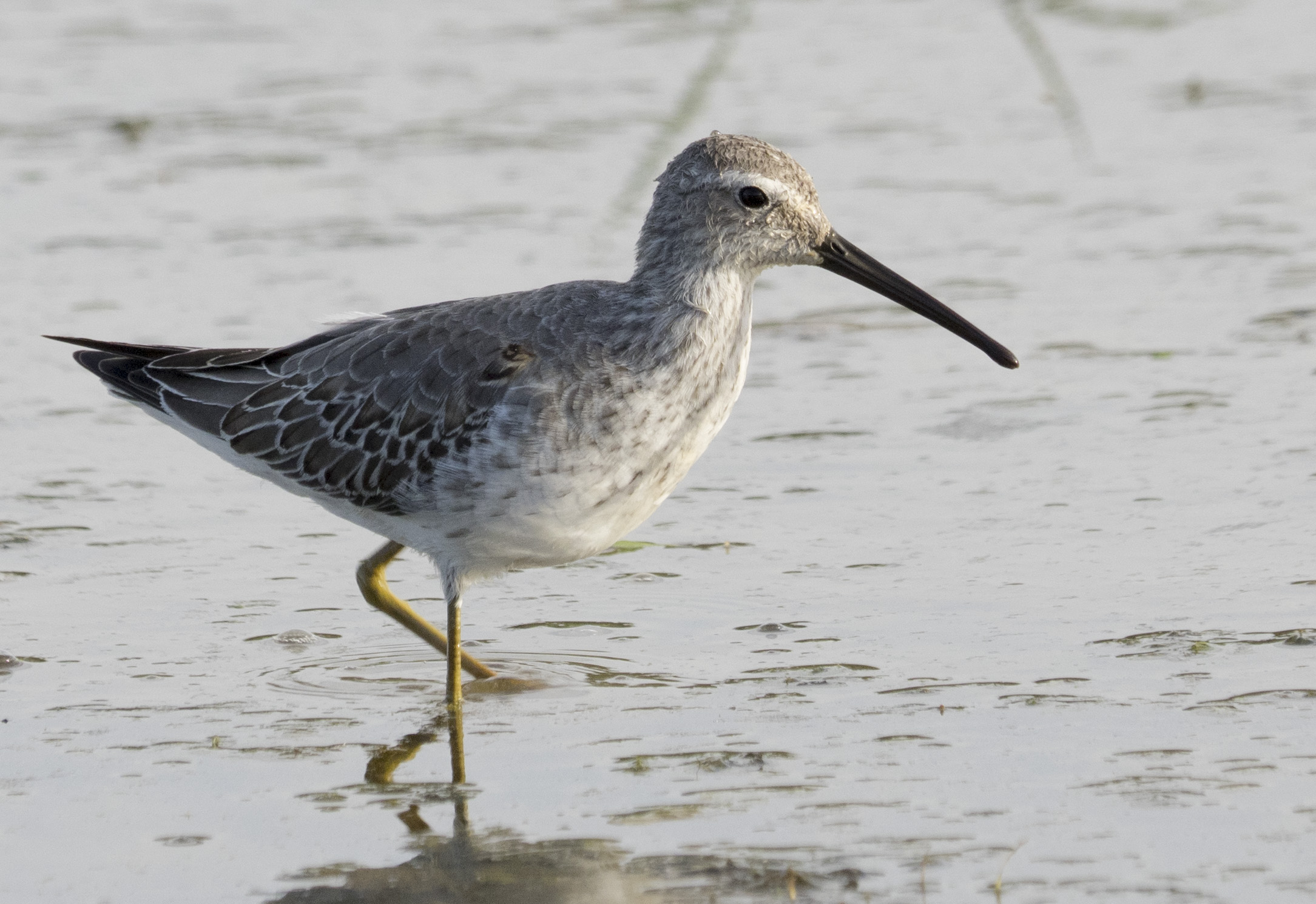
A stilt sandpiper in non-breeding plumage. It has yellow legs.

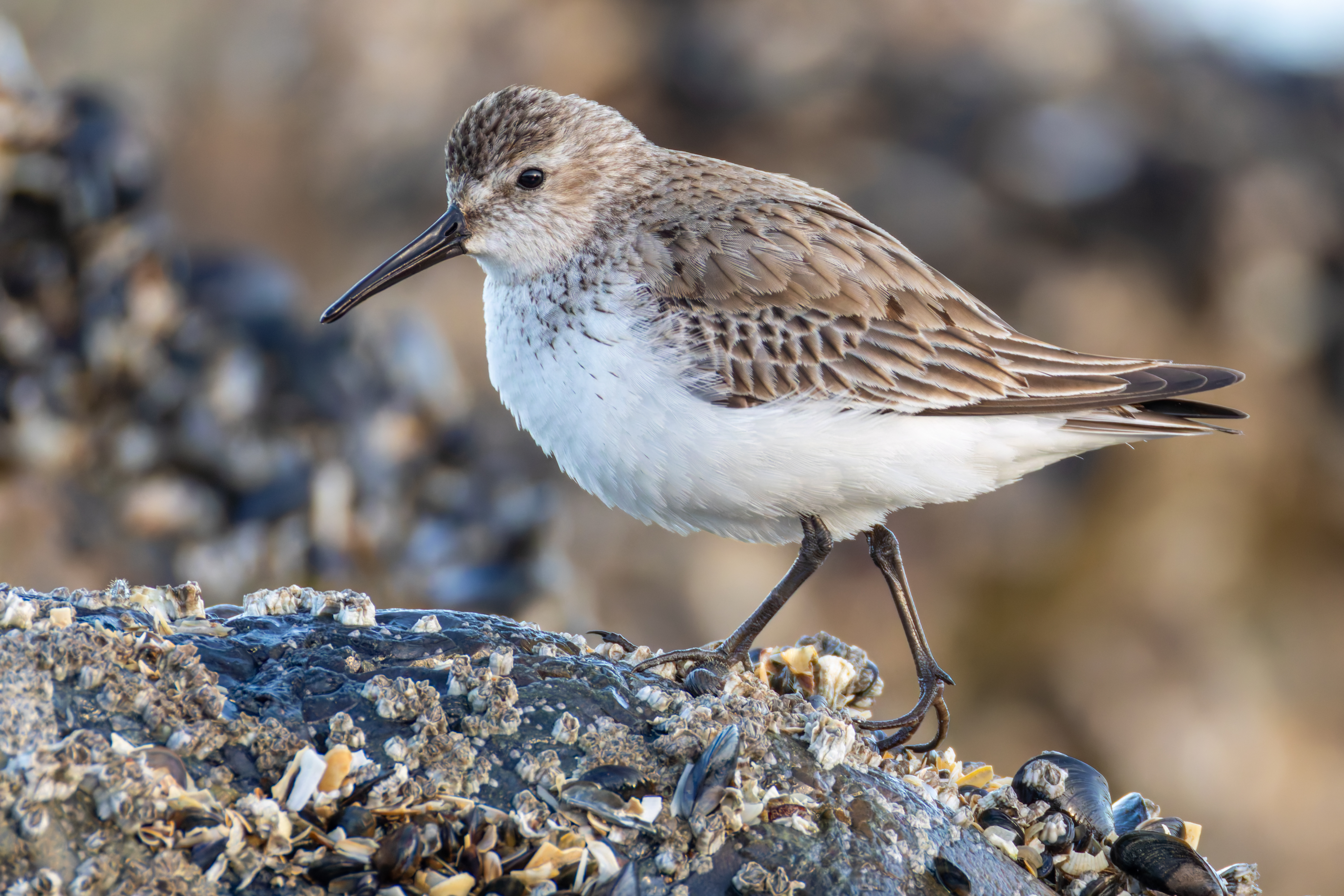
A dunlin in non-breeding plumage

In juvenile plumage, the curlew sandpiper can be confused most easily with the juvenile female ruff, which is similar in body colour and build, though it is darker, larger, and has a shorter bill, and its legs are yellow instead of black. The dunlin also looks similar but can be slightly more compact in shape and is usually (though not always) shorter-billed; it can easily be distinguished by its streaked breast and flanks, and brown or black spots along the sides of its upper belly.

Similar species while in juvenile plumage

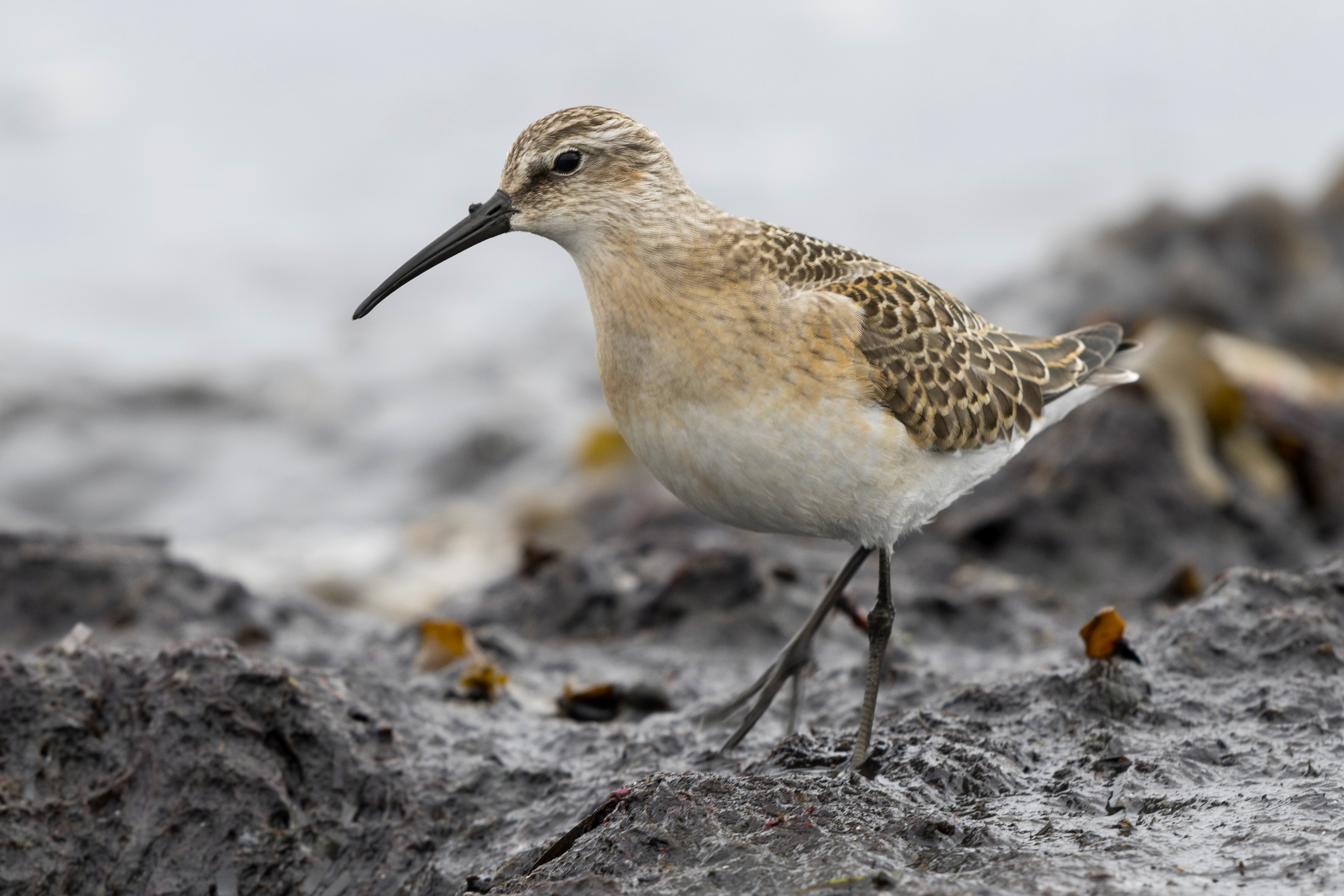
Juvenile curlew sandpiper. It has black legs, a peachy breast, white flanks, and a prominent supercilium.

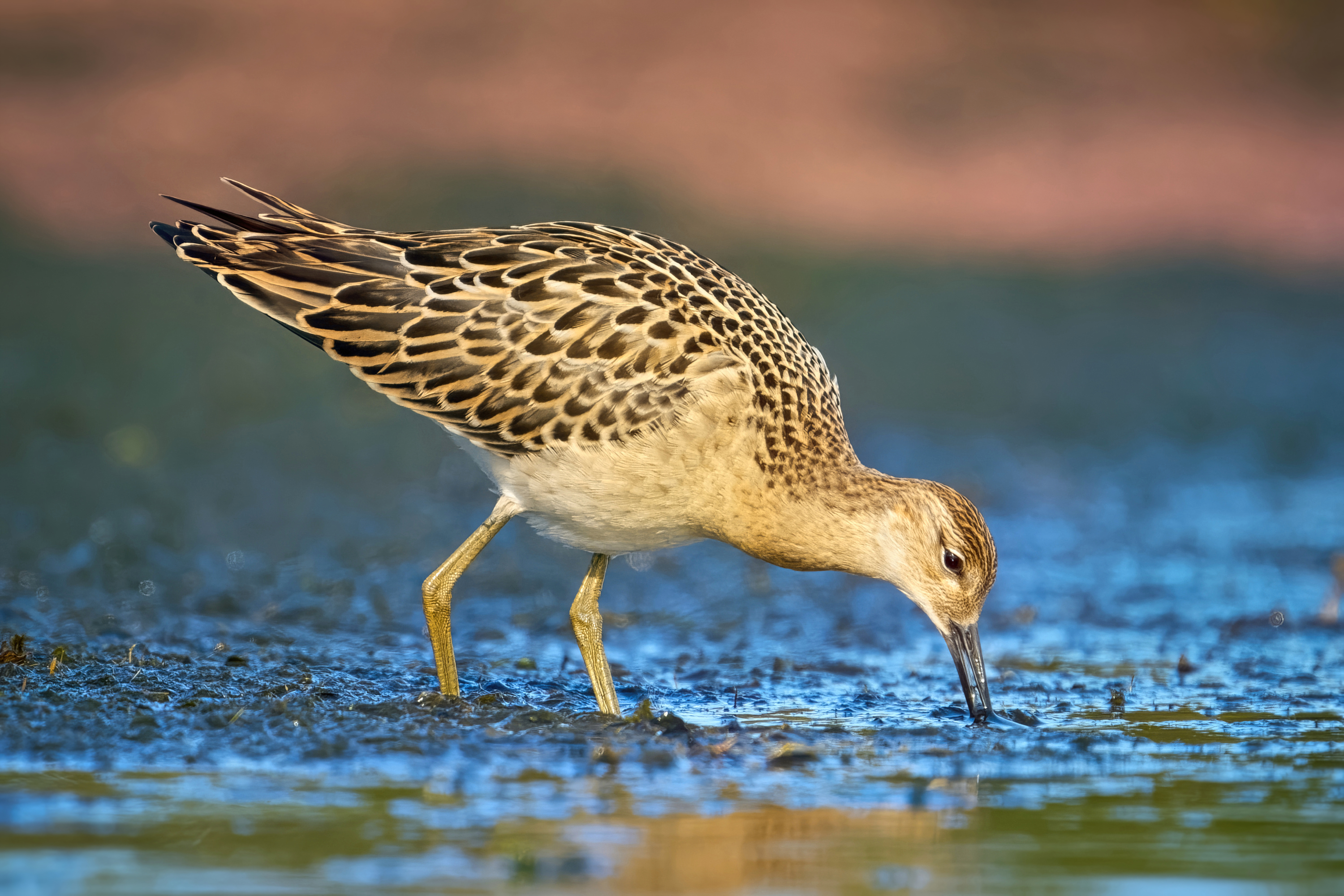
Ruff in juvenile plumage. It is of a larger size and has yellowish legs, darker underparts, and a shorter bill.

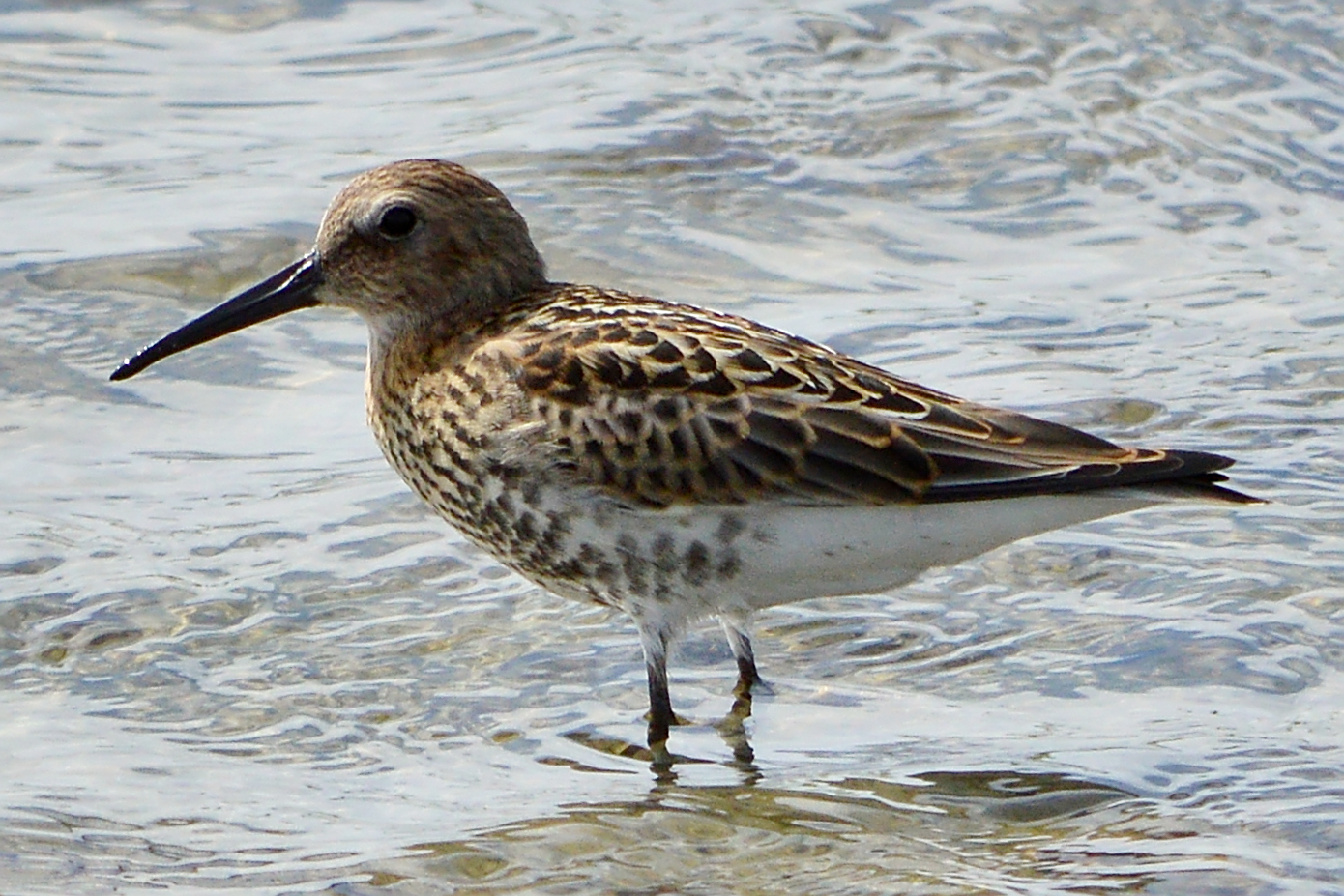
Dunlin in juvenile plumage. It has black streaks on the flanks and breast, compared to the curlew sandpiper's pure white flanks and beige breast.

=== Vocalisations ===
Only the male sings. Each song lasts for 10–15 seconds and consists of several parts, starting with several introductory notes, followed by multiple trilled doublets, a four-part phrase, and several drawn-out whine calls. Both genders vocalise calls. (Note: Calls are less complex and briefer than songs, and are usually uttered by both genders.) The alarm call is a whik, whik, whik repeated or wik-ki-ki-ki... used on the breeding grounds to warn of potential threats, and the chase call is a shrill, musical twittering given primarily by the male but occasionally by the female during courtship flights. The flight call is a chirrup that drops in the middle, usually uttered during takeoff. The whine call is a loud and ascending whaay, whaay, whaay, audible hundreds of metres away, nearly identical to the stilt sandpiper's whine. It is only given by the male and seems to be used to defend its territory.

== Distribution and habitat ==
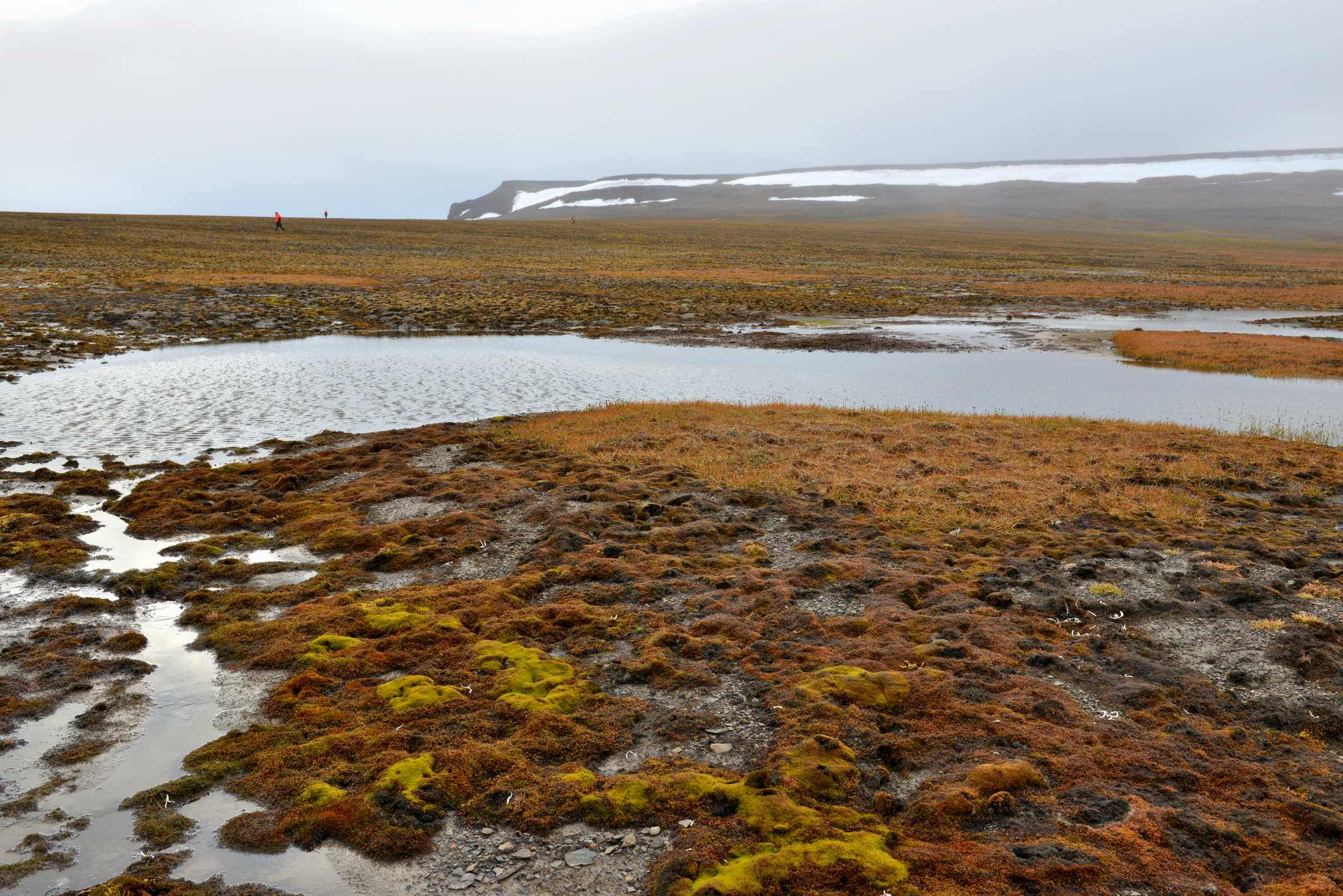
Typical breeding habitat in the high Arctic

The curlew sandpiper can occur throughout large swathes of Afro-Eurasia during migration. It is notably missing east of the Verkhoyansk Range in eastern Siberia during migration, along with southern inland Asia. It breeds exclusively in the Siberian extreme high Arctic tundra from the Yamal Peninsula to Kolyuchin Bay. It breeds in coastal lowlands and offshore islands, where the severe climate with harsh cold winds and short growing period prevents the growth of shrubs, and melting snow overlying the permafrost creates boggy conditions. The nest is typically placed on the margins of wet hollows or pools, or on the gentle slopes of hummocks, often close to the nests of Pluvialis plovers like grey plover or Pacific golden plover.

Its non-breeding range includes coastal regions of west Africa (from Mauritania to Gabon and including Cape Verde) and southern Africa (inland throughout Mozambique to Namibia to South Africa, and north through Uganda to Kenya). It is additionally present, albeit more rarely, inland from Niger to Chad, along the Republic of the Congo to Angola, and the Nile from Sudan to Egypt and southeastern Tunisia. It is rarer along the coasts of Australasia, as well as inland Victoria and New South Wales. In New Zealand, it can be found on the southeastern coast of the South Island and the entire coastline of the North Island. It also overwinters in coastal South Asia and Southeast Asia. It does not overwinter in the rest of Eurasia. The curlew sandpiper is a scarce migratory vagrant in North America, especially along the Atlantic Seaboard.

During the non-breeding season, it is commonly found along sheltered mudflats, as well as salt pans and wetland edges. While inland, it occupies the edges of various bodies of water, especially if they have muddy or sandy margins; it is also found along sewage ponds. It occupies coastal and inland wetlands during migration, and during breeding, it mostly remains in lowland tundra near bogs, depressions, or pools, away from scrub and other dense vegetation.

=== Migration ===
The curlew sandpiper shows little fidelity to nesting sites, making it hard to predict where a specimen overwinters based on its breeding area. The fidelity to overwintering sites is much higher: adults tend to prefer overwintering in the same regions and resting at stopovers at the same points, and males are more faithful to their sites compared to females. Both sexes have their breeding plumage by the time they arrive at their breeding sites.

Males depart from the breeding grounds when females start incubating, and females depart either when breeding fails or when the young successfully fledge. A curlew sandpiper chick migrates south soon after learning to fly; however, it does not migrate back for breeding during its first breeding season, instead remaining in their overwintering range. In Western Europe, post-breeding migration commences with adults arriving in July, and largely departing onwards before juveniles pass through in August and September.

== Behaviour ==
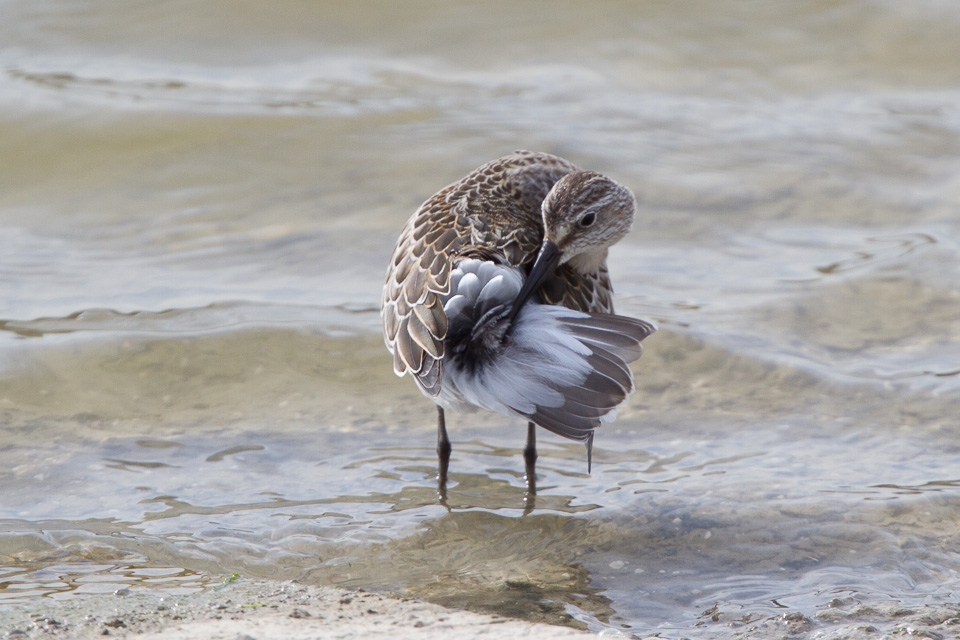
A juvenile preening

The curlew sandpiper appears to be largely monogamous; however, its breeding habits are not well studied. Its ground movements are similar to those of other waders: walking, running, and wading. Its flight speed during migration has been estimated to be around 70–75 km/h. It practices preening and bathing, sometimes scratching its head with its claws and dipping its head in the water to clean it. It mainly roosts at high tide in large mixed-species flocks on sandbars, lagoon islets, and occasionally dunes, reefs, or beach wrack. (Note: Beach wrack is the name for the organic debris washed ashore on beaches, usually consisting of various seaweeds and marine plants like eelgrass or surfgrass.) If disturbed while resting, it will often stretch its wings over its back before hopping on one leg or walking away.

=== Breeding ===
The curlew sandpiper forms pairs during northward migration. Pairs usually arrive at their breeding site in early June and perform courtship in mid-June. The female moves around an area of a few hectares, feeding, and the male follows her attentively, trailing her 3–6 m away, occasionally giving partial or complete songs and conducting various types of courtship behaviour.

During aerial courtship, the male pursues the female in long chases, occasionally catching up. When he catches up, he lifts his wings horizontally and glides towards the female while warbling and occasionally performing his chase call (the female also, although more rarely, performs the chase call). The aerial chase closely resembles chases during territorial conflicts, though the latter is more erratic, with sharper turns and gyrations. After the pair lands, the male then begins one of the ground courtship displays. During the pre-nesting period, the male intermittently assumes a "courtship" stance known as the ground courtship attitude (lowered head, ruffled scapulars and back feathers, and bent legs, resulting in a hunched appearance) during feeding. It is often followed by a full ground courtship display and seems to represent increased libido in males.

The nest-cup display, one of two ground courtship displays, is often preceded by courtship attitude behaviour. The male, in short bursts, moves across the tundra, eventually stepping into a small depression. Once in the depression, he settles down as if it were a nest, folding his wings over his back and raising his tail. He proceeds to wag his wings and tail side to side, occasionally crouching and kicking up lichen and moss with his claws. He then stands up, picks various bits of vegetation from around him, and deposits them at his feet in the faux nest. Even if the bit of vegetation slips, he still mimes the motion of tossing it into the nest. This sequence is typically followed by him stamping his claws or repeating the crouching motion from earlier. During the sequence, he occasionally makes whine notes and trill calls. This display is not an act of nest-building, as the male performs it several times, each in different locations. Females are usually a few metres away but do not seem to pay full attention to the display.

The precopulatory display precedes copulation and is described as elaborate, beginning with both birds standing near each other. The male raises the wing closer to the female, reaching an angle of about 60–70° with the horizontal, and raises the other wing to match it. He also raises his head and lowers and fans his tail. Following this, he gives a short series of warbling calls and sways back and forth, alternating between being behind her and in front of her. He attempts to display his fanned tail and rump to the female by keeping his back always facing her. The female, who has so far ignored him, dashes and thrusts her head towards the male's rump, occasionally overshooting such that her head ends up along the male's flank instead. After around a minute of this display, the female turns away, and the male, with his wings still held up high, approaches to mount and copulate.

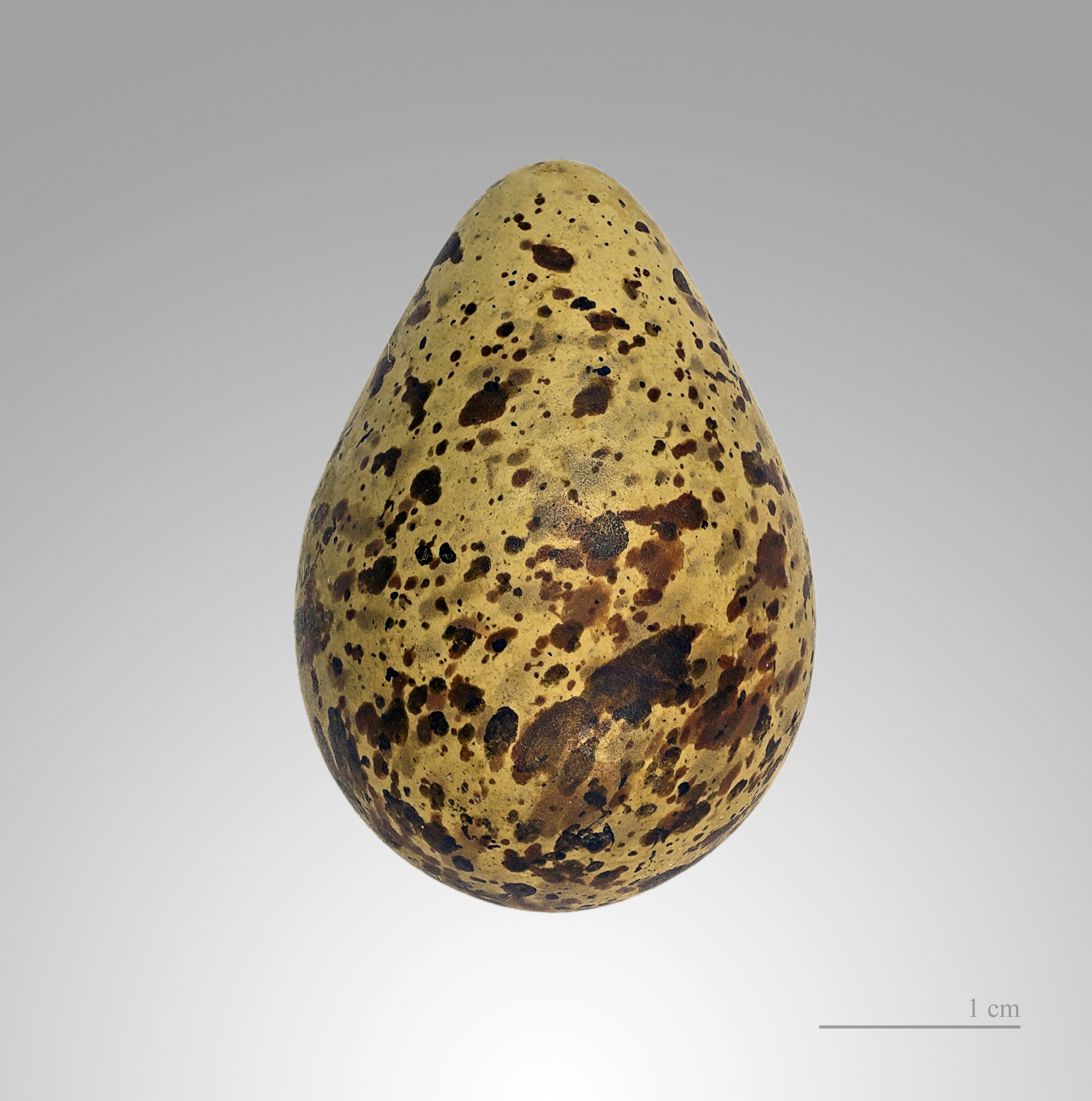
An egg

The breeding grounds are occupied from June until late August. Nesting sites are usually located at the edge of a marsh or pool or on dry patches of tundra, often near nests of other curlew sandpipers. Clutches consist of 3–4 eggs (average 3.76) and are typically laid over the course of three days. The first brood is regularly laid from late June to July, with especially early breeders laying eggs only 5–6 days after arriving and the majority of pairs finishing around the end of June. A second brood may occur for some birds nesting in the far south of their breeding range if the first is unsuccessful. Eggs are slightly pear-shaped and olive-coloured with large dark olive or brown splotches, with more splotches on the broad end, giving them a roughly continuous shade of olive-brown. The female incubates the eggs alone for 20 days.

At birth, the nestlings are relatively mature and mobile, covered with down, and begin to wander from the nest after drying. On average, the nestling weighs 8.2 g, with a bill length of 10.8 mm, a tarsus length of 23.2 mm, and a wingspan of 17 mm. The growth rate is proportional to temperature, with lower temperatures corresponding to slower growth and vice versa. The female leads the nestlings to good feeding habitats, and they become completely independent at 14–20 days of age. By the time they fledge, the nestlings weigh on average 49.6 g, with a bill length of 27.8 mm, tarsus length of 30.8 mm, and a wingspan of 94.5 mm.

=== Territorial behaviour ===
The male curlew sandpiper is territorial, chasing off other birds, including dunlin, Baird's sandpipers, and pectoral sandpipers. Territories are 1.6–4.0 hectares in size for pairs and smaller for individuals. The male performs aerial displays and whine notes to announce his territory, chasing intruders up to the edge of his territory, in flight or on the ground, similar to the aerial courtship display but more erratic, jagged, and rapid. He stops his chases at the territorial boundary, suggesting awareness of his neighbour's territory. Upon concluding a chase, he often performs a flight song while returning. An aggressive ground display was observed in a 1964 study; it consists of the male lowering his head and neck parallel to the ground and pulling them back towards his body, and fanning his tail before running towards the invading bird.

=== Feeding and diet ===
While overwintering and migrating, the curlew sandpiper forages in large flocks (often mixed-species) of up to thousands on tidal flats, shallows, marshes, salt flats, and sewage lagoons, probing the ground for food, sometimes swimming while feeding. In mixed-species wader flocks, it is one of the dominant species, winning 83% of aggressive interactions with dunlin; individual birds feeding on detritus show significantly higher aggression toward dunlin than groups do. While breeding, it forages alone or in much smaller groups. Its diet consists of insects and other small invertebrates such as crabs, molluscs, and worms, supplemented with various seeds. In the High Arctic, chicks feed on Diptera (90%), with the majority belonging to families Chironomidae and Tipulidae. As the female is larger and longer-billed than the male, she is more likely to wade and tends to take larger, more calorically rewarding prey; in a study at Langebaan Lagoon, South Africa, she ate half as many gastropods, double the mass of crustaceans, and 25% fewer polychaetes. Juveniles forage significantly more slowly than adults, likely due to inexperience and reduced motivation. Unlike adults preparing to return to breeding grounds, juveniles typically remain on the overwintering grounds throughout the breeding season.

=== Survival ===
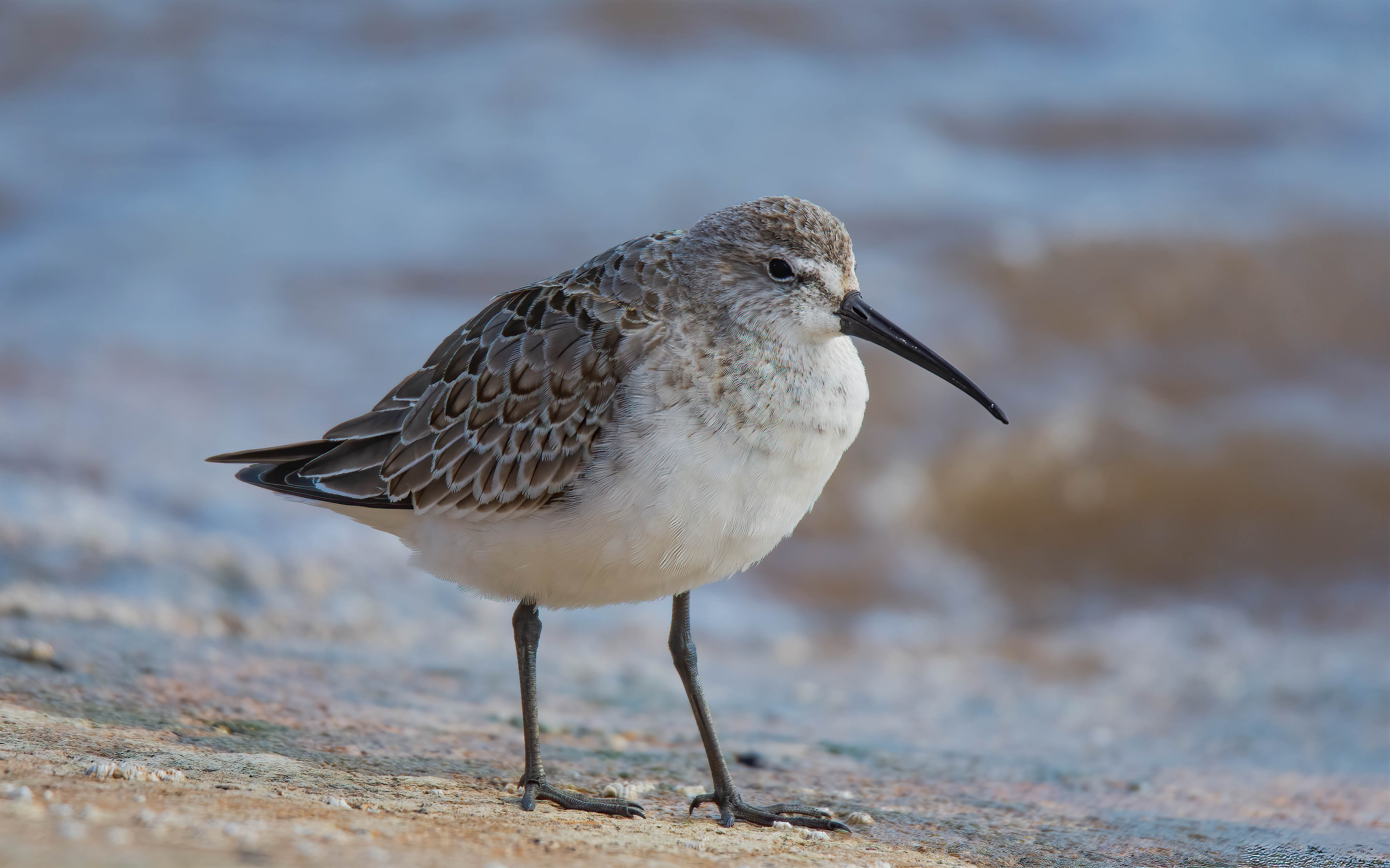
A juvenile

The curlew sandpiper has an estimated annual survival rate of 75–80%, with the oldest observed one being 19 years old. Its breeding success has not been directly measured.

The curlew sandpiper is illegally trapped along the south-east coast of India around Point Calimere and hunted while migrating through the Yellow and East China seas. Waders are also occasionally targeted in the Arabian Peninsula. It is additionally hunted along the Asian–East African Flyway; however, the scope of hunting is not well known. Heavy-metal pollution may be linked to adverse health effects; concentrations of chromium, lead, and cadmium in faecal samples from birds on the west coast of India were found to be increasing from 2019 to 2023.

The reproductive success of this species is strongly related to the population of lemmings, specifically the West Siberian, East Siberian, and Arctic lemmings. In years with fewer lemmings, predatory species such as Arctic foxes, snowy owls, and skuas (Note: Specifically the long-tailed, Arctic, and Pomarine skuas.) hunt Arctic-breeding waders, including the curlew sandpiper, instead of their mammalian prey. Arctic-breeding waders are also preyed upon by brown bears, red foxes, sables, and stoats. Peregrine falcons, black falcons, and rufous-breasted sparrowhawks have been observed preying upon curlew sandpipers.

The curlew sandpiper is subject to infestations from parasitic worms, with a total of 154 worms collected from five curlew sandpipers as part of a migratory bird study in Tasmania. Nadejdolepis paranitidulans was the most common parasite, present in 87% of all birds collected. A total of five species of parasitic worms were observed, with four cestodes and one trematode. The curlew sandpiper is susceptible to avian influenza and botulism.

== Conservation ==
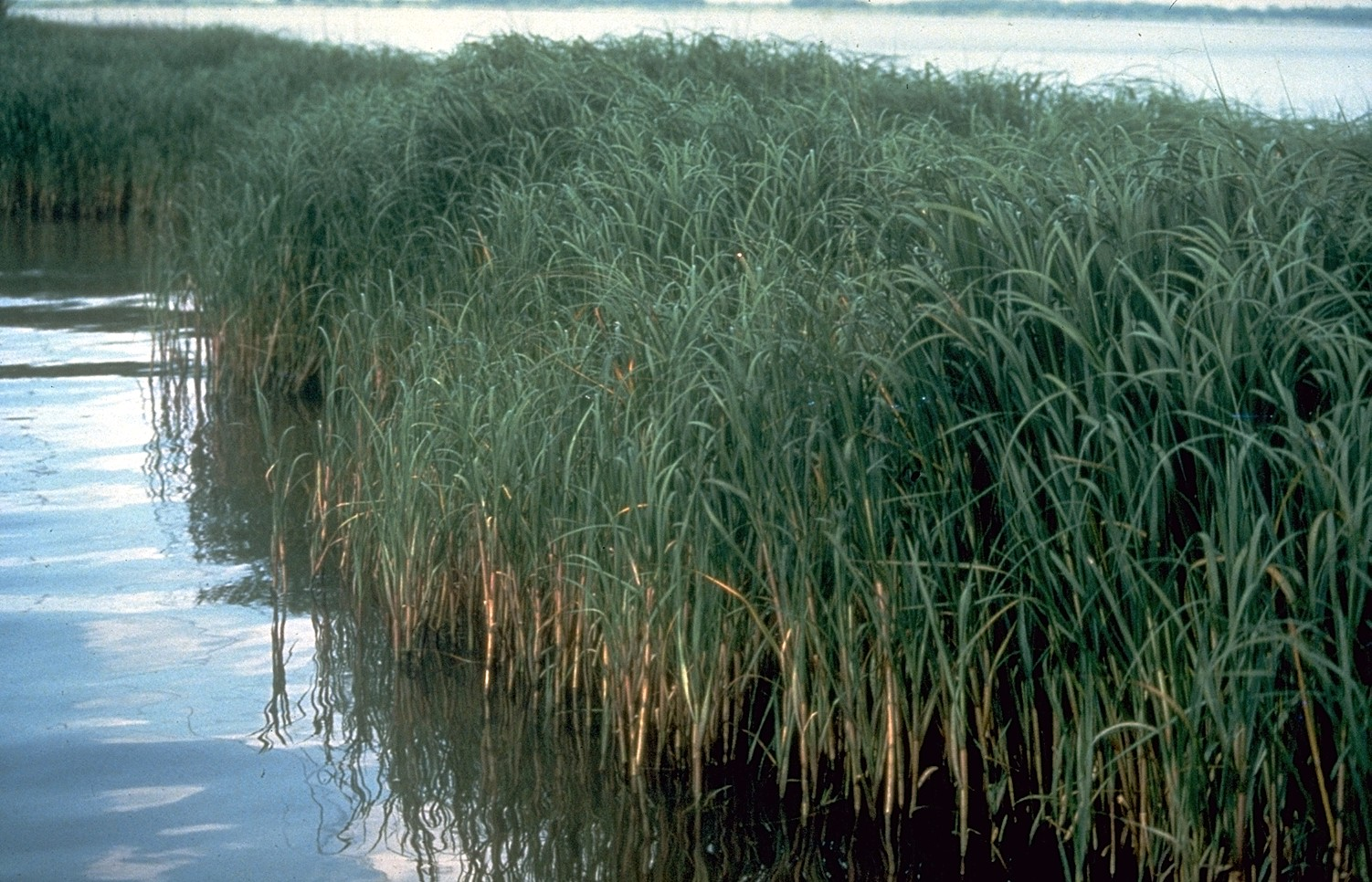
Smooth cordgrass can occupy the curlew sandpiper's habitat.

BirdLife International, which provides the IUCN conservation status for birds, considers the curlew sandpiper to be a vulnerable species. Despite its vast extent of occurrence (3 million km^{2}) and large population, the population has declined by an estimated 30–49% over the span of 15 years. The species is protected by the Agreement on the Conservation of African-Eurasian Migratory Waterbirds.

The global population of the curlew sandpiper is estimated at 0.7–1.2 million individuals, including 420,000–960,000 mature birds. Approximately 300,000–400,000 individuals winter in South Africa, while another 400,000 winter across Southwest Asia, East Africa, and southern Africa. An estimated 200,000 winter in South Asia; however, this figure may be an overestimate. The East Asian–Australasian Flyway population is estimated at 120,000.

The curlew sandpiper has experienced habitat loss throughout its wintering and migratory ranges. On the coast of the Yellow Sea, 65% of intertidal habitats have been lost over the past 50 years, and the area of reclaimed land exceeds the extent of the remaining intertidal mudflats, which may have been a major cause of the population decline. In China, the rate of reclamation has slowed since 2013 and has essentially ceased as of 2018. Reclamation has continued around the Korean Peninsula. Another major factor in habitat loss is the invasive smooth cordgrass, which may make occupied mudflats unsuitable habitats. The causes of the curlew sandpiper's declining breeding productivity are not fully understood; proposed factors include fewer lemming outbreaks, a mismatch between the timing of breeding and peak insect abundance, and breeding habitat alteration, all potentially resulting from climate change.

== Bibliography ==
- BirdLife International (2024). "Calidris ferruginea". IUCN Red List of Threatened Species. 2024 e.T22693431A180593985. doi:10.2305/IUCN.UK.2024-2.RLTS.T22693431A180593985.en.
- Holmes, Richard; Pitelka, Frank (1964). "Breeding Behavior and Taxonomic Relationships of the Curlew Sandpiper". The Auk. 81 (3): 362–379. eISSN 1938-4254. ISSN 0004-8038.
- Mlodinow, Steven G.; Medrano, Fernando (2023). Sly, N D; Keeney, B. K. (eds.). "Curlew Sandpiper (Calidris ferruginea), Version 2.0". Birds of the World. Ithaca, New York: Cornell Lab of Ornithology. doi:10.2173/bow.cursan.02. ISSN 2771-3105.
