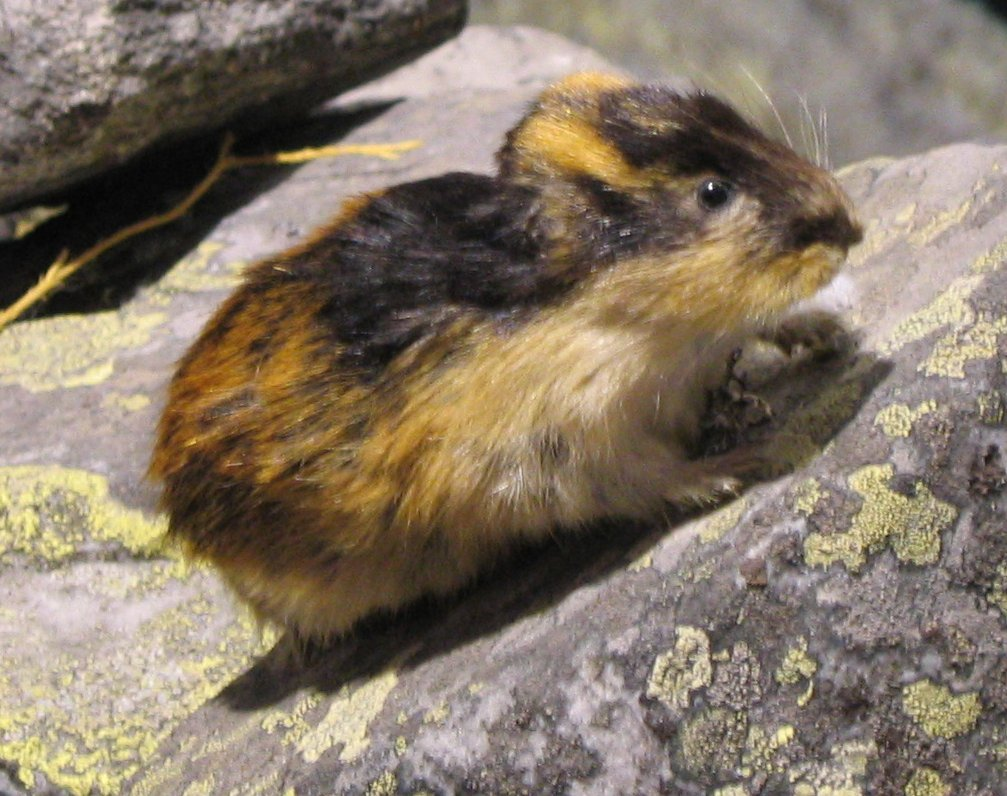
- Norway lemming (Lemmus lemmus)

Scientific classification
- Kingdom: Animalia
- Phylum: Chordata
- Class: Mammalia
- Order: Rodentia
- Family: Cricetidae
- Subfamily: Arvicolinae
- Tribe: Lemmini
- Genus: Lemmus; Link, 1795

Type species
- Mus lemmus Linnaeus, 1758

Species
- L. amurensis L. lemmus L. nigripes L. paulus L. sibiricus L. trimucronatus

Synonyms
- Myodes

= True lemming =

True lemmings Temporal range: Pleistocene - Recent

Genus of rodents

The genus Lemmus contains several species of lemming sometimes referred to as the true lemmings. They are distributed throughout the Holarctic, particularly in the Palearctic.

== Description ==
Head and body is 10-13.5 cm, and tail length is 18–26 mm. Weight ranges from 40-112 g. They are grey or brown. Unlike the collared lemmings, their coats do not change color in winter. They stay brown and grey.

== Natural history ==
These lemmings are found predominantly in tundra or high elevations. Populations can fluctuate widely and mass migrations do take place. This mass migration is probably the source of the myth that lemmings commit mass suicide. These intense population booms appear to be most common in the northern part of its range (such as Lapland).

Gestation is 16–23 days. Litters are 1-13 (7 average). Young are sexually mature after 14 days. When conditions are favorable, these demographic parameters allow for a veritable explosion in population size.

== Species ==
- Amur lemming - (Lemmus amurensis)
- Norway lemming - (Lemmus lemmus)
- Beringian lemming - (Lemmus nigripes)
- East Siberian lemming - (Lemmus paulus)
- West Siberian lemming - (Lemmus sibiricus)
- Canadian lemming - (Lemmus trimucronatus)
