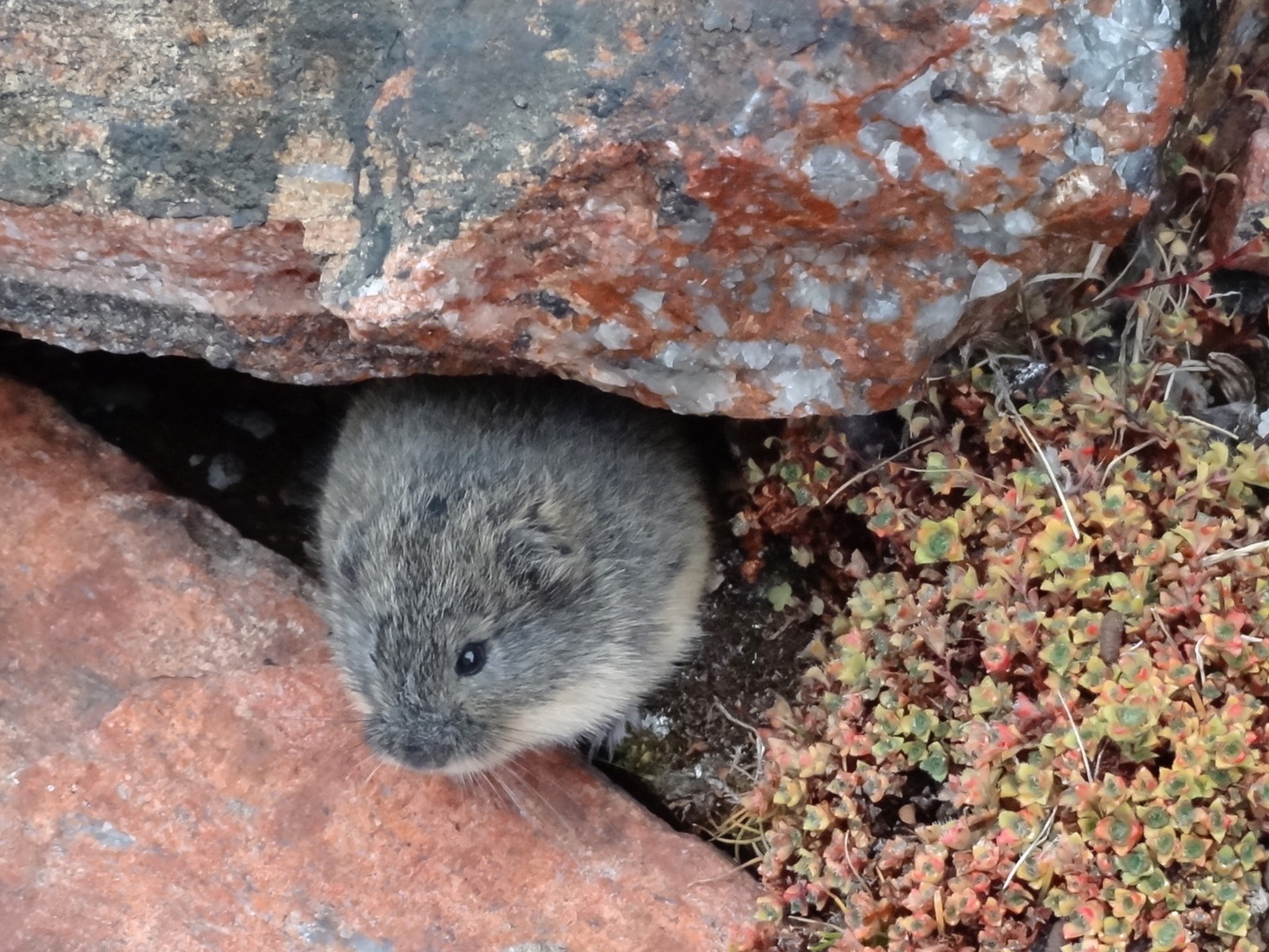
- Canadian lemming

Conservation status
- Least Concern (IUCN 3.1)

- Secure (NatureServe)

Scientific classification
- Kingdom: Animalia
- Phylum: Chordata
- Class: Mammalia
- Order: Rodentia
- Family: Cricetidae
- Subfamily: Arvicolinae
- Genus: Lemmus
- Species: L. trimucronatus

Binomial name
- Lemmus trimucronatus (Richardson, 1825)
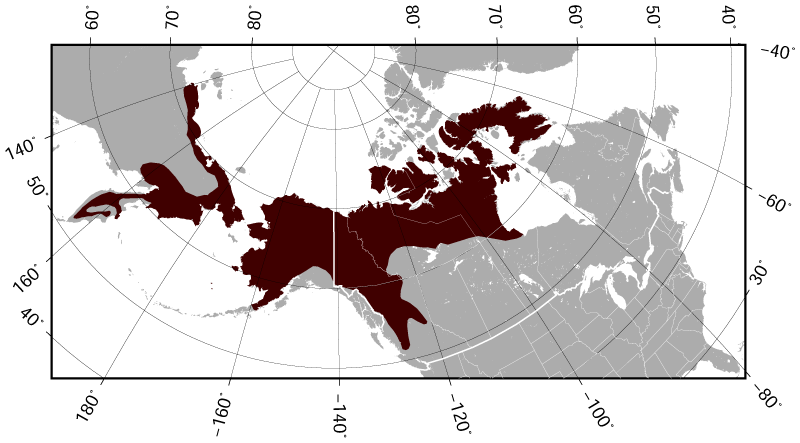
- North American brown lemming range (includes range of L. nigripes)

= Canadian lemming =

Species of rodent

The Canadian lemming or Nearctic brown lemming (Lemmus trimucronatus) is a small North American lemming.

== Taxonomy ==
The taxonomy of the Canadian lemming is tangled with the Siberian brown lemming and the Beringian lemming.

The Canadian lemming was formerly thought to be a subspecies of the Siberian brown lemming (Lemmus sibiricus), but those were split into two distinct species. They were still considered the same species as the Beringian lemming (Lemmus nigripes); the combined species was named the North American brown lemming with the scientific name L. trimucronatus, and was thought to range from eastern Siberia to North America. Recent phylogenetic studies showed them to also be distinct species, although sister groups to one another.

== Physical characteristics ==
Lemmings are a brown in colour, with a reddish-brown back and rump, while the head and shoulders are grey. In the winter, the coat becomes longer and greyer. The female averages 12.5 cm (4.9 in) in length and weighs 58 g (2.0 oz), while the male averages 13 cm (5.1 in) and weighs 68 g (2.4 oz). Like other lemmings, it has small ears, short legs and a very short tail. The feet, both the soles and toes, are covered with bristles and are adapted for burrowing.

== Habitat ==
The lemming is found in the tundra areas of northern Canada (Nunavut, Northwest Territories, Yukon), and southern Alaska south of the Alaska Range. It is also found on the west coast of British Columbia almost as far south as Vancouver Island. Although this species was formerly thought to exist in eastern Siberia and most of Alaska, that species has now been found to be L. nigripes.

They feed mainly on grass shoots and will also eat tundra grass, sedge, moss, bark, berries, lichens, and roots. Predators include most carnivores and certain birds, and some evidence suggests caribou may sometimes eat them. In years when the brown lemming is scarce, some predators, such as the Arctic fox, may be unable to reproduce.

== Colonies ==
They live underground, in colonies, and may produce up to three litters each year, including under the snow in winter. With a gestation period of 23 days, the female will give birth from four to nine young. The brown lemming is not migratory and when overpopulated (and during mating season), they will fight amongst themselves.

Bylot Island has several wetlands with shallow polygons and many types of mosses, grasses and sedges, which suits the North American brown lemming very well for several reasons (Rochefort et al. 1996). On Bylot Island they prefer to live in the South plain of the island and mostly live in the polygon fen, also known as wetlands, which mostly supports the graminoids that they rely on for food (Bety et al. 2002). During winter brown lemmings live in insulated burrows in the ground made out of sedges and grasses (Reid et al. 2011). They make their nests in these confined burrows underground because it increases insulation and allows them to reproduce during winter (Duchesne et al. 2011). Studies on Bylot Island have shown that brown lemmings prefer to burrow under increasing snow depth rather than more dense. They believe that brown lemmings do this because the more snow depth the better energy is trapped and the number of nests increased. Deeper snow cover also protected lemmings and their nests from avian predators; mammalian predators can still forage for them but since their nests are so deep it decreases the ability of some predators to see, therefore, they are very well protected from predators (Duchesne et al. 2011; Reid et al. 2012). During summer, brown lemmings do not have the cover of snow and their territories become a lot more widespread across Bylot Island (Reid et al. 2012).
