= Amur lemming =

Conservation status
- Least Concern (IUCN 3.1)

Scientific classification
- Kingdom: Animalia
- Phylum: Chordata
- Class: Mammalia
- Infraclass: Placentalia
- Order: Rodentia
- Family: Cricetidae
- Subfamily: Arvicolinae
- Genus: Lemmus
- Species: L. amurensis

Binomial name
- Lemmus amurensis Vinogradov, 1924
- Distribution of the Amur lemming

Species of rodent

The Amur lemming (Lemmus amurensis) or Amur brown lemming is a species of true lemming found near the Amur River in Siberia.

== Morphology ==
The Amur lemming is rusty brown with a underbelly. A thin, dark dorsal stripe runs the length of the body. It often has a thicker black stripe running across the dorsal neck, however this may be less pronounced in some individuals. The Amur lemming is typically smaller than other true lemmings, though individual size varies based on locality and season of birth.

== Distribution and ecology ==
The Amur lemming lives further south than its congeners. Specimens have been collected from the Amur region and from southern Yakutia. The Amur lemming inhabits marshes, shrublands, tundra, and larch forests. It feeds on mosses (particularly Dicranum, Drepanocladus, and Hyloomnium mosses), heathers, cotton, grasses, and insects.

== Reproduction ==
Females can birth 2-4 litters per year with 3-9 young in each litter. Females produces fewer pups per little during their first breeding season.

== Description and taxonomy ==
The Amur lemming was described based on a specimen collected in the Amur region in 1914; the site at which it was trapped has since been flooded by the creation of the Zeya Dam.

Lemmus amurencis can produce fertile hybrids with both the Norway lemming (Lemmus lemmus) and the West Siberian lemming (Lemmus sibiricus).

== Conservation status ==
The IUCN Red List lists L. amurencis as a species of least concern. Abramson et al. (2018) dispute this status; they argue that the population has been overestimated based on phylogenetic data. The authors also report failed trapping attempts in regions once inhabited by the Amur lemming which suggest that the some populations are in decline.
