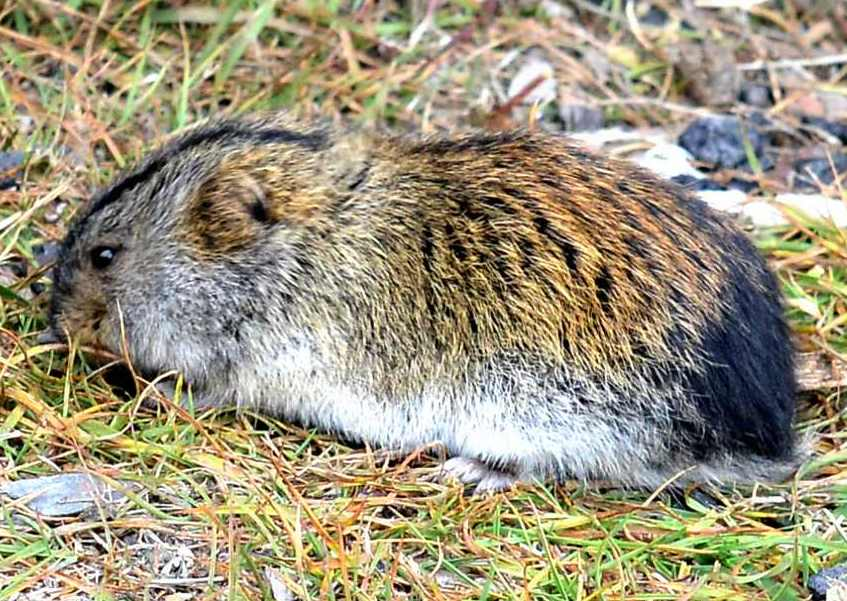
- On Wrangel Island

Scientific classification
- Kingdom: Animalia
- Phylum: Chordata
- Class: Mammalia
- Order: Rodentia
- Family: Cricetidae
- Subfamily: Arvicolinae
- Genus: Lemmus
- Species: L. paulus

Binomial name
- Lemmus paulus Allen, 1914

Synonyms
- Lemmus flavescens Vinogradov, 1925; Lemmus ognevi Vinogradov, 1933; Lemmus portenkoi Tchernyavsky, 1967; Lemmus novosibiricus Vinogradov, 1924

= East Siberian lemming =

Species of rodent

The East Siberian lemming, Eastern Siberian brown lemming, or Ognev's lemming (Lemmus paulus) is a species of lemming endemic to Russia, where it has a disjunct distribution throughout parts of Siberia east of the Verkhoyansk Range.

== Taxonomy ==
It was formerly thought conspecific with the West Siberian lemming (L. sibiricus), which replaces it west of the Verkhoyansk Range, with both species being previously classified together as the Siberian brown lemming. Some populations were also previously classified as populations of the Amur lemming (L. amurensis). More recent genetic studies found both the eastern L. sibiricus and the northern L. amurensis together represent a distinct species. The results of these studies were accepted by the American Society of Mammalogists.

== Distribution ==
There are several disjunct populations; one is found from the Verkhoyansk Range east to the Kolyma River, including the New Siberian Islands; it is largely replaced by the Beringian lemming (L. nigripes) east of this region.

Another population is found south of the aforementioned northern population, being distributed from southern Yakutia and western Khabarovsk north to Magadan; this population was formerly classified as a subspecies of the Amur lemming, L. a. ognevi, or as its own distinct species, L. ognevi. Another population is found throughout most of the Kamchatka Peninsula (this population was also formerly classified as a subspecies of the Amur lemming, L. a. flavescens, or as its own distinct species, L. flavescens) although a disjunct population of L. nigripes is also present in the southern section of the peninsula.

Finally, an isolated population is present on Wrangel Island. This population was previously included as a subspecies of L. sibiricus by Jarrell and Fredga in 1993, while Chernyavskii (also in 1993) regarded it as a separate species, L. portenkoi. However, phylogenetic studies support it being a population of L. paulus.
