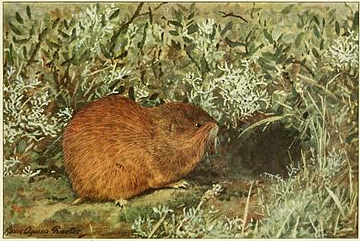
- Illustration by Louis Agassiz Fuertes

Scientific classification
- Kingdom: Animalia
- Phylum: Chordata
- Class: Mammalia
- Order: Rodentia
- Family: Cricetidae
- Subfamily: Arvicolinae
- Genus: Lemmus
- Species: L. nigripes

Binomial name
- Lemmus nigripes (F. W. True, 1894)

= Beringian lemming =

Species of rodent

The Beringian lemming or Beringian brown lemming (Lemmus nigripes) is a species of lemming found in Russia and North America.

== Taxonomy ==
It was formerly considered conspecific with the Canadian lemming (L. trimucronatus) with both species being grouped together as the "North American brown lemming", but genetic studies have affirmed both as being distinct species from one another.

== Distribution ==
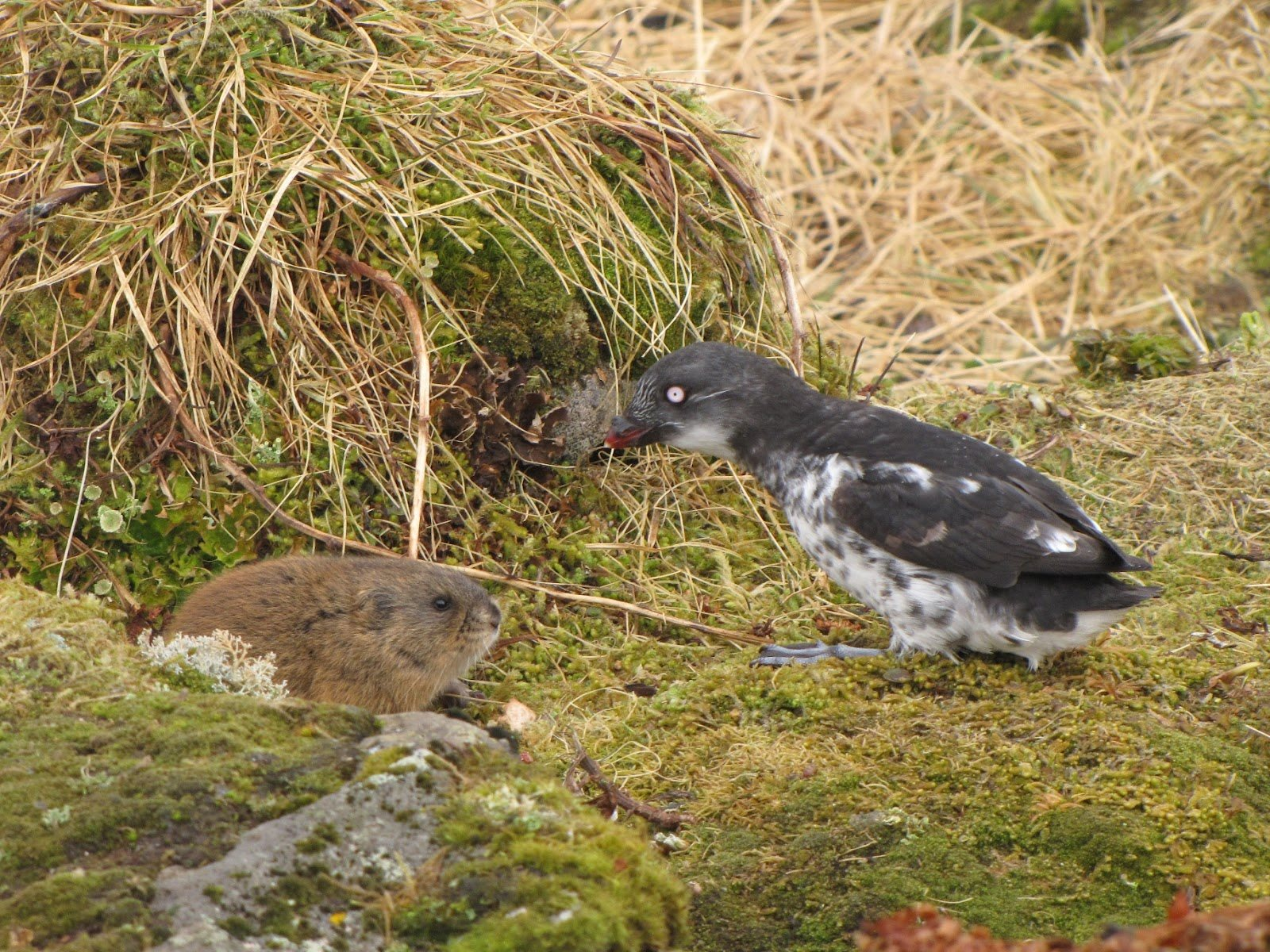
A lemming and a least auklet regard each other on St. George Island (Alaska).

This species is found on both sides of the Bering Sea, and its distribution roughly coincides with the former landmass of Beringia, which it likely inhabited prior to its partial submergence.

In Siberia, it is found east of the Kolyma River (with the East Siberian lemming, L. paulus, being found west of the river) ranging throughout most of Chukotka, northern Magadan, and northern Kamchatka Krai. A disjunct population is also present in the southern Kamchatka Peninsula, which is otherwise inhabited only by L. paulus.

In North America, it is found throughout most of the US state of Alaska (including many of the islands, such as St. Lawrence Island and Nunivak Island) and adjoining portions of Yukon, Canada, but it is not found south of the Alaska Range, where it is replaced by L. trimucronatus.
