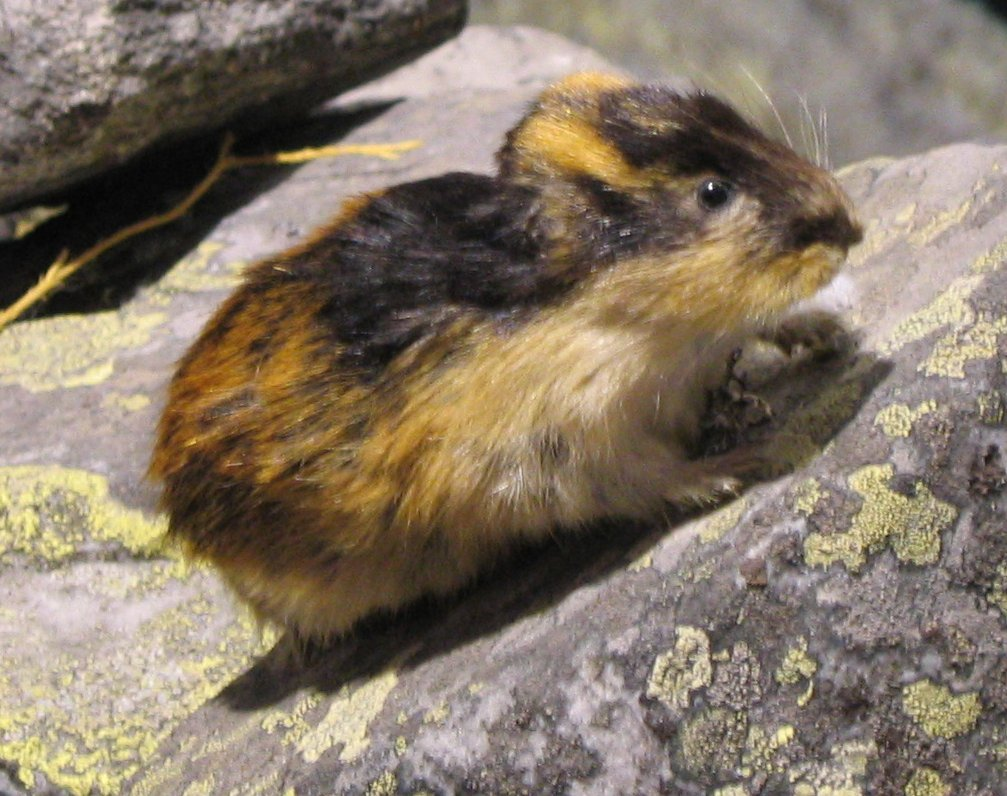
- Stuffed Norway lemming

Conservation status
- Least Concern (IUCN 3.1)

Scientific classification
- Kingdom: Animalia
- Phylum: Chordata
- Class: Mammalia
- Infraclass: Placentalia
- Order: Rodentia
- Family: Cricetidae
- Subfamily: Arvicolinae
- Genus: Lemmus
- Species: L. lemmus

Binomial name
- Lemmus lemmus (Linnaeus, 1758)
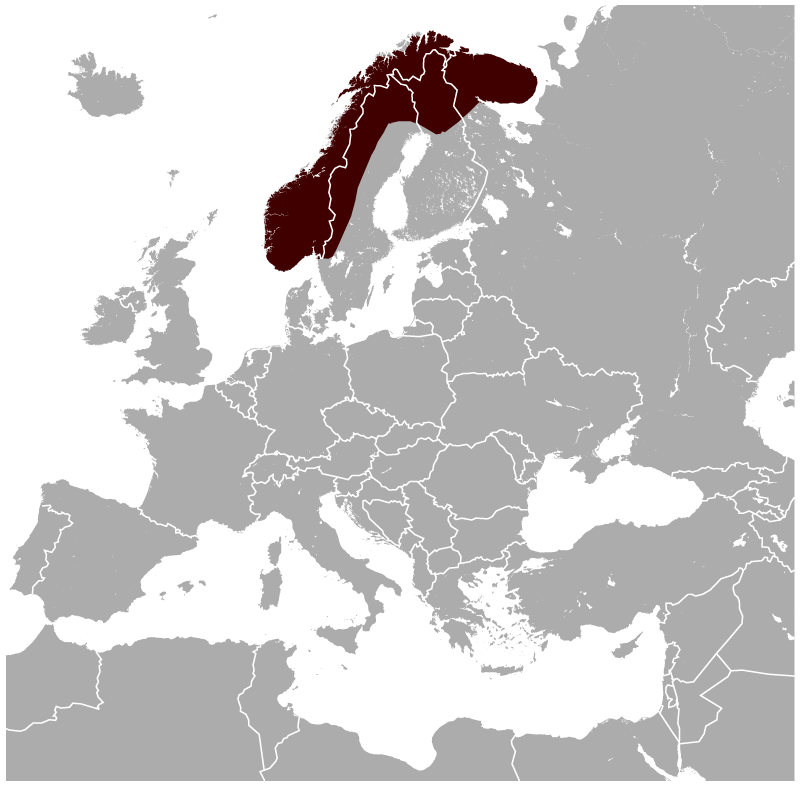
- Norway lemming range

Synonyms
- Mus lemmus Linnaeus, 1758

= Norway lemming =

Norway lemming Temporal range: 2.58–0.0117 Ma Pleistocene to present

Species of rodent

The Norway lemming, also known as the Norwegian lemming (Lemmus lemmus), is a common species of lemming found in northern Fennoscandia, where it is the only vertebrate species endemic to the region. The Norway lemming dwells in tundra and fells, and prefers to live near water. Adults feed primarily on sedges, grasses and moss. They are active at both day and night, alternating naps with periods of activity.

== Distribution ==
It has a wide distribution from western Norway east to the Kola Peninsula. A 2021 study suggests that the lemmings of Novaya Zemlya may also belong to this species; this would extend its range east to Novaya Zemlya island, but these results have not been fully accepted.

== Description ==
The mainland Norway lemming has a bold pattern of black and yellow-brown, which is variable between individuals. In contrast, the Novaya Zemlya lemming has a cryptic gray coloration (hence why it was previously thought to be a population of the Siberian brown lemming). The species grows to a size of 155 mm (6.1 in). The tail is very short 10–19 mm (3/8–3/4 in). It weighs up to 130 g (4.6 oz). The dental formula is 1/1, 0/0, 3/3.

== Behaviour ==
The Norway lemming has a dramatic three- to four-year population cycle, in which the species' population periodically rises to unsustainable levels, leading to high mortality, which causes the population to crash again.

The Norway lemming spends the winter in nests under the snow. When the spring thaws begin and the snow starts to collapse, they must migrate to higher ground, where the snow is still firm enough for safety, or, more commonly, to lower ground, where they spend the summer months. In autumn, they must time their movement back to sheltered higher ground carefully, leaving after alpine snow cover is available for their burrows and nests, and before the lowlands are made uninhabitable by frost and ice.

When the seasons are particularly good (short winters without unexpected thaws or freezes, and long summers), the Norway lemming population can increase exponentially; they reach sexual maturity less than a month after birth, and breed year-round if conditions are right, producing a litter of six to eight young every three to four weeks. Being solitary creatures by nature, the stronger lemmings drive the weaker and younger ones off long before a food shortage occurs. The young lemmings disperse in random directions looking for vacant territory. Where geographical features constrain their movements and channel them into a relatively narrow corridor, large numbers can build up, leading to social friction, distress, and eventually a mass panic can follow, where they flee in all directions. Lemmings do migrate, and in vast numbers sometimes, but notion of a deliberate march into the sea is false.

According to genetic research, the Norwegian lemming survived the Pleistocene glaciation in western Europe, inhabiting various refugia which were not covered by ice. Alternatively, some researchers have contended the Norwegian lemming populations had arisen from ancestors of the present-day brown lemming (L. sibiricus), moving in after glaciers receded. The Novaya Zemlya lemming, which could represent either a subspecies of L. lemmus, or a population of L. sibiricus with mtDNA introgression from ancient hybridization with L. lemmus, supports the former theory.

Despite their diminutive size, when confronted at close quarters by a potential predator, mainland Norway lemmings characteristically become highly aggressive. They have also been known to attack approaching humans. It has been suggested that they may be considered an aposematic subspecies, in that they appear to deter predation by using their prominent coloration, loud calls, and aggressive behavior to advertise their ability to harm small predators (in contrast to the less conspicuous voles). On the other hand, when viewed from a distance, their coloration may also facilitate a cryptic defence option by helping them to fade into the background.

== The "Novaya Zemlya lemming" ==
In 2021, a taxonomic study analyzing a distinct population of lemmings on Novaya Zemlya, previously thought to be Siberian brown lemmings (Lemmus sibiricus), found them to be more closely related to L. lemmus, and reclassified them as a new subspecies, L. l. chernovi, or the Novaya Zemlya lemming, named after zoologist and academician of the Russian Academy of Sciences, Yury I. Chernov. It is currently only known from the southern island of the archipelago. It is thought that prior to the Eemian Interglacial, L. lemmus was distributed widely throughout the Arctic Shelf from Western Europe east to Novaya Zemlya, and sea level rise during the Eemian left the species in its present-day disjunct distribution, with populations only on Fennoscandia and Novaya Zemlya. Novaya Zemlya may have served as a refugium for cold-adapted terrestrial fauna such as L. lemmus during the Pleistocene interglacial periods. The Novaya Zemlya lemming lacks the aposematic coloration of the Norway lemming, being dull in color and lacking antipredator adaptations. It is thought that the aposematic traits may be specific to the mainland population and evolved during its isolation in the Fennoscandian refugium.

An evaluation of the study later in the year by the American Society of Mammalogists stated that the Novaya Zemlya lemming likely represented a population of L. sibiricus with mtDNA introgression from L. lemmus, and thus concluded that pending further research, it would be best to include the Novaya Zemlya lemming within L. sibiricus.

== Gallery ==
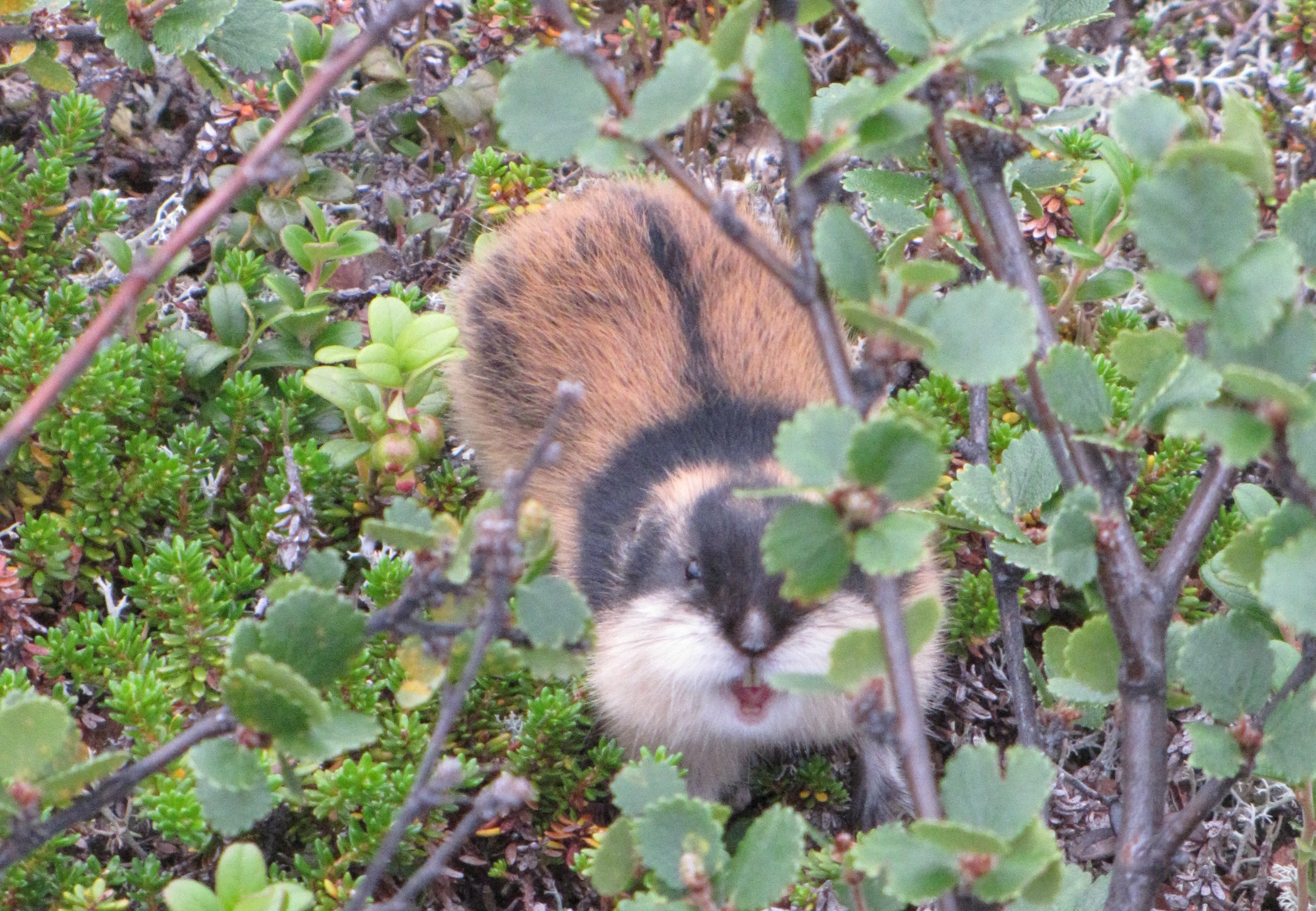
In the summer

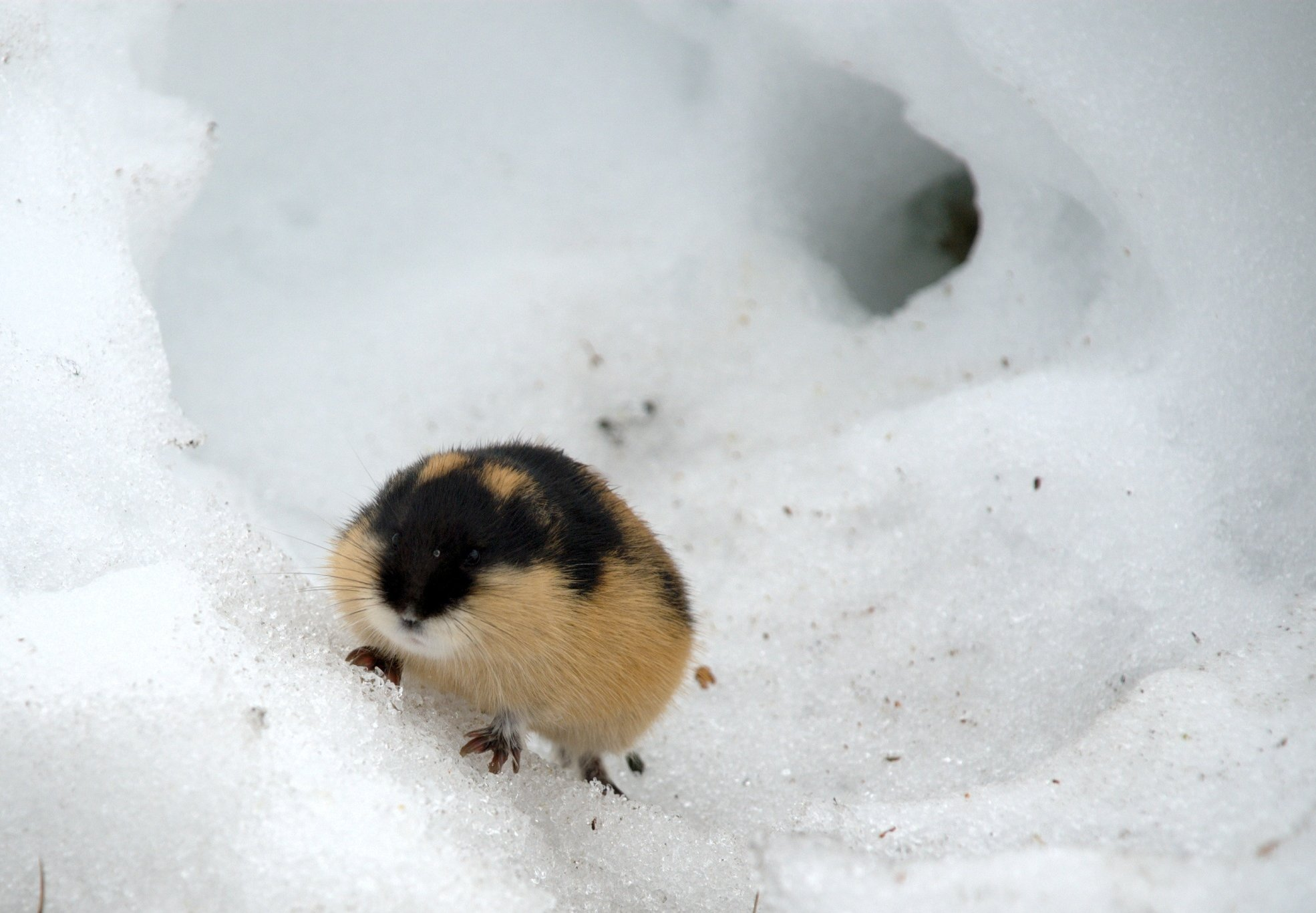
In snow

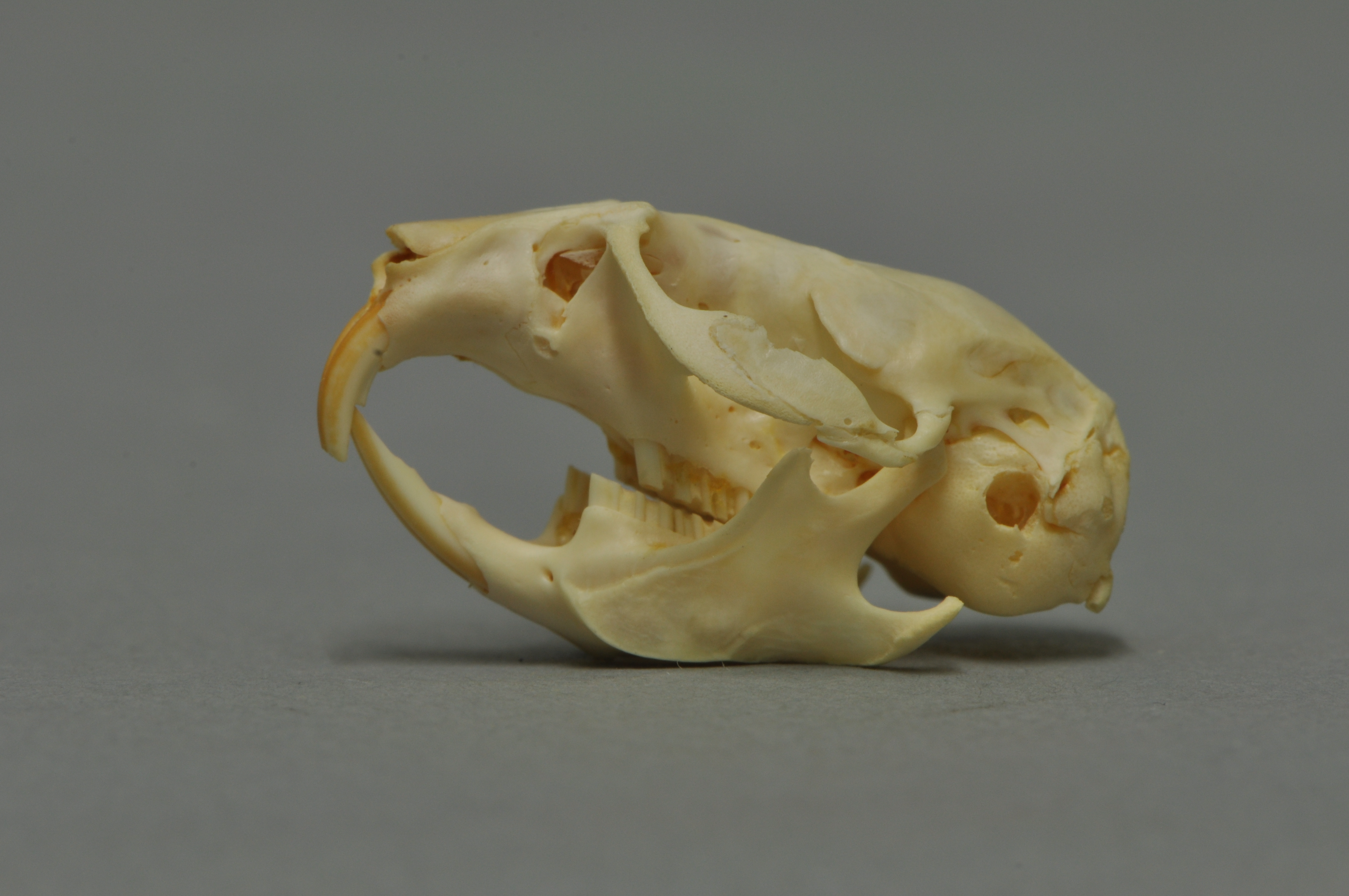
Skull

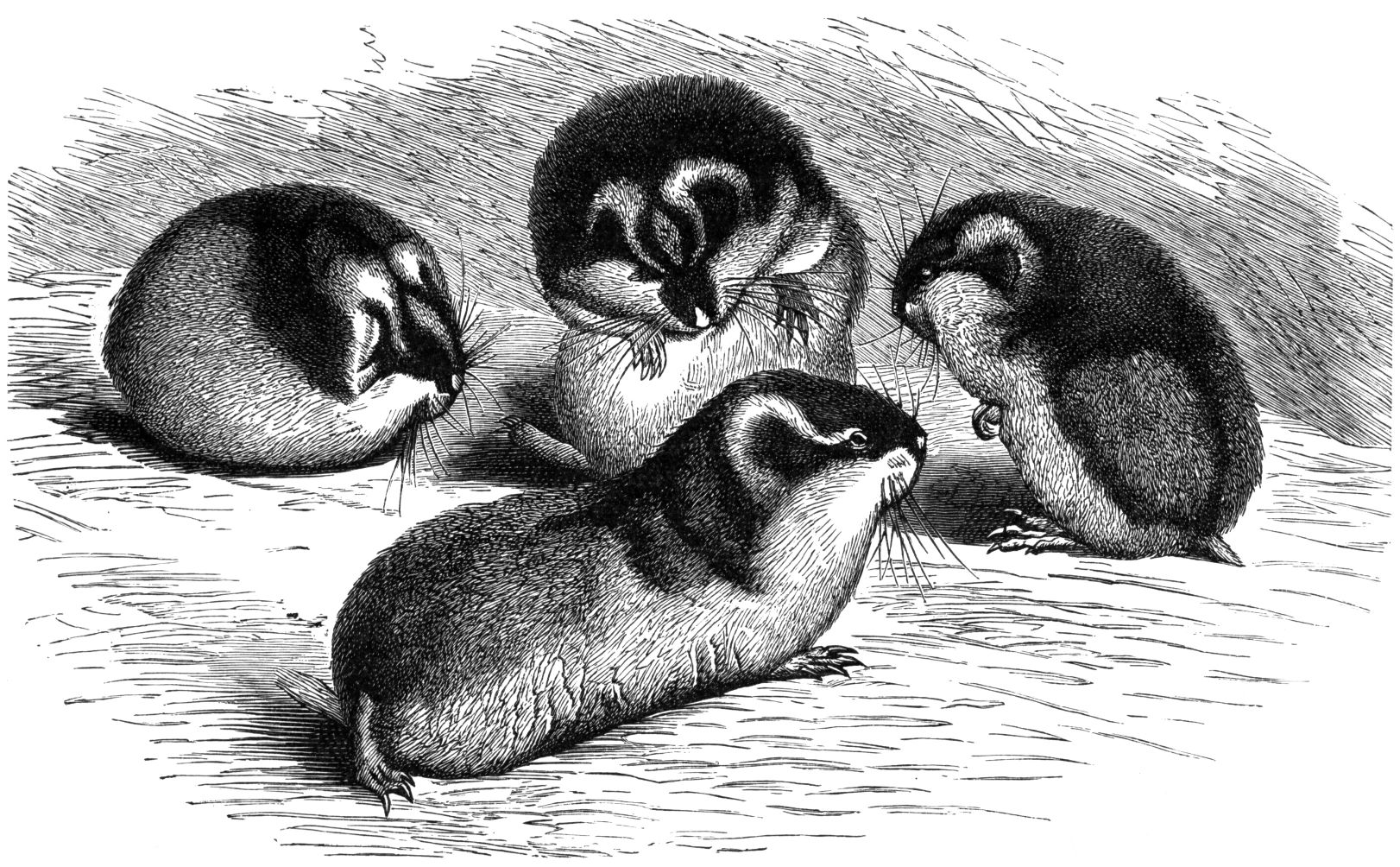
Illustration from Brehms Tierleben

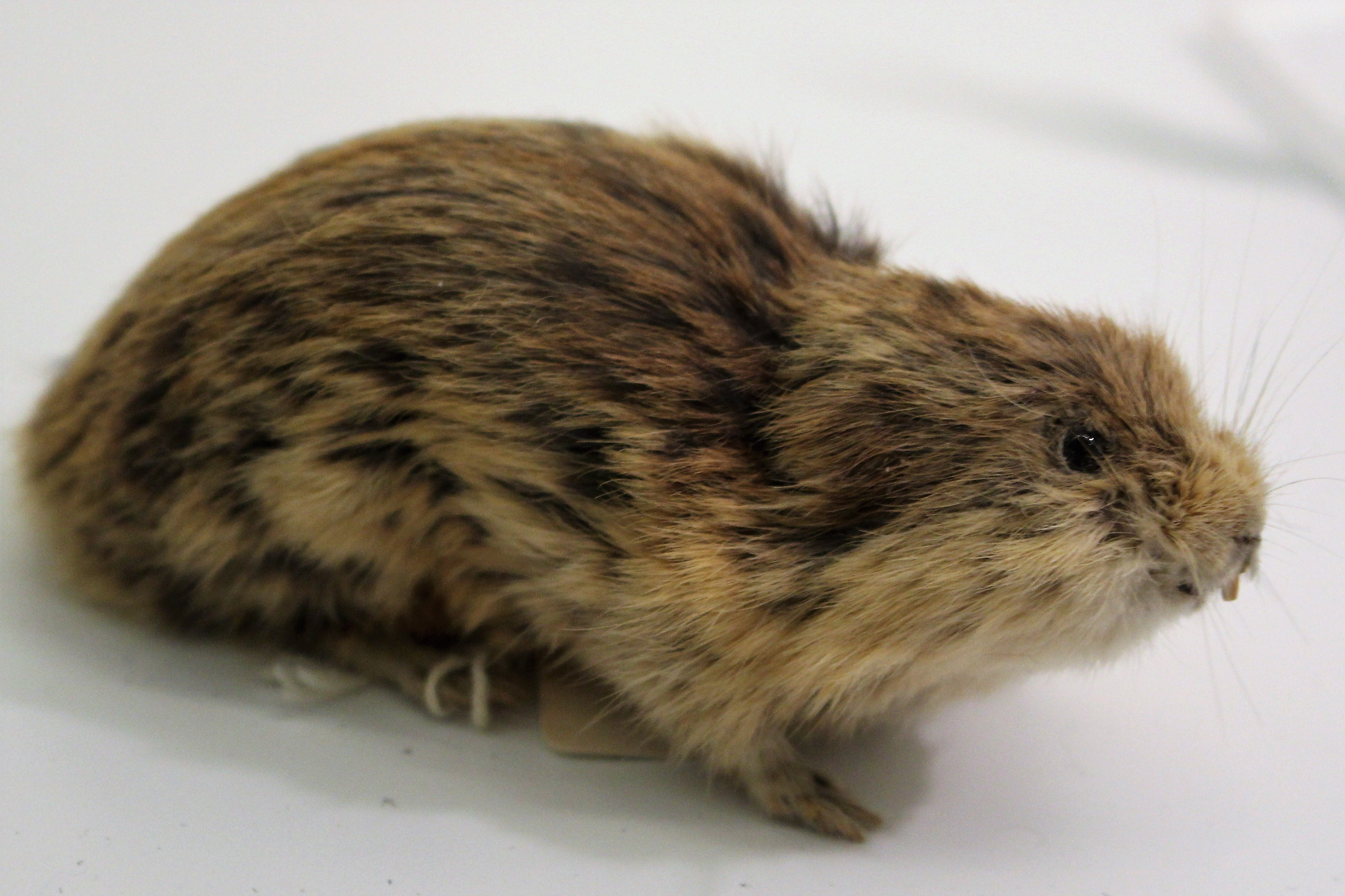
Taxidermy

Media related to Lemmus lemmus at Wikimedia Commons
