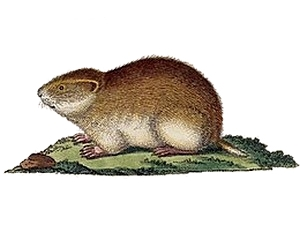

Conservation status
- Least Concern (IUCN 3.1)

Scientific classification
- Kingdom: Animalia
- Phylum: Chordata
- Class: Mammalia
- Order: Rodentia
- Family: Cricetidae
- Subfamily: Arvicolinae
- Genus: Lemmus
- Species: L. sibiricus

Binomial name
- Lemmus sibiricus (Kerr, 1792)
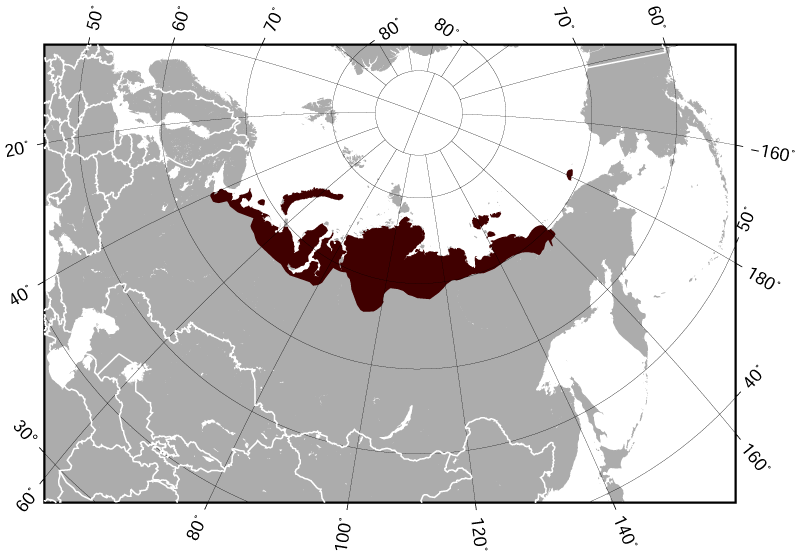
- Siberian brown lemming range (includes range of East Siberian lemming)

Synonyms
- Lemmus lemmus chernovi Spitsyn et al., 2021

= West Siberian lemming =

Species of rodent

The West Siberian lemming or Western Siberian brown lemming (Lemmus sibiricus) is a true lemming species found in the Russian Federation. Like other lemmings, it belongs to the family Cricetidae of rodents.

It is endemic to Russia, where it has a wide range throughout Siberia, from the region just south of the White Sea east all the way to the Verkhoyansk Range, which serves as a barrier between it and the East Siberian lemming (L. paulus), which was formerly considered conspecific with it.

An insular population inhabits Novaya Zemlya; a 2021 study which performed genetic analysis on the mtDNA of the Novaya Zemlya population found them to group with the Norway lemming (L. lemmus) despite their similar appearance to mainland L. sibiricus, and classified them as the subspecies L. l. chernovi, or Novaya Zemlya lemming. However, the American Society of Mammalogists rejected these results pending further evidence, stating that these more likely represented L. sibiricus with ancient mitochondrial introgression from L. lemmus (see the article for L. lemmus for further info).

It does not hibernate during winter; it lives in burrows. It is prey to several animals, including the snowy owl and the Arctic fox. As with other species of lemmings, Siberian browns routinely experience large-scale fluctuations in their population sizes.
