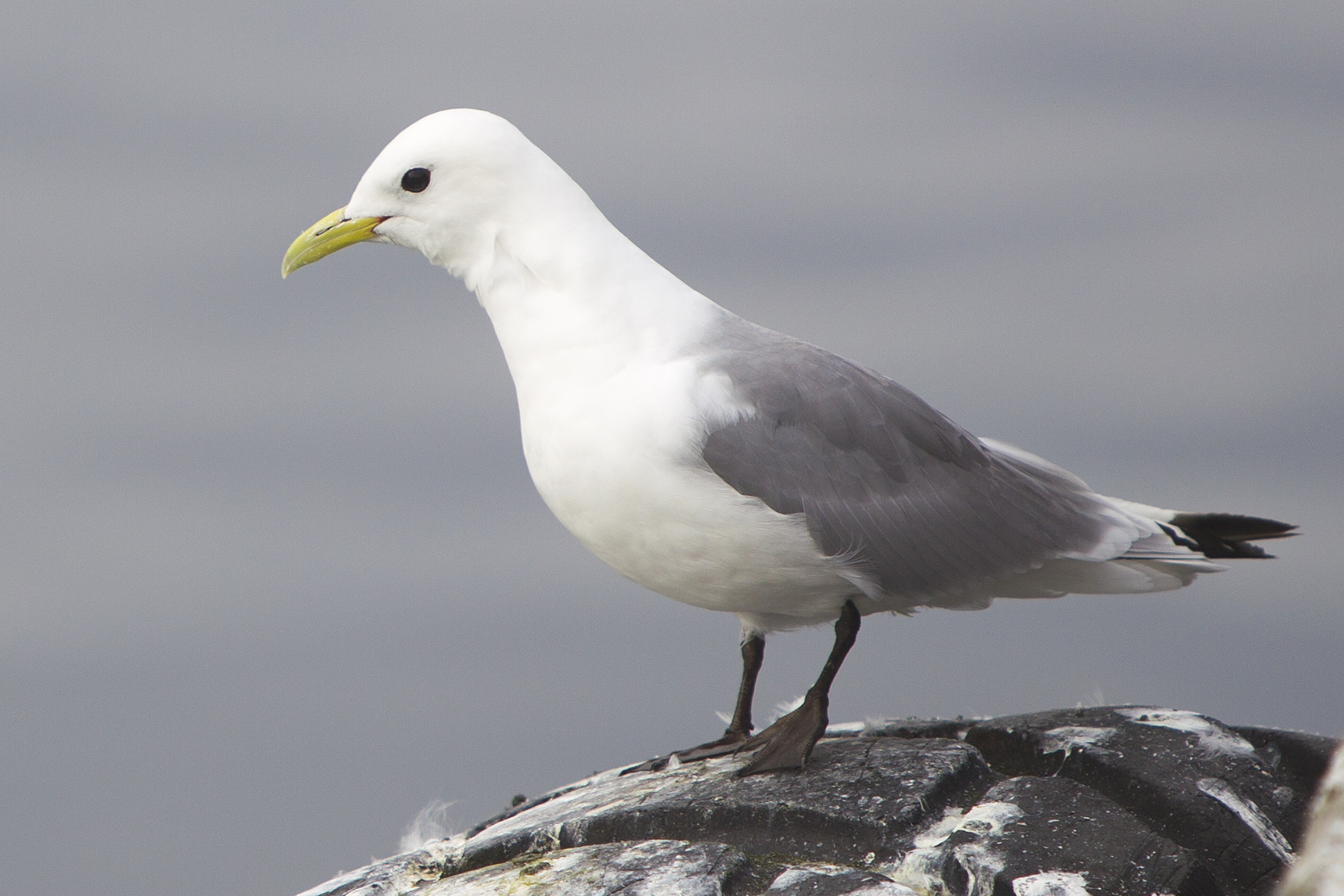
- Rissa tridactyla in Vardø, Norway

Scientific classification
- Kingdom: Animalia
- Phylum: Chordata
- Class: Aves
- Order: Charadriiformes
- Family: Laridae
- Subfamily: Larinae
- Genus: Rissa; Stephens, 1826

Type species
- Rissa brunnichii = Larus tridactylus Stephens, 1826

Species
- Rissa tridactyla; Rissa brevirostris

Audio
- The call of a kittiwake, recorded on Skomer Island, Pembrokeshire, Wales

= Kittiwake =

Genus of birds

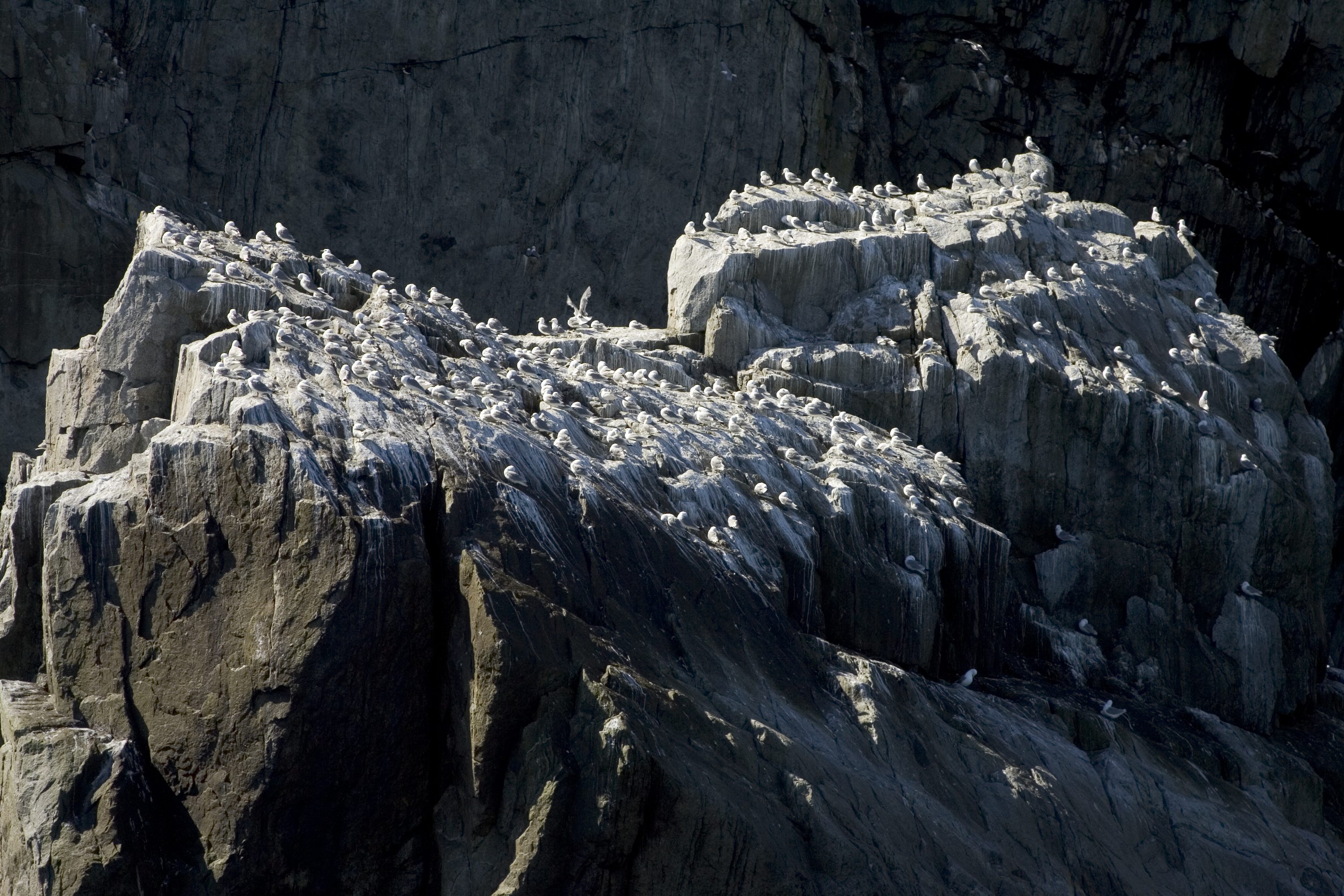
Black-legged kittiwake colony on Big Koniuji, Shumagin Islands

The kittiwakes (genus Rissa) are two closely related seabird species in the gull family Laridae, the black-legged kittiwake (Rissa tridactyla) and the red-legged kittiwake (Rissa brevirostris). The epithets "black-legged" and "red-legged" are used to distinguish the two species in North America, but in Europe, where Rissa brevirostris is not found, the black-legged kittiwake is often known simply as kittiwake. The name is derived from its call, a shrill 'kittee-wa-aaake, kitte-wa-aaake'. The genus name Rissa is from the Icelandic name Rita for the black-legged kittiwake.

== Description ==
The two species are physically very similar. They have a white head and body, grey back, grey wings tipped solid black and a bright yellow bill. Black-legged kittiwake adults are somewhat larger (roughly 40 cm or 16 in in length with a wingspan of 90–100 cm or 35–39 in) than red-legged kittiwakes (35–40 cm or 14–16 in in length with a wingspan around 84–90 cm or 33–35 in). Other differences include a shorter bill, larger eyes, a larger, rounder head and darker grey wings in the red-legged kittiwake. While most black-legged kittiwakes do, indeed, have dark-grey legs, some have pinkish-grey to reddish legs, making colouration a somewhat unreliable identifying marker.

In contrast to the dappled chicks of other gull species, kittiwake chicks are downy and white since they are under relatively little threat of predation, as the nests are on extremely steep cliffs. Unlike other gull chicks which wander around as soon as they can walk, kittiwake chicks instinctively sit still in the nest to avoid falling off. Juveniles take three years to reach maturity. When in winter plumage, both birds have a dark grey smudge behind the eye and a grey hind-neck collar. The sexes are visually indistinguishable.

== Distribution and habitat ==
Kittiwakes are coastal breeding birds ranging in the North Pacific, North Atlantic, and Arctic oceans. They form large, dense, noisy colonies during the summer reproductive period, often sharing habitat with murres. They are the only gull species that are exclusively cliff-nesting. A colony of kittiwakes living in Newcastle upon Tyne and Gateshead in the north east of England has made homes on both the Tyne Bridge and Baltic Centre for Contemporary Art. This colony is notable because it is the furthest inland colony of kittiwakes in the world.

== Species ==
Genus Rissa – Stephens, 1826 – two species
Common name	Scientific name and subspecies	Range	Size and ecology	IUCN status and estimated population
black-legged kittiwake Adult Chick	Rissa tridactyla Linnaeus, 1758 Two subspecies: R. t. tridactyla (Linnaeus, 1758); R. t. pollicaris Ridgway, 1884	Breeding colonies can be found in the Pacific from the Kuril Islands, around the coast of the Sea of Okhotsk throughout the Bering Sea and the Aleutian Islands to southeast Alaska, and in the Atlantic from the Gulf of St. Lawrence through Greenland and the coast of Ireland down to Portugal, as well as in the high Arctic islands. In the winter, the range extends further south and out to sea.	Size: It is one of the most numerous of seabirds. Habitat: At sea or nesting on the sheerest sea cliffs. Diet: Fish, copepods, polychete and squids	VU
red-legged kittiwake Adult Chick	Rissa brevirostris Bruch, 1853	Very limited range in the Bering Sea, breeding only on the Pribilof, Bogoslof, and Buldir islands in the United States, and the Commander Islands in Russia.	Size: Adults are 35–39 cm (14–15 in) long, with an 84–92 cm (33–36 in) wingspan and a weight of 325–510 g (11.5–18.0 oz). Habitat: On these islands, it shares some of the same cliff habitat as the black-legged kittiwake, though some localized segregation is seen between the species on given cliffs. Diet:	VU

== Photo gallery ==
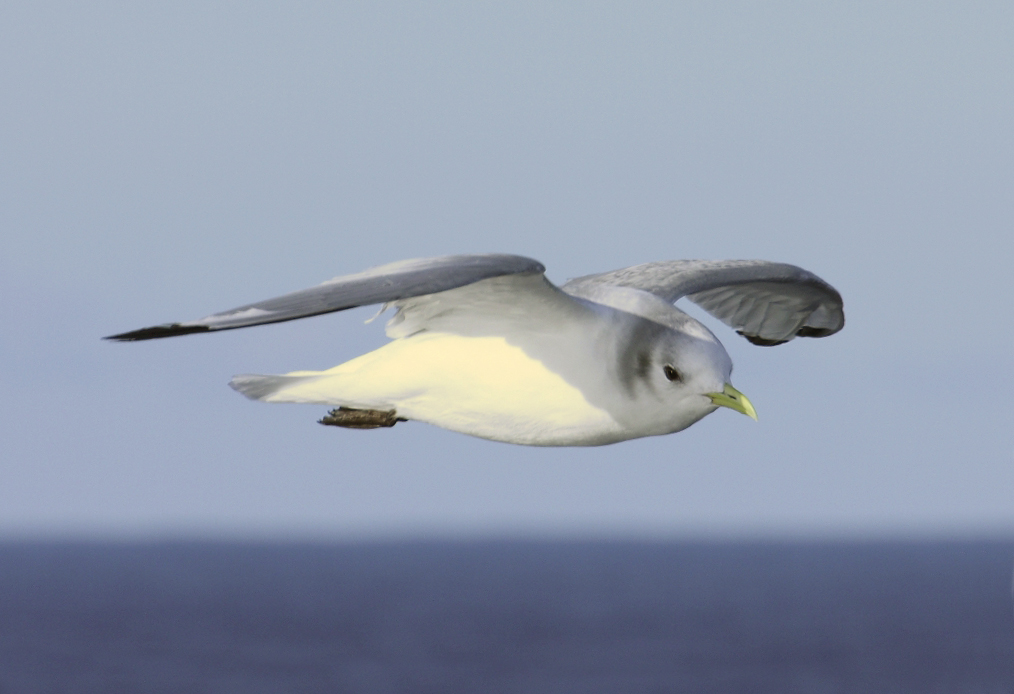
Kittiwake – winter Ireland

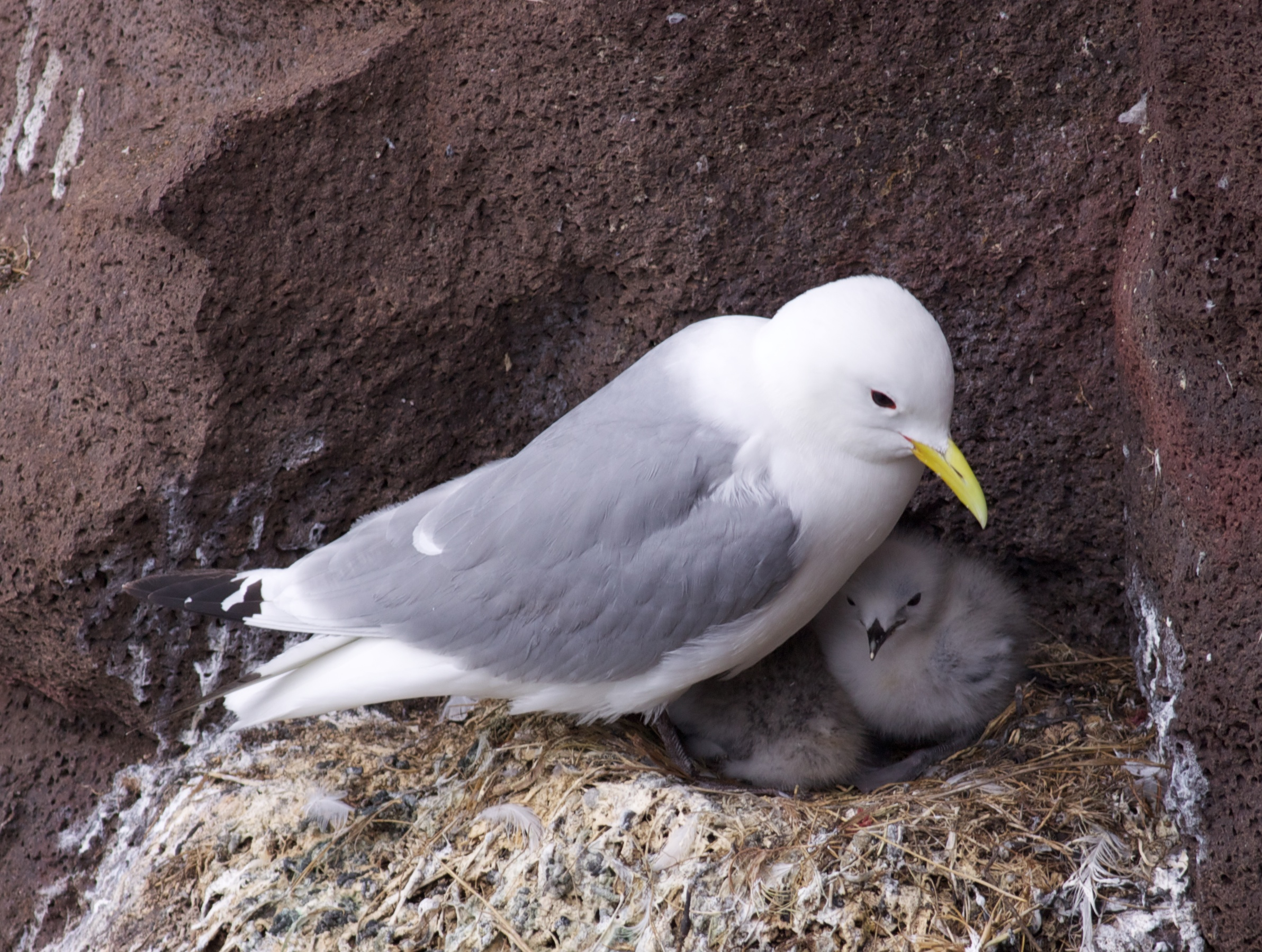
Kittiwake with chicks, Iceland

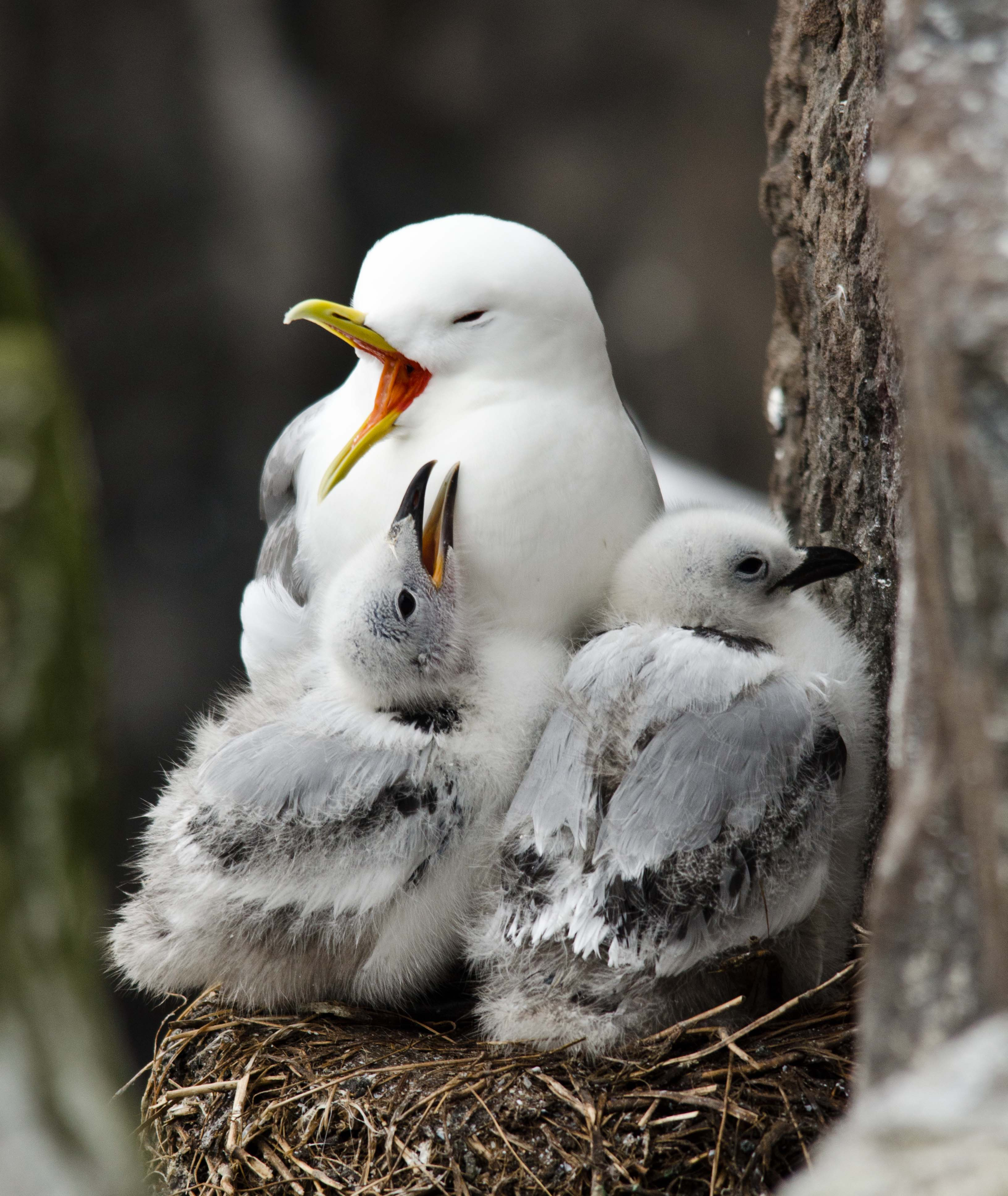
Farne Islands, England
