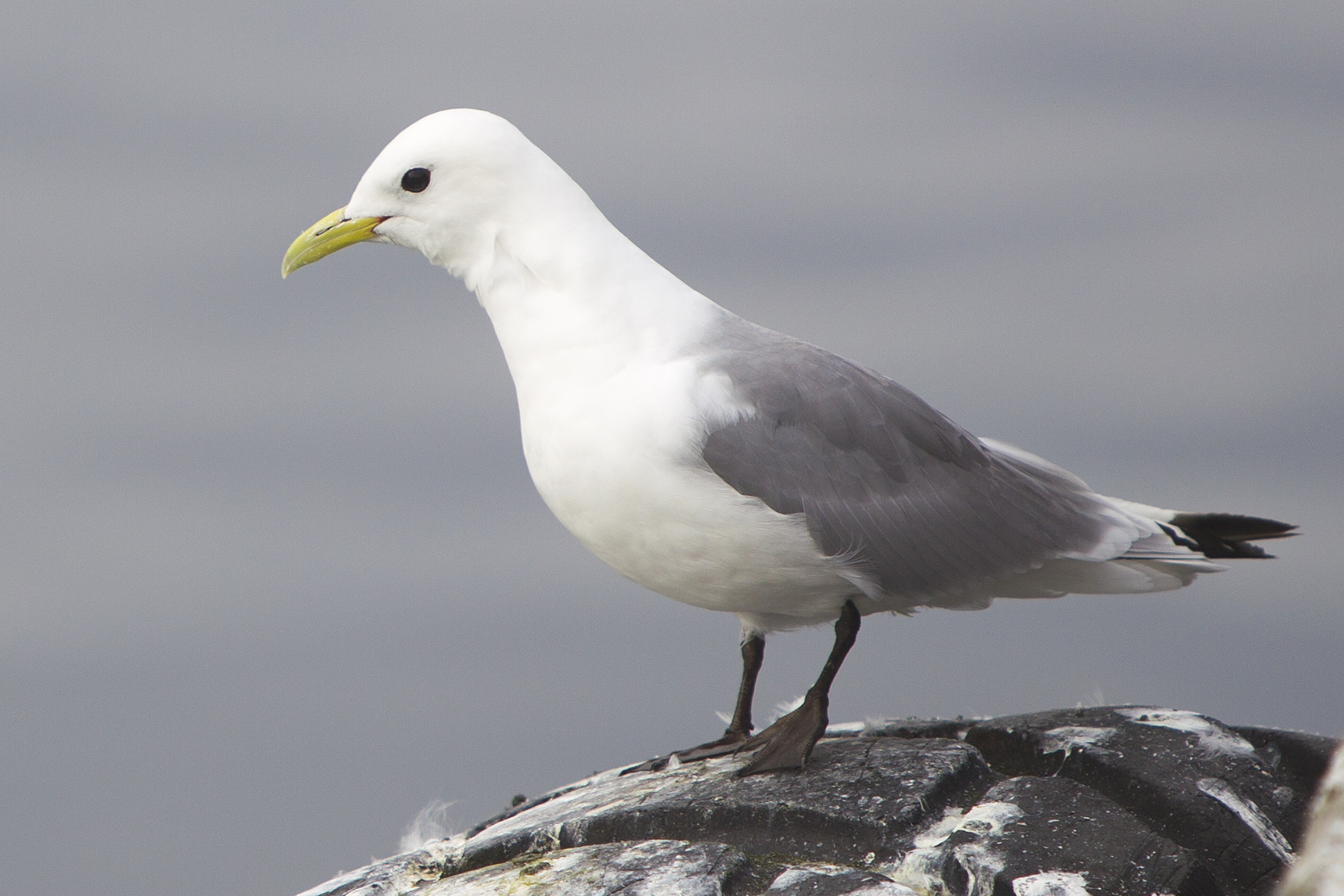
- Adult black-legged kittiwake in Vardø, Norway

Conservation status
- Vulnerable (IUCN 3.1)

Scientific classification
- Kingdom: Animalia
- Phylum: Chordata
- Class: Aves
- Order: Charadriiformes
- Family: Laridae
- Genus: Rissa
- Species: R. tridactyla

Binomial name
- Rissa tridactyla (Linnaeus, 1758)
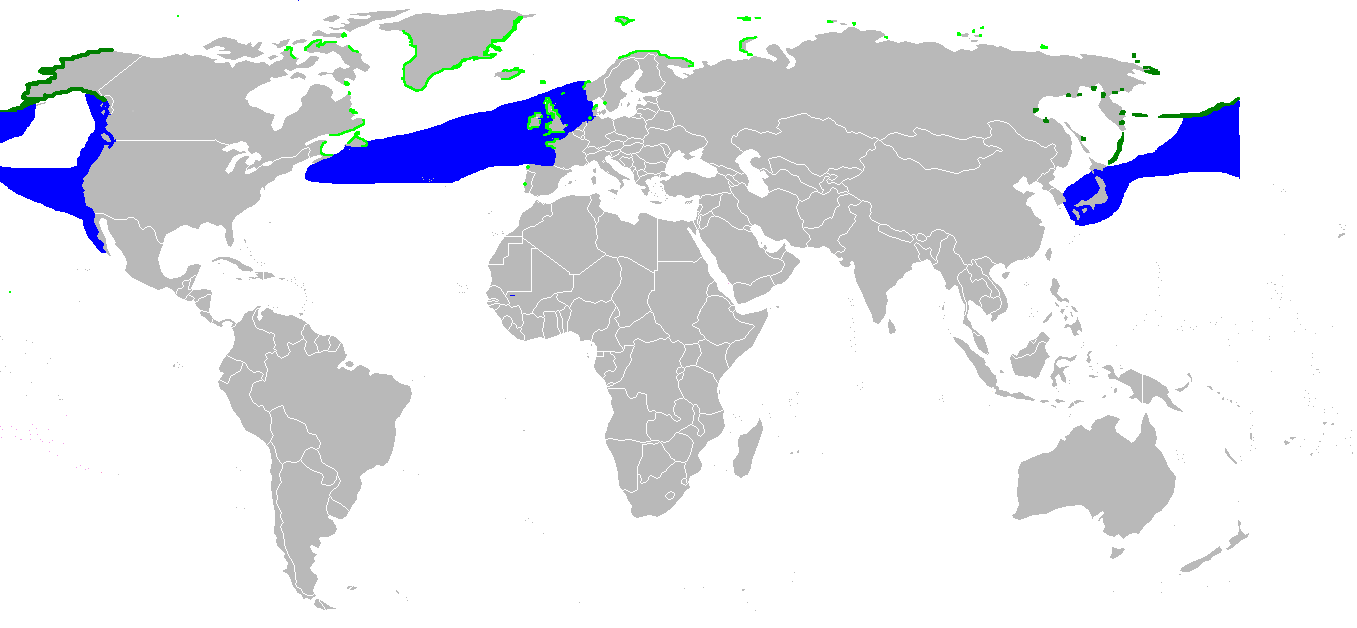
- Range of R. tridactyla Summer range Wintering range

Synonyms
- Larus tridactylus Linnaeus, 1758; Larus rissa Linnaeus, 1766

Audio
- Calls, recorded on Skomer

= Black-legged kittiwake =

Species of bird

The black-legged kittiwake (Rissa tridactyla) is a seabird species in the gull family Laridae. This species was first described by Carl Linnaeus in his landmark 1758 10th edition of Systema Naturae as Larus tridactylus. The English name is derived from its call, a shrill 'kittee-wa-aaake, kitte-wa-aaake'. In North America, this species is known as the black-legged kittiwake to differentiate it from the red-legged kittiwake, but in Europe, where it is the only member of the genus, it is often known just as kittiwake.

== Taxonomy ==
The black-legged kittiwake was formally described in 1758 by the Swedish naturalist Carl Linnaeus in the tenth edition of his Systema Naturae. He placed with the gulls in the genus Larus and coined the binomial name Larus tridactylus. Linnaeus specified the type location as northern Europe but this has been restricted to Great Britain. The black-legged kittiwake is now placed together with the red-legged kittiwake in the genus Rissa that was introduced in 1826 by the English naturalist James Stephens. The genus name is from the Icelandic word "rita" for a black-legged kittiwake. The specific tridactyla is from Ancient Greek tridaktulos meaning "three-toed". The English name "kittiwake" is derived from its call, a shrill 'kittee-wa-aaake, kitte-wa-aaake'.

=== Subspecies ===
Two subspecies are recognised. These are listed below together with their breeding ranges.

- R. t. tridactyla (Linnaeus, 1758): North Atlantic Ocean, from high Arctic to temperate coasts, in Greenland, Iceland, west and northwest Europe, Svalbard and northwest New Siberian Islands, the Canadian high Arctic (northeast Canada), Gulf of St. Lawrence and Newfoundland (southeast Canada). Unique among the Laridae in having only a very small or even no hind toe.
- R. t. pollicaris Ridgway, 1884: North Pacific Ocean, from high Arctic to temperate north coasts, from the northeast New Siberian Islands to Sakhalin, Kamchatka Peninsula, Kuril and Commander Islands (east Russia), the Aleutian Islands and Bering Sea islands, and west and southwest Alaska mainland. Hind toe (as the name pollex, meaning thumb, suggests) present.

Apart from the hind toe, the two subspecies are almost identical, R. tridactyla pollicaris is in general slightly larger than R. tridactyla tridactyla.

== Distribution and habitat ==
The black-legged kittiwake is a coastal bird of the arctic to subarctic regions of the world. It can be found all across the northern coasts of the Atlantic, from Canada to Greenland as well as on the Pacific side from Alaska to the coast of Siberia. Black-legged kittiwakes' wintering range extends further south from the St-Lawrence to the southern coast of New Jersey as well as in China, the Sargasso sea and off the coast of west Africa. There are two subspecies of black-legged kittiwake: R. t. tridactyla can be found on the Atlantic coast whereas R. t. pollicaris is found on the Pacific coast.

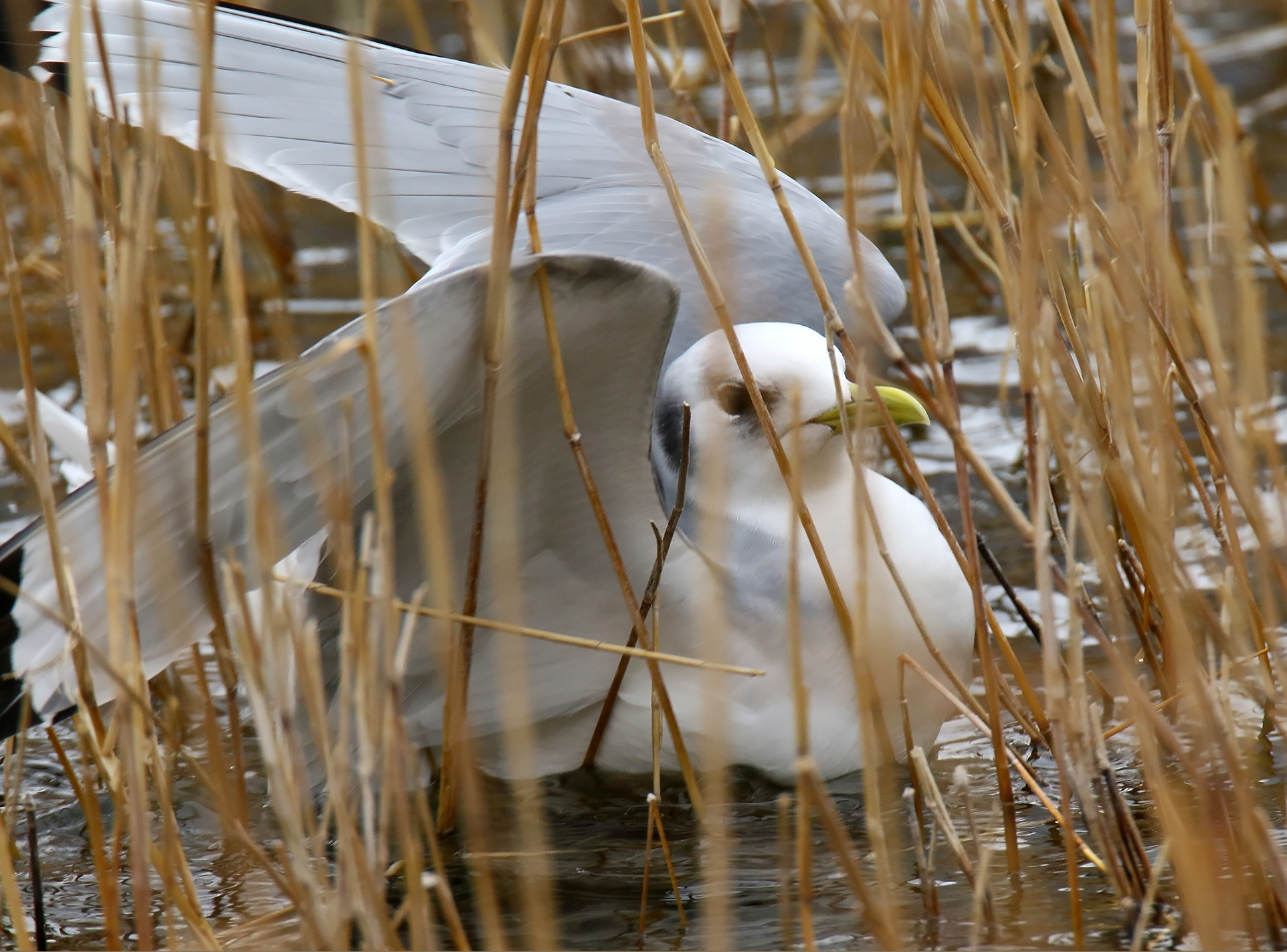
A vagrant kittiwake at Borith Lake, high in the Karakoram mountains of northern Pakistan, over 1,400 km from the Indian Ocean and over 5,000 km overland from the nearest breeding colonies

Out of all the gulls, the kittiwakes are the most pelagic ones, except for perhaps Sabine's gull. Kittiwakes are almost exclusively found at sea with the exception of the breeding period, from May to September, where they can be found nesting on the sheerest sea cliffs. They are rarely found inland, though occasional vagrants can turn up far inland, even in central Asia well over a thousand km from the sea. For the rest of the year, kittiwake spend most of their time on the wing out of sight from the coast.

== Description ==
=== Adult plumage ===
The adult is 37–41 cm (15–16 in) in length with a wingspan of 91–105 cm (36–41 in) and a body mass of 305–525 g (10.8–18.5 oz). It has a white head and body, grey back, grey wings tipped solid black, black legs and a yellow bill. Occasional individuals have pinky-grey to reddish legs, inviting confusion with red-legged kittiwake. The inside of their mouth is also a characteristic feature of the species due to its rich red colour. Such red pigmentation is due to carotenoids pigments and vitamin A which have to be acquired through their diet. Studies show that integument colour is associated with male's reproductive success. This hypothesis would explain the behaviour of couples greeting each other by opening their mouth and flashing their bright mouth it to their partner while calling. As their Latin name suggests, they only possess three toes since their hind toe is either extremely reduced or completely absent. In winter, the species acquires a dark grey smudge behind the eye and a grey hind-neck collar. The bill also turns a dusky-olive colour.

Kittiwakes are similar to most other gulls in their moulting pattern with one full moult and one partial moult each year. The full moult from summer to winter plumage though is very protracted, beginning as early as late May or June, and continuing through summer until completed by October, or rarely as late as the end of the year. Then in early spring, there is a partial moult (head and body feathers, but not the wing or tail feathers) from winter plumage to summer plumage in March to early April.

=== Juvenile plumage ===
At fledging, the juveniles differ from the adults in having a black 'W' band across the length of the wings and whiter secondary and primary feathers behind the black 'W', a black hind-neck collar and a black terminal band on the tail. They can also be identified due to their solid black bill. This plumage is a hatch-year plumage and will only remain for their first year. Kittiwakes obtain their mature plumage at 4 years old, but will gradually change their juvenile plumage over time until maturity is reached. A second-year juvenile resembles a hatch-year regarding the plumage, though the bill is no longer solid black but instead has a greenish colour. The black marking on the coverts and the tail is still visible. The black marking will only moult during their third year, where the black is no longer present on the coverts, but the grey smudge on the head remains. A third-year bird will also exhibit a small zone of bright yellow/orange at the base of its mostly greenish bill. It is only at four years old that the bill will reach an overall colour of bright yellow and complete its mature plumage.

The old fisherman's name of "tarrock" for juvenile kittiwakes is still occasionally used.

Standard measurements
length	410–460 mm (16–18 in)
weight	400 g (14 oz)
wingspan	910 mm (36 in)
wing	295–322 mm (11.6–12.7 in)
tail	124–136 mm (4.9–5.4 in)
culmen	33–39 mm (1.3–1.5 in)
tarsus	32–36 mm (1.3–1.4 in)

=== Calls ===
Sound of kittiwake

The kittiwake is named after its call that resembles a long "kit-ti-wake". Apart from their typical call, kittiwakes have a wide array of calls. Their greeting call is used by the two members of a pair when meeting at the nest after an absence of one or both members. Before and during copulation, the female will often call by making a series of short high pitched "squeak". This call is also used by the female to beg for food from the male (courtship feeding). When predators are around, the kittiwake alarm call, an "oh oh oh oh" will be heard all across the colony. Kittiwake will call all day for various reasons and will only stop when the sun is down.

=== Similar species ===
The red-legged kittiwake is the only other species in the genus Rissa and can be differentiated from its counterpart by its red legs, as the name suggests. The head of the red-legged kittiwake is slightly smaller and bears a shorter bill. The chicks of the Pacific black-legged kittiwake and red-legged kittiwake cannot be distinguished during their youngest downy phase.

Juvenile black-legged kittiwakes can be confused with juvenile little gull and both juvenile and adult Sabine's gull, although the kittiwakes' plumage has broader black 'W' on the wing, the primaries and a different pattern going across the coverts.

== Behaviour and ecology ==
=== Flight ===
Kittiwake are known for their graceful flight. Unlike larger gulls, their flight is light with the wings beating in fast strokes. When looking at them flying around the colony, kittiwakes often look as if they are playing in the wind with their agile flips and loops. Kittiwakes are highly gregarious and therefore are rarely seen flying alone far away from the colony.

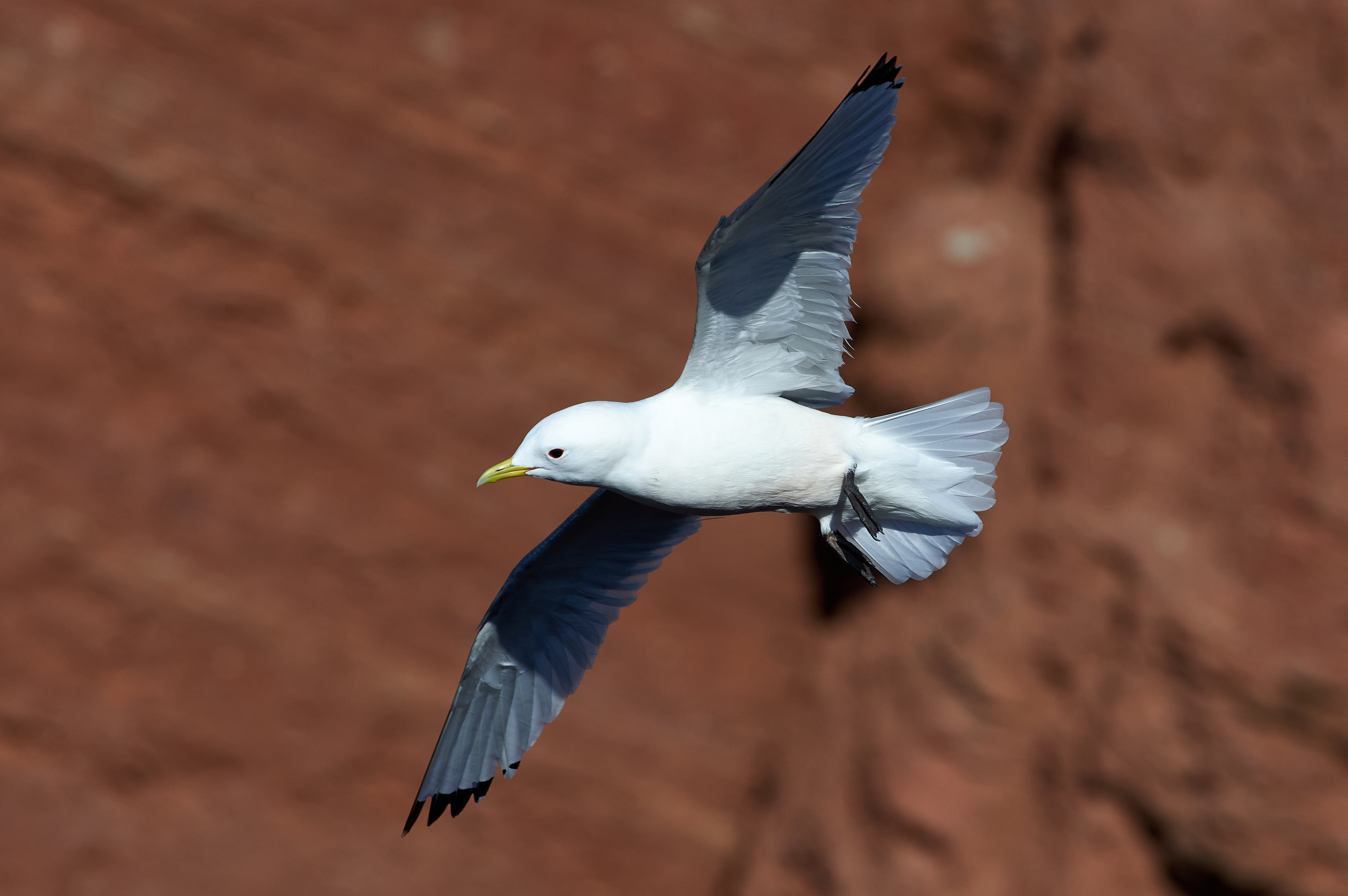
adult in breeding plumage

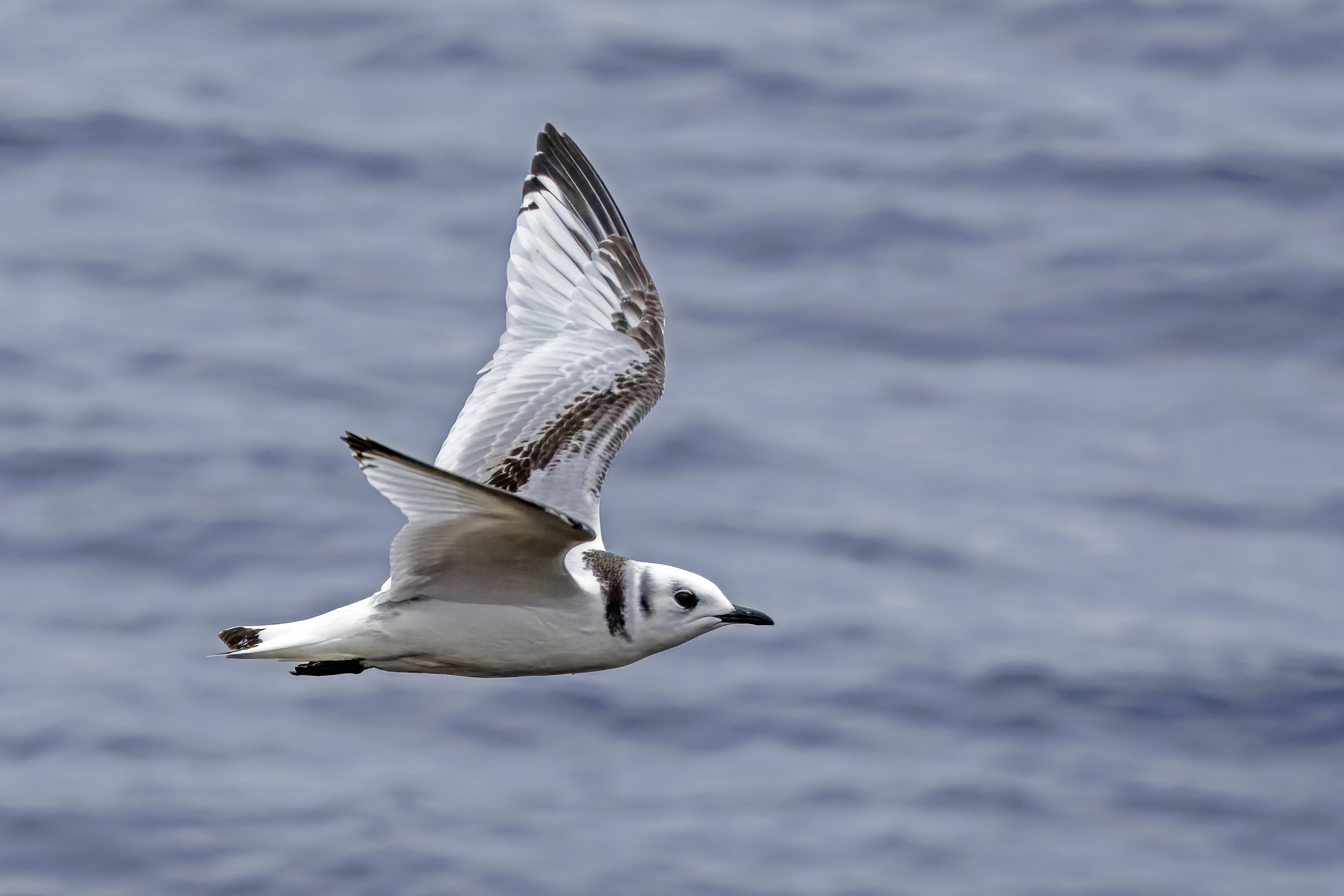
immature

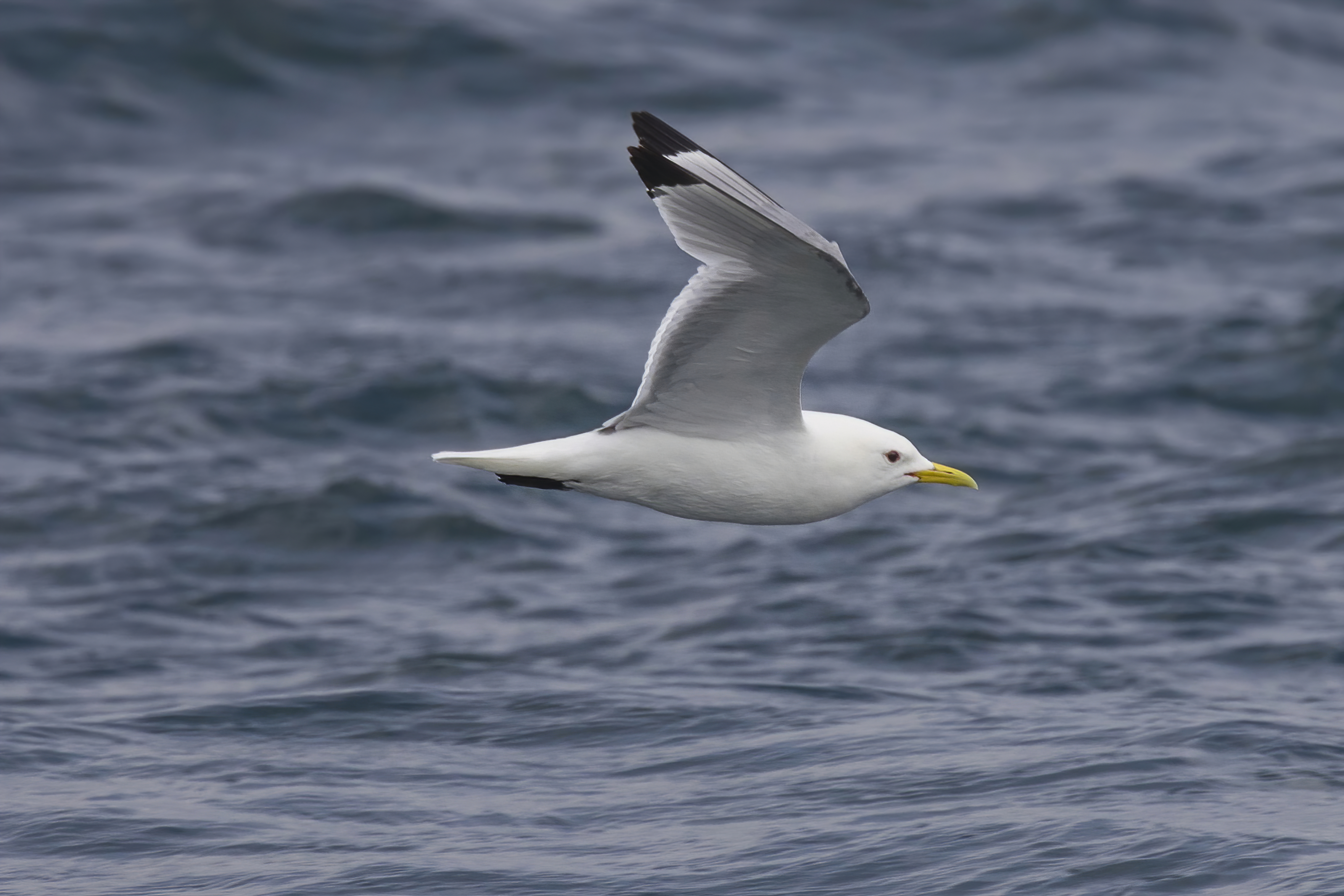
adult

=== Breeding ===
It is a coastal breeding bird around the north Pacific and north Atlantic oceans, found most commonly in North America and Europe. Kittiwakes are colonial nesters that form monogamous pairs and exhibit biparental care, meaning that both take part in nest building, incubation and chick rearing. They tend to nest in large numbers on cliffs by the sea side. It breeds in large colonies on cliffs and is very noisy on the breeding ground. Cliff nesting for gulls occurs only in the Rissa species, and the kittiwake is capable of utilizing the very sheerest of vertical cliffs, as is evident in their nesting sites on Staple Island in the outer Farne Islands.

Black-legged kittiwake gulls traditionally preferred nesting on natural cliffs and ledges, and there are historically few instances of kittiwakes nesting on man-made structures. The first nesting on buildings on the River Tyne in Northumberland, England, began in 1949 at North Shields and then colonised further upstream, with nesting on buildings in central Newcastle upon Tyne and Gateshead from the early 1960s; by 2020, 1,639 pairs were nesting on buildings along the Tyne (of which 879 pairs on the iconic Tyne Bridge in the heart of Newcastle), with the furthest inland 17 km upriver from the sea. In recent years, some have even been nesting successfully on top of street lights on Newcastle's Quayside. A shift in nesting behaviour has also been noted in the coastal areas of Northern Norway.

==== Nesting ====
Kittiwake pairs both participate in building the nest in which the female will lay their eggs. The breeding season begins with nest refurbishment in late March or early April, and egg-laying from late April, and usually ends in August. Building the nest in order to welcome their fragile eggs is a tedious task and requires time and energy. The parents begin with a layer of mud and grass in order to form a platform that will cushion and help to isolate the eggs from the cold ground. A cup is then built around the platform in order to keep the eggs from rolling out of the nest. Finally, the nest is lined with soft and dry material such as moss, grass or seaweed. The nest is solidified by a continuous trampling of the materials by the pair. Throughout this period, the male will do courtship feeding by feeding the female at their nest site. The reasons for such behaviour are not quite understood but many hypotheses have been brought up to explain the phenomenon. Hypothesis such as the "nutrition hypothesis" and the "copulation enhancement hypothesis" have shown evidence that this behaviour evolved either through natural or sexual selection.

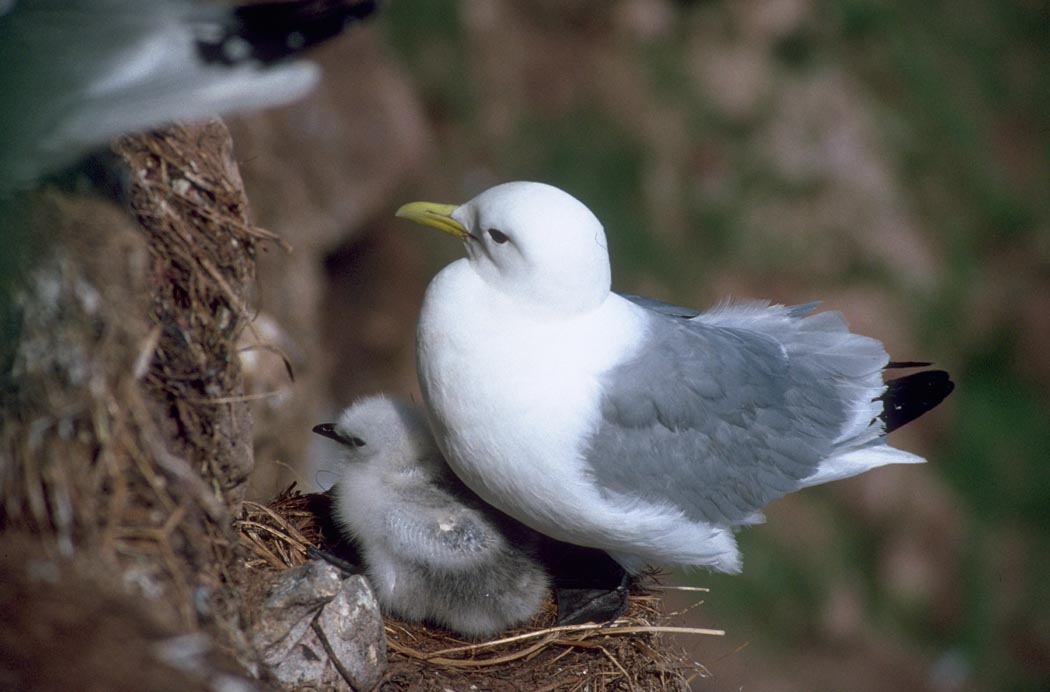
On nest with chick

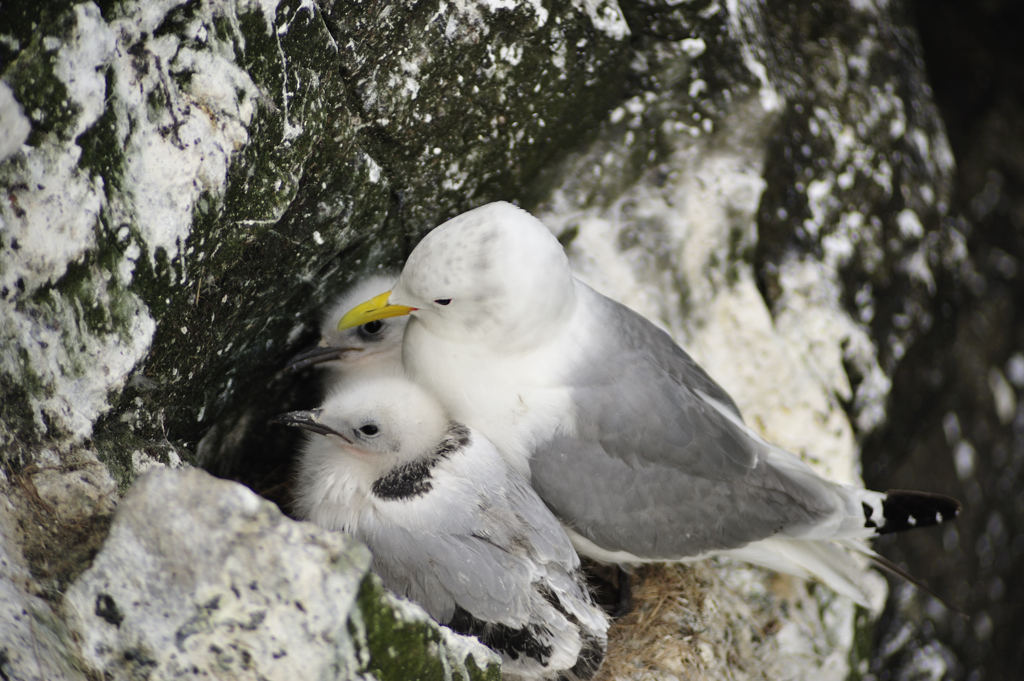
Adult and chicks

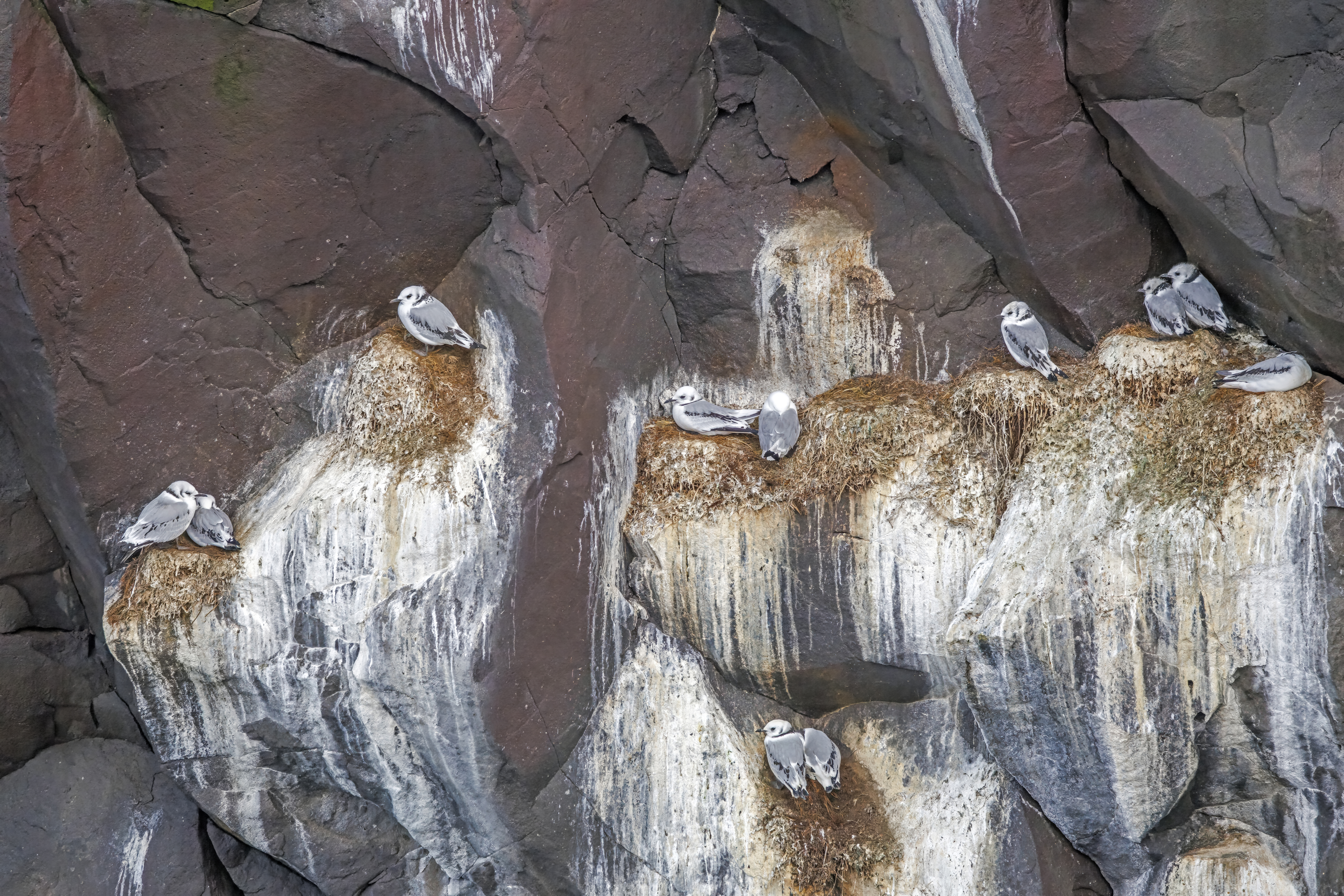
immatures on nests
Keflavíkurbjarg cliffs, Iceland

==== Eggs and incubation ====
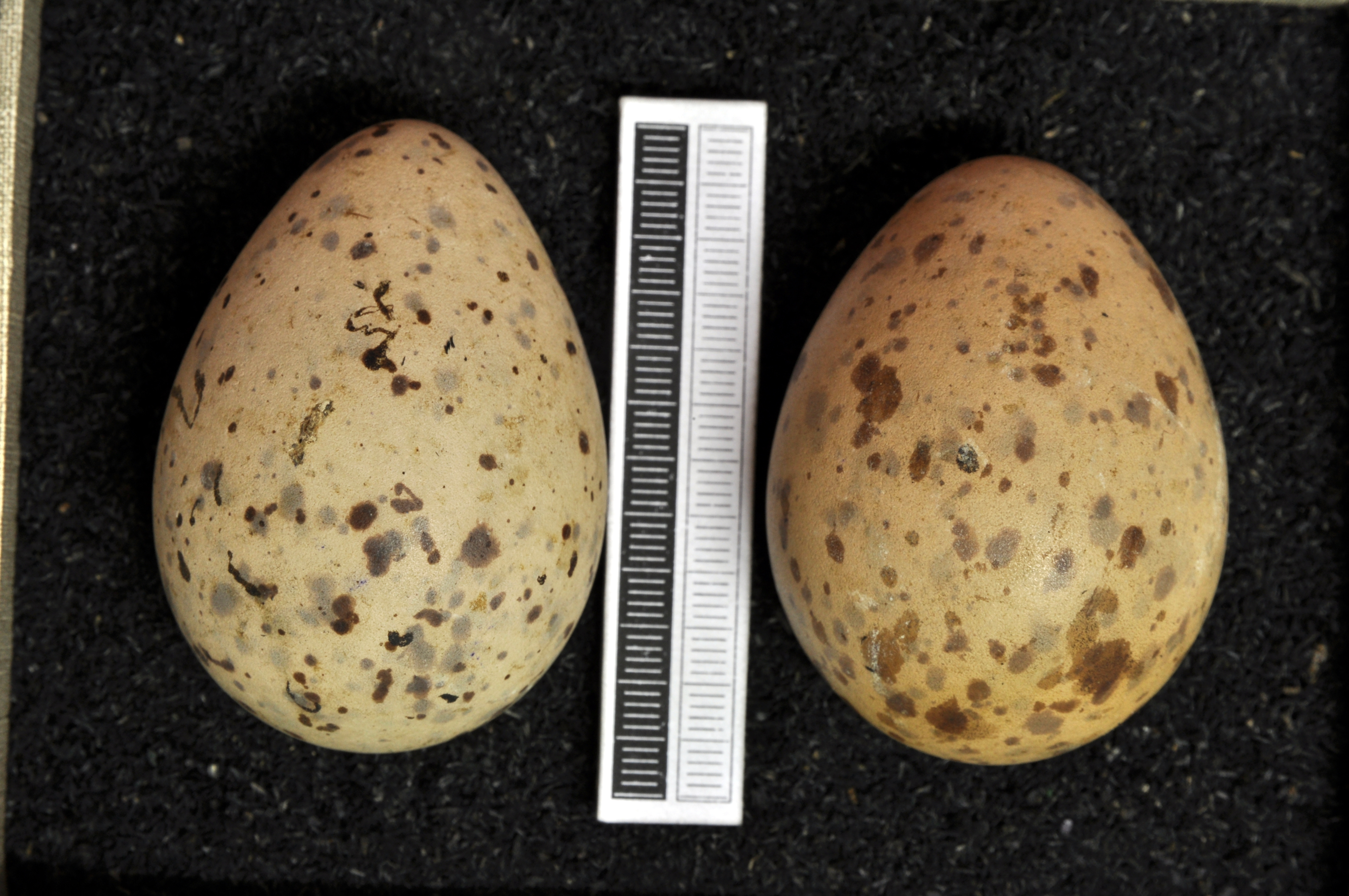
Eggs, Collection Museum Wiesbaden

Kittiwakes are single-brooded, meaning that the pair will only reproduce once per year. Egg formation within the female usually takes around 15 days and normal egg clutch size ranges from one to two sub-elliptical eggs, though three eggs clutches are not impossible. The female will lay eggs on alternate days. The egg colour is variable, ranging from white, brownish to turquoise with dark brown speckles. Once the eggs are laid, the parents will take turns and incubate their clutch for an average period of 27 days. In case of egg loss, the female might relay another egg within 15 days after the loss.

==== Chick-rearing ====
Chicks usually hatch through the larger end of the egg using their egg tooth. The egg tooth usually disappears after seven days post-hatching. The alpha and beta chicks tend to hatch 1.3 days apart. Kittiwake are born semi-precocial. The downy young of kittiwakes are white, since they have no need of camouflage from predators, and do not wander from the nest like Larus gulls for obvious safety reasons. Regardless of predation, the chicks are most vulnerable within their first week due to their incapacity to properly thermoregulate during that period. Kittiwake chicks also exhibit siblicide, meaning that the first-born chick may kill its sibling in order to avoid competition for food from their parents. If siblicide is to occur, it will most likely occur within the first 10 days of life of the smaller chick, in most cases the last born.

The downy plumage of chicks start to be replaced by the juvenile plumage only five days after hatching and will continue to do so for about 30 days, until the juvenile plumage is complete. It is not long after the completion of their juvenile plumage that the chicks will have their first flight at 34–58 days old. Chicks will come back to the nest for several weeks after hatching and will eventually follow the adults at sea where they spend the winter. Kittiwakes reach sexual maturity at around 4–5 years old.

=== Food and feeding ===
Kittiwakes are primarily pelagic piscivorous birds. Their main food source consists of fish, though it is not unlikely to find invertebrates such as copepods, polychete and squids in their diet, especially when fish is harder to find. Due to their wide range, kittiwake diet is quite variable. In the Gulf of Alaska, their diet is usually composed of Pacific capelin, Pacific herring, Pacific sand land and much more. Kittiwakes of the coast of the United Kingdom, in Europe, rely mostly on sandeels. In 2004, the kittiwake population in the Shetland islands, along with the murre (guillemot) and tern population, completely failed to reproduce successfully due to a collapse in sandeel stock. Like most gulls, kittiwake forage at the surface of the water where they tend to catch their prey while in flight or sitting on the water. Throughout winter, kittiwakes spend all of their time at sea where they forage. Unlike some gull species, they do not scavenge at landfills.

The foraging style of the kittiwakes is often compared to the terns' foraging strategy due to their frequent hovering and their head diving quickly at the surface of the water. Instances of kittiwakes following whales are also common since they benefit from the fish fragments expelled by these huge marine mammals. Fishers and commercial fishing boats are also the frequent witnesses of big groups of kittiwakes, often mixed with other gull species and terns, hovering around their ship in order to benefit from the scraps rejected in their sewage water or thrown overboard.

There are few studies focusing on their water needs, though they seem to prefer salt water to fresh water. Captive kittiwakes are known to refuse fresh water but will willingly drink salt water.

== Relationship with humans ==
Kittiwakes are a frequent encounter of fisheries in northern regions. Their diet consisting almost exclusively of fish, fishermen tend to seek large aggregation of seabirds since they are often a sign of fish abundance. On the other hand, kittiwake and other seabirds hang around fishing boats or platforms to collect scraps or any fish that might have been left out. Due to the pelagic lifestyle of kittiwakes, they rarely interact with humans on the land, other than occasional sight near the ocean's coast.

In New England, the black-legged kittiwake is often called the "winter gull" since its arrival often signals to people that winter is coming.

The city of Tromsø, along with other cities in the far north of Norway, has experienced a remarkable increase in the number of kittiwakes choosing to use city structures as nesting sites. This rise in urban nesting populations has seen the number of pairs increase from 13 in 2017 to over 380 in 2022. Researchers attribute this climate change related breeding failures, along with the absence of natural predators in the city, providing a safer environment for the gulls to breed and raise their young. The increasing nesting population has created challenges, as the gulls produce ammonia-smelling faeces, discolouring buildings and streets, as well as the noise pollution generated by their constant 'kittiwake' calling.

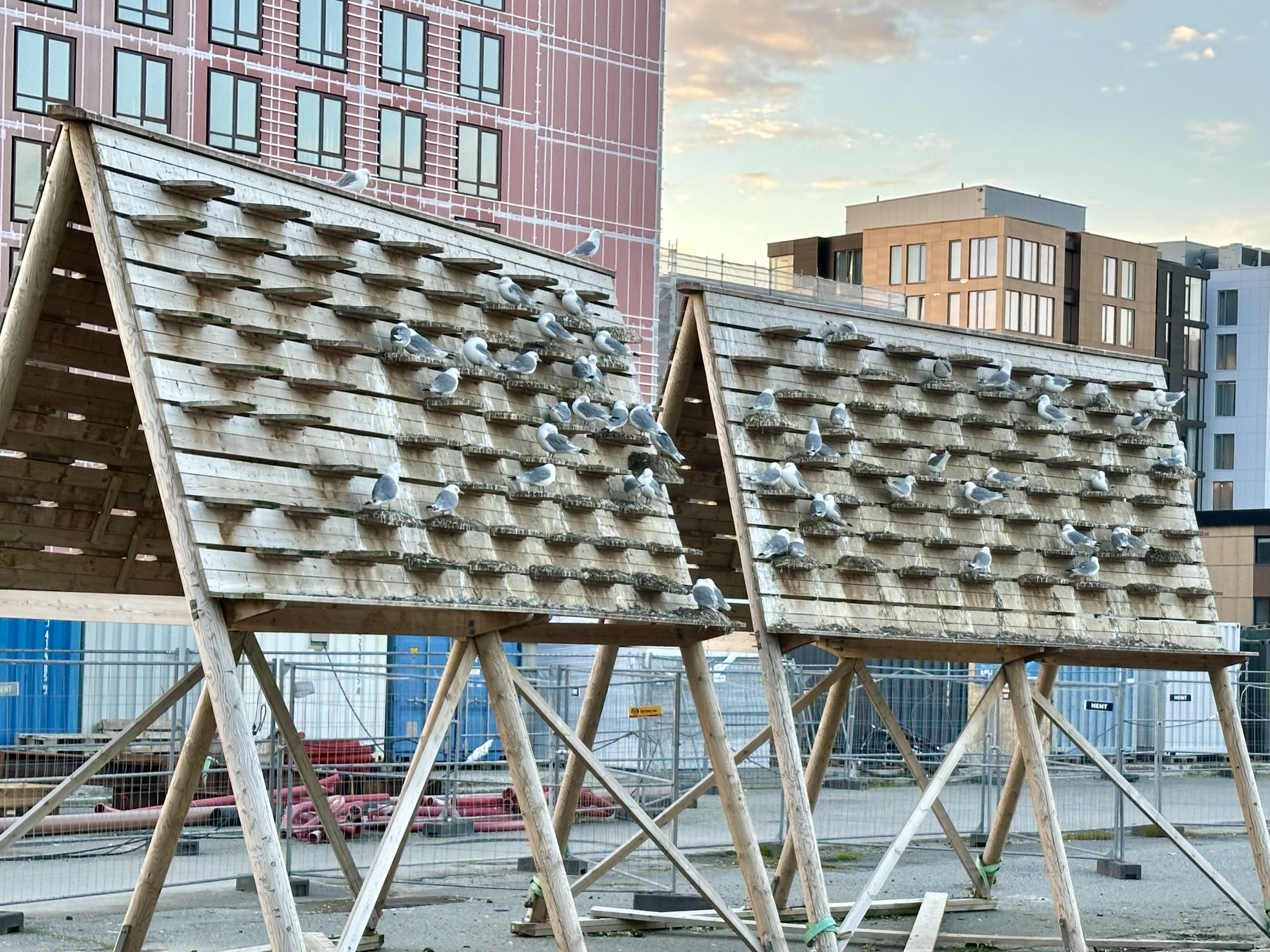
“Kittiwake Hotels” for Black-legged kittiwakes in Tromso, Norway

To address these challenges, innovative measures have been implemented in Tromsø. One such initiative involves the establishment of "Kittiwake hotels", artificial bird cliff structures built to encourage nesting away from urban facades. The hotels have, along with mitigation measures preventing nesting on the city's structures, had success in attracting kittiwakes without having a negative impact on breeding.

== Conservation ==
=== Population trends ===
Since the 1970s, it has been believed that the global population of black-legged kittiwake has declined of about 40% in only three generations (one generation is in average 12.9 years), putting the species in a dangerous place for the future. The global population is estimated at 14,600,000-15,700,000 individuals and is in constant decline. The individual distribution of kittiwakes across the world varies quite a bit, with Europe representing more than 50% of the world's kittiwake and North America representing only 20%. In their recent species assessment, the IUCN Red List pointed out that all but one populations of kittiwakes were in decline, with the exception of the small Canadian arctic population that seems to be increasing at a rate of 1% per year. The last IUCN Red List report in 2017, the species was moved from "least concern" to a "vulnerable" status on a global scale.

=== Threats ===
==== Fisheries ====
Since the kittiwakes are fish specialist and tend to rely on prey species, their reproductive success highly depends on fish availability. Commercial fisheries have been known to have many direct and indirect impacts on their surrounding ecosystem. Direct impacts on the fish species themselves are well known, but the presence of fisheries also has an array of impacts on marine predators that not only rely on the species harvested but also on the "bycatch" species. Fisheries harvesting species such as the sandeel, one of the main food source for kittiwakes in Europe, are known to have a huge impact of the reproductive success of local populations kittiwakes and other seabirds. Long-term research on the effect of food availability on kittiwakes in the Gulf of Alaska showed a direct correlation between food availability and reproductive success, using a supplemental-feeding experiment. Seabirds can also be a direct victim of fisheries. Their tendency to hang around them in hope of a good meal can lead to entanglements in fishing gear, often resulting in death by drowning.

==== Global warming ====
With global warming, the rising of ocean temperature is becoming a serious concern, affecting not only the marine flora and fauna but also the species exploiting the marine environment. Kittiwake are extremely sensitive to variation in food stocks. Such variations can be due to over exploitation, as mentioned above, but can also be due to variations in sea surface temperature. With the rising the sea surface temperature, many fishes, such as sandeels, are negatively affected by a rise in ocean temperature. Studies show that sandeels and many copepods populations are being negatively impacted due to increasing sea surface temperature. Such effect on marine species can have tremendous impact on breeding kittiwakes which rely almost exclusively on pelagic fishes, making food more scarce in a time of high energetic needs.

=== Conservation plan ===
There are still no global conservation plans for the black-legged kittiwake though the species is closely monitored for population trends shifts. There are currently no international legislations regarding this species. However, the black-legged kittiwake is protected under the Migratory Bird Treaty Act of 1918 that has been ratified by the US, Canada, Mexico, Russia and Japan. As for many gull species, the kittiwake is not a species of special interest for the public, therefore there are no education plans put in place in order to inform and educate people regarding this species.

== Gallery ==
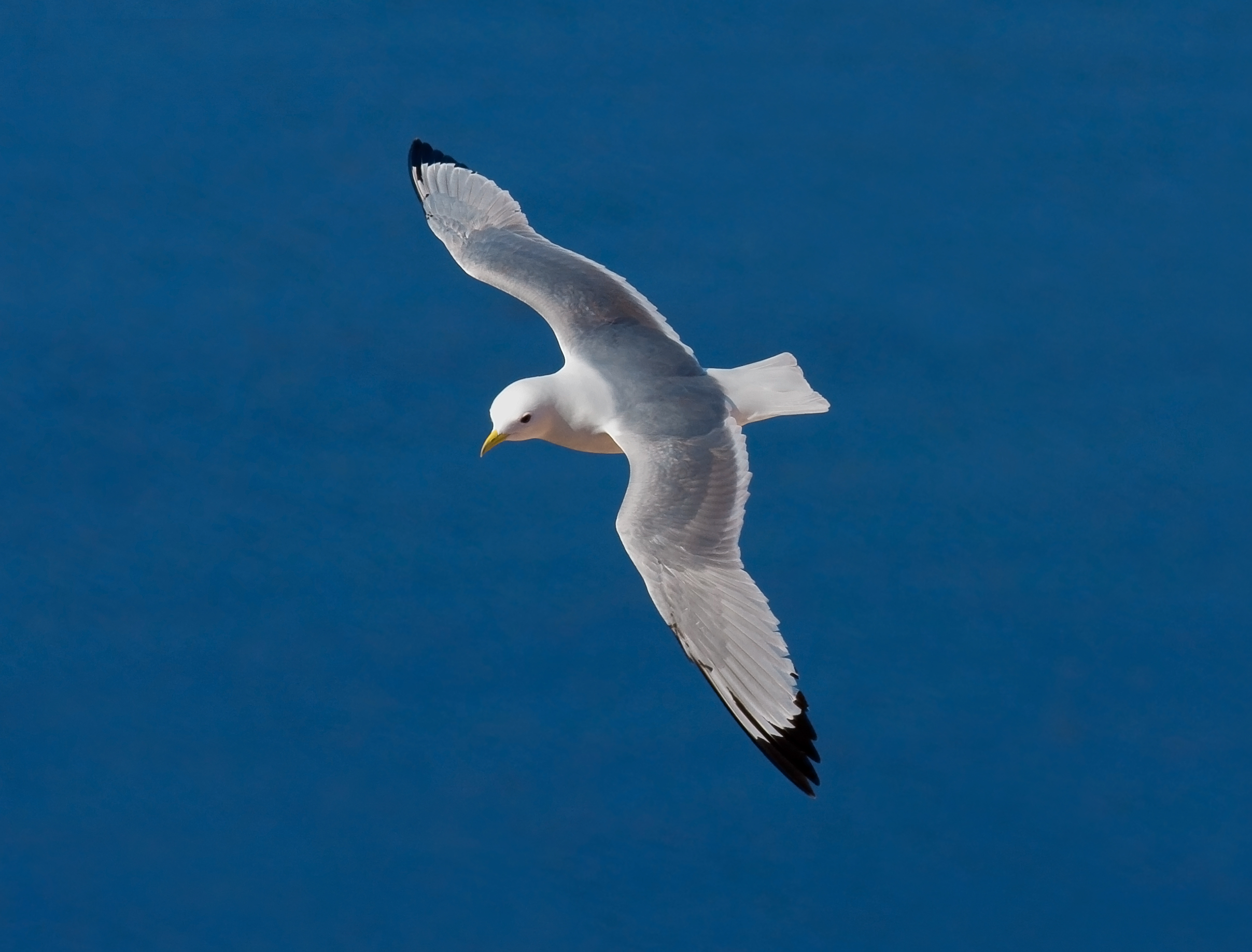
In flight, Heligoland, Germany

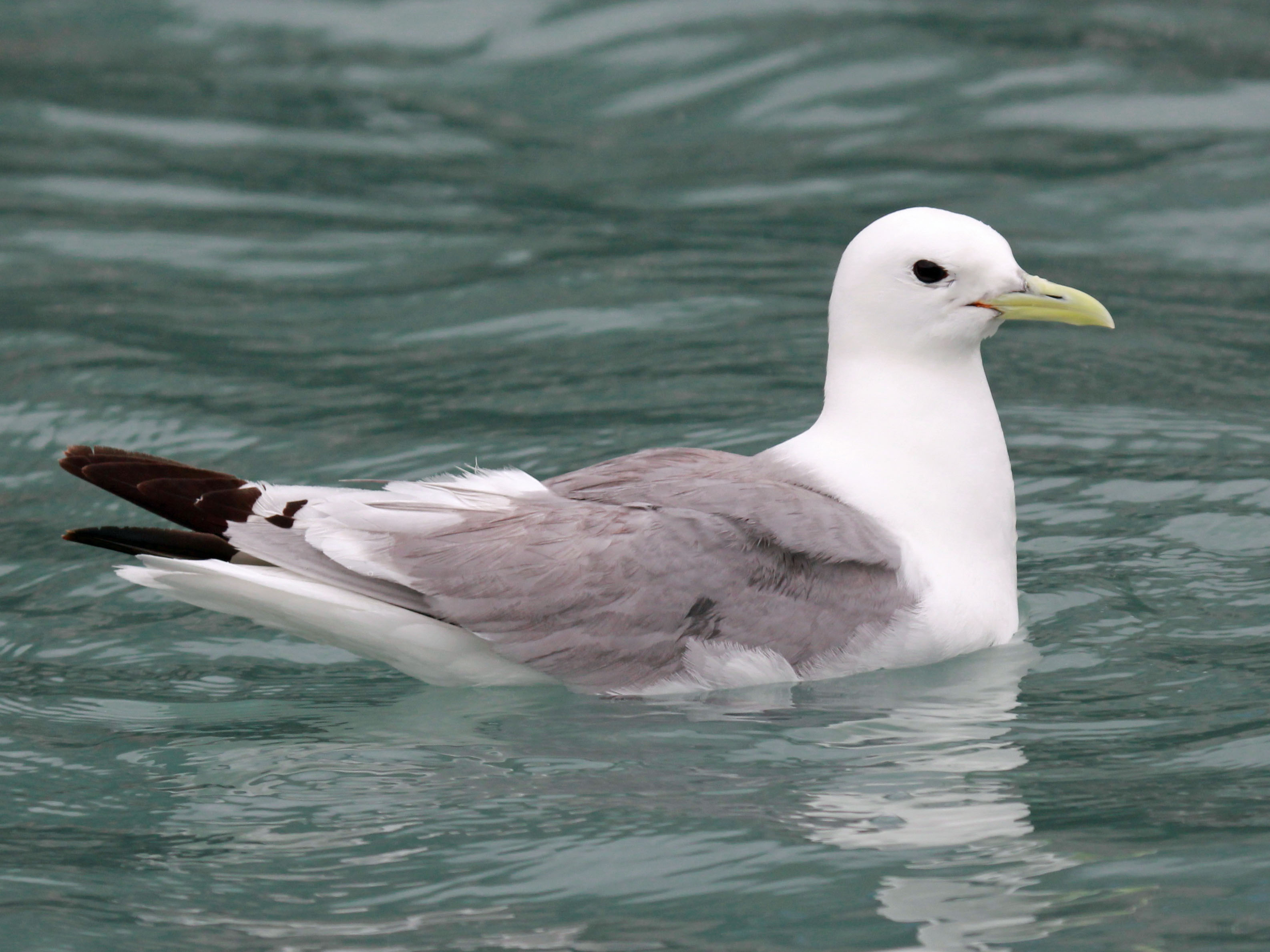
In Seward, Alaska

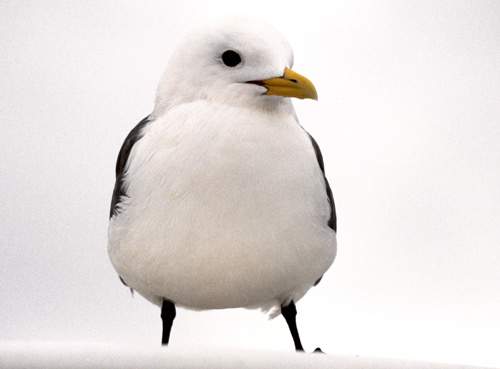

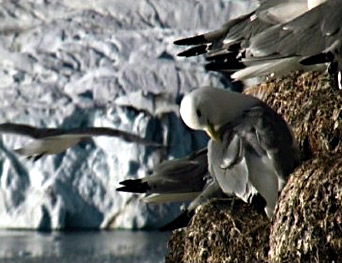
Colony at Svalbard

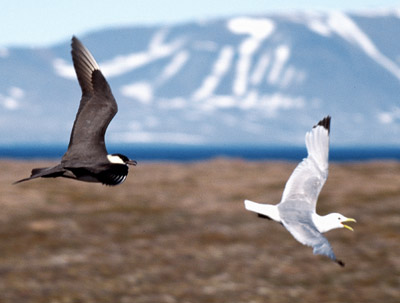
Chased by a parasitic jaeger at Svalbard

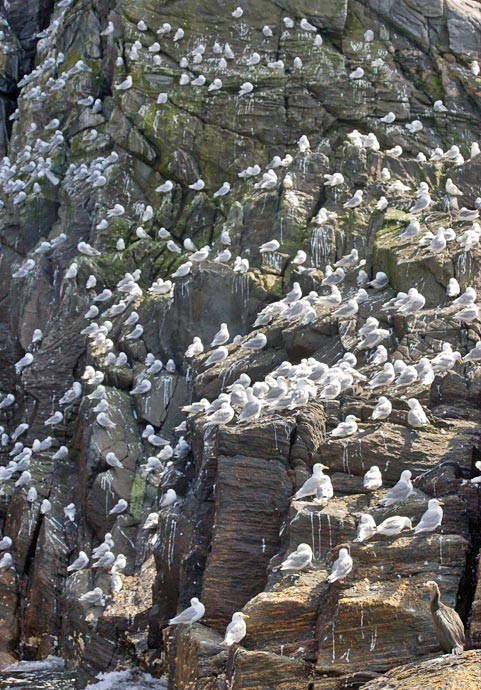
At the Norwegian bird-island Runde

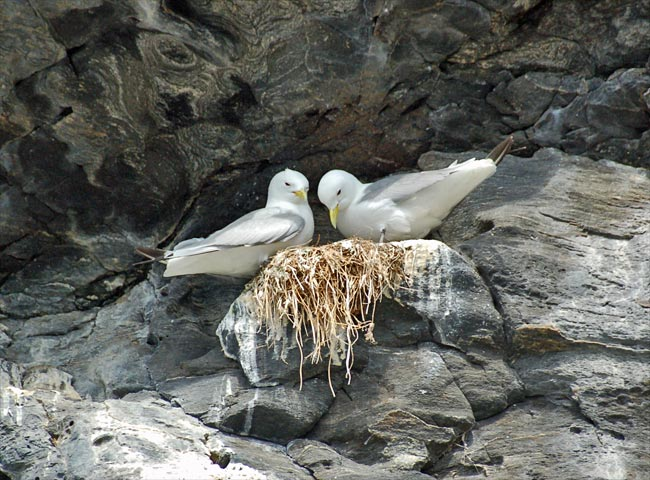
At Runde

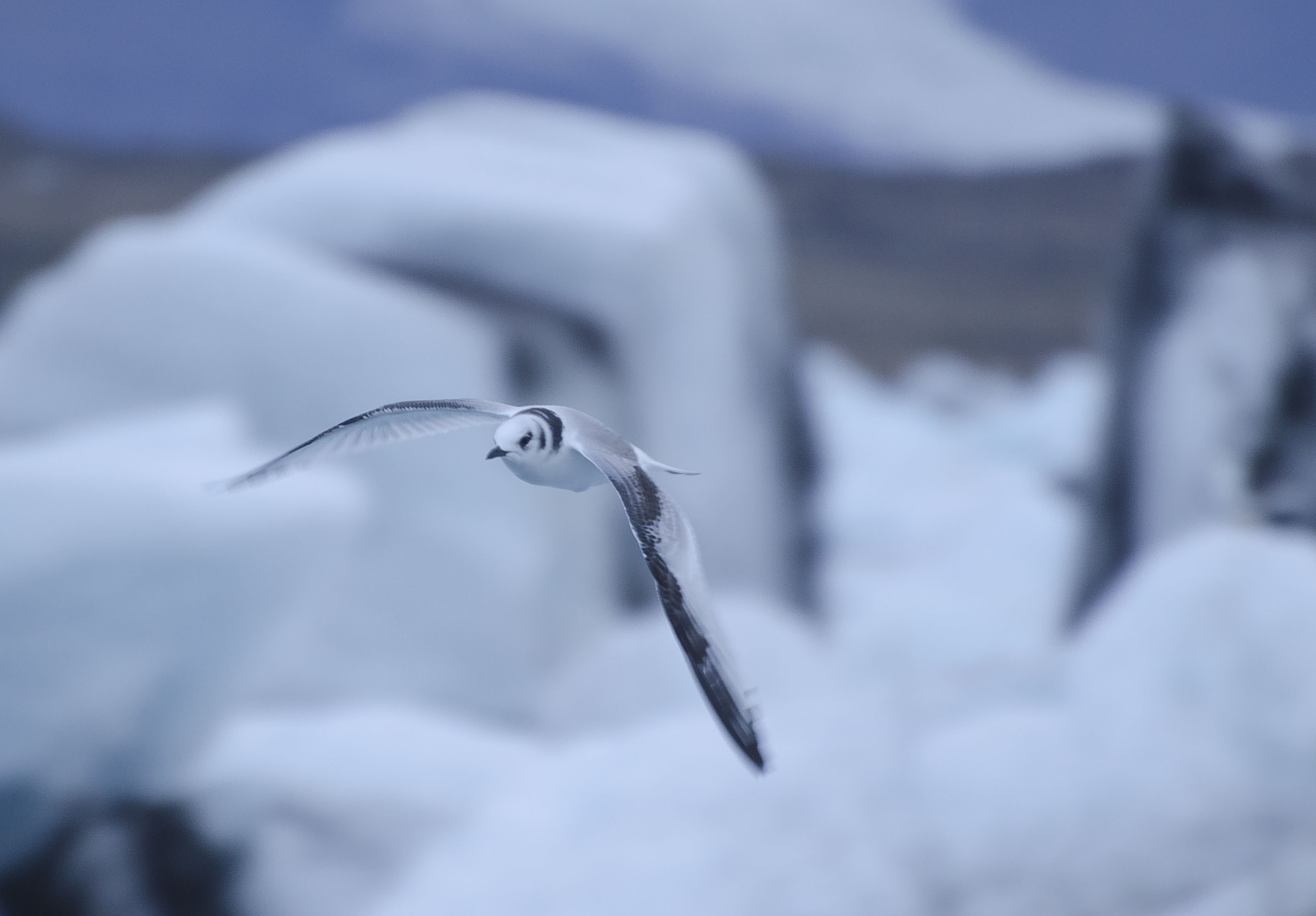
Youth (Iceland)

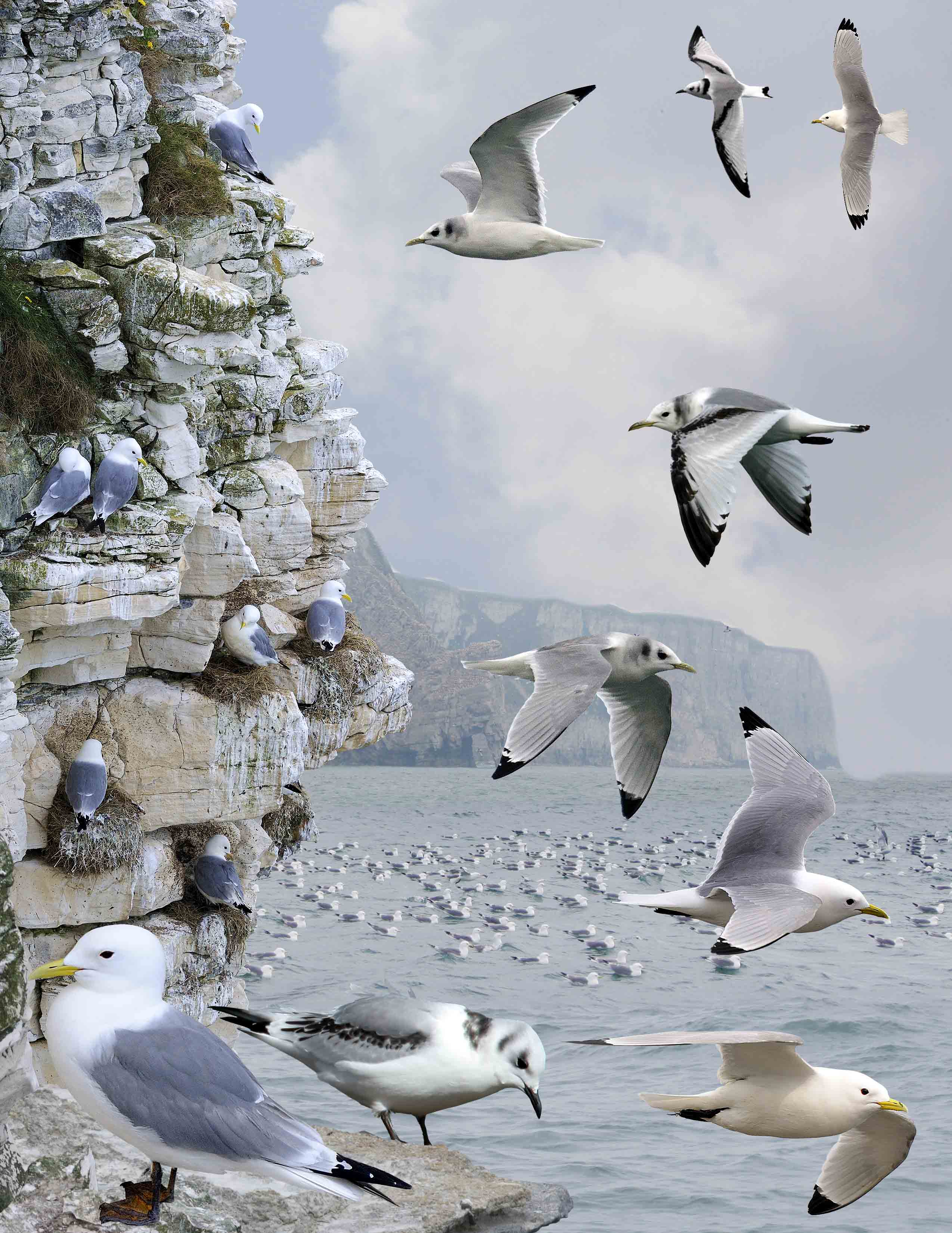
ID composite

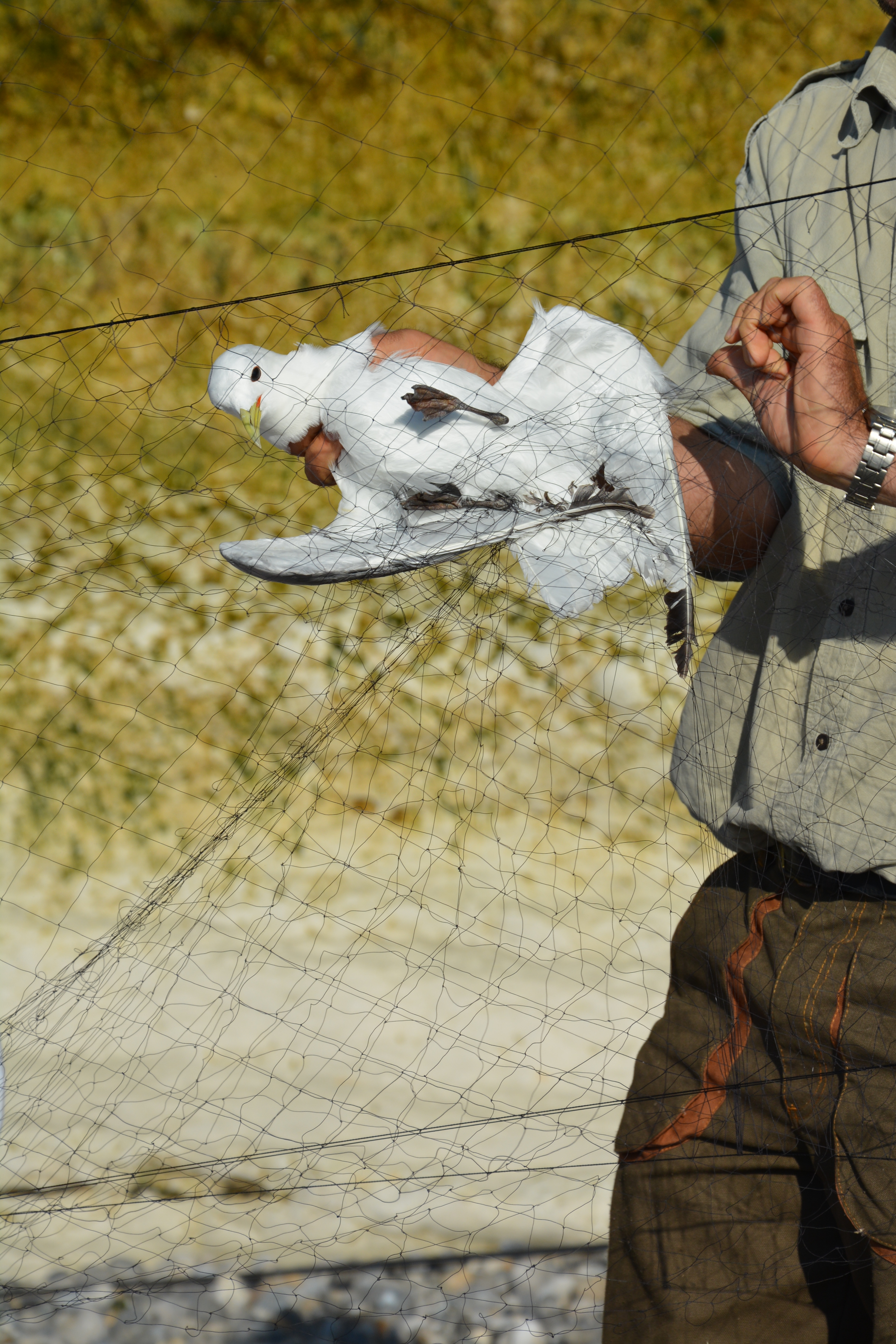
Capture of individuals for tagging
