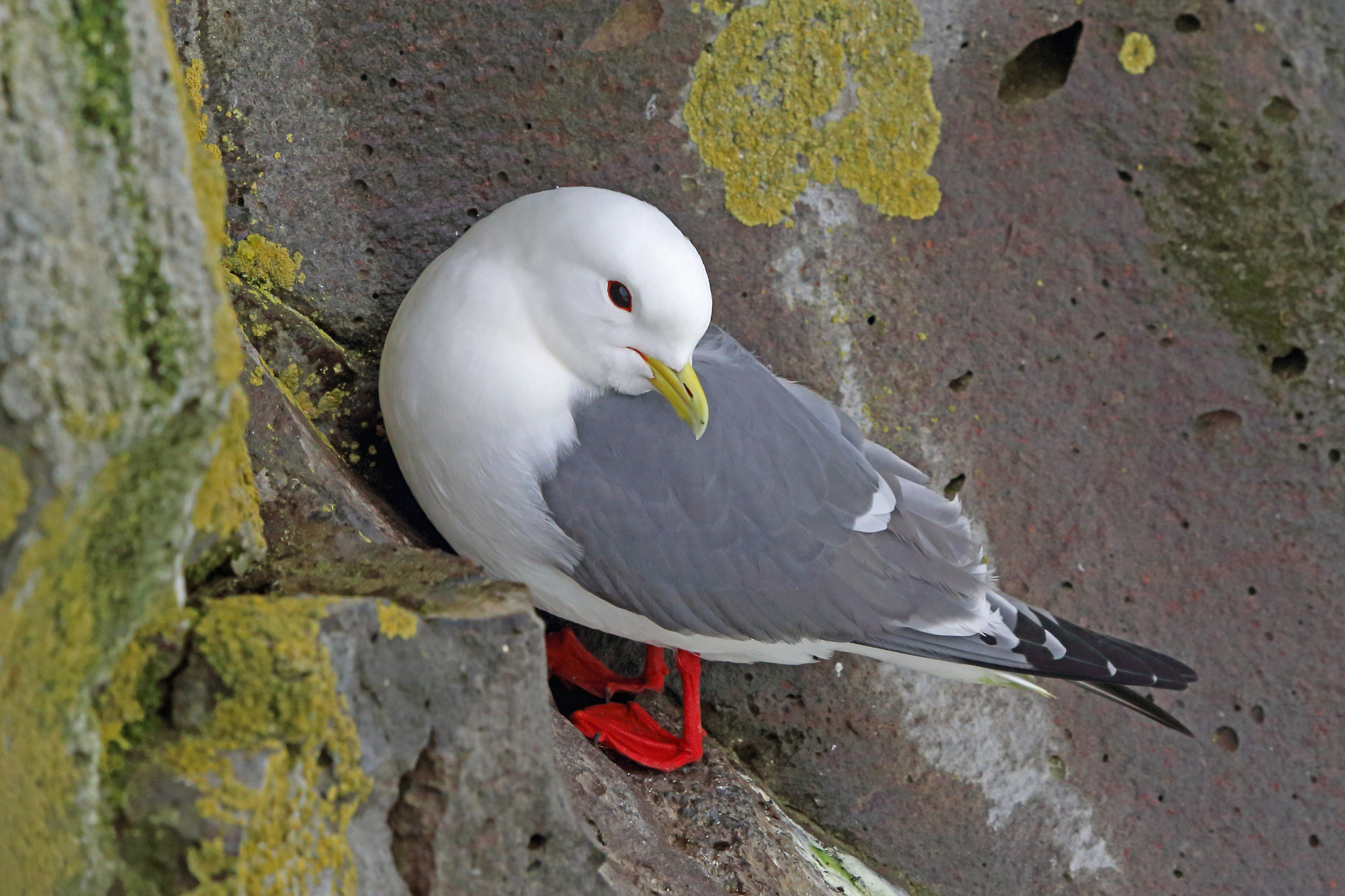
- Red-legged kittiwake, Saint Paul Island, Alaska

Conservation status
- Vulnerable (IUCN 3.1)

Scientific classification
- Kingdom: Animalia
- Phylum: Chordata
- Class: Aves
- Order: Charadriiformes
- Family: Laridae
- Genus: Rissa
- Species: R. brevirostris

Binomial name
- Rissa brevirostris (Bruch, 1855)
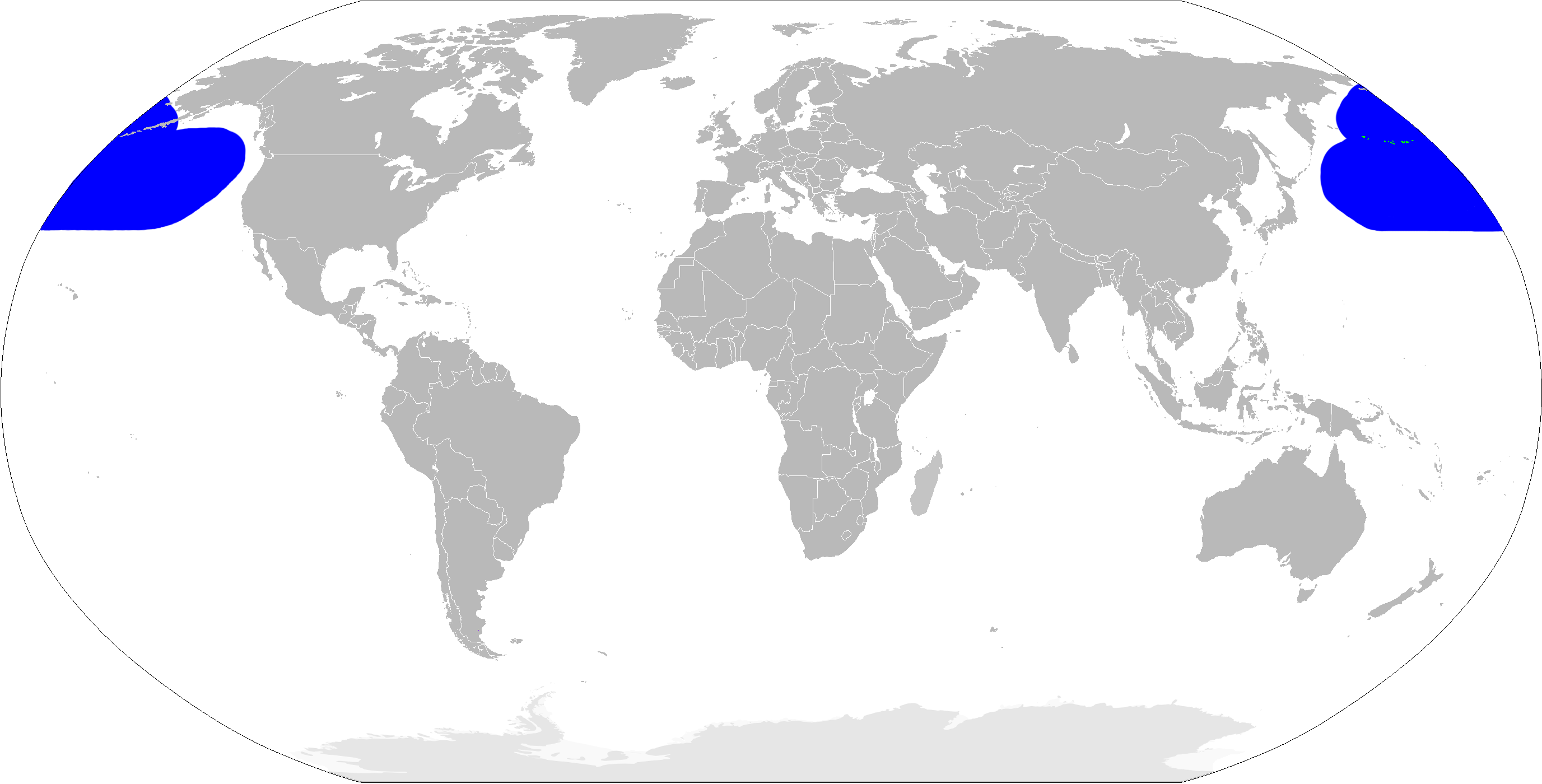

= Red-legged kittiwake =

Species of bird

The red-legged kittiwake (Rissa brevirostris) is a seabird species in the gull family Laridae. It breeds in the Pribilof Islands, Bogoslof Island, and Buldir Island in the Bering Sea off the coast of Alaska, and the Commander Islands, Russia, and spends the winter at sea.

== Description ==
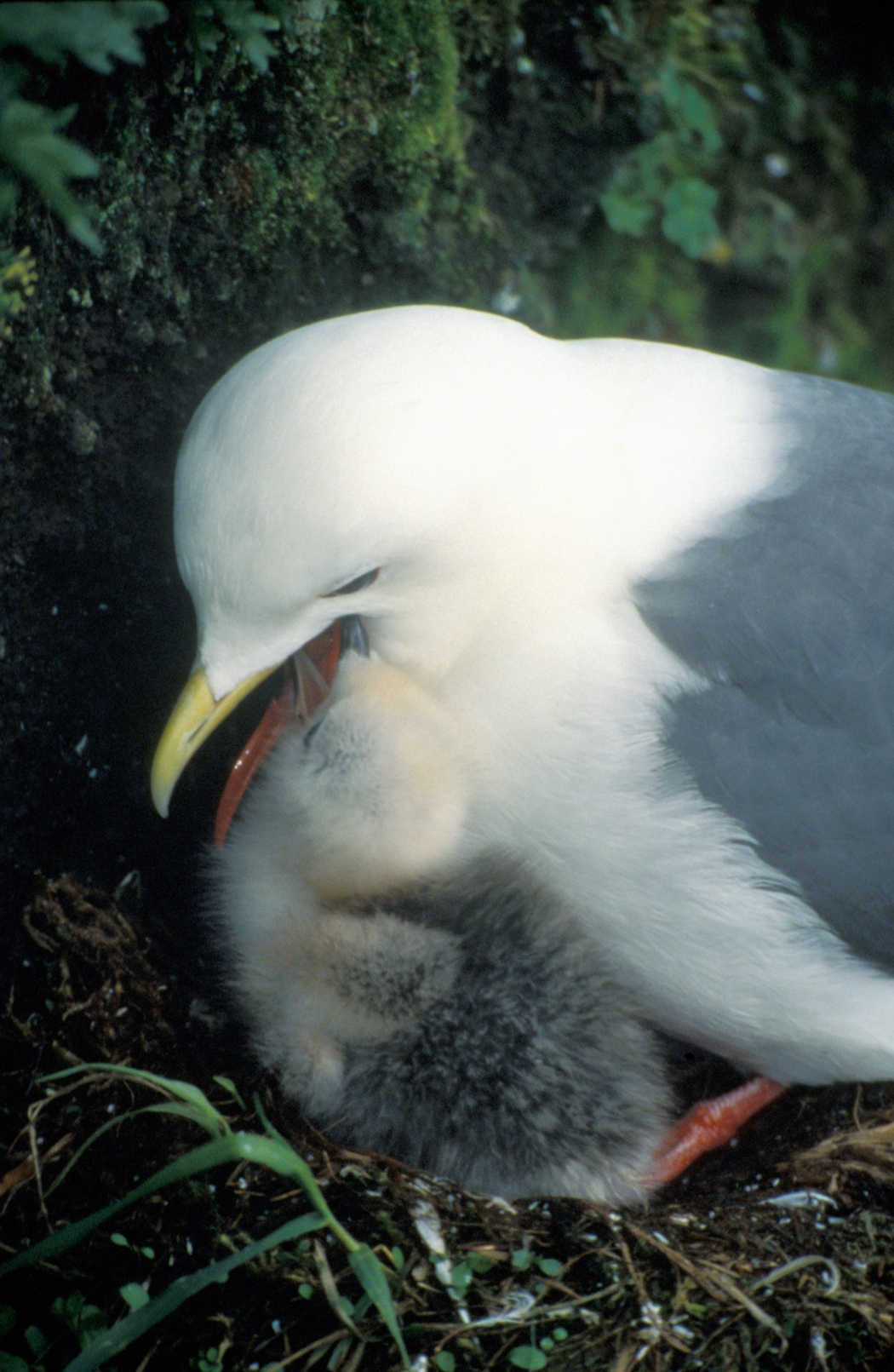
Red-legged kittiwake parent and chick

The red-legged kittiwake is a very localised subarctic Pacific species. Apart from the distinguishing feature implicit in its name, it is very similar to its better-known relative, the black-legged kittiwake; other differences include the shorter bill, larger eyes, a larger, rounder head, and darker gray wings, and in the juveniles, which barely differ from the adults, lacking the black tail band and "W" across the wings of juvenile black-legged kittiwakes. Juveniles take three years to reach maturity. Adults are 35–39 cm (14–15 in) long, with an 84–92 cm (33–36 in) wingspan and a weight of 325–510 g (11.5–18.0 oz).

Like the Pacific race of black-legged kittiwakes, the red-legged kittiwake has a well-developed hind toe. As occasional individual black-legged kittiwakes have reddish legs, any reports of red-legged away from the subarctic Pacific must record all of the other differences, not just the leg color, for acceptance by bird recording authorities.

== Behavior ==
The red-legged kittiwake feeds on fish such as lanternfish (Myctophidae), squid, and invertebrates. It spends the summer at the cliff breeding colonies, nesting on ledges, and migrates out to sea in September to overwinter in the northwestern Pacific Ocean and the Gulf of Alaska.

== Status ==
This species is listed as "vulnerable" by the IUCN, as its population appears to be in decline. It has a global population in the region of 337,000 to 377,000 mature individuals and its breeding range is 192,000 km^{2} (74,000 sq mi). Its numbers are thought to have decreased by about 35% between the mid-1970s and the mid-1990s though numbers may have stabilized since. Why they have declined is unclear, but may be related to a change in the availability of prey, possibly associated excessive commercial fishing or climate change.

== Gallery ==
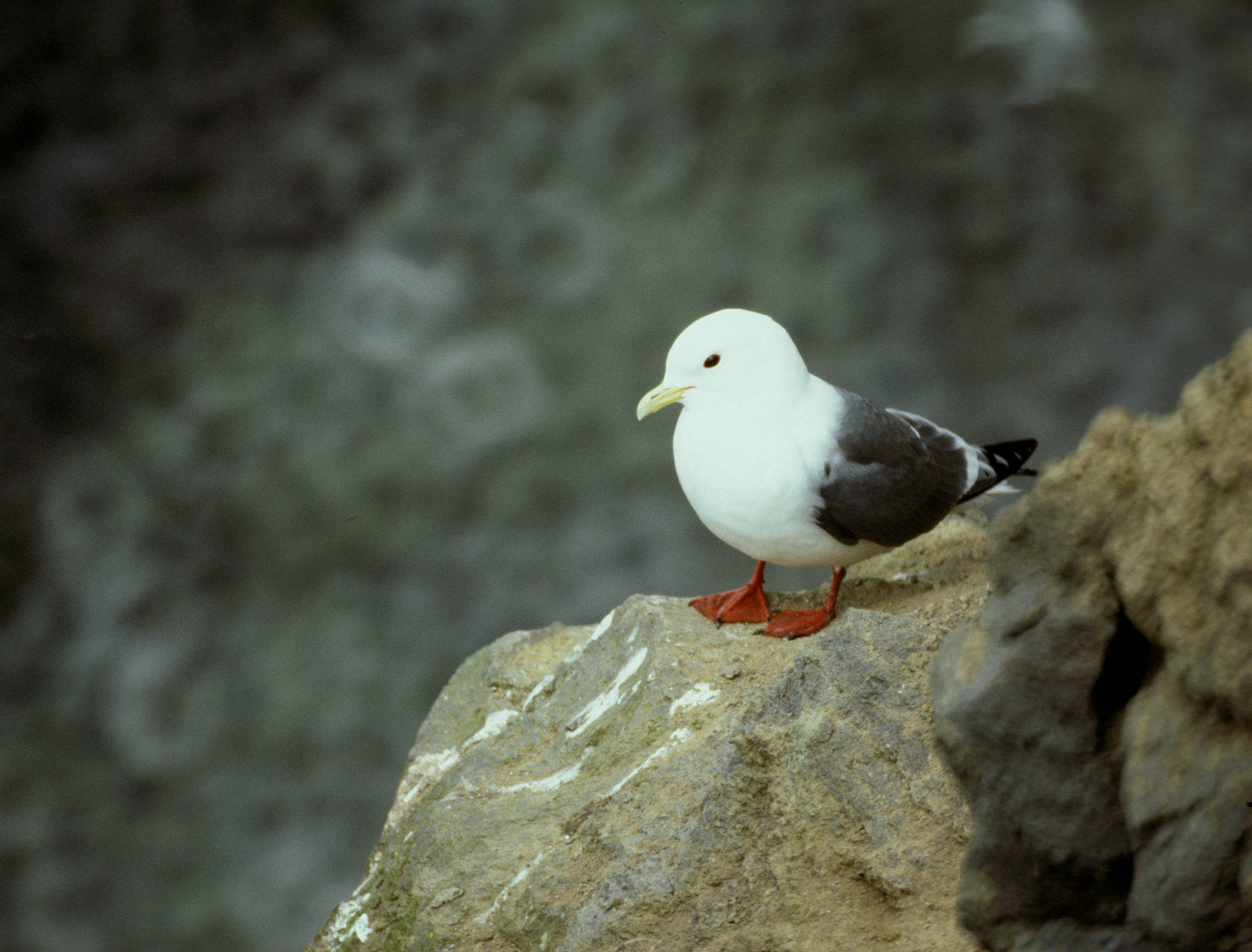
Red-legged kittiwake

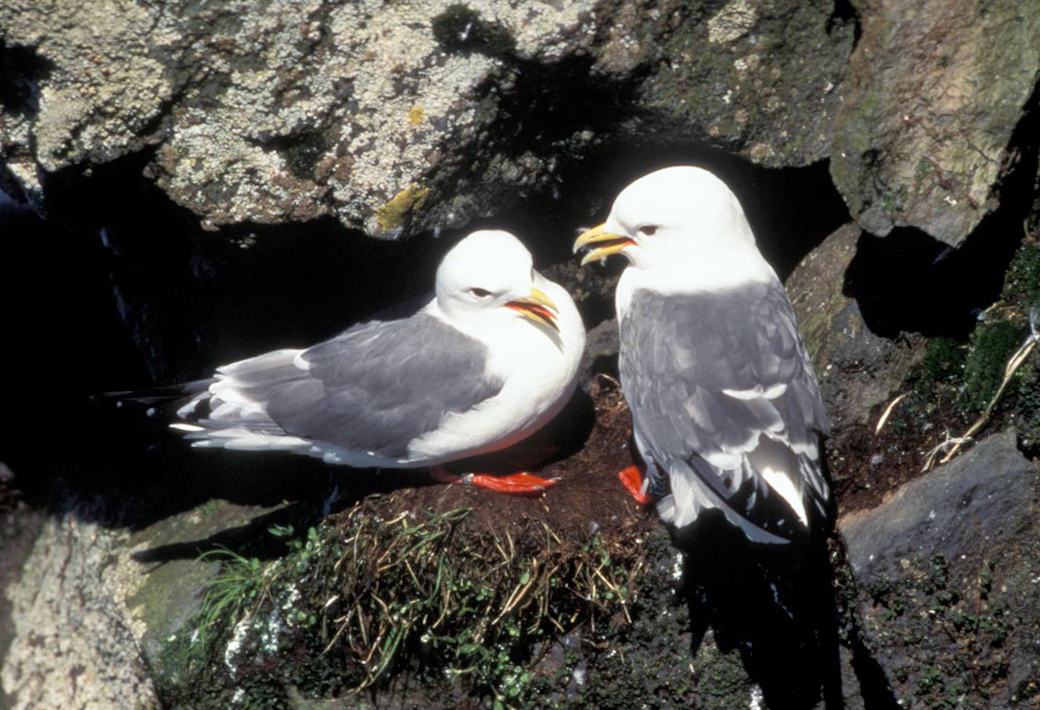
Red-legged kittiwake pair

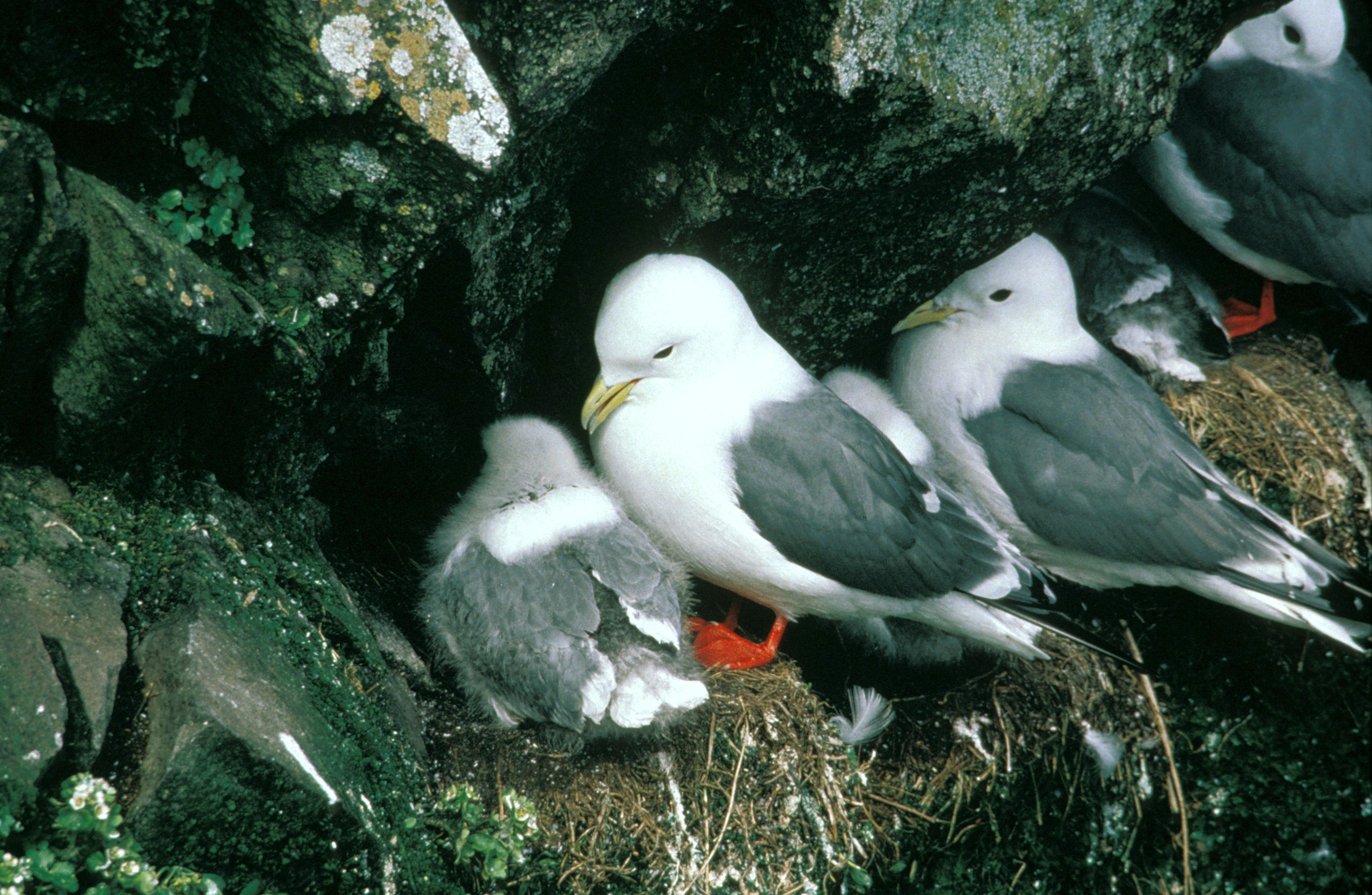

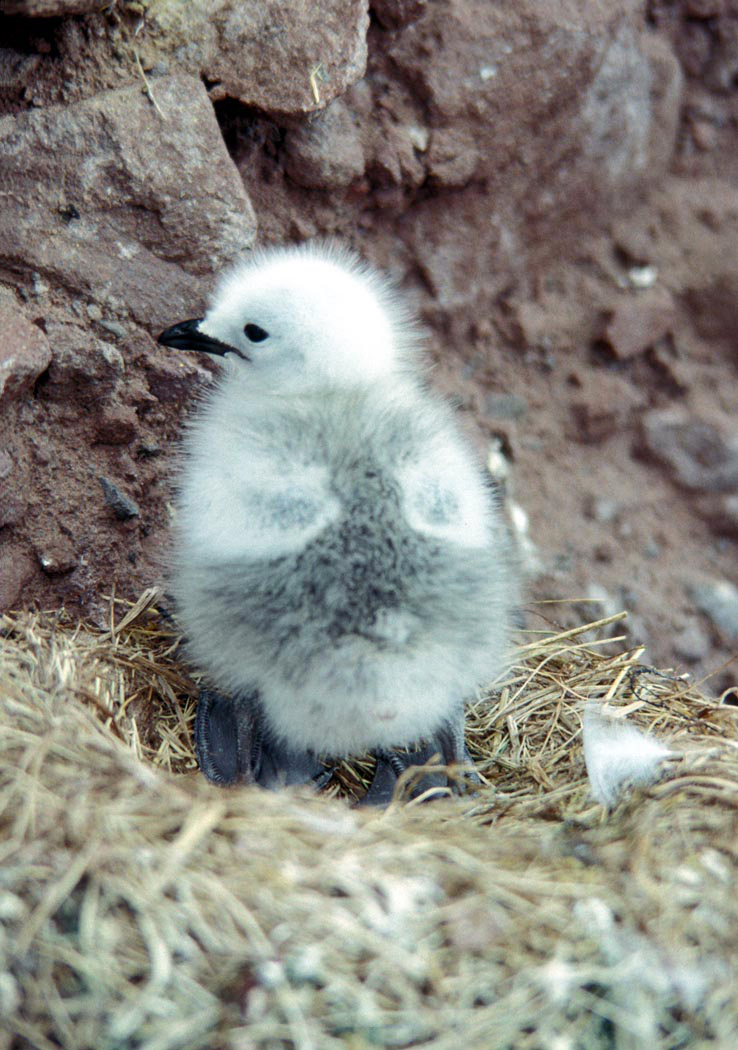
Red-legged kittiwake chick

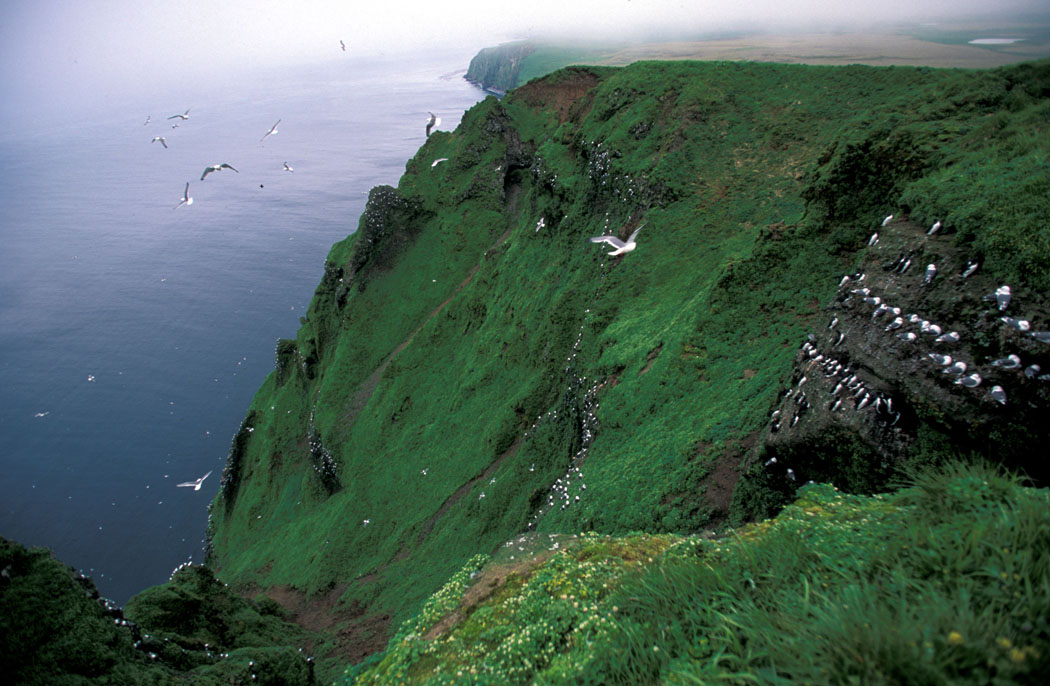
Red-legged kittiwake colony, St. George Island, Alaska
