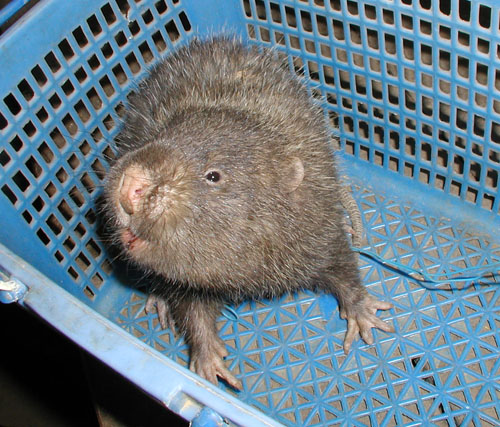
- Lesser bamboo rat, Cannomys badius

Scientific classification
- Kingdom: Animalia
- Phylum: Chordata
- Class: Mammalia
- Order: Rodentia
- Family: Spalacidae
- Subfamily: Rhizomyinae; Winge, 1887

Genera
- Rhizomys; Cannomys; Tachyoryctes

= Rhizomyinae =

Rhizomyinae Temporal range: Early Miocene - Recent

Subfamily of rodents

The rodent subfamily Rhizomyinae includes the Asian bamboo rats and certain of the African mole-rats. The subfamily is grouped with the Spalacinae and the Myospalacinae into a family of fossorial muroid rodents basal to the other Muroidea.

The group includes 17 species classified in three genera and two tribes:

- Subfamily Rhizomyinae
  - Tribe Rhizomyini - Bamboo rats
    - Genus Rhizomys
      - Hoary bamboo rat, Rhizomys pruinosus
      - Chinese bamboo rat, Rhizomys sinensis
      - Large bamboo rat, Rhizomys sumatrensis
    - Genus Cannomys
      - Lesser bamboo rat, Cannomys badius
  - Tribe Tachyoryctini
    - Genus Tachyoryctes - African mole-rats
      - Ankole African mole-rat, Tachyoryctes ankoliae
      - Mianzini African mole-rat, Tachyoryctes annectens
      - Aberdare Mountains African mole-rat, Tachyoryctes audax
      - Demon African mole-rat, Tachyoryctes daemon
      - Kenyan African mole-rat, Tachyoryctes ibeanus
      - Big-headed African mole-rat, Tachyoryctes macrocephalus
      - Navivasha African mole-rat, Tachyoryctes naivashae
      - King African mole-rat, Tachyoryctes rex
      - Rwanda African mole-rat, Tachyoryctes ruandae
      - Rudd's African mole-rat, Tachyoryctes ruddi
      - Embi African mole-rat, Tachyoryctes spalacinus
      - Northeast African mole-rat, Tachyoryctes splendens
      - Storey's African mole-rat, Tachyoryctes storeyi

Note that the Rhizomyinae do not include two other groups which also have the common name mole rats and are also found in Africa. The closely related subfamily Spalacinae consists of mole-like rodents found in Africa and the Middle East; these are also myomorphic rodents. The family Bathyergidae, or African mole-rats (including the well-known naked mole-rat), belong to the other major division of the rodents, the hystricomorphs.

All the rhizomyines are bulky, slow-moving, burrowing animals, the Rhizomys species being the largest and stockiest. They vary in length from 150 to 480 mm (head and body) with a tail of 50 to 200 mm, and their weights are from 150 g to 4 kg, depending on the species. They mainly feed on the underground parts of plants, which they reach from foraging burrows. They are rarely active above ground, and if they do come out of their extensive burrow systems, it is at twilight or during the night. They are similar to the pocket gophers but lack cheek pouches. All are to some extent agricultural pests, attacking food crops, and are therefore hunted; the Asian species are eaten in the areas where they are found, while the skins of the African species are used as amulets.
