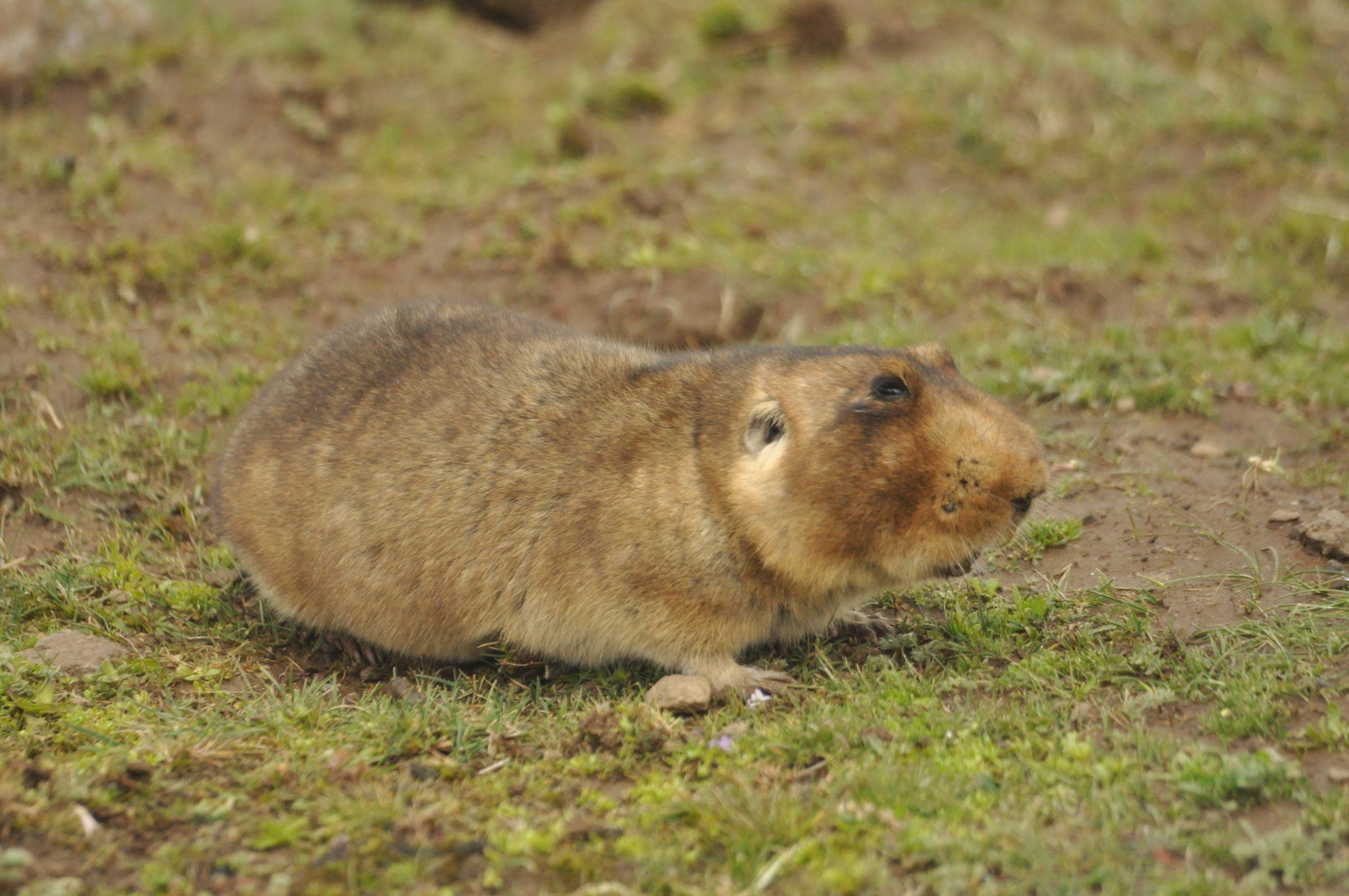
- Bale Mountains, Ethiopia

Conservation status
- Endangered (IUCN 3.1)

Scientific classification
- Kingdom: Animalia
- Phylum: Chordata
- Class: Mammalia
- Order: Rodentia
- Family: Spalacidae
- Genus: Tachyoryctes
- Species: T. macrocephalus

Binomial name
- Tachyoryctes macrocephalus Rüppell, 1842

Synonyms
- Tachyoryctes hecki Neumann & Rümmler 1928

= Giant root-rat =

Species of rodent

The giant root-rat (Tachyoryctes macrocephalus), also known as the Ethiopian African mole rat, is a species of rodent in the genus Tachyoryctes. The species is endemic to Ethiopia's Bale Mountains, and its natural habitat is subtropical or tropical high-altitude grassland, where the population can reach densities of up to 2,600 individuals per square kilometre. The giant root-rat has thick fur and large teeth, and creates large networks of tunnels whilst foraging for food before making holes to the surface to feed on nearby vegetation. There are many species that prey on Tachyoryctes macrocephalus, especially the Ethiopian wolf, and it is threatened by habitat loss.

== Characteristics ==
Tachyoryctes macrocephalus typically have small eyes and thick russet fur, as well as especially prominent incisors. The eyes are placed near the top of the forehead, and are sometimes called "periscopes" due to their ability to scan for predators. Individuals usually lack a part of the ear called a pinna, the limbs are typically short with claws, and they have short tails. Body weight can range between 160 grams to 930 grams, and the length of their body ranges from 160 millimeters to 313 millimeters. Molars are hypsodont (having a high crown and a short root), and the interparietal bone is very short.

The hair is usually gray at its base, and the head is significantly larger than the rest of the body. Giant root-rats typically eat grasses nearby their burrows and spend the majority of their time underground. Their typical body mass is around one kilogram. In the skeleton, its occipital shield is small and horizontal, the zygomatic plate is very broad and vertical, the mesopterygoid fossa is V-shaped and the back of the glenoid fossa is open. Male root-rats are often larger in size compared to female ones.

=== Reproduction ===
Giant root-rats breed year-round and gestation lasts for 37 to 49 days. Some females are polyestrous (conceiving a second young whilst nursing the first) or breed once every 6 months. Males sometimes deposit a copulatory plug to help assist during mating. Giant root-rats use rainfall and changing temperatures to help determine the appropriate time for breeding. Females in the genus Tachyoryctes are induced ovulators, meaning ovulation usually only occurs during mating and not cyclically.

=== Phylogeny ===
Tachyoryctes macrocephalus is endemic to the grasslands in Ethiopia's Bale Mountains. It is a member of the genus Tachyoryctes, a sister genus to Rhizomys. Fossil records have suggested the species previously lived in South Asia up to northern India. The species likely originated from a split with Tachyoryctes splendens (the African root-rat) around 1.3 million years ago.

This cladogram shows the position of Tachyoryctes macrocephalus within the taxonomic family Spalacidae:

- Spalacidae
  - Spalacinae
    Spalax
  - Rhizomyinae
    - Rhizomys
    - Cannomys
  - Tachyoryctinae
    - Tachyoryctes
    - - Tachyoryctes splendens
      - Tachyoryctes macrocephalus

== Behavior ==
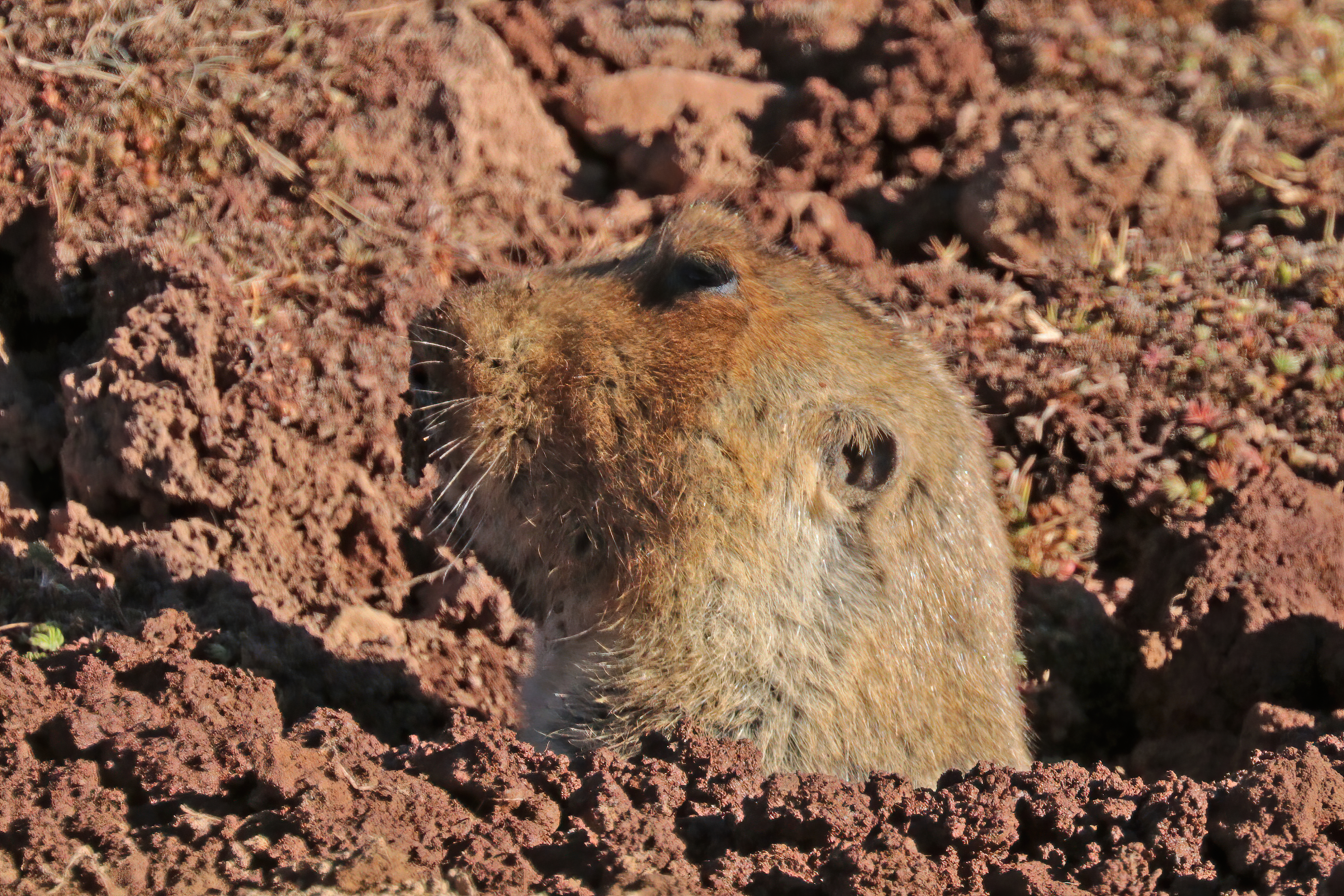
Looking out of burrow

Unlike other mole rats, which mostly forage underground, the giant root-rat primarily forages above ground, obtaining food by digging upwards and feasting upon patches of herbage beside the tunnel entrance. It forages for about 20 minutes, until it has exhausted the supply of herbs about its tunnel, after which it blocks the tunnel it has built from the inside. It mostly eats grasses and herbs, and some individuals feed mostly on roots. Giant root-rats collect their food without leaving the underground path they built, opting to leave the lower half of their body inside whilst quickly grabbing the vegetation outside. They build sprawling tunnel networks stretching up to 34 m (112 ft) in length, with numerous branching pathways varyingly dedicated to food storage, nesting, or defecation. The network of tunnels that are built significantly impact the ecology of the surrounding area.

Mainly solitary, males and females live in separate burrow systems. Litter sizes are up to four, but one or two young is typical of this species, with gestation lasting 37 to 49 days. Weaning takes place by about 50 days after birth. The initially black juvenile develops the adult colouring aver the next few weeks and reaches sexual maturity in four to six months.

Like other fossorial rodents, the root-rat often refills unused tunnels with less compact soil, thereby creating variability in soil hardness. Examination of the nutrient concentration in soil affected by root-rats has revealed that the less compact dirt contained a greater degree of nutrients, which is atypical, as soil from deeper areas is typically less nutrient rich. One possible explanation for this phenomenon is that the root-rat often utilizes plant material as nest-bedding. This nest-bedding then becomes mixed with feces and soil, before being deposited in the abandoned burrows or above ground, where it would most likely increase the nutrient levels in the soil.

Various species are known to prey upon Tachyoryctes macrocephalus. The Ethiopian wolf (Canis simensis) uses the giant root-rat as its primary source of food, accounting for 96% of the prey they choose to eat alongside similar rodents. Early humans known as hunter-gatherers (around 47,000 years ago) that lived in the Ethiopian region frequently preyed on the giant root-rat as well. Other predators of this species include Servals (Leptailurus serval), African striped weasels (Poecilogale albinucha), Abyssinian owls (Asio abyssinicus), among others. When being attacked by predators, the giant root-rat will try to escape by running back into the holes it had created in the past, and bite the predator if none are available nearby.

== Conservation ==
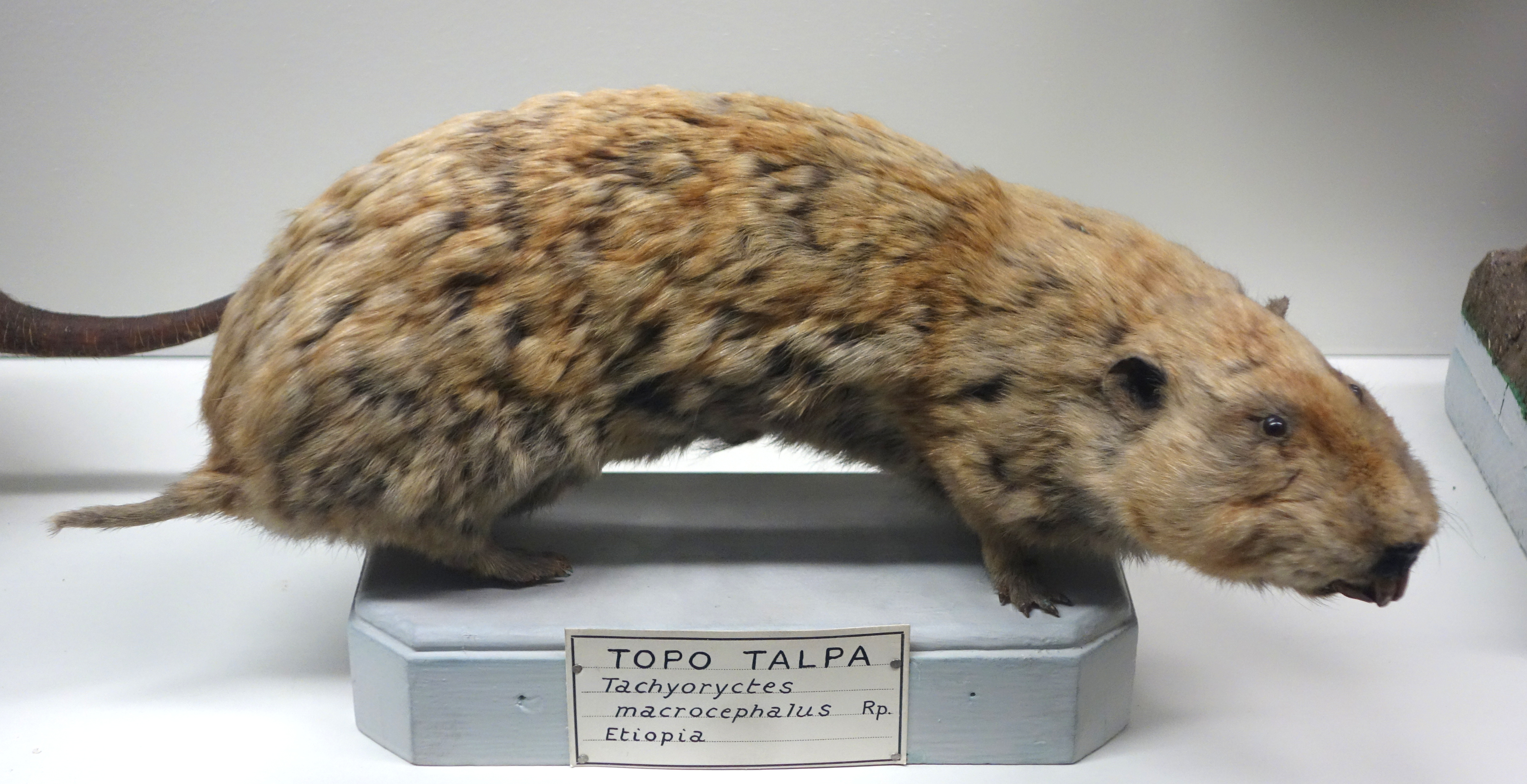
A stuffed Tachyoryctes macrocephalus at a museum in Genoa, Italy

The IUCN Red List has assessed the giant root-rat as an endangered species. Humans settling in areas the rodent inhabits has impacted how Tachyoryctes macrocephalus tends to burrow. They are only found in a relatively small area of less than 1,000 km^{2} (390 sq mi) in the Bale Mountains at a high altitude. Nearby livestock also has an effect on the availability of food for the giant root-rat. The livestock tends to consume the same vegetation as the rodent, thus hindering the availability of its food. Other factors resulting from the nearby livestock hurt the foods the rodents eat; particularly the feces can result in a condition in the soil called "nutrient overloading". This can lead to an increase in invasive plant species, and the movement of nearby animals can trample the rodent's potential food as well. The deteriorating habitat and limited space that the rodent lives in have resulted in a significant decrease in the population, leading to its endangered status. In 2010 there were determined to be around 2000 to 4,800 animals per square kilometre residing in the Bale Mountain area.

== Sources ==
- Kingdon, Jonathon (2015-04-23). The Kingdon Field Guide to African Mammals (2nd ed.). Bloomsbury Publishing. ISBN 978-1-4729-2135-2. OCLC 907676449.
- Hayssen, Virginia; Tienhoven, Ari (1993). Asdell's patterns of mammalian reproduction: a compendium of species-specific data. Comstock Publishing Associates. ISBN 978-0-8014-1753-5. OCLC 27188281.
- Kingdon, Jonathan (1989). Island Africa: The Evolution of Africa's Rare Plants and Animals. Princeton, New Jersey: Princeton University Press. ISBN 0-691-08560-9.
- Kingdon, Jonathon; Happold, David (2013). Mammals of Africa. London: Bloomsbury Publishing. ISBN 978-1-4081-8996-2. OCLC 854973585.
- Šklíba, Jan; Vlasatá, Tereza; Lövy, Matěj; Hrouzková, Ema; Meheretu, Yonas; Sillero-Zubiri, Claudio; Šumbera, Radim (2017). "Ecological role of the giant root‐rat (Tachyoryctes macrocephalus) in the Afroalpine ecosystem". Integrative Zoology. 12 (4): 333–344. doi:10.1111/1749-4877.12241. ISSN 1749-4877.
