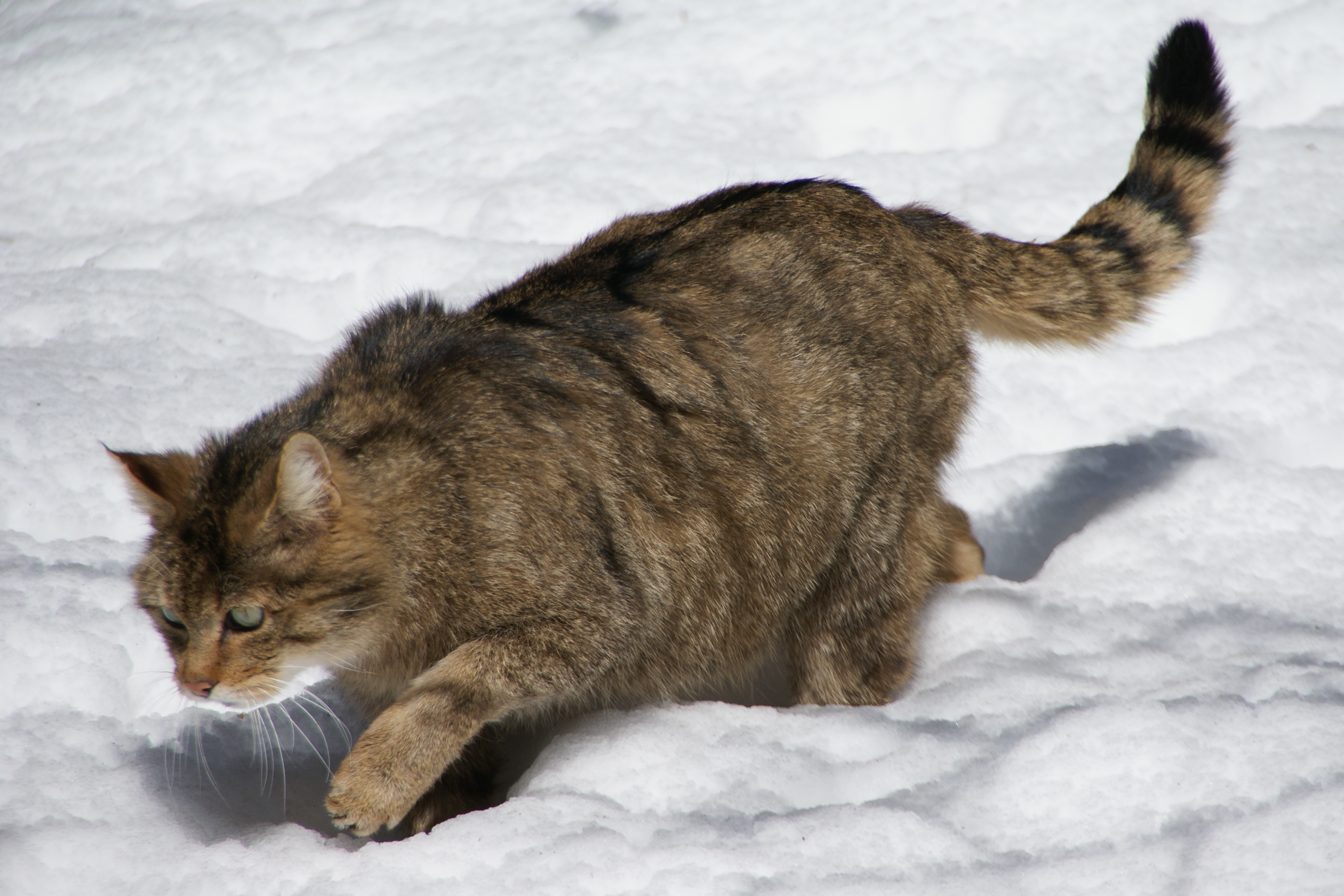
- European wildcat (Felis silvestris)
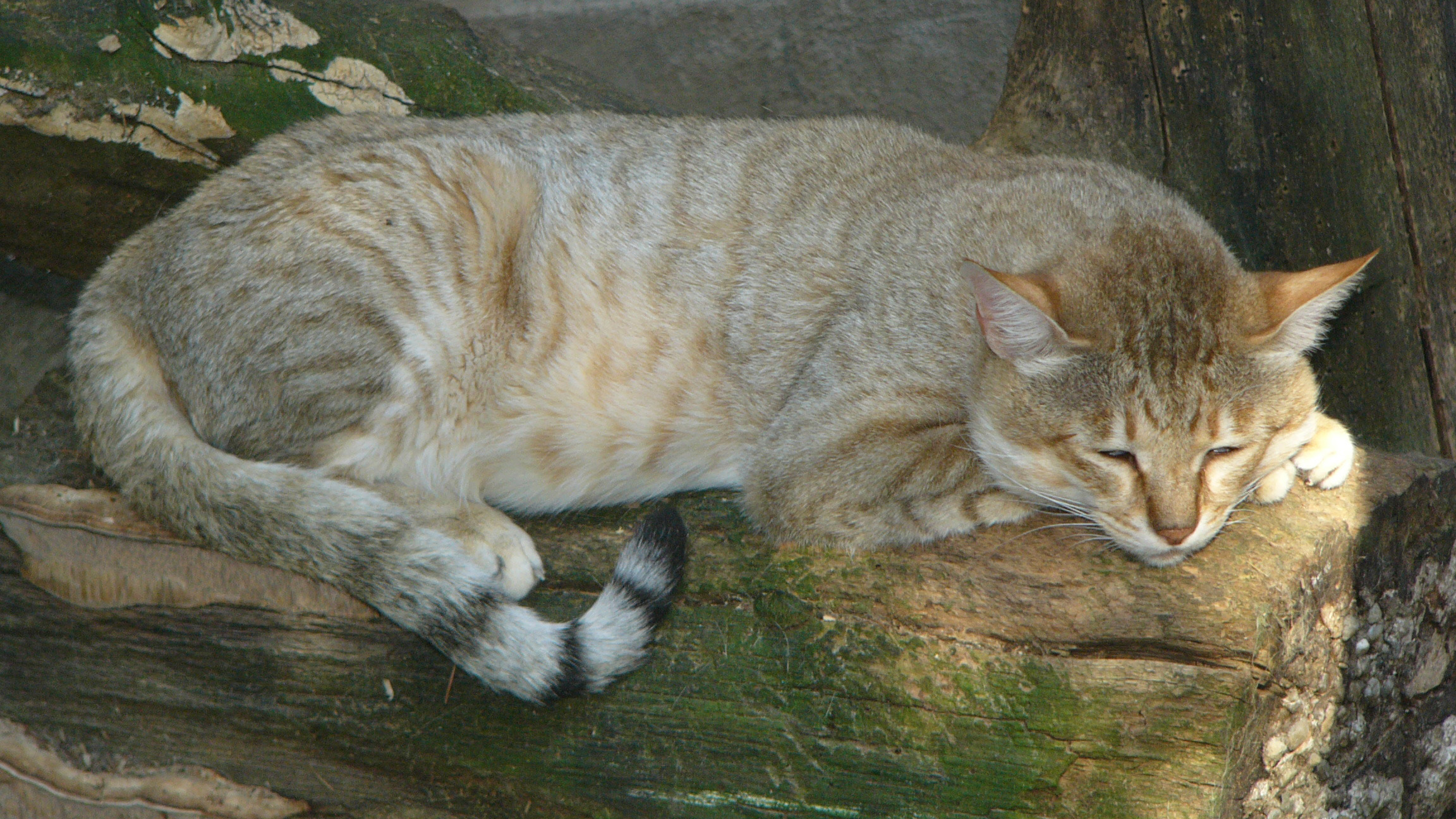
- African wildcat (Felis lybica)

Conservation status
- Least Concern (IUCN 3.1)

Scientific classification
- Kingdom: Animalia
- Phylum: Chordata
- Class: Mammalia
- Order: Carnivora
- Family: Felidae
- Subfamily: Felinae
- Genus: Felis

Binomial name
- Felis silvestris Schreber, 1777
- Felis lybica Forster, 1780
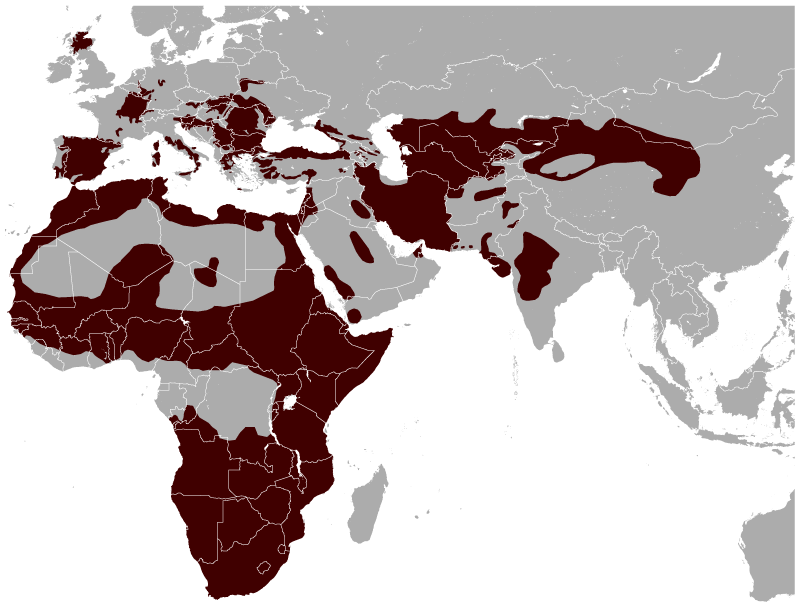
- Distribution of the wildcat species complex

= Wildcat =

Species group of mammals

The wildcat is a species complex comprising two small wild cat species: the European wildcat (Felis silvestris) and the African wildcat (F. lybica). The European wildcat inhabits forests in Europe, Anatolia and the Caucasus, while the African wildcat inhabits semi-arid landscapes and steppes in Africa, the Arabian Peninsula, Central Asia, into western India and western China. The wildcat species differ in fur pattern, tail, and size: the European wildcat has long fur and a bushy tail with a rounded tip; the smaller African wildcat is more faintly striped, has short sandy-gray fur and a tapering tail; the Asiatic wildcat (F. lybica ornata) is spotted.

The wildcat and the other members of the cat family had a common ancestor about 10–15 million years ago. The European wildcat evolved during the Cromerian Stage about 866,000 to 478,000 years ago; its direct ancestor was Felis lunensis. The silvestris and lybica lineages probably diverged about 173,000 years ago.

The wildcat is categorized as Least Concern on the IUCN Red List since 2002, since it is widely distributed in a stable global population exceeding 20,000 mature individuals. Some local populations are threatened by introgressive hybridisation with the domestic cat (F. catus), contagious disease, vehicle collisions and persecution.

The association of African wildcats and humans appears to have developed along with the establishment of settlements during the Neolithic Revolution, when rodents in grain stores of early farmers attracted wildcats. This association ultimately led to it being tamed and domesticated: the domestic cat is the direct descendant of the African wildcat. It was one of the revered cats in ancient Egypt. The European wildcat has been the subject of mythology and literature.

== Taxonomy ==
Felis (catus) silvestris was the scientific name used in 1777 by Johann von Schreber when he described the European wildcat based on descriptions and names proposed by earlier naturalists such as Mathurin Jacques Brisson, Ulisse Aldrovandi and Conrad Gessner. Felis lybica was the name proposed in 1780 by Georg Forster, who described an African wildcat from Gafsa on the Barbary Coast.

In subsequent decades, several naturalists and explorers described 40 wildcat specimens collected in European, African and Asian range countries. In the 1940s, the taxonomist Reginald Innes Pocock reviewed the collection of wildcat skins and skulls in the Natural History Museum, London, and designated seven F. silvestris subspecies from Europe to Asia Minor, and 25 F. lybica subspecies from Africa, and West to Central Asia. Pocock differentiated the:

- Forest wildcat subspecies (silvestris group)
- Steppe wildcat subspecies (ornata-caudata group): is distinguished from the forest wildcat by being smaller, with comparatively lighter fur colour, and longer and more sharply-pointed tails. The domestic cat is thought to have derived from this group.
- Bush wildcat subspecies (ornata-lybica group): is distinguished from the steppe wildcat by paler fur, well-developed spot patterns and bands.

In 2005, 22 subspecies were recognized by the authors of Mammal Species of the World, who allocated subspecies largely in line with Pocock's assessment.

In 2006, the Chinese mountain cat was placed within the wildcat lineage, being found to be more closely related to the Asiatic wildcat and the domestic cat than to the European wildcat through nuclear DNA, while being placed as an outgroup to the wildcat clade through mitochondrial DNA.

In 2017, the Cat Classification Task Force revised the taxonomy of the Felidae, and recognized the following as valid taxa:

Species and subspecies	Characteristics	Image
European wildcat (F. silvestris) Schreber, 1777; syn. F. s. ferus Erxleben, 1777; obscura Desmarest, 1820; hybrida Fischer, 1829; ferox Martorelli, 1896; morea Trouessart, 1904; grampia Miller, 1907; tartessia Miller, 1907; molisana Altobello, 1921; reyi Lavauden, 1929; jordansi Schwarz, 1930; euxina Pocock, 1943; cretensis Haltenorth, 1953	This species and the nominate subspecies has dark grey fur with distinct transverse stripes on the sides and a bushy tail with a rounded black tip.	
Caucasian wildcat (F. s. caucasica) Satunin, 1905; syn. trapezia Blackler, 1916	This subspecies is light grey with well developed patterns on the head and back and faint transverse bands and spots on the sides. The tail has three distinct black transverse rings.	
African wildcat (F. lybica) Forster, 1780; syn. F. l. ocreata Gmelin, 1791; nubiensis Kerr, 1792; maniculata Temminck, 1824; mellandi Schwann, 1904; rubida Schwann, 1904; ugandae Schwann, 1904; mauritana Cabrera, 1906; nandae Heller, 1913; taitae Heller, 1913; nesterovi Birula, 1916; iraki Cheesman, 1921; hausa Thomas and Hinton, 1921; griselda Thomas, 1926; brockmani Pocock, 1944; foxi Pocock, 1944; pyrrhus Pocock, 1944; gordoni Harrison, 1968	This species and the nominate subspecies has pale, buffish or light-greyish fur with a tinge of red on the dorsal band; the length of its pointed tail is about two-thirds of the head to body size.	
Southern African wildcat (F. l. cafra) Desmarest, 1822; syn. F. l. xanthella Thomas, 1926; vernayi Roberts, 1932	This subspecies does not differ significantly in colour and pattern from the nominate one. The available zoological specimens merely have slightly longer skulls than those from farther north in Africa.	
Asiatic wildcat (F. l. ornata) Gray, 1830; syn. syriaca Tristram, 1867; caudata Gray, 1874; maniculata Yerbury and Thomas, 1895; kozlovi Satunin, 1905; matschiei Zukowsky, 1914; griseoflava Zukowsky, 1915; longipilis Zukowsky, 1915; macrothrix Zukowsky, 1915; murgabensis Zukowsky, 1915; schnitnikovi Birula, 1915; issikulensis Ognev, 1930; tristrami Pocock, 1944	This subspecies has dark spots on light, ochreous-grey coloured fur.	

== Evolution ==
The wildcat is a member of the Felidae, a family that had a common ancestor about 10–15 million years ago. Felis species diverged from the Felidae around 6–7 million years ago. The European wildcat diverged from Felis about 1.09 to 1.4 million years ago.

The European wildcat's direct ancestor was Felis lunensis, which lived in Europe in the late Pliocene and Villafranchian periods. Fossil remains indicate that the transition from lunensis to silvestris was completed by the Holstein interglacial about 340,000 to 325,000 years ago.

While an extensive fossil record exists in Europe, the oldest wildcat fossils recovered in Africa and the Middle East originate from the Late Pleistocene beginning roughly 130,000 years before present, which indicate that the wildcat probably migrated from Europe into the Middle East during this period, giving rise to the steppe wildcat phenotype. A second wave of expansion occurred shortly afterwards from the Pleistocene Middle Eastern wildcat, eastward into Asia and southward through the Sinai Peninsula into Africa, the latter likely resulting in a population bottleneck. Phylogenetic research revealed that the lybica lineage probably diverged from the silvestris lineage about 173,000 years ago. The steppe lineage did not re-enter Europe during its expansion, and the two lineages have remained genetically distinct since; hybridization between forest and domestic cats marks the first large-scale genetic connection between the two groups since their original divergence.

== Characteristics ==
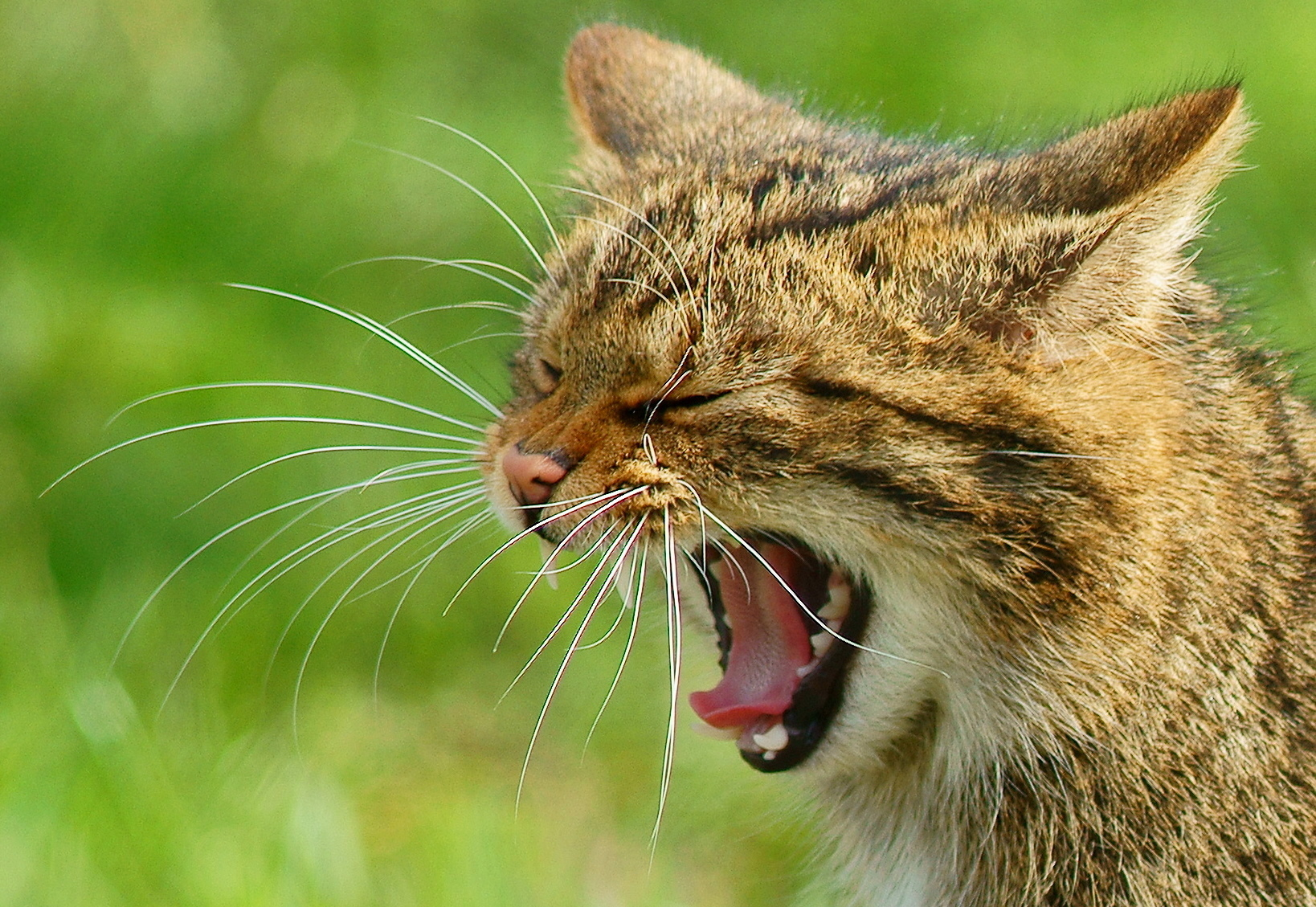
European wildcat face

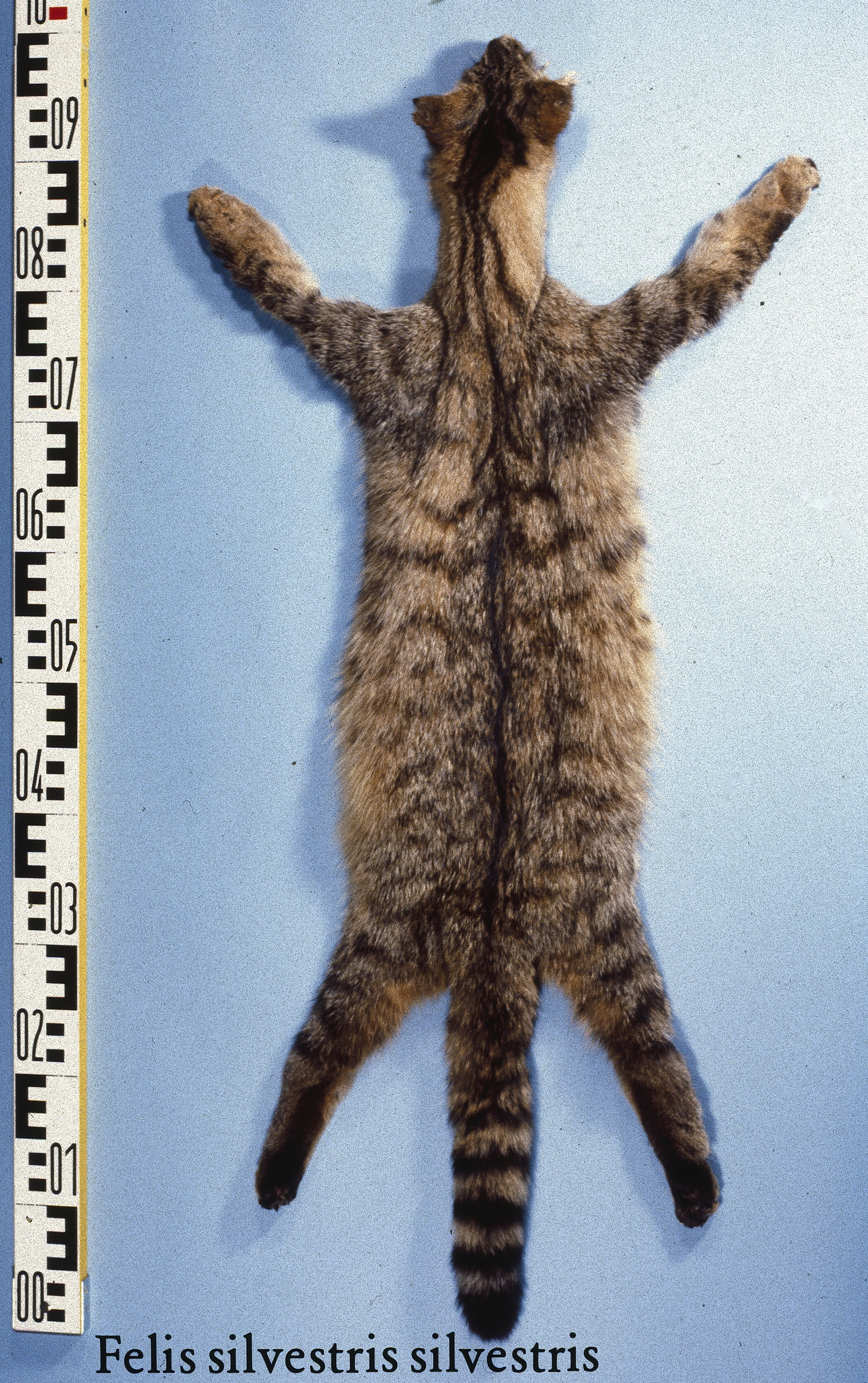
Skin of a European wildcat

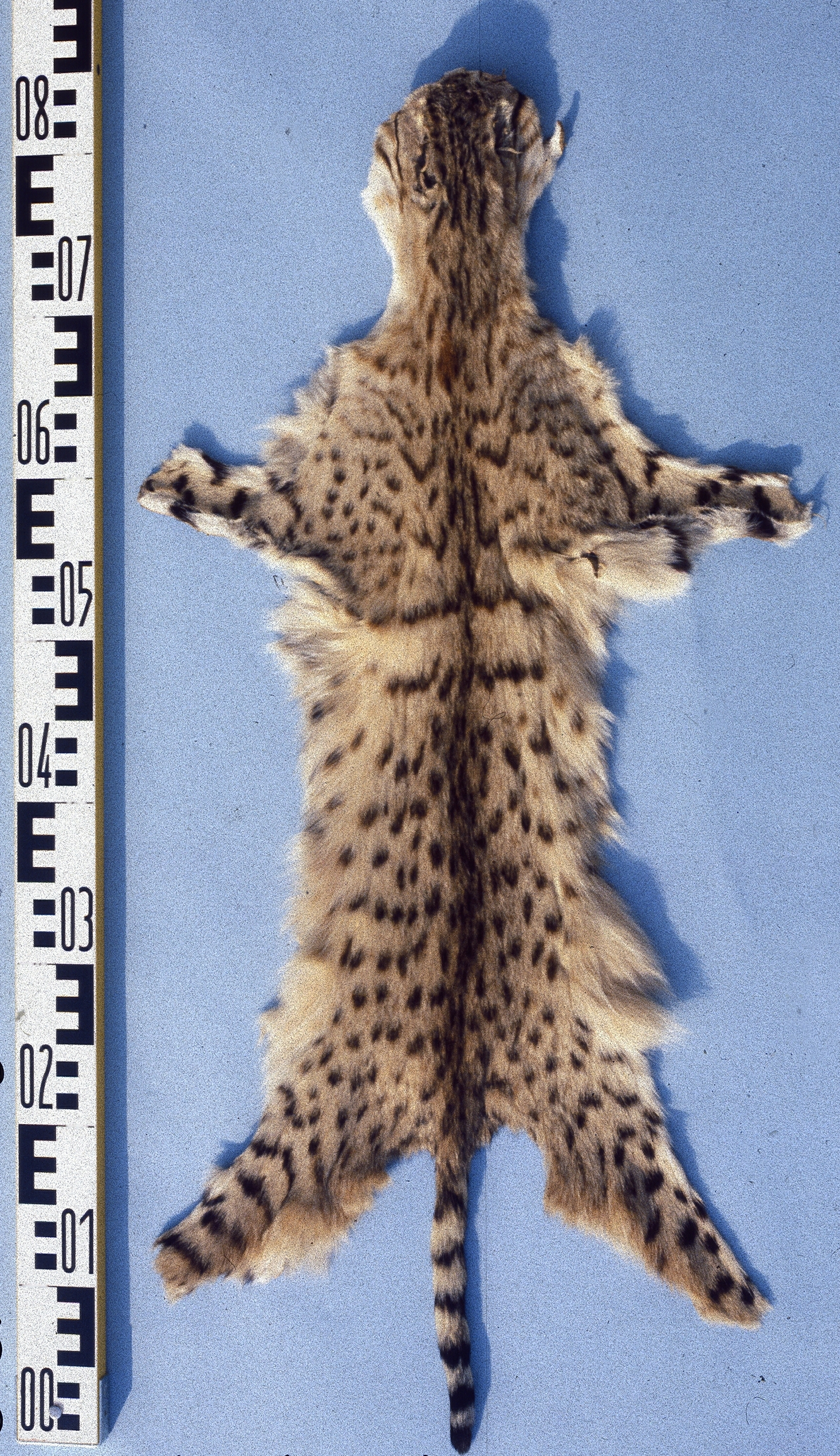
Skin of an Asiatic wildcat from India

The wildcat has pointed ears, which are moderate in length and broad at the base. Its whiskers are white, number 7 to 16 on each side and reach 5–8 cm (2.0–3.1 in) in length on the muzzle. Whiskers are also present on the inner surface of the paw and measure 3–4 cm (1.2–1.6 in). Its eyes are large, with vertical pupils and yellowish-green irises. The eyelashes range from 5–6 cm (2.0–2.4 in) in length, and can number six to eight per side.

The European wildcat has a greater skull volume than the domestic cat, a ratio known as Schauenberg's index. Further, its skull is more spherical in shape than that of the jungle cat (F. chaus) and leopard cat (Prionailurus bengalensis). Its dentition is relatively smaller and weaker than the jungle cat's.

Both wildcat species are larger than the domestic cat. The European wildcat has relatively longer legs and a more robust build compared to the domestic cat. The tail is long, and usually slightly exceeds one-half of the animal's body length. The species size varies according to Bergmann's rule, with the largest specimens occurring in cool, northern areas of Europe and Asia such as Mongolia, Manchuria and Siberia. Males measure 43–91 cm (17–36 in) in head to body length, 23–40 cm (9.1–15.7 in) in tail length, and normally weigh 5–8 kg (11–18 lb). Females are slightly smaller, measuring 40–77 cm (16–30 in) in body length and 18–35 cm (7.1–13.8 in) in tail length, and weighing 3–5 kg (6.6–11.0 lb).

Both sexes have four pairs of teats inguinal, abdominal, pectoral, and axillary. Both sexes have pre-anal glands, consisting of moderately sized sweat and sebaceous glands around the anal opening. Large-sized sebaceous and scent glands extend along the full length of the tail on the dorsal side. Male wildcats have pre-anal pockets on the tail, activated upon reaching sexual maturity, play a significant role in reproduction and territorial marking.

== Distribution and habitat ==
The European wildcat inhabits temperate broadleaf and mixed forests in Europe, Turkey and the Caucasus. In the Iberian Peninsula, it occurs from sea level to 2,250 m (7,380 ft) in the Pyrenees. Between the late 17th and mid 20th centuries, its European range became fragmented due to large-scale hunting and regional extirpation. It is possibly extinct in the Czech Republic, and considered regionally extinct in Austria, though vagrants from Italy are spreading into Austria. It has never inhabited Fennoscandia or Estonia. Sicily is the only island in the Mediterranean Sea with a native wildcat population.

The African wildcat lives in a wide range of habitats except rainforest, but throughout the savannahs of Africa from Mauritania on the Atlantic coast eastward to the Horn of Africa up to altitudes of 3,000 m (9,800 ft). Small populations live in the Sahara and Nubian Deserts, Karoo region, Kalahari and Namib Deserts. It occurs around the Arabian Peninsula's periphery to the Caspian Sea, encompassing Mesopotamia, Israel and Palestine region. In Central Asia, it ranges into Xinjiang and southern Mongolia, and in South Asia into the Thar Desert and arid regions in India.

== Behaviour and ecology ==
Both wildcat species are largely nocturnal and solitary, except during the breeding period and when females have young. The size of home ranges of females and males varies according to terrain, the availability of food, habitat quality and the age structure of the population. Male and female home ranges overlap, though core areas within territories are avoided by other cats. Females tend to be more sedentary than males, as they require an exclusive hunting area when raising kittens. Wildcats usually spend the day in a hollow tree, a rock crevice or in dense thickets. It is also reported to shelter in abandoned burrows of other species such as of red fox (Vulpes vulpes) and in European badger (Meles meles) setts in Europe, and of fennec (Vulpes zerda) in Africa.

When threatened, it retreats into a burrow, rather than climb trees. When taking residence in a tree hollow, it selects one low to the ground. Dens in rocks or burrows are lined with dry grasses and bird feathers. Dens in tree hollows usually contain enough sawdust to make lining unnecessary. If the den becomes infested with fleas, the wildcat shifts to another den. During winter, when snowfall prevents the European wildcat from travelling long distances, it remains in its den until travel conditions improve.

Territorial marking consists of spraying urine on trees, vegetation and rocks, depositing faeces in conspicuous places, and leaving scent marks through glands in its paws. It also leaves visual marks by scratching trees.

=== Hunting and prey ===
Paintings of wildcats

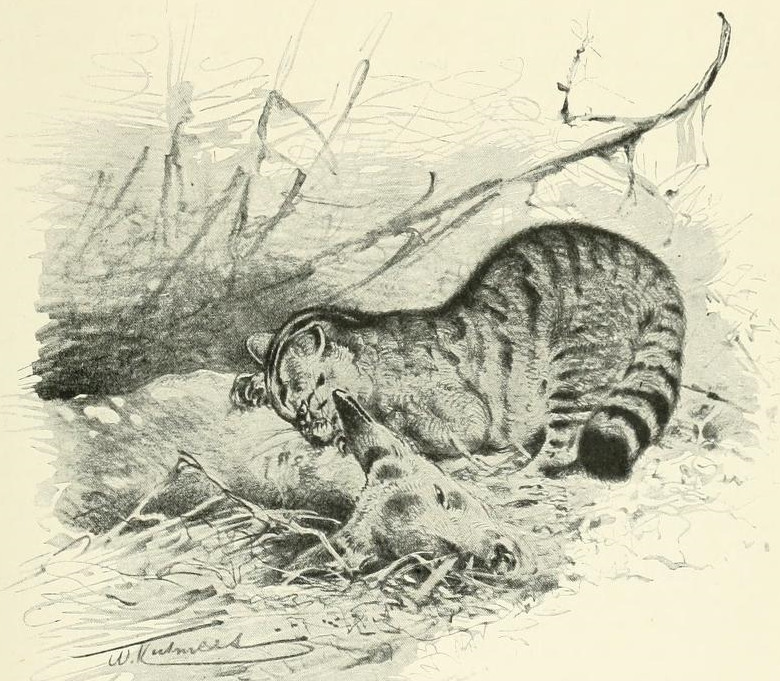
European wildcat killing a deer fawn, by Lydekker's Wild Life of the World (1916)

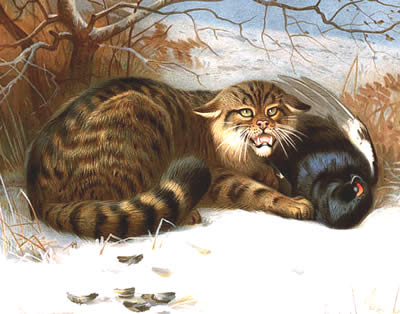
Scottish wildcat with black grouse carcass, by Archibald Thorburn (1902)

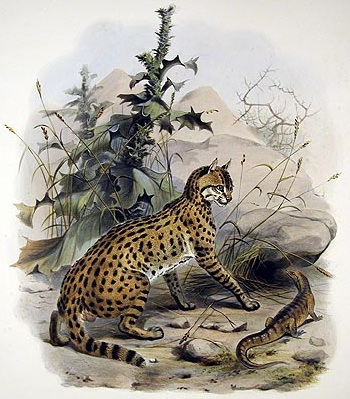
Asian wildcat hunting monitor lizard, by Daniel Giraud Elliot (1883)

Sight and hearing are the wildcat's primary senses when hunting. It lies in wait for prey, then catches it by executing a few leaps, which can span three metres. When hunting near water courses, it waits on trees overhanging the water. It kills small prey by grabbing it in its claws, and piercing the neck or occiput with its fangs. When attacking large prey, it leaps upon the animal's back, and attempts to bite the neck or carotid. It does not persist in attacking if prey manages to escape.

The European wildcat primarily preys on small mammals such as European rabbit (Oryctolagus cuniculus) and rodents. It also preys on dormice, hares, nutria (Myocastor coypus) and birds, especially ducks and other waterfowl, galliformes, pigeons and passerines. It can consume large bone fragments. Although it kills insectivores such as moles and shrews, it rarely eats them. When living close to human settlements, it preys on poultry. In the wild, it consumes up to 600 g (21 oz) of food daily.

The African wildcat preys foremost on murids, to a lesser extent also on birds, small reptiles and invertebrates.

=== Reproduction and development ===
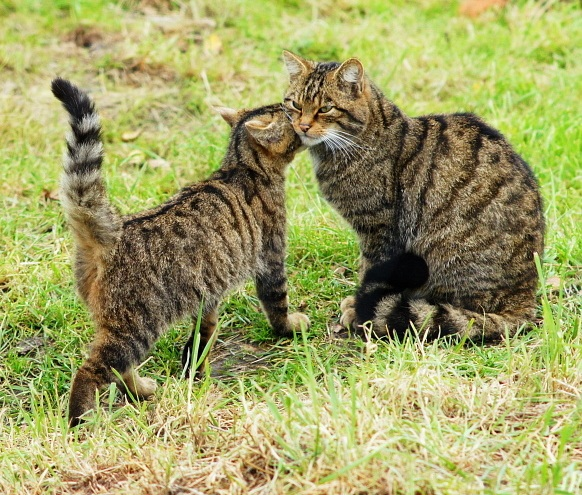
Scottish wildcat with kitten, British Wildlife Centre, Surrey

The wildcat has two estrus periods, one in December–February and another in May–July. Estrus lasts 5–9 days, with a gestation period lasting 60–68 days. Ovulation is induced through copulation. Spermatogenesis occurs throughout the year. During the mating season, males fight viciously, and may congregate around a single female. There are records of male and female wildcats becoming temporarily monogamous. Kittens are usually born between April and May, and up to August. Litter size ranges from 1–7 kittens.

Kittens are born with closed eyes and are covered in a fuzzy coat. They weigh 65–163 g (2.3–5.7 oz) at birth, and kittens under 90 g (3.2 oz) usually do not survive. They are born with pink paw pads, which blacken at the age of three months, and blue eyes, which turn amber after five months. Their eyes open after 9–12 days, and their incisors erupt after 14–30 days. The kittens' milk teeth are replaced by their permanent dentition at the age of 160–240 days. The kittens start hunting with their mother at the age of 60 days, and start moving independently after 140–150 days. Lactation lasts 3–4 months, though the kittens eat meat as early as 1.5 months of age. Sexual maturity is attained at the age of 300 days. Similarly to the domestic cat, the physical development of African wildcat kittens over the first two weeks of their lives is much faster than that of European wildcats. The kittens are largely fully grown by 10 months, though skeletal growth continues for over 18–19 months. The family dissolves after roughly five months, and the kittens disperse to establish their own territories. Their maximum life span is 21 years, though they usually live up to 13–14 years.

Generation length of the wildcat is about eight years.

=== Predators and competitors ===
Because of its habit of living in areas with rocks and tall trees for refuge, dense thickets and abandoned burrows, wildcats have few natural predators. In Central Europe, many kittens are killed by the European pine marten (Martes martes), and there is at least one account of an adult wildcat being killed and eaten. Competitors include the golden jackal (Canis aureus), red fox, marten, and other predators. In the steppe regions of Europe and Asia, village dogs constitute serious enemies of wildcats, along with the much larger Eurasian lynx, one of the rare habitual predators of healthy adult wildcats. In Tajikistan, the grey wolf (Canis lupus) is the most serious competitor, having been observed destroying cat burrows. Birds of prey, including Eurasian eagle-owl (Bubo bubo) and saker falcon (Falco cherrug), have been recorded killing wildcat kittens. Golden eagle (Aquila chrysaetos) are known to hunt both adults and kittens. Seton Gordon recorded an instance where a wildcat fought a golden eagle, resulting in the deaths of both combatants. In Africa, wildcats are occasionally killed and eaten by pythons and martial eagles (Polemaetus bellicosus).

== Threats ==
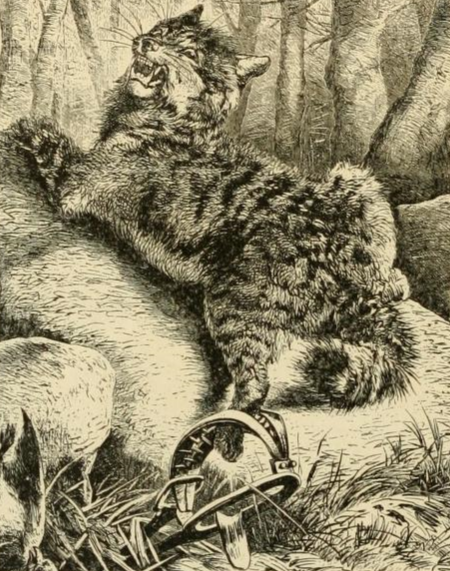
European wildcat caught in jaw trap, as illustrated in Brehms Tierleben

Wildcat populations are foremost threatened by hybridization with the domestic cat. Due to their greater physical similarity, hybridization produces less visible effects in steppe type wildcats. In the Middle East, North Africa, and southwest Asia, it can thus be difficult to reliably distinguish steppe wildcats and free-living domestic cats living in the same dry environments, and it is possible that some populations derive primarily from early feral cats.

Mortality due to traffic accidents is a threat especially in Europe. The wildcat population in Scotland has declined since the turn of the 20th century due to habitat loss and persecution by landowners.

In the former Soviet Union, wildcats were caught accidentally in traps set for European pine marten. In modern times, they are caught in unbaited traps on pathways or at abandoned trails of red fox, European badger, European hare or pheasant. One method of catching wildcats consists of using a modified muskrat trap with a spring placed in a concealed pit. A scent trail of pheasant viscera leads the cat to the pit. Wildcat skins were of little commercial value and sometimes converted into imitation sealskin; the fur usually fetched between 50 and 60 kopecks. Wildcat skins were almost solely used for making cheap scarfs, muffs and coats for ladies.

== Conservation ==
Wildcat species are protected in most range countries and listed in CITES Appendix II. The European wildcat is also listed in Appendix II of the Berne Convention on the Conservation of European Wildlife and Natural Habitats and in the European Union's Habitats and Species Directive. Conservation Action Plans have been developed in Germany and Scotland.

== In culture ==
=== Domestication ===
An African wildcat skeleton excavated in a 9,500-year-old Neolithic grave in Cyprus is the earliest known indication for a close relationship between a human and a possibly tamed cat. As no cat species is native to Cyprus, this discovery indicates that Neolithic farmers may have brought cats to Cyprus from the Near East. Results of genetics and morphological research corroborated that the African wildcat is the ancestor of the domestic cat. The first individuals were probably domesticated in the Fertile Crescent around the time of the introduction of agriculture. Murals and statuettes depicting cats as well as mummified cats indicate that it was commonly kept by ancient Egyptians since at least the Twelfth Dynasty of Egypt.

=== In mythology ===
Celtic fables of the Cat Sìth, a fairy creature described as resembling a large white-chested black cat, are thought to have been inspired by the Kellas cat, itself thought to be a free-ranging crossbreed between a European wildcat and a domestic cat. In 1693, William Salmon mentioned how body parts of the wildcat were used for medicinal purposes; its flesh for treating gout, its fat for dissolving tumours and easing pain, its blood for curing "falling sickness", and its excrement for treating baldness.

=== In heraldry ===
Crest of Clan Sutherland

The Picts venerated wildcats, having probably named Caithness (Land of the Cats) after them. According to the foundation myth of the Catti tribe, their ancestors were attacked by wildcats upon landing in Scotland. Their ferocity impressed the Catti so much, that the wildcat became their symbol. The progenitors of Clan Sutherland use the wildcat as symbol on their family crest. The clan's chief bears the title Morair Chat (Great Man of the Cats). The wildcat is considered an icon of Scottish wilderness, and has been used in clan heraldry since the 13th century. The Clan Chattan Association (also known as the Clan of Cats) comprises 12 clans, the majority of which display the wildcat on their badges.

Heraldic wildcats are sometimes called catamounts, cat-a-mounts ('cat of the mountain', a term also used for cougars) or musions ('mousers').

=== In literature ===
Shakespeare referenced the wildcat three times:

The patch is kind enough; but a huge feeder
Snail-slow in profit, and he sleeps by day
More than the wild cat.

— The Merchant of Venice Act 2 Scene 5 lines 47–49

Thou must be married to no man but me;
For I am he, am born to tame you, Kate;
And bring you from a wild cat to a Kate
Comfortable, as other household Kates.

— The Taming of the Shrew Act 2 Scene 1 lines 265–268

Thrice the brinded cat hath mew'd.

— Macbeth Act 4 Scene 1 line 1

Like the poor cat i'th' adage?

— Lady Macbeth's Monologue from of Macbeth Act 1, Scene 7
