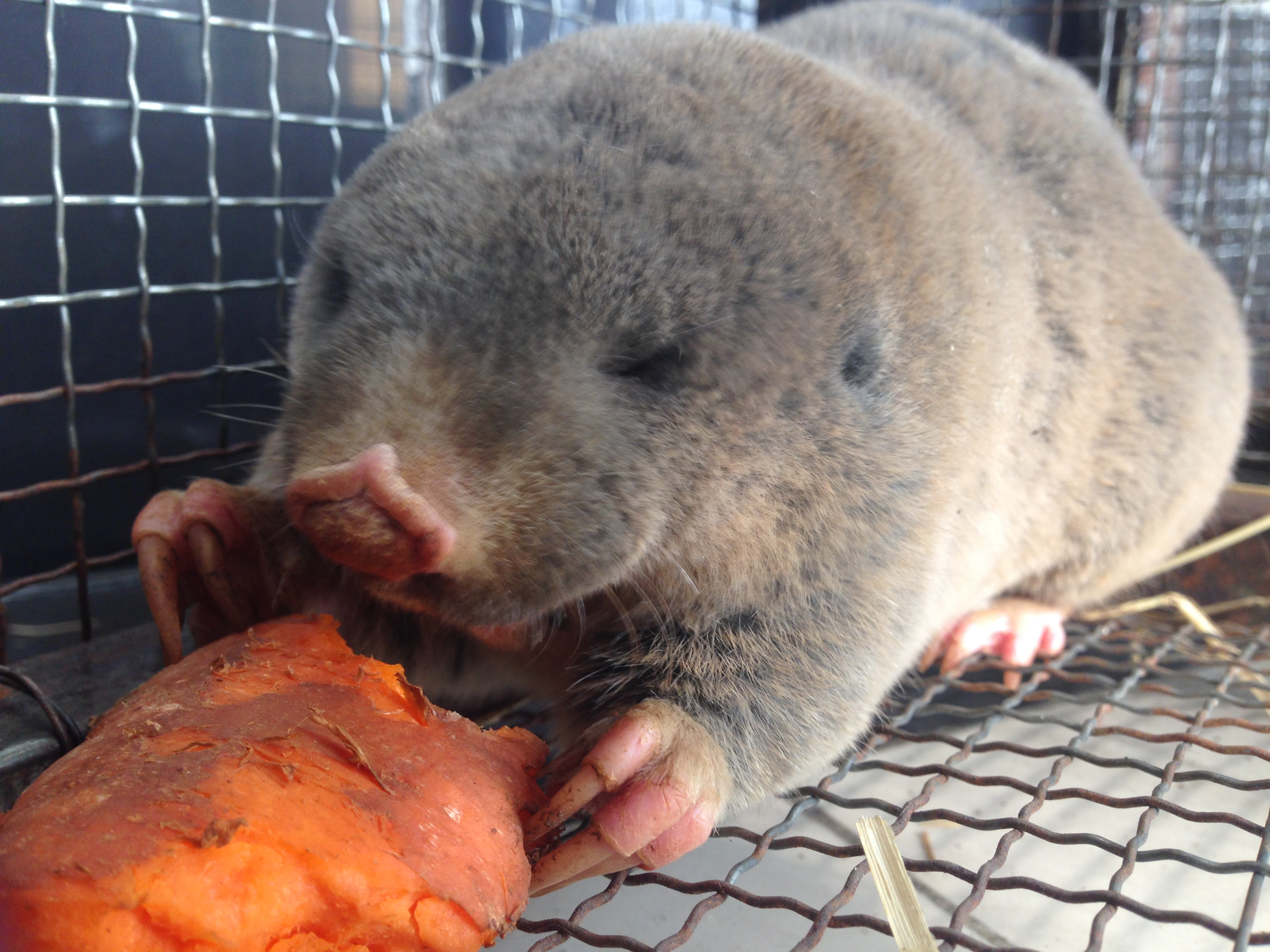
- Plateau zokor, (Eospalax fontanierii baileyi)

Scientific classification
- Kingdom: Animalia
- Phylum: Chordata
- Class: Mammalia
- Infraclass: Placentalia
- Order: Rodentia
- Family: Spalacidae
- Subfamily: Myospalacinae; Lilljeborg, 1866

Genera
- Eospalax; Myospalax †Pliosiphneus

= Zokor =

Zokors Temporal range: Late Miocene - recent

Subfamily of rodents

Zokors are Asiatic burrowing rodents resembling blind mole-rats. They include two genera: Myospalax and Eospalax. Zokors are native to much of China, Kazakhstan, and Siberian Russia.

Traditionally, zokors were thought to be closely related to either hamsters (Cricetinae) or voles (Arvicolinae), but molecular phylogenetic studies in 2004 demonstrated they are more closely related to blind mole-rats (Spalacinae) and root and bamboo rats (Rhizomyinae) in the family Spalacidae. This implies that one of the first important evolutionary splits in muroid rodents is between burrowing forms and nonburrowing forms.

Unlike the other spalacids, which primarily use their incisors, zokors use their powerful front claws for digging. They have small eyes and no external ears. Zokors feed on plant matter such as tubers and seeds.

== Taxonomy ==
Subfamily Myospalacinae

- Genus Myospalax
  - Myospalax myospalax species group
    - False zokor, M. aspalax
    - Siberian zokor, M. myospalax
  - Myospalax psilurus species group
    - Transbaikal zokor, M. psilurus
- Genus Eospalax
  - Chinese zokor, E. fontanierii
  - Rothschild's zokor, E. rothschildi
  - Smith's zokor, E. smithii

=== Extinct genera ===
- Siberosiphneus - Pliocene to Middle Pleistocene, Siberia and European Russia
- Episiphneus - Late Pliocene to Middle Pleistocene, Mongolia and northern China
- Pliosiphneus - Early to Middle Pliocene, China and Mongolia
- Prosiphneus - Late Miocene to Early Pliocene, China, Mongolia, and Siberia
