= Mole-rat =

Mole-rat or mole rat can refer to several groups of burrowing Old World rodents:

- Bathyergidae, a family of about 20 hystricognath species in six genera from Africa also called blesmols.
- Heterocephalus glaber, the naked mole-rat.
- Spalacidae, a family of about 30 muroid species in six genera from Eurasia and northeast Africa, including:
  - Tachyoryctes, a genus of about 15 species from Africa;
  - Blind mole rats (Spalacinae), a subfamily of about 15 living species in the genus Spalax from southeastern Europe, southwestern Asia, and northeastern Africa;
  - Zokors (Myospalacinae), occasionally called mole-rats, about eight species from central and eastern Asia.
- In the family Muridae:
  - Nesokia indica from southern and southwestern Asia and Egypt, also known as the short-tailed mole-rat.
  - Bandicota bengalensis from southern Asia, also known as the Indian mole-rat.
