= Rudd's African mole-rat =

Rudd's mole-rat

Scientific classification
- Domain: Eukaryota
- Kingdom: Animalia
- Phylum: Chordata
- Class: Mammalia
- Order: Rodentia
- Family: Spalacidae
- Genus: Tachyoryctes
- Species: T. ruddi

Binomial name
- Tachyoryctes ruddi Thomas, 1909

Species of rodent

Rudd's mole-rat (Tachyoryctes ruddi) is a species of rodent in the family Spalacidae. It is found in Kenya and Uganda. Its natural habitats are subtropical or tropical moist lowland forest, subtropical or tropical moist montane forest, subtropical or tropical high-altitude grassland, arable land, pastureland, plantations, and heavily degraded former forest.

Some taxonomic authorities consider it to be conspecific with the East African mole-rat.
