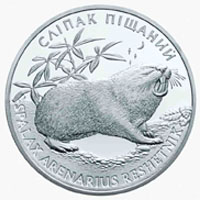
- Spalax arenarius on a Ukrainian coin issued in 2005

Conservation status
- Endangered (IUCN 3.1)

Scientific classification
- Kingdom: Animalia
- Phylum: Chordata
- Class: Mammalia
- Order: Rodentia
- Family: Spalacidae
- Genus: Spalax
- Species: S. arenarius

Binomial name
- Spalax arenarius Reshetnik, 1939

= Sandy blind mole-rat =

Species of rodent

The sandy blind mole-rat (Spalax arenarius) is an endangered species of rodent in the family Spalacidae. It is endemic to Ukraine.

== Taxonomy and evolution ==
It was first identified by Evdokia Reshetnik in 1939, as a subspecies of Spalax zemni (at the time called Spalax polonicus), and elevated to a species by S. Ognev in 1947. S. arenarius is most closely related to S. zemni, from which it separated when the movement of the Dnieper river cut off the Lower Dnieper Sands where it lives.

== Description ==
They are large moles, between 190 millimetres (7.5 in) and 275 millimetres (10.8 in) in length, and weigh between 380 grams (13 oz) and 660 grams (23 oz), with the males being larger and heavier than the females.

== Distribution and habitat ==
It is restricted to a very small region of southern Ukraine, on sandy habitats along the lower Dnieper River on the Black Sea coastal plain. The range, which is about 3,000 square kilometres (1,200 mi^{2}), is the smallest known of all Ukrainian mammals and may be the smallest of all European mammals. It inhabits moderately wet, sandy soils with low subterranean waters, in steppes dominated by absinth-grass or absinth-spurge, with sparse vegetation otherwise. It does not inhabit dry feathergrass steppe or moving sands.

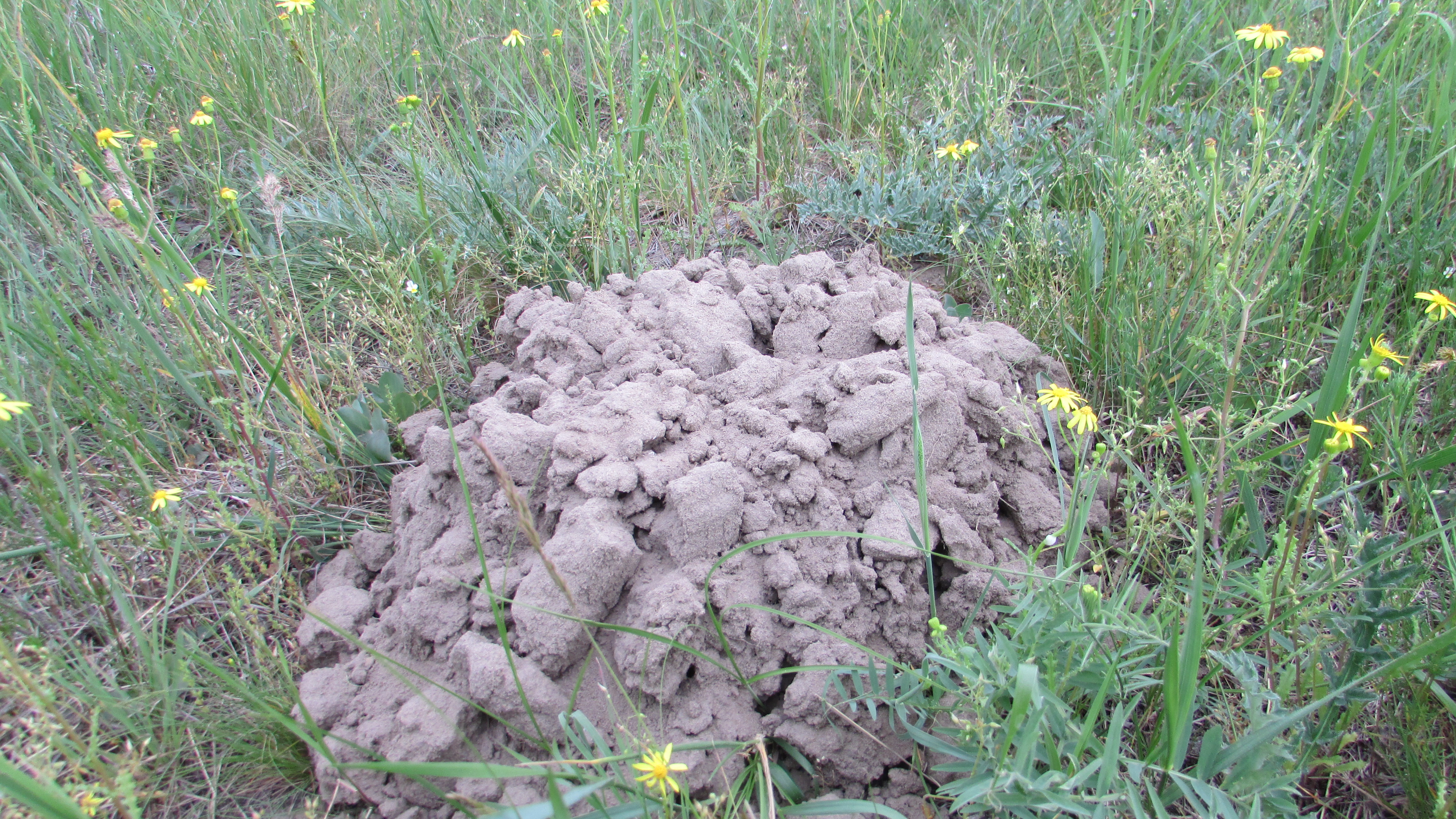
Burrow in Oleshky Sands National Nature Park

== Conservation status ==
As of the 2008 IUCN assessment, about 15,000 to 20,000 mature individuals were thought to exist. The primary segment of the population inhabits the Black Sea Biosphere Reserve, and where they were thought to have a stable population trend. However, populations outside of this protected area were thought to be declining. The primary threat to this species was habitat conversion by the afforestation of the sandy soils for stabilization and wood production.

The entire population of the species is found in areas affected by the Russo-Ukrainian War, which has led to an estimated 50% decline in their population over 2022 and 2023. The species was severely impacted by the destruction of the Kakhovka Dam, which led to the flooding of most of its range. Other impacts from the war include trenching, which affects the soil in which they dig, shelling, and fires.
