= Induced ovulation (animals) =

Ovulation in response to an external stimulus

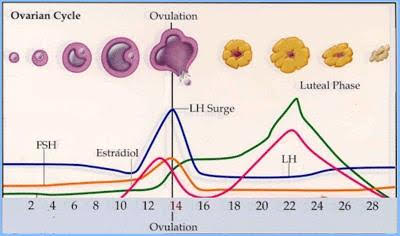
Ovulation

Induced ovulation occurs in some animal species that do not ovulate cyclically or spontaneously. Ovulation can be induced by externally-derived stimuli during or before mating, such as sperm, pheromones, or mechanical stimulation during copulation.

Ovulation occurs at the ovary surface and is described as the process in which an oocyte (female germ cell) is released from the follicle. Ovulation is a non-deleterious 'inflammatory response' which is initiated by a luteinizing hormone (LH) surge. The mechanism of ovulation varies between species. In humans the ovulation process occurs around day 14 of the menstrual cycle, this can also be referred to as 'cyclical spontaneous ovulation'. However the monthly menstruation process is typically linked to humans and primates, all other animal species ovulate by various other mechanisms.

Spontaneous ovulation is the ovulatory process in which the maturing ovarian follicles secrete ovarian steroids to generate pulsatile GnRH (the neuropeptide which controls all vertebrate reproductive function) release into the median eminence (the area which connects the hypothalamus to the anterior pituitary gland) to ultimately cause a pre-ovulatory LH surge. Spontaneously ovulating species go through menstrual cycles and are fertile at certain times based on what part of the cycle they are in. Species in which the females are spontaneous ovulators include rats, mice, guinea pigs, horse, pigs, sheep, monkeys, and humans.

Induced ovulation is the process in which the pre-ovulatory LH surge and therefore ovulation is induced by some component of coitus e.g. receipt of genital stimulation. Usually, spontaneous steroid-induced LH surges are not observed in induced ovulator species throughout their reproductive cycles, which indicates that GnRH release is absent or reduced due to lack of positive feedback action from steroid hormones. However, by contradiction, some spontaneously ovulating species can occasionally undergo mating-induced preovulatory LH surges. Species in which the females are induced ovulators include cats, rabbits, ferrets, and camels. In 1985, Chen et al., used Bactrian camels to investigate the factor(s) that induce ovulation during breeding season. They monitored the camel ovaries for ovulation by rectal palpation following insemination of semen samples. Chen et al., concluded that in this particular camel species ovulation was induced by the seminal plasma, and not by the spermatozoa.

== Evolution ==
Although the evolution of these two types of ovulation is not well understood, the type of ovulation that would be advantageous in some species can be understood by looking at social groups. Animals that have large, complex social groups benefit from spontaneous ovulation as only the best males get to breed with females. If there are few males suitable for breeding it makes sense to spread out the times at which females are fertile, therefore increasing the proportion in which conception occurs. This does not explain the evolution of ovulation in all species however, for example some species appear to show estrus synchronisation.

== Mechanism ==
In spontaneous ovulators, estrogen and progesterone secreted by the follicles as they grow and mature affects the release of GnRH, and therefore causes an LH surge. The LH surge then causes the release of the egg.

Ovulation is triggered in induced ovulators by an LH surge from the anterior pituitary that is induced during mating. Animals this has been recorded in include rabbits, voles, ferrets and camels. In some species such as the ferret, the duration of intromission has no effect on the LH surge, whereas in other species such as the cat these are related and higher levels of LH were produced by mating multiple times. In many species, for a LH surge to occur, little intromission is required.

The pathways in which information reaches the brain and causes GnRH release are not understood well; however, midbrain and brainstem noradrenergic neurones appear to be activated in response to intromission during mating. These neurones then go on to stimulate the mediobasal hypothalamic to release GnRH from the median eminence. Most experiments on GnRH and LH release have been focused on spontaneous ovulators, though there have been studies completed on some induced ovulators (e.g., rabbits, ferrets). From this, it appears that norepinephrine facilitates GnRH release in the rabbit and ferret and the locus coereuleus which is the part of the brain involved in conveying genital-somatosensory information to the GnRH neurones. Other substances that have similar effects include neuropeptide Y.

== Species ==
Many species have been found to be induced ovulators and the reasons for this are not always clear. However, one possible reason is that induced ovulation could provide a better reproductive potential for those species that typically have shorter life spans and less encounters resulting in lower mating opportunities throughout their lifetime. Other species may be 'facultatively-induced ovulators' meaning that while they can spontaneously ovulate, the cycle may speed up or slow down depending on the presence of males, females or mating.

Some rodents such as squirrels and mole-rats are known induced ovulators. In rats the East African mole rat and the Cape-Dune, Natal, Highvield and blind mole rats are known induced ovulators. These species require mating to stimulate the vagina and cervix, resulting in ovulation in the females. The East African mole rat has been found to have small spines on its penis which are also thought to contribute to this stimulation of induced ovulation.

The koala species are a lesser-known induced ovulator. The koalas require mating in which the presence of ejaculated semen is needed to stimulate the female to produce a LH surge (which would cause ovulation of a follicle). Unlike many other animals, simply being in the presence of a male koala is not enough to induce ovulation itself, nor is vaginal stimulation on its own sufficient to cause induced ovulation to occur.

Cats are another widely-known induced ovulator. After mating, the LH levels in female cats surge, and the time to ovulation can be predicted to occur between 1–2 days later.

Wolverines are other known induced ovulators which require physical mating to cause ovulation.

Induced ovulation occurs in various carnivoran species, including most felids and several species of mustelids. Many bear species are able to have induced ovulation including the grizzly bear, black bear and polar bear where both the presence of a male and mating itself are requirements for induced ovulation. However, there are some suggestions that mating is not as strict a requirement for ovulation in bears.

Japanese black bears are induced ovulators. It was observed that most females kept separate from males did not ovulate, whereas females kept in areas with male bears did. Mating between the bears caused elevated progesterone levels, and this was seen by increased progesterone levels measured in the bears in the months that followed the mating seasons. In Japanese black bears, the presence of a male was enough to cause a notable rise in progesterone levels even without mating. This could suggest that pheromonal/chemosensory factors could also contribute to induced ovulation in some species.

Induced ovulation is able to occur in some fish species. In China freshwater fish including a variety of carp types, bream and loach are able to be induced to ovulate by using agonists of dopamine. This induction of ovulation from drugs is able to cause a predictable ovulation period and is very beneficial to farming of these species.

== In cattle ==
The natural cycle of spontaneous ovulation occurs in species such as cows. There is a great demand for ovulation to be induced in cattle, as it allows farmers to synchronize their cattle to ovulate at the same time, helping improve the efficiency of dairy farming. Induced ovulation can be utilized during the warmer seasons to increase plasma progesterone and improve the fertility of the cattle. However, ovulation can only be induced in cows with mature follicles and merely initiates lutenization, it does not reduce the time for ovulation.

There are a number of methods that are used to induce ovulation in cattle such as: introducing a number of hormones such as prostaglandin, pfg2a. As well as releasing progesterone by intravaginal devices called CIDRs (Controlled Intravaginal Drug Release)

== In cats ==
Domestic cats are often described as induced ovulators. During intromission, the penis probably causes distension of the posterior vagina and induces release of gonadotropin releasing hormone (GnRH) from the hypothalamus via neuroendocrine reflexes. A surge of luteinising hormone (LH) occurs within minutes of mating. With multiple matings, the LH surge is greater and lasts longer than when only one mating occurs. There are reports of ovulation without mating in cats. Spontaneous ovulation not only occurs in cats, but occurs with some frequency. It appears that non-copulatory ovulation may be possible in response to a variety of visual, auditory or olfactory cues. It is more appropriate to consider domestic cats to be both an induced and spontaneous ovulator.

== In rabbits ==
It has been known since 1905 that domestic rabbits are physically induced ovulators, although they may also ovulate spontaneously. Early reports stated that simply having an oestrous doe in close proximity to a buck can induce ovulation, although there were no data presented in these early reports.

== In camelids ==
Dromedary camels (Camelus dromedarius), bactrian camels (Camelus bactrianus), llamas (Lama glama) and alpacas (Lama pacos) are all induced ovulators.

=== Bactrian camel ===
Bactrian camels ovulate after insemination into the vagina; it is the seminal plasma, but not the spermatozoa, which induces ovulation. Ovulation occurs in 87% of females after insemination: 66% ovulate within 36 hours and the rest by 48 hours (the same as natural mating). The least amount of semen required to elicit ovulation is about 1.0 ml.

=== Alpaca ===
In alpaca, follicles ovulate approximately 26 hours after coital stimulation. Mounting accompanied by intromission is necessary to provide adequate stimulation for LH release and subsequent ovulation. Deposition of semen, which contains ovulation-inducing factor (OIF), has been shown to increase the chance of pregnancy. Prolonged copulation, causing abrasion and inflammation of the uterus, may enhance absorption of OIF.
