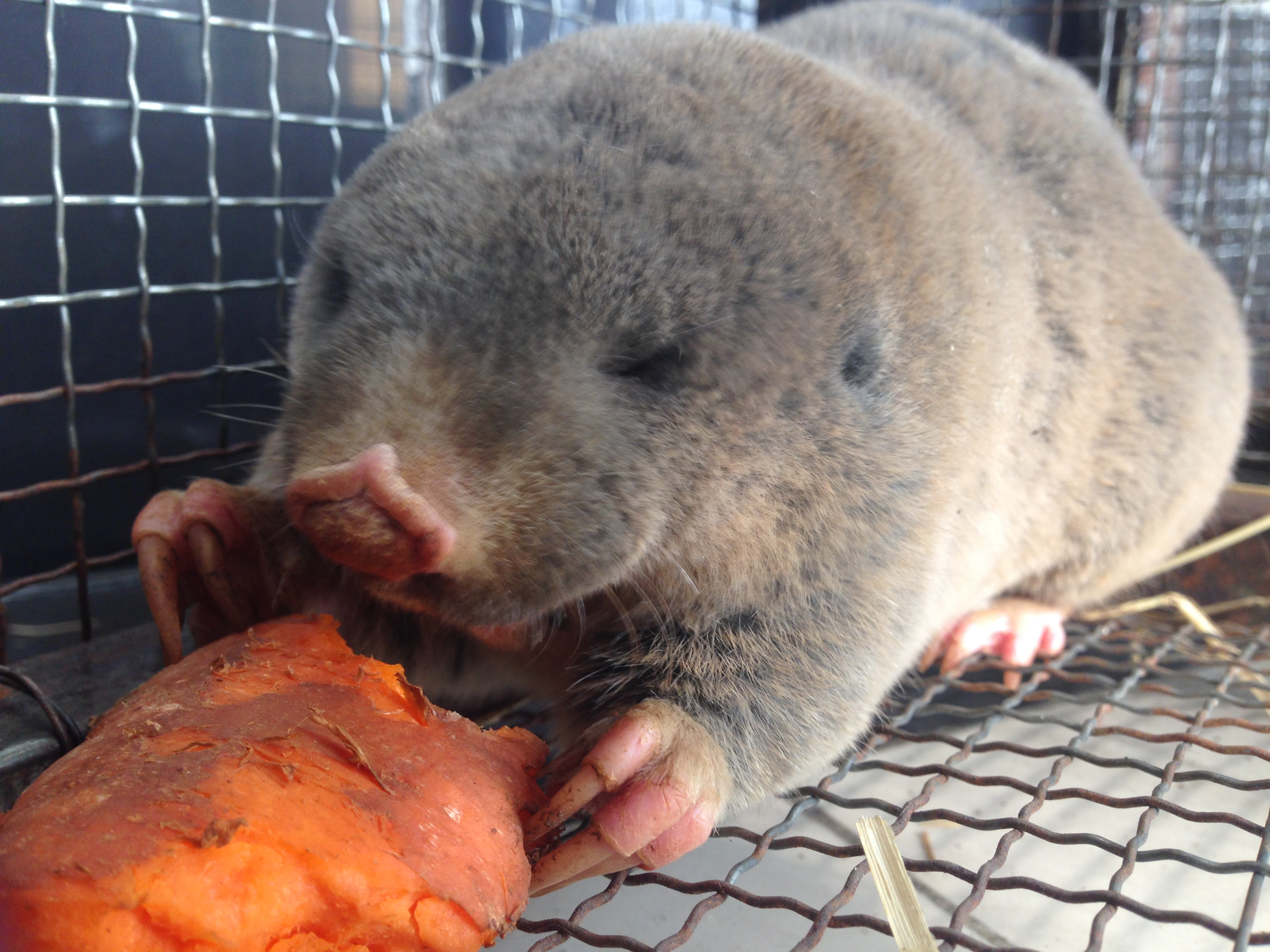
- Plateau zokor, (Eospalax fontanierii baileyi)

Scientific classification
- Domain: Eukaryota
- Kingdom: Animalia
- Phylum: Chordata
- Class: Mammalia
- Order: Rodentia
- Family: Spalacidae
- Subfamily: Myospalacinae
- Genus: Eospalax; G.M. Allen, 1938

Type genus
- Siphneus fontanieri

= Eospalax =

Genus of rodents

Eospalax is a genus of rodents in the family Spalacidae. It contains these species:

- Chinese zokor, E. fontanierii
- Rothschild's zokor, E. rothschildi
- Smith's zokor, E. smithii
