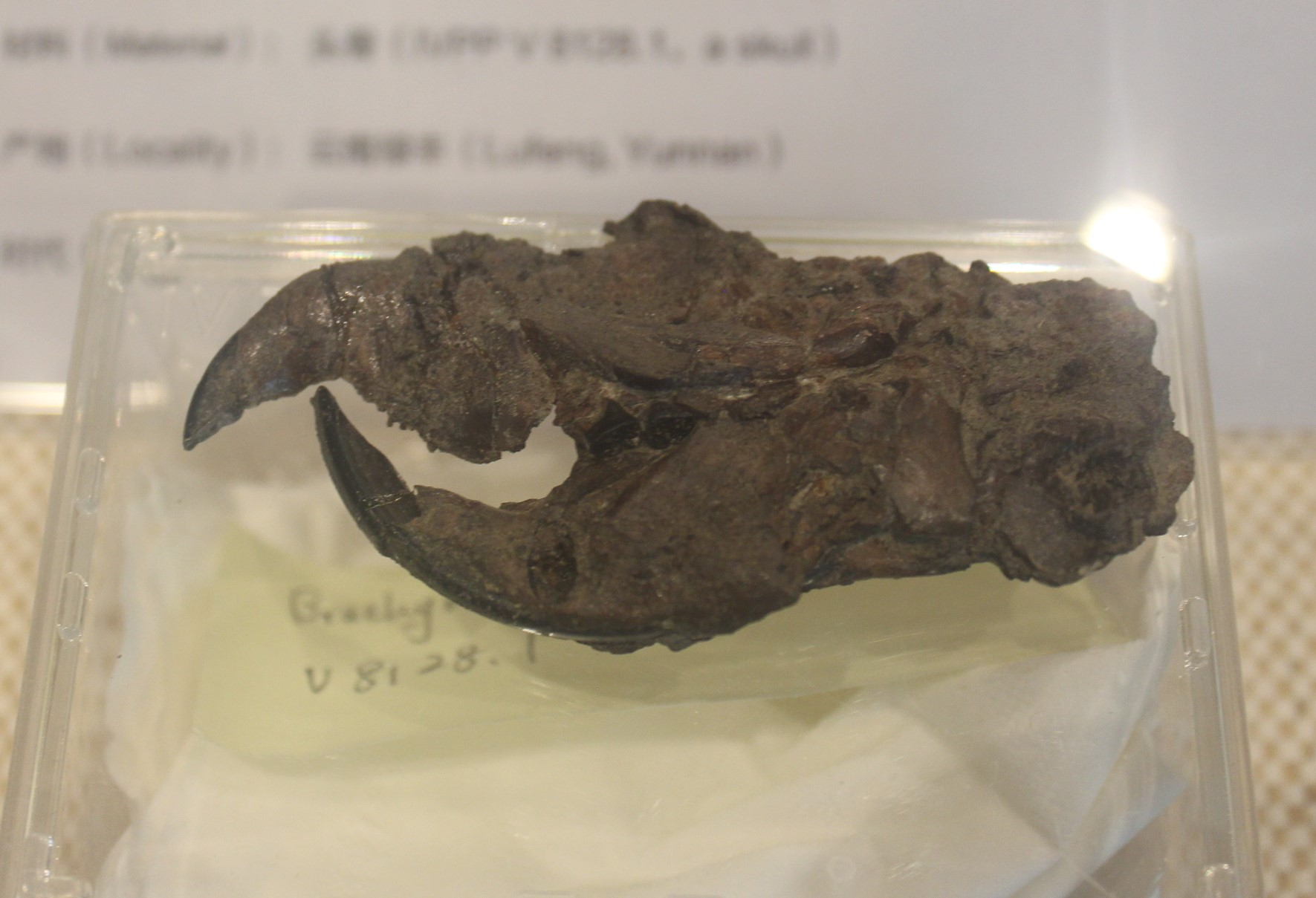
- Fossil skull (IVPP V8128.1) of B. tetracharax, Paleozoological Museum of China

Scientific classification
- Domain: Eukaryota
- Kingdom: Animalia
- Phylum: Chordata
- Class: Mammalia
- Order: Rodentia
- Family: Spalacidae
- Tribe: Rhizomyini
- Genus: †Brachyrhizomys; Teilhard de Jardin, 1942

Species
- 10 species

= Brachyrhizomys =

Brachyrhizomys Temporal range: Miocene to Pleistocene about 8.7-0.781 mya

Extinct genus of rodents

Brachyrhizomys is an extinct genus of ground-dwelling herbivorous rodent that lived in Miocene to Pleistocene of China and India.

== Species ==
- Brachyrhizomys blacki
- Brachyrhizomys choristos
- Brachyrhizomys hehoensis
- Brachyrhizomys micrurus
- Brachyrhizomys nagrii
- Brachyrhizomys naquensis
- Brachyrhizomys pilgrimi
- Brachyrhizomys pinjoricus
- Brachyrhizomys shansius
- Brachyrhizomys tetracharax
