= Kenyan African mole-rat =

Scientific classification
- Domain: Eukaryota
- Kingdom: Animalia
- Phylum: Chordata
- Class: Mammalia
- Order: Rodentia
- Family: Spalacidae
- Genus: Tachyoryctes
- Species: T. ibeanus

Binomial name
- Tachyoryctes ibeanus Thomas, 1900

Species of rodent

The Kenyan African mole-rat or Kenyan mole-rat (Tachyoryctes ibeanus) is a species of rodent in the family Spalacidae. It is endemic to Kenya. Its natural habitats are dry savanna, moist savanna, arable land, pastureland, plantations, rural gardens, urban areas, and heavily degraded former forest.

Some taxonomic authorities consider it to be conspecific with the East African mole-rat.
