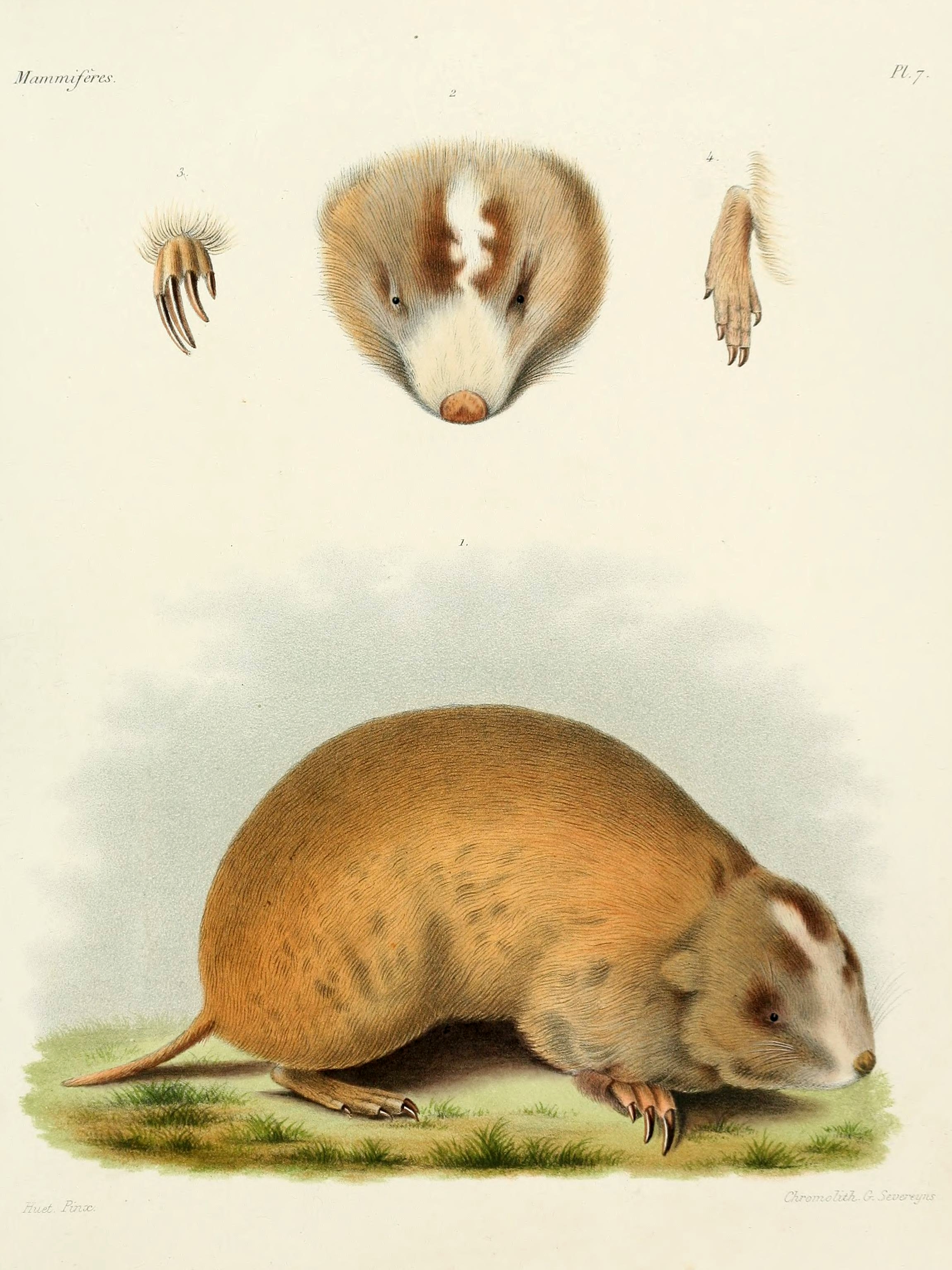

Conservation status
- Least Concern (IUCN 3.1)

Scientific classification
- Kingdom: Animalia
- Phylum: Chordata
- Class: Mammalia
- Order: Rodentia
- Family: Spalacidae
- Genus: Eospalax
- Species: E. fontanierii

Binomial name
- Eospalax fontanierii (Milne-Edwards, 1867)

Synonyms
- Myospalax fontanieri (Milne-Edwards, 1867)

= Chinese zokor =

Species of rodent

The Chinese zokor (Eospalax fontanierii) is a species of rodent in the family Spalacidae. It is endemic to China, ranging from Qinghai Province eastwards to Beijing in steppe and alpine grasslands. Henri Milne-Edwards first described it in 1867. Eradication programs in the 1990s in Qinghai Province resulted in a population decline to less than a third of the former population. It is considered common and has been assessed as Least Concern by IUCN.

An average adult weighs 256 g (9.0 oz) and newborn young weigh 9 g (0.32 oz).

== Description ==
The Chinese zokor is a medium-sized, burrowing rodent, with a stocky build and a very short, conical tail. The head-and-body length is between 155 and 245 mm (6 and 10 in) and the tail between 40 and 62 mm (1.6 and 2.4 in). The weight varies between 150 and 620 g (5 and 22 oz). The fur is soft and dense, covering the eyes and tiny ears. There is a white flash on the forehead. The upper parts are a dark reddish-brown, each of the hairs having a greyish-black base. The underparts are greyish-black, the hairs having reddish-brown tips, and the tail has only a few hairs. Adaptations to its burrowing lifestyle include large incisors for loosening soil, rootless molars that grow throughout the animal's life, and spade-like front paws with long recurved nails.

== Distribution and habitat ==
This species is endemic to central and eastern China. Its range includes the provinces of Gansu, Qinghai, Ningxia, Shaanxi, Sichuan, Shanxi, Hebei, Henan, Shandong, Inner Mongolia and Beijing. It is found in steppes, shrubby areas, upland pastures, meadowland, agricultural land, wasteland, road verges and banks. On the Tibetan steppe, it shares its range with other burrowing mammals such as the plateau pika (Ochotona curzoniae) and various voles, Microtus spp.

== Ecology ==
Chinese zokors live solitarily underground in extensive burrows that they excavate, leaving evidence of their presence in the form of mounds of excavated material on the surface of the ground. Near the surface are feeding burrows providing the zokors with access to the roots and stems on which they feed. Deeper underground are living burrows with large storage chambers and nesting chambers. Tunnels may extend as far as 100 m (330 ft) and are often 25 to 48 cm (10 to 19 in) deep and sometimes much deeper. Accumulations of up to 30 kg (66 lb) of vegetable matter have been found in burrows but a more normal size store is about one tenth of this size. The zokors show a preference for the underground storage organs of plants but also eat a broad range of roots and shoots of grasses, herbs and a few shrubby plants.

Zokors are active throughout the year. Even though the temperature conditions above ground vary greatly, in the burrow the temperature is much less extreme and these zokors do not hibernate in winter, although their activity level is reduced. In spring, male zokors extend their tunnels and mate with females when their tunnel systems intersect. Females may be promiscuous and mate with more than one male. The female produces a single litter each year usually consisting of two or three young, but ranging from one to five. More female offspring are born than males, and the lactation period is about fifty days.

The actions of zokors have a significant effect on the ecology of an area. The physical actions of the animal loosens the surface soil, damaging roots and stems and reducing plant biomass. The mounds of excavated soil may overlay plants but provide colonisation opportunities for successional plant species to become established. The deep soil brought to the surface may be lower in nutrients (nitrogen and phosphorus) than the surrounding soil, and in general, biomass production is lower in areas occupied by zokors for ten years than in comparable zokor-free areas.

After an attempt to reduce populations in the province of Qinghai by poisoning had unintended consequences on the environment, it is now considered that the Chinese zokor is an ecosystem engineer, responsible in part for maintaining the health and stability of the environment. These animals are an important link in the food chain and their loss causes a cascading effect on other organisms. They also serve a function in loosening and aerating the soil, assisting in water retention and preventing soil erosion.

== Status ==
E. fontanierii is a common species, has a wide range and is presumed to have a large total population. No particular threat to the animal has been detected and it lives in a number of protected areas and is tolerant of habitat disturbance. It was targeted in the province of Qinghai as a pest and the population there was reduced, but otherwise, any decline in total population is likely to be limited and the International Union for Conservation of Nature has assessed the zokor's conservation status as being of "least concern".
