= Rothschild's zokor =

Conservation status
- Least Concern (IUCN 3.1)

Scientific classification
- Kingdom: Animalia
- Phylum: Chordata
- Class: Mammalia
- Order: Rodentia
- Family: Spalacidae
- Genus: Eospalax
- Species: E. rothschildi

Binomial name
- Eospalax rothschildi (Thomas, 1911)

Synonyms
- Myospalax rothschildi Thomas, 1911

Species of rodent

The Rothschild's zokor (Eospalax rothschildi) is a species of rodent in the family Spalacidae. It is endemic to China.
