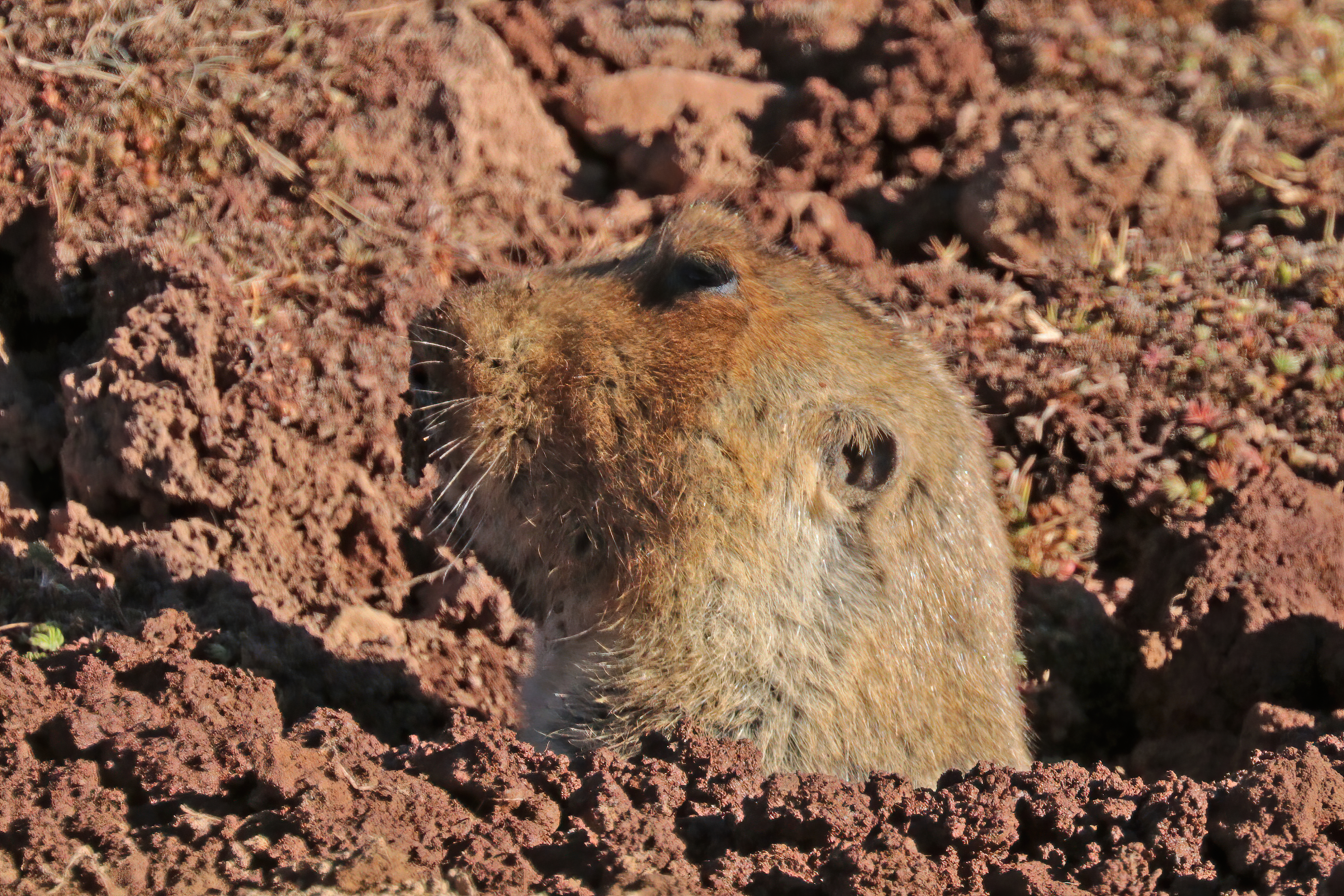
- Giant root-rat (T. macrocephalus), Ethiopia

Scientific classification
- Kingdom: Animalia
- Phylum: Chordata
- Class: Mammalia
- Infraclass: Placentalia
- Order: Rodentia
- Family: Spalacidae
- Tribe: Tachyoryctini; Miller & Gidley, 1918
- Genus: Tachyoryctes; Rüppell, 1835

Type species
- Bathyergus splendens

Species
- Tachyoryctes ankoliae Tachyoryctes annectens Tachyoryctes audax Tachyoryctes daemon Tachyoryctes ibeanus Tachyoryctes macrocephalus Tachyoryctes naivashae Tachyoryctes rex Tachyoryctes ruandae Tachyoryctes ruddi Tachyoryctes spalacinus Tachyoryctes splendens Tachyoryctes storeyi

Synonyms
- Chrysomys Gray, 1843

= Tachyoryctes =

Tachyoryctes Temporal range: Late Pliocene - Recent

Genus of rodents

Tachyoryctes is a genus of rodent in the family Spalacidae. It contains the following species:

- Ankole African mole-rat (T. ankoliae)
- Mianzini African mole-rat (T. annectens)
- Aberdare Mountains African mole-rat (T. audax)
- Demon African mole-rat (T. daemon)
- Kenyan African mole-rat (T. ibeanus)
- Giant root-rat (T. macrocephalus)
- Navivasha African mole-rat (T. naivashae)
- King African mole-rat (T. rex)
- Rwanda African mole-rat (T. ruandae)
- Rudd's African mole-rat (T. ruddi)
- Embi African mole-rat (T. spalacinus)
- Northeast African mole-rat (T. splendens)
- Storey's African mole-rat (T. storeyi)

Some authorities place all the species in this genus except T. macrocephalus in one species, the East African mole-rat, in which case T. splendens is used for the entire group. This taxonomy is followed by the IUCN Red List.
