= Storey's African mole-rat =

Scientific classification
- Domain: Eukaryota
- Kingdom: Animalia
- Phylum: Chordata
- Class: Mammalia
- Order: Rodentia
- Family: Spalacidae
- Genus: Tachyoryctes
- Species: T. storeyi

Binomial name
- Tachyoryctes storeyi Thomas, 1909

Species of mammal

Storey's African mole-rat (Tachyoryctes storeyi) is a species of rodent in the family Spalacidae endemic to Kenya. Its natural habitat is subtropical or tropical dry lowland grassland.

Some taxonomic authorities consider it to be conspecific with the East African mole-rat.
