= Smith's zokor =

Conservation status
- Least Concern (IUCN 3.1)

Scientific classification
- Kingdom: Animalia
- Phylum: Chordata
- Class: Mammalia
- Order: Rodentia
- Family: Spalacidae
- Genus: Eospalax
- Species: E. smithii

Binomial name
- Eospalax smithii (Thomas, 1911)

Synonyms
- Myospalax smithii Thomas, 1911

Species of rodent

Smith's zokor (Eospalax smithii) is a species of rodent in the family Spalacidae that is endemic to China.
