= Ankole African mole-rat =

Ankole mole-rat

Scientific classification
- Domain: Eukaryota
- Kingdom: Animalia
- Phylum: Chordata
- Class: Mammalia
- Order: Rodentia
- Family: Spalacidae
- Genus: Tachyoryctes
- Species: T. ankoliae

Binomial name
- Tachyoryctes ankoliae Thomas, 1909

Species of mammal

The Ankole mole-rat or Ankole African mole-rat (Tachyoryctes ankoliae) is a species of rodent in the family Spalacidae found in southwestern Uganda and northwestern Tanzania. Its natural habitats are moist savanna and arable land. Some taxonomic authorities consider it to be conspecific with the East African mole-rat.
