= Navivasha African mole-rat =

Naivasha African mole-rat

Scientific classification
- Domain: Eukaryota
- Kingdom: Animalia
- Phylum: Chordata
- Class: Mammalia
- Order: Rodentia
- Family: Spalacidae
- Genus: Tachyoryctes
- Species: T. naivashae

Binomial name
- Tachyoryctes naivashae Thomas, 1909

Species of rodent

The Naivasha African mole-rat (Tachyoryctes naivashae) is a species of rodent in the family Spalacidae. It is endemic to Kenya. Its natural habitats are subtropical or tropical moist montane forests, moist savanna, arable land, and pastureland.

Some taxonomic authorities consider it to be conspecific with the East African mole-rat.
