= Rwanda African mole-rat =

Scientific classification
- Kingdom: Animalia
- Phylum: Chordata
- Class: Mammalia
- Order: Rodentia
- Family: Spalacidae
- Genus: Tachyoryctes
- Species: T. ruandae

Binomial name
- Tachyoryctes ruandae Lönnberg & Gyldenstolpe, 1925

Species of rodent

The Rwanda mole-rat (Tachyoryctes ruandae) is a species of rodent in the family Spalacidae found in Burundi, the Democratic Republic of the Congo, and Rwanda. Its natural habitats are subtropical or tropical moist montane forests, subtropical or tropical high-altitude grassland, arable land, pastureland, plantations, rural gardens, and heavily degraded former forest.

Some taxonomic authorities consider it to be conspecific with the East African mole-rat.
