= Embi African mole-rat =

Embi mole-rat

Scientific classification
- Domain: Eukaryota
- Kingdom: Animalia
- Phylum: Chordata
- Class: Mammalia
- Order: Rodentia
- Family: Spalacidae
- Genus: Tachyoryctes
- Species: T. spalacinus

Binomial name
- Tachyoryctes spalacinus Thomas, 1909

Species of rodent

The Embi mole-rat (Tachyoryctes spalacinus) is a species of rodent in the family Spalacidae endemic to Kenya. Its natural habitats are subtropical or tropical moist montane forests, moist savanna, arable land, pastureland, plantations, and heavily degraded former forest.

Some taxonomic authorities consider it to be conspecific with the East African mole-rat.
