= Schauenberg's index =

Ratio of skull length to cranial capacity

Schauenberg's index is the ratio of skull length to cranial capacity. This index was introduced by Paul Schauenberg in 1969 as a method to identify European wildcat (Felis silvestris) skulls and distinguish them from domestic cat (Felis catus) skulls.
