= Mianzini African mole-rat =

Scientific classification
- Domain: Eukaryota
- Kingdom: Animalia
- Phylum: Chordata
- Class: Mammalia
- Order: Rodentia
- Family: Spalacidae
- Genus: Tachyoryctes
- Species: T. annectens

Binomial name
- Tachyoryctes annectens (Thomas, 1891)

Species of rodent

The Mianzini mole-rat or Mianzini African mole-rat (Tachyoryctes annectens) is a species of rodent in the family Spalacidae endemic to Kenya. Its natural habitats are dry savanna, pastureland, and rural gardens. Some taxonomic authorities consider it to be conspecific with the East African mole-rat.
