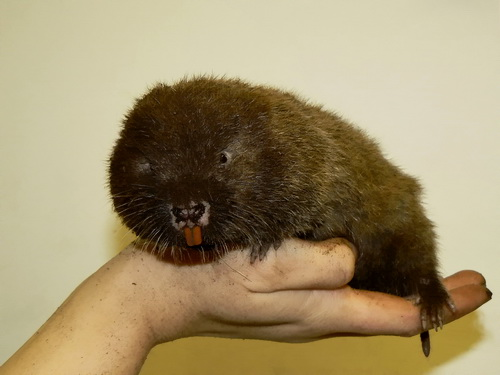

Conservation status
- Least Concern (IUCN 3.1)

Scientific classification
- Kingdom: Animalia
- Phylum: Chordata
- Class: Mammalia
- Order: Rodentia
- Family: Spalacidae
- Genus: Cannomys; Thomas, 1915
- Species: C. badius

Binomial name
- Cannomys badius (Hodgson, 1841)
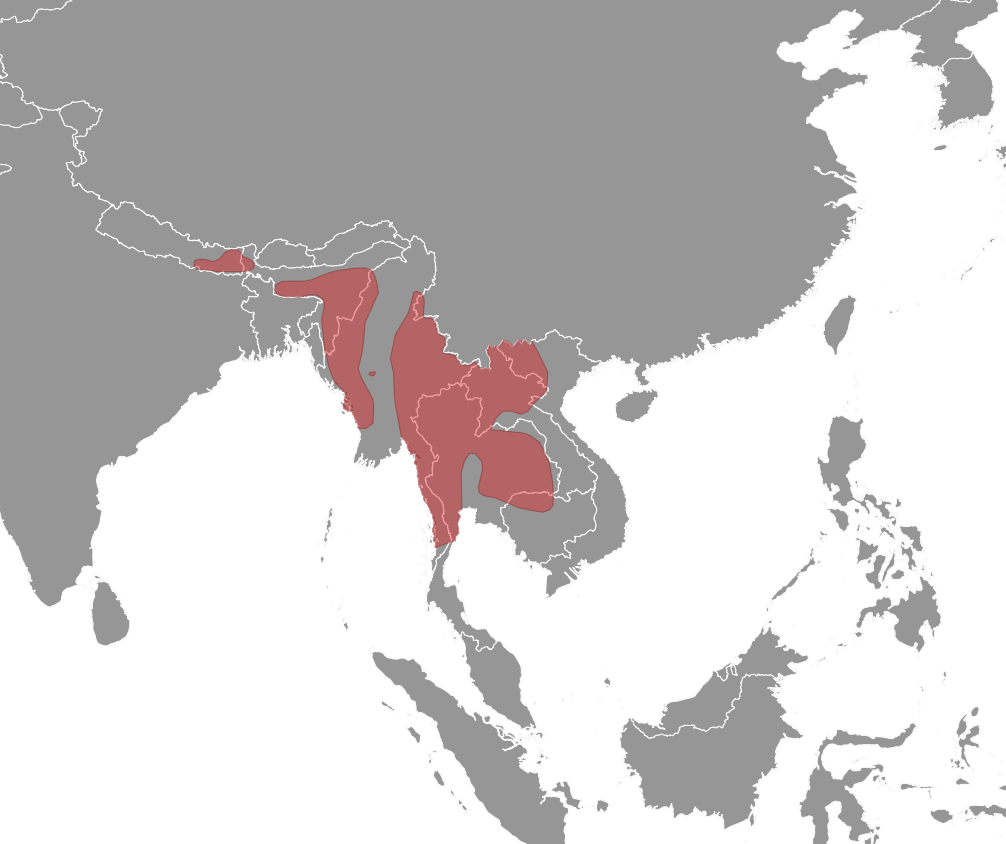

= Lesser bamboo rat =

Species of rodent

The lesser bamboo rat (Cannomys badius) is a species of rodent in the family Spalacidae. It is monotypic within the genus Cannomys. It is found in Bangladesh, Bhutan, Cambodia, China, India, Myanmar, Nepal, and Thailand.

== Description ==
Cannomys badius drawing

The lesser bamboo rat is a small, stocky mole-like rat. It reaches a length of about 200 mm (8 in) with a tail of around 60 mm (2 in), weighing between 210 and 340 grams (7.4 and 12.0 oz). The ears are small and completely hidden in the coat. The fur is soft and dense, reddish-brown to greyish-brown on the upper parts and rather paler and thinner on the underparts. Sometimes, white stripes are on the crown of the head or some white on the throat. The tail has a few hairs. Lesser bamboo rats have a robust, cylindrical body, small ears and eyes, and short, stout legs.

== Behaviour ==
The lesser bamboo rat is a burrowing animal usually found in bamboo groves in mountainous areas, but also occurring in woodland, plantations, and disturbed ground. The burrow entrance may be at the foot of a tree, under a clump of bamboo, in a bank, or in the open. Excavated earth is flung up in a mound at the entrance of the tunnel and further mounds occur at intervals along the course of the burrow. The main tunnel runs horizontally beneath the surface and may reach a depth of 60 cm (24 in) and total length as long as 58 m (190 ft). It ends in a roomy nesting chamber. When the animal is underground, the entrance of the burrow is plugged with earth.

The lesser bamboo rat emerges above ground at dusk to forage for plant material such as shoots, especially of bamboo, and roots. These rats become sexually mature at the age of one year and females produce litters of two to five offspring after a gestation period of about six weeks. Weaning takes place some eight weeks later.

== Status ==
The lesser bamboo rat has a wide range and is abundant in places. The threats it faces include being hunted for food and killed as a pest in rubber plantations. The International Union for Conservation of Nature has listed its conservation status as being of "least concern".
