= Spalacidae =

Spalacidae Temporal range: Early Miocene–Recent
- Giant root-rat, Tachyoryctes macrocephalus

Scientific classification
- Kingdom: Animalia
- Phylum: Chordata
- Class: Mammalia
- Order: Rodentia
- Superfamily: Muroidea
- Family: Spalacidae; Gray, 1821

Type genus
- Spalax Güldenstädt, 1770

Subfamilies
- Spalacinae; Myospalacinae; Rhizomyinae
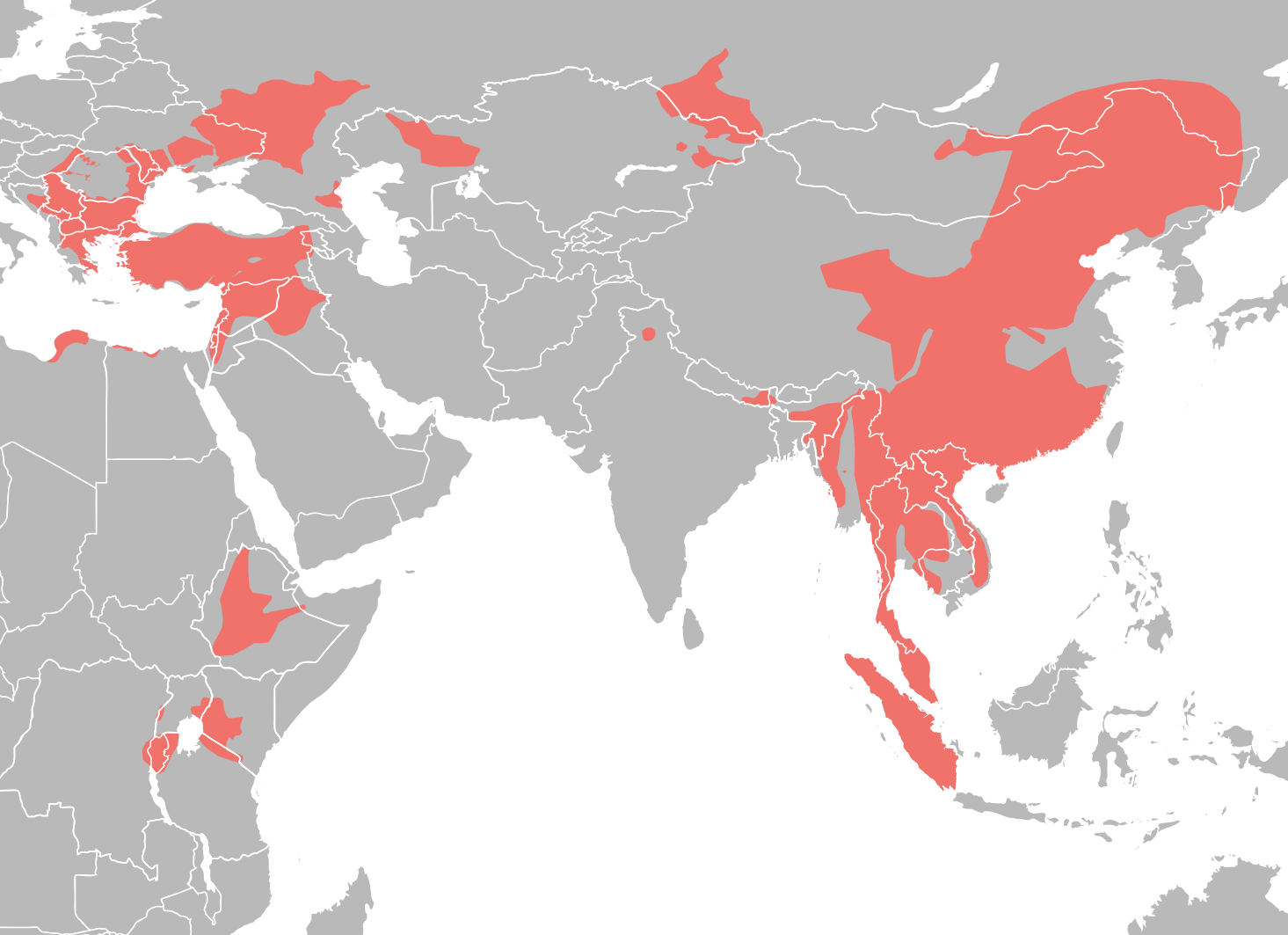
- Spalacidae distribution

Family of rodents

The Spalacidae, or spalacids, are a family of rodents in the large and complex superfamily Muroidea. They are native to eastern Asia, the Horn of Africa, the Middle East, and southeastern Europe. It includes the blind mole-rats, bamboo rats, mole-rats, and zokors. This family represents the oldest split (excluding perhaps the Platacanthomyidae) in the muroid superfamily, and comprises animals adapted to a subterranean way of life. These rodents were thought to have evolved adaptations to living underground independently until recent phylogenetic studies demonstrated they form a monophyletic group. Members of the Spalacidae are often placed in the family Muridae along with all other members of the Muroidea.

== Characteristics ==
Spalacids are mouse- to rat-sized rodents, adapted to burrowing and living underground. They have short limbs, wedge-shaped skulls, strong neck muscles, large incisor teeth, and small eyes and external ears. In the zokors, which dig primarily with their feet, rather than their teeth, the front claws are also massively enlarged. These features are least extreme in the bamboo rats, which spend at least some of their time above ground, foraging for food. They are most highly developed in the blind mole-rats, whose eyes are completely covered by skin, and entirely lack external ears or tails.

All of the spalacid species dig extensive burrows, which may include storage chambers for food, latrine chambers, and breeding nests. They are generally solitary animals, and do not share their tunnel complexes with other individuals. All the species are herbivores, feeding on roots, bulbs, and tubers.

They give birth to litters of up to six young after a gestation period between three and seven weeks, depending on the species. As with many other muroids, the young are born blind, hairless, and helpless. They may stay with the mother for several months before setting off to establish their own burrows, although some species disperse as soon as they are weaned.

=== Characteristics ===
Norris et al. listed several characteristics present in all members of this family which distinguish them from the rest of the muroids, (the clade Eumuroida). These are "the reduction or absence of external eyes, reduced pinnae, stocky body, short tail (<50% head and body length), broad rostrum, triangular-shaped braincase, infraorbital canal ovoid shape and does not extend ventrally to the roof of the palate, zygomatic plate absent or much reduced, nasolacrimal canal inside infraorbital canal, incisive foramina small to medium-sized, extensive neck musculature and prominent points of attachment on the occipitum, minimal reduction in M3 relative to M1 and M2, and a distinct orientation of the manubrium of the malleus bone." Spalacid genomes also share a derived filovirus-like nucleoprotein element with an open reading frame.

== Classification ==
The spalacids are classified in three subfamilies, six genera, and 37 species.

Family Spalacidae

- Genus †Dekamyarion Van de Weerd & Wessels, 2026
  - †Dekamyarion oculatus
  - †Dekamyarion ruber
- Subfamily Myospalacinae - zokors
  - Genus Myospalax
    - Myospalax myospalax species group
      - False zokor, M. aspalax
      - Siberian zokor, M. myospalax
    - Myospalax psilurus species group
      - Transbaikal zokor, M. psilurus
  - Genus Eospalax
    - Chinese zokor, E. fontanierii
    - Rothschild's zokor, E. rothschildi
    - Smith's zokor, E. smithii
- Subfamily Rhizomyinae
  - Tribe Rhizomyini - bamboo rats
    - Genus Rhizomys
      - Hoary bamboo rat, R. pruinosus
      - Chinese bamboo rat, R. sinensis
      - Large bamboo rat, R. sumatrensis
    - Genus Cannomys
      - Lesser bamboo rat, C. badius
    - †Genus Brachyrhizomys (Miocene to Pleistocene)
  - Tribe Tachyoryctini
    - Genus Tachyoryctes - African mole-rats
      - Ankole African mole-rat, T. ankoliae
      - Mianzini African mole-rat, T. annectens
      - Aberdare Mountains African mole-rat, T. audax
      - Demon African mole-rat, T. daemon
      - Kenyan African mole-rat, T. ibeanus
      - Giant root-rat, T. macrocephalus
      - Navivasha African mole-rat, Tachyoryctes naivashae
      - King African mole-rat, T. rex
      - Rwanda African mole-rat, T. ruandae
      - Rudd's African mole-rat, T. ruddi
      - Embi African mole-rat, T. spalacinus
      - Northeast African mole-rat, T. splendens
      - Storey's African mole-rat, T. storeyi
- Subfamily Spalacinae - blind mole-rats
  - Genus Spalax
    - Mehely's blind mole-rat, S. antiquus
    - Sandy blind mole-rat, S. arenarius
    - Giant blind mole-rat, S. giganteus
    - Bukovina blind mole-rat, S. graecus
    - Oltenia blind mole-rat, S. istricus (possibly extinct)
    - Greater blind mole-rat, S. microphthalmus
    - Kazakhstan blind mole-rat, S. uralensis
    - Podolsk blind mole-rat, S. zemni
  - Genus Nannospalax - small-bodied mole-rats
    - Subgenus Nannospalax
      - Middle East blind mole-rat or Palestine mole-rat, N. ehrenbergi
    - Subgenus Mesospalax
      - Lesser blind mole-rat, N. leucodon
      - Anatolian blind mole-rat or Nehring's blind mole-rat, N. xanthodon

== Bibliography ==
- Jansa, S. A. and M. Weksler. 2004. Phylogeny of muroid rodents: relationships within and among major lineages as determined by IRBP gene sequences. Molecular Phylogenetics and Evolution, 31:256-276.
- Michaux, J., A. Reyes, and F. Catzeflis. 2001. Evolutionary history of the most speciose mammals: molecular phylogeny of muroid rodents. Molecular Biology and Evolution, 17:280-293.
- Steppan, S. J., R. A. Adkins, and J. Anderson. 2004. Phylogeny and divergence date estimates of rapid radiations in muroid rodents based on multiple nuclear genes. Systematic Biology, 53:533-553.
