= Aberdare Mountains African mole-rat =

Scientific classification
- Domain: Eukaryota
- Kingdom: Animalia
- Phylum: Chordata
- Class: Mammalia
- Order: Rodentia
- Family: Spalacidae
- Genus: Tachyoryctes
- Species: T. audax

Binomial name
- Tachyoryctes audax Thomas, 1910

Species of rodent

The Aberdare Mountains African mole-rat (Tachyoryctes audax) is a species of rodent in the family Spalacidae endemic to Kenya. Its natural habitats are subtropical or tropical moist montane forests and subtropical or tropical high-elevation grassland. Some taxonomic authorities consider it to be conspecific with the East African mole-rat.
