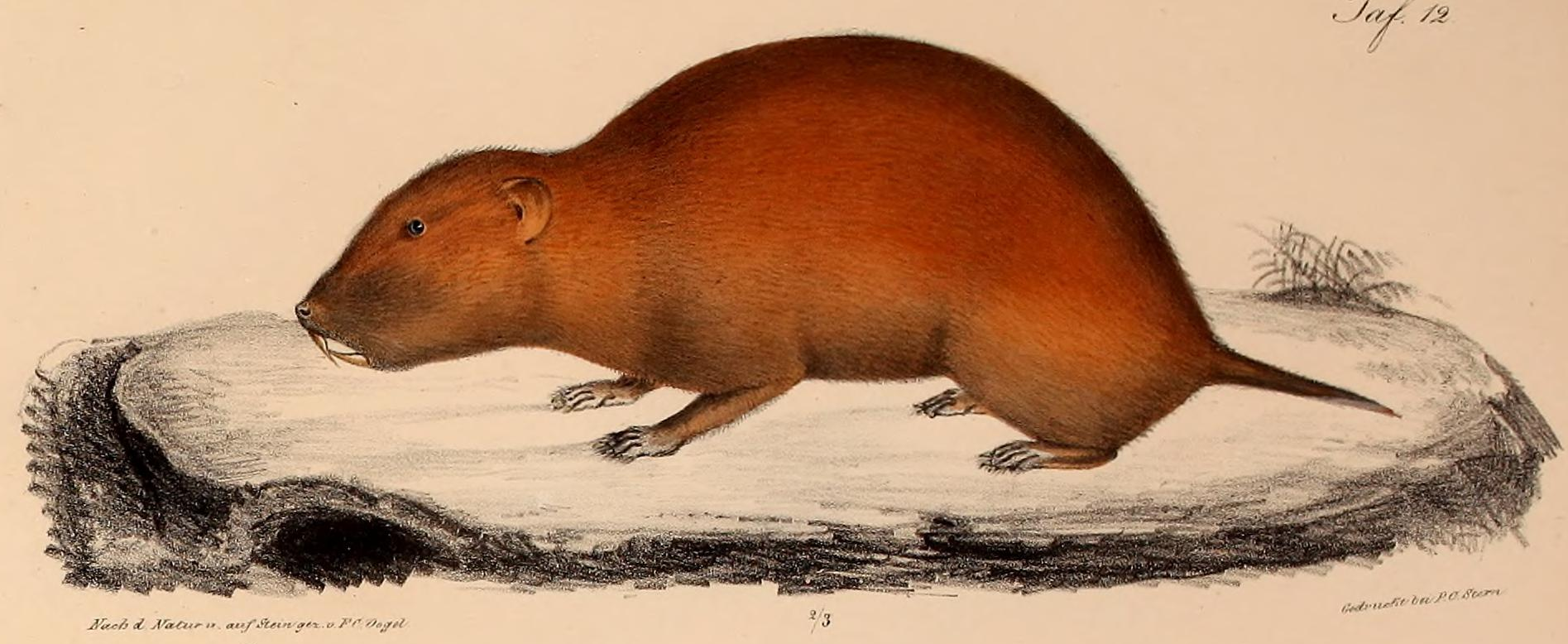

Conservation status
- Least Concern (IUCN 3.1)

Scientific classification
- Kingdom: Animalia
- Phylum: Chordata
- Class: Mammalia
- Order: Rodentia
- Family: Spalacidae
- Genus: Tachyoryctes
- Species: T. splendens

Binomial name
- Tachyoryctes splendens (Rüppell, 1835)

= Northeast African mole-rat =

Species of rodent

The northeast African mole-rat (Tachyoryctes splendens) is a species of rodent in the family Spalacidae and is found in Ethiopia, Somalia, and northwest Kenya. Its natural habitats are subtropical or tropical moist montane forests, dry savanna, high-altitude shrubland and grassland. It lives a solitary existence underground and produces a small litter of pups twice a year, in the two rainy seasons. Some taxonomic authorities lump this species, along with a number of others in the genus, in which case the English name East African mole-rat is used.

== Distribution and habitat ==
The northeast African mole-rat is native to upland areas of Ethiopia, Somalia, and northwest Kenya. It is found at elevations of up to 3,300 metres (10,800 ft) in Ethiopia and up to 3,000 metres (9,800 ft) in other parts of its range. It is an adaptable species and able to live in a range of habitats including savanna, moist tropical forest, agricultural land, pasture, coffee plantations and gardens.

== Behaviour ==
The northeast African mole-rat is a fossorial species and lives a solitary life in a network of burrows. African mole-rats mainly use their bulging teeth, nose, and top of their head to dig channels underground. Some researchers found that their olfactory systems have increased surface area and are highly complex, an evolved trait that may have occurred due to their lifestyle of living in a community with less individuals.

Female mole-rats become sexually mature at about 120 days and the average time between successive litters is around 173 days. The average size of litters is about two. The arrival of the young is synchronized with the middle of the rainy seasons which occur from April to July and again from November to December. Sometimes areas where this mole-rat lives can become flooded. Tests have shown that when this happens, the northeast African mole-rat can swim for two minutes or more, walk overground for up to 80 metres (260 ft) at 7 metres (23 ft) per minute and dig a new burrow. The researchers hypothesized that flooding might encourage the animal to disperse to new areas and that the wet ground would make digging the new burrow easier.

They can produce seismic signals by striking its head against the ceiling of their tunnels to communicate. These signals can be fast, probably for identification of individuals, or slow, maybe as a warning.

== Status ==
The northeast African mole-rat is common across most of its range and its population seems stable. It does not face any major threats and for these reasons, the IUCN lists it as being of "Least Concern" in its Red List of Threatened Species, although the IUCN has evaluated the species in the larger view of the East African mole-rat, lumping a number of species in the genus.
