= East African mole-rat =

East African mole-rat has been split into the following species:

- Northeast African mole-rat, Tachyoryctes splendens
- Ankole African mole-rat, Tachyoryctes ankoliae
- Mianzini African mole-rat, Tachyoryctes annectens
- Aberdare Mountains African mole-rat, Tachyoryctes audax
- Demon African mole-rat, Tachyoryctes daemon
- Kenyan African mole-rat, Tachyoryctes ibeanus
- Navivasha African mole-rat, Tachyoryctes naivashae
- King African mole-rat, Tachyoryctes rex
- Rwanda African mole-rat, Tachyoryctes ruandae
- Embi African mole-rat, Tachyoryctes spalacinus
- Storey's African mole-rat, Tachyoryctes storeyi
