= Transbaikal (disambiguation) =

Transbaikal or Trans-Baikal may refer to:

- Transbaikal
- Transbaikal Cossack Host
- Transbaikal Front
- Transbaikal Military District
- Transbaikal zokor
- Transbaikal Krai
- White movement in Transbaikal

== See also ==
- Lake Baikal
