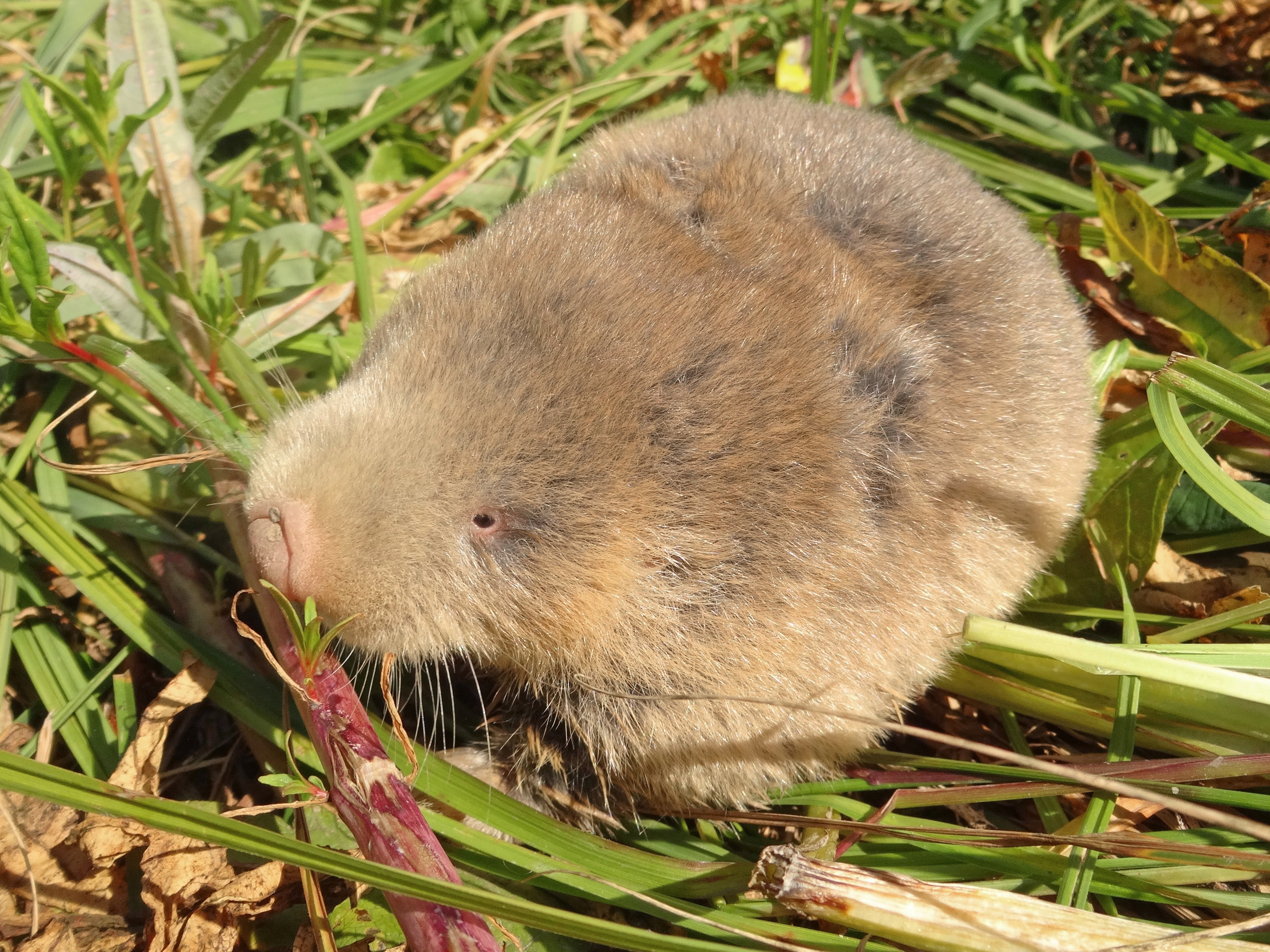

Conservation status
- Least Concern (IUCN 3.1)

Scientific classification
- Kingdom: Animalia
- Phylum: Chordata
- Class: Mammalia
- Order: Rodentia
- Family: Spalacidae
- Genus: Myospalax
- Species: M. myospalax

Binomial name
- Myospalax myospalax (Laxmann, 1773)
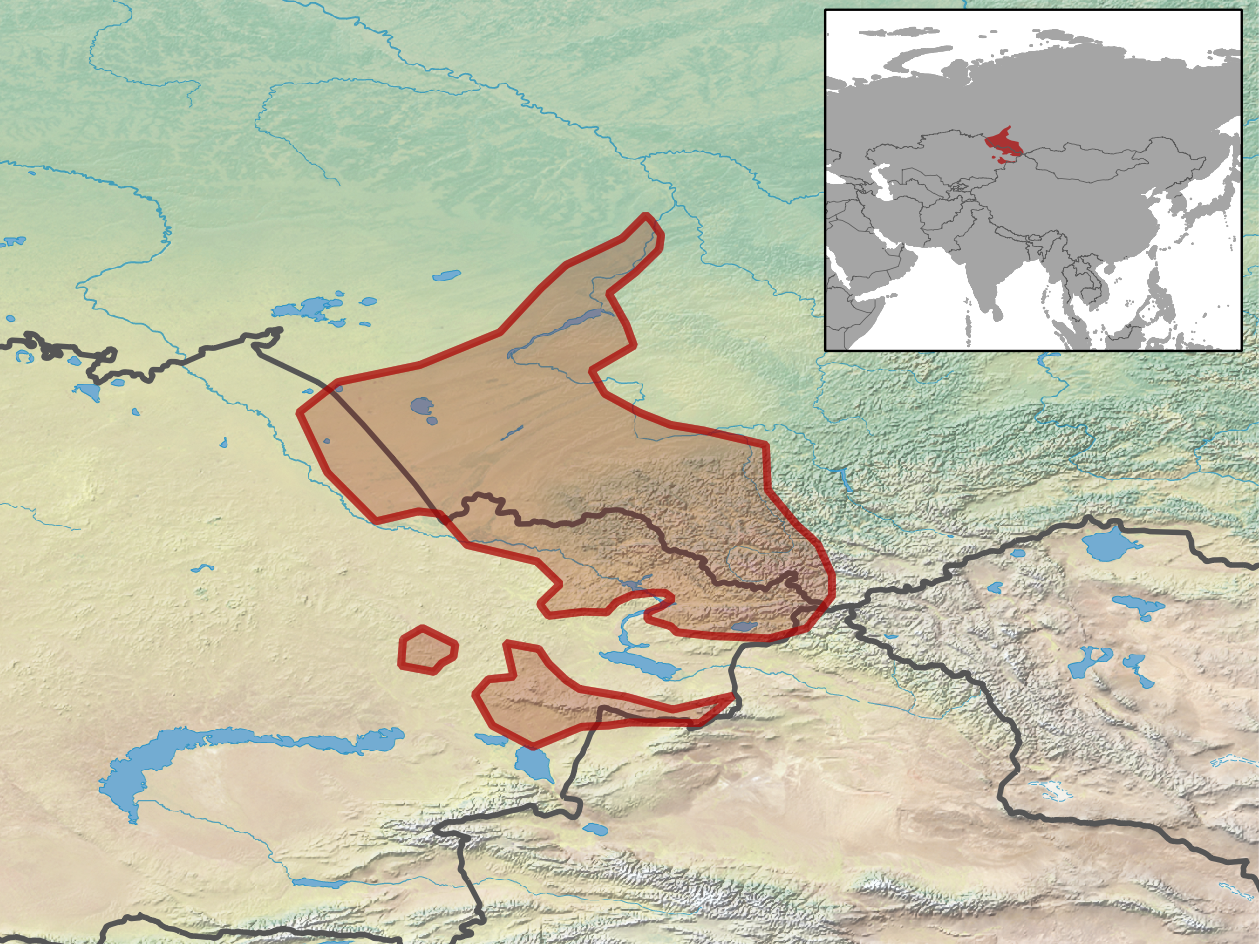

= Siberian zokor =

Species of rodent

The Siberian zokor (Myospalax myospalax) is a species of rodent in the family Spalacidae. It is found in Kazakhstan and Russia.
