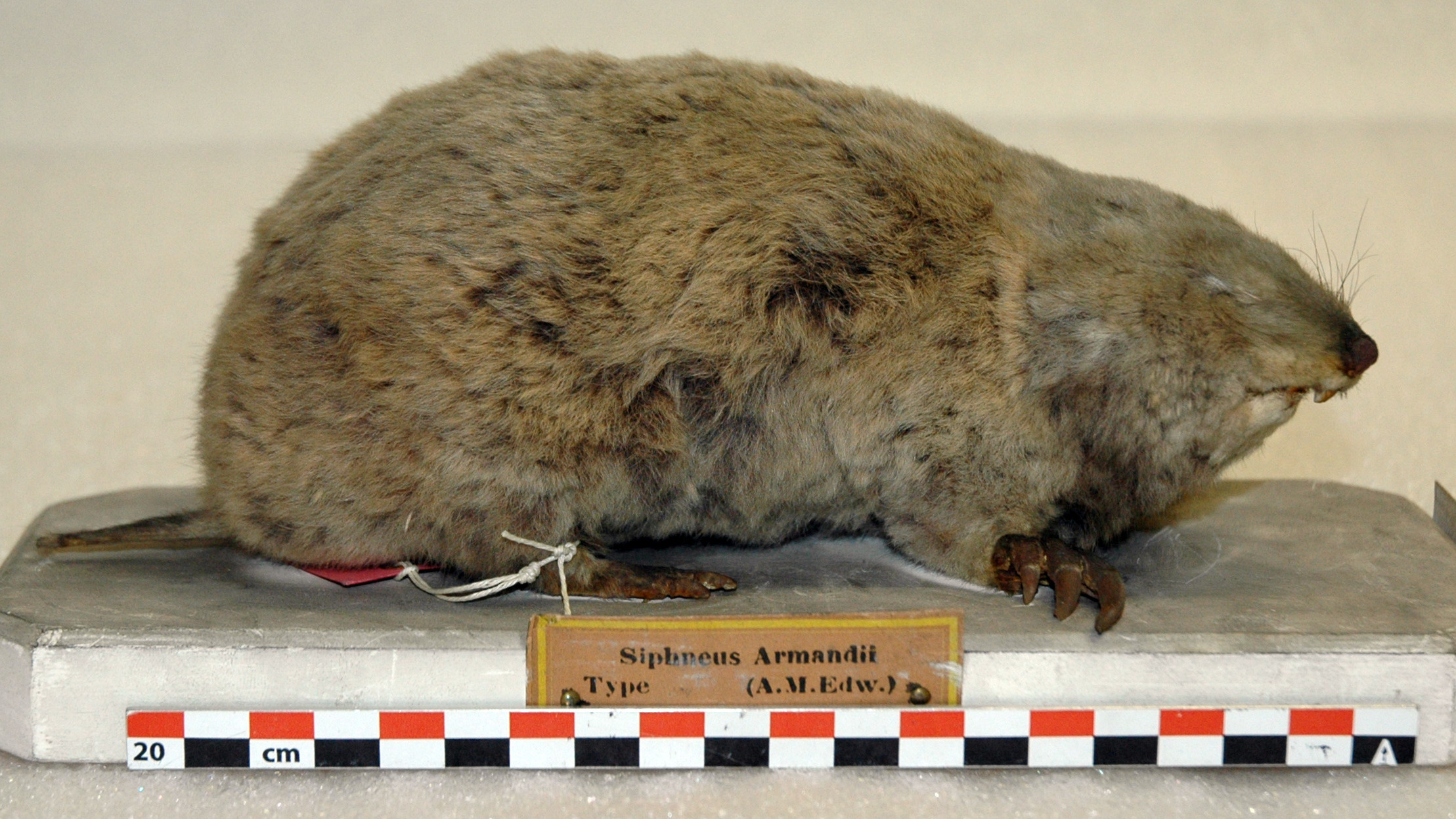

Conservation status
- Least Concern (IUCN 3.1)

Scientific classification
- Kingdom: Animalia
- Phylum: Chordata
- Class: Mammalia
- Order: Rodentia
- Family: Spalacidae
- Genus: Myospalax
- Species: M. aspalax

Binomial name
- Myospalax aspalax (Pallas, 1776)

= False zokor =

Species of rodent

The false zokor (Myospalax aspalax) is a species of rodent in the family Spalacidae. It is found in eastern Khentei and eastern Khingan in Mongolia and in the Onon River basin in Russia.
