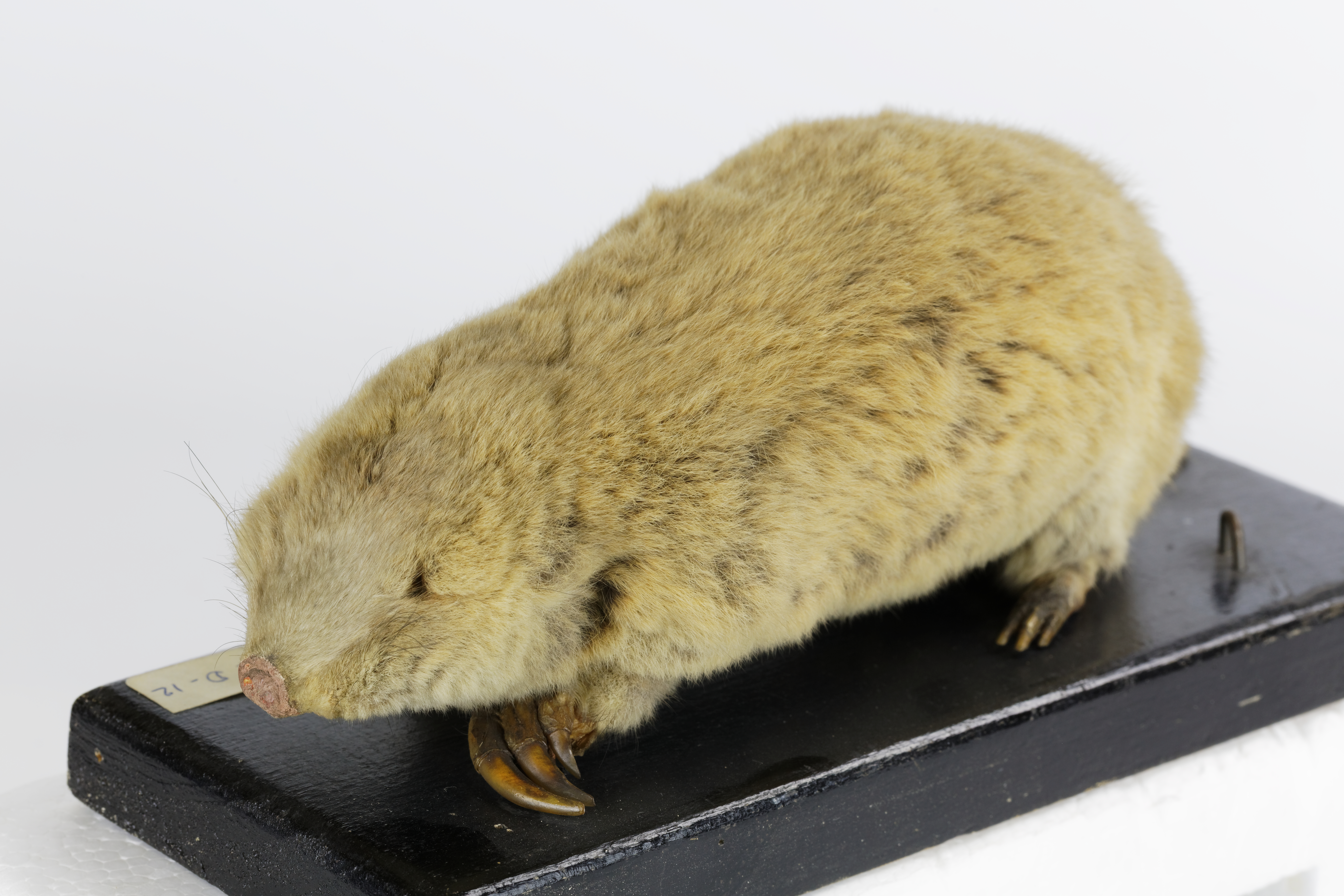

Scientific classification
- Kingdom: Animalia
- Phylum: Chordata
- Class: Mammalia
- Order: Rodentia
- Family: Spalacidae
- Subfamily: Myospalacinae
- Genus: Myospalax; Laxmann, 1769

Type species
- Mus myospalax

= Myospalax =

Genus of rodents

Myospalax is a genus of rodents in the family Spalacidae. It contains these species of zokor:

- False zokor, M. aspalax
- Siberian zokor, M. myospalax
- Transbaikal zokor, M. psilurus
