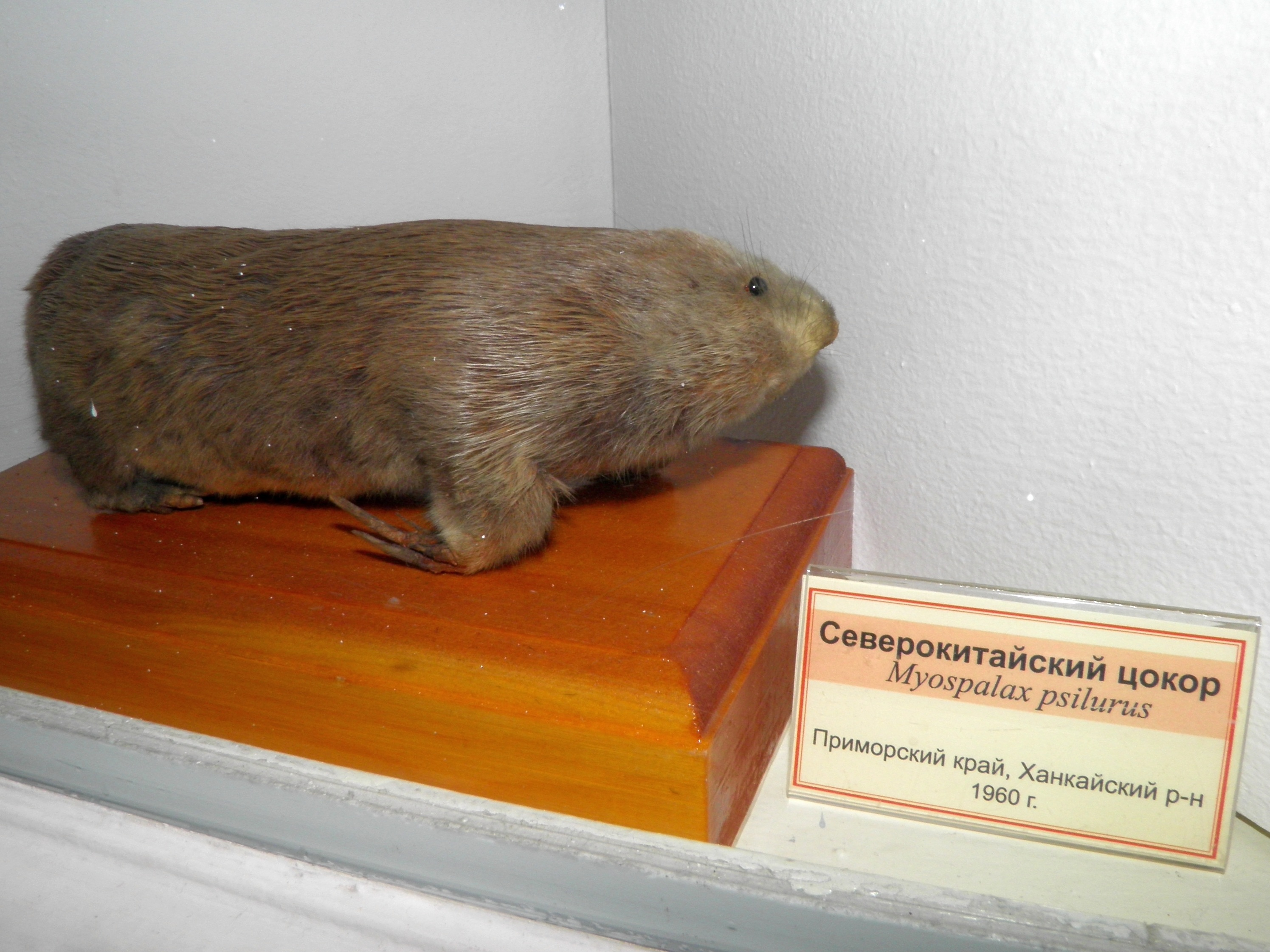

Conservation status
- Least Concern (IUCN 3.1)

Scientific classification
- Kingdom: Animalia
- Phylum: Chordata
- Class: Mammalia
- Order: Rodentia
- Family: Spalacidae
- Genus: Myospalax
- Species: M. psilurus

Binomial name
- Myospalax psilurus (Milne-Edwards, 1874)

Synonyms
- Myospalax epsilanus Thomas, 1912

= Transbaikal zokor =

Species of rodent

The Transbaikal zokor (Myospalax psilurus) is a species of rodent in the family Spalacidae. It is found in China, Mongolia, and Russia.
