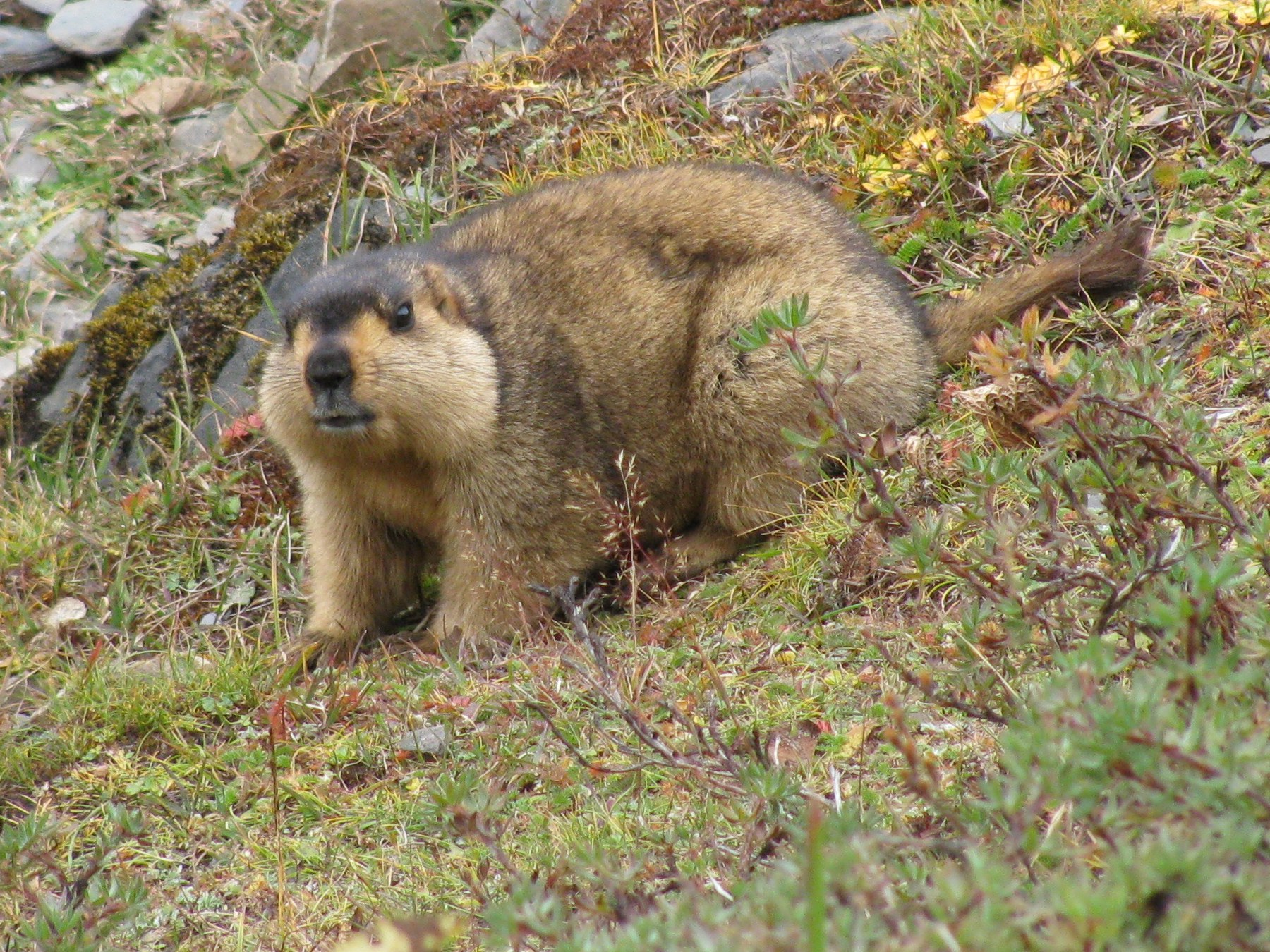

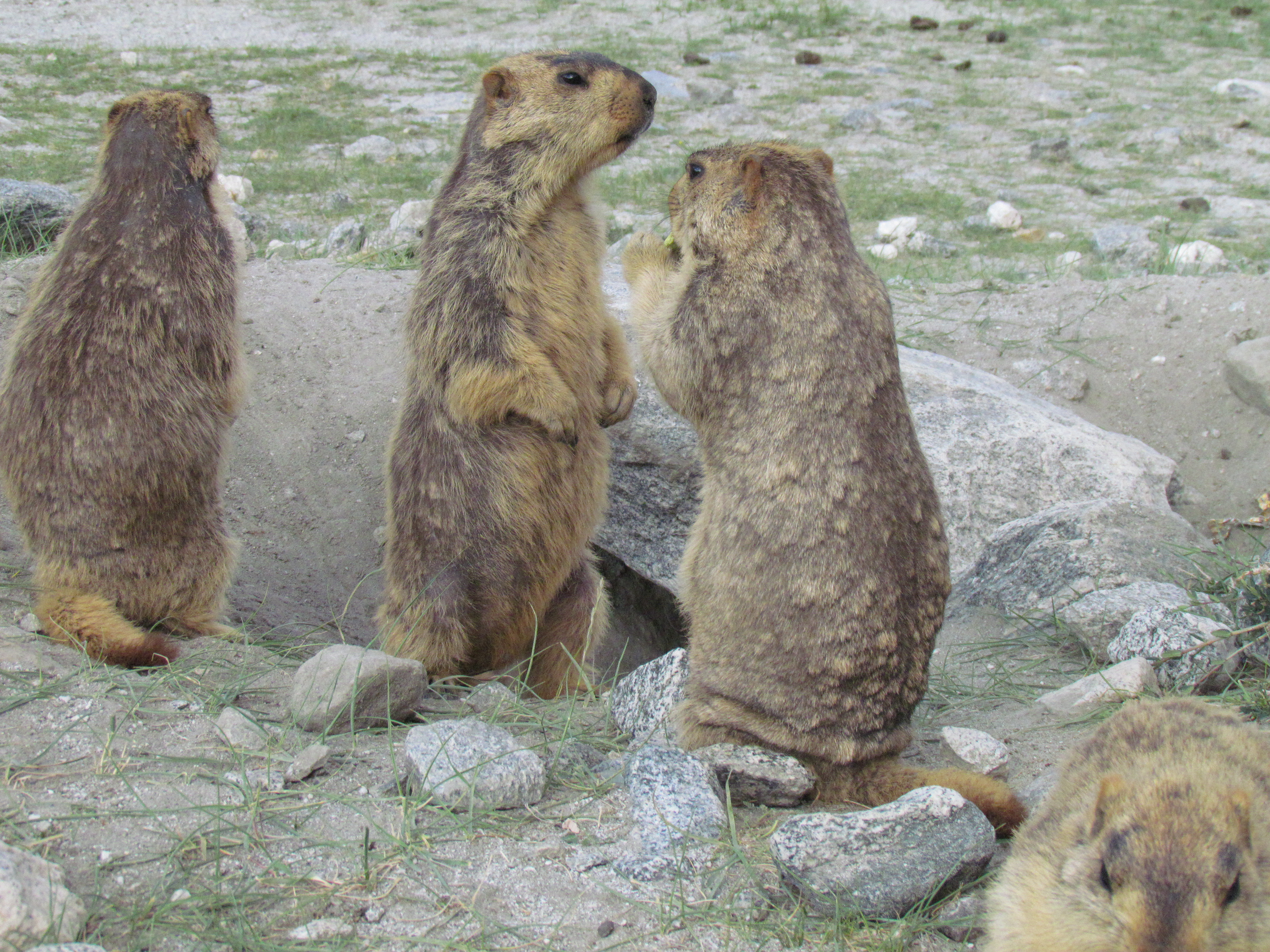
- Individual at Tshophu Lake, Bhutan (above), group with worn pelage in Ladakh, India (below)

Conservation status
- Least Concern (IUCN 3.1)

Scientific classification
- Kingdom: Animalia
- Phylum: Chordata
- Class: Mammalia
- Order: Rodentia
- Family: Sciuridae
- Genus: Marmota
- Species: M. himalayana

Binomial name
- Marmota himalayana (Hodgson, 1841)

= Himalayan marmot =

Species of rodent

The Himalayan marmot (Marmota himalayana) is a marmot species that inhabits alpine grasslands throughout the Himalayas and on the Tibetan Plateau. It is IUCN Red Listed as Least Concern because of its wide range and possibly large population.

== Taxonomy ==
Arctomys himalayanus was the scientific name proposed by Brian Houghton Hodgson in 1841 who described marmot skins from the Himalayas. In the 19th century, several Himalayan marmot specimens were described and proposed as subspecies. Two genetically distinct subspecies are recognized today:

- M. h. himalayana
- M. h. robusta (Milne-Edwards, 1871) – Szechwan marmot

The Himalayan marmot is very closely related to the Tarbagan marmot (M. sibirica) and somewhat more distantly to the black-capped marmot (M. camtschatica). These three form a species group, with their next nearest relatives being the bobak species group, which includes the bobak marmot (M. bobak) itself, as well as the grey marmot (M. baibacina) and forest-steppe marmot (M. kastschenkoi). In the past, the relatively short-furred and short-tailed marmots of the Palearctic region, i.e. Himalayan, Tarbagan, grey and forest-steppe, were all regarded as subspecies of the bobak marmot.

== Characteristics ==
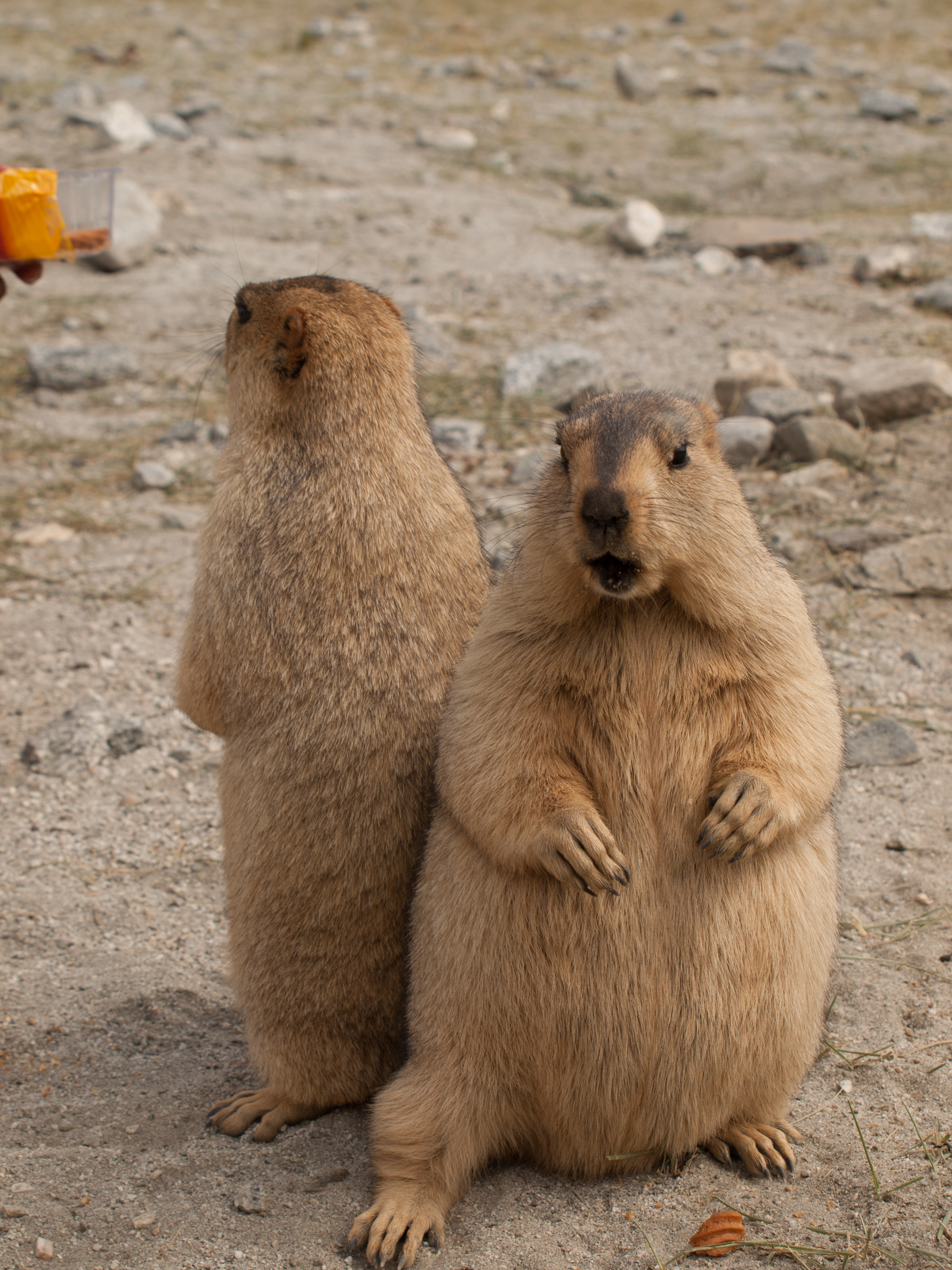
Himalayan marmots near Pangong Tso, Ladakh

The Himalayan marmot has a dense woolly fur that is rufous grey on the back and rufous yellowish on ears, belly and limbs. The bridge of its nose and end of tail is dark brown. It is one of the largest marmots in the world, being about the size of a large housecat; their average body weight ranges from 4 to 9.2 kg (8.8 to 20.3 lb), with weights lowest post-hibernation in spring and highest prior to it in autumn. In the autumn, average weight is reportedly more than 7 kg (15 lb) in both sexes. The total length is about 45 to 67 cm (18 to 26 in), with a tail length of 12 to 15 cm (4.7 to 5.9 in).

== Distribution and habitat ==
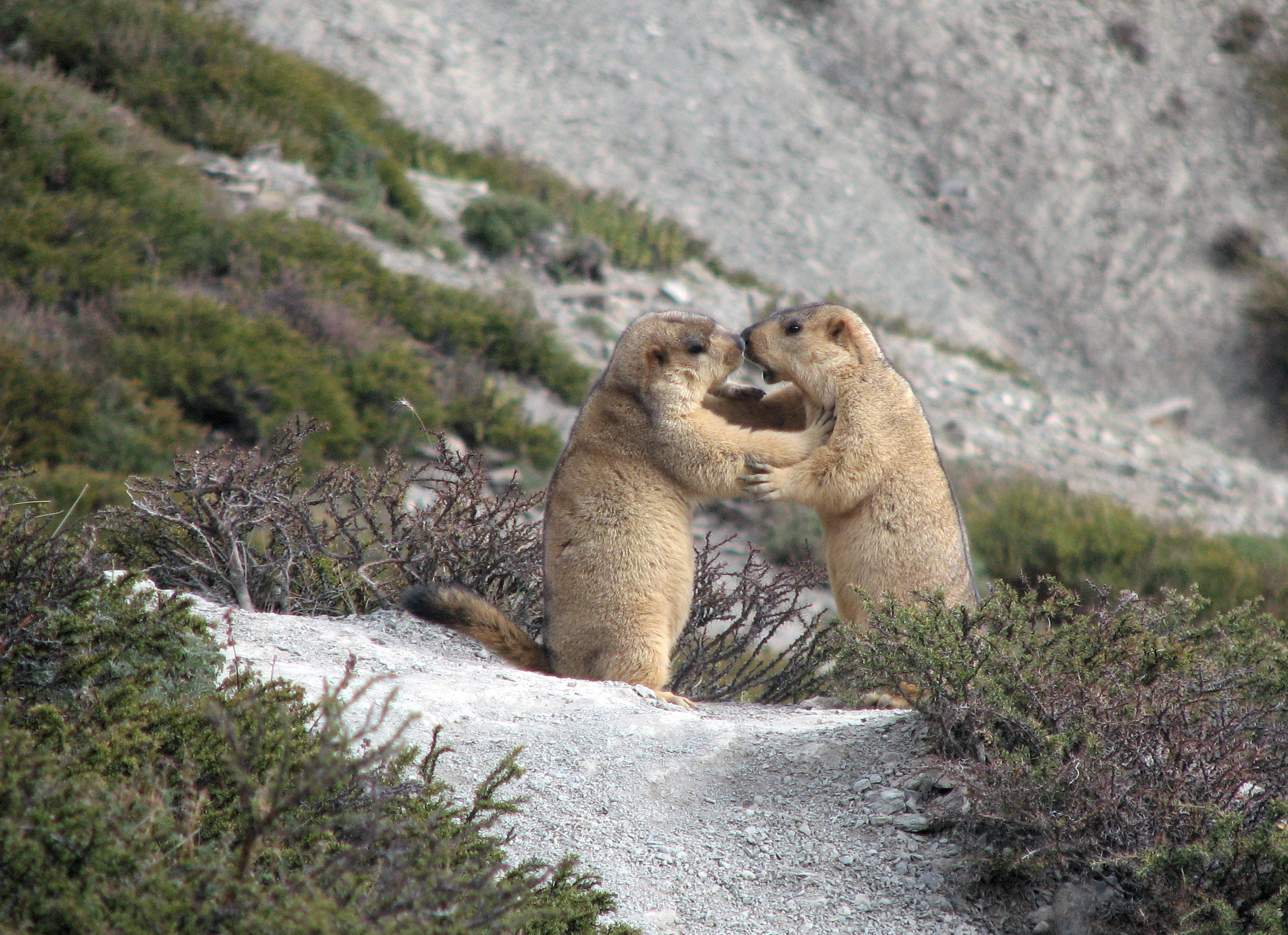
Himalayan marmots near Ganda La, Ladakh

The Himalayan marmot occurs in the Himalayas and Tibetan Plateau at altitudes of 3,000–5,500 m (9,800–18,000 ft) in northeastern Pakistan, northern India, Nepal, Bhutan and China. In India, it can be seen in high-altitude regions of Ladakh and Kashmir. In China, it has been recorded in Xinjiang, Qinghai, Gansu, Tibet, western Sichuan and Yunnan provinces. In the west its distribution reaches that of the long-tailed marmot (M. caudata), but the two are not known to hybridise. The Himalayan marmot lives in short grass steppes or alpine habitats, typically above the tree line but below the permanent snow limit.

== Ecology and behaviour ==
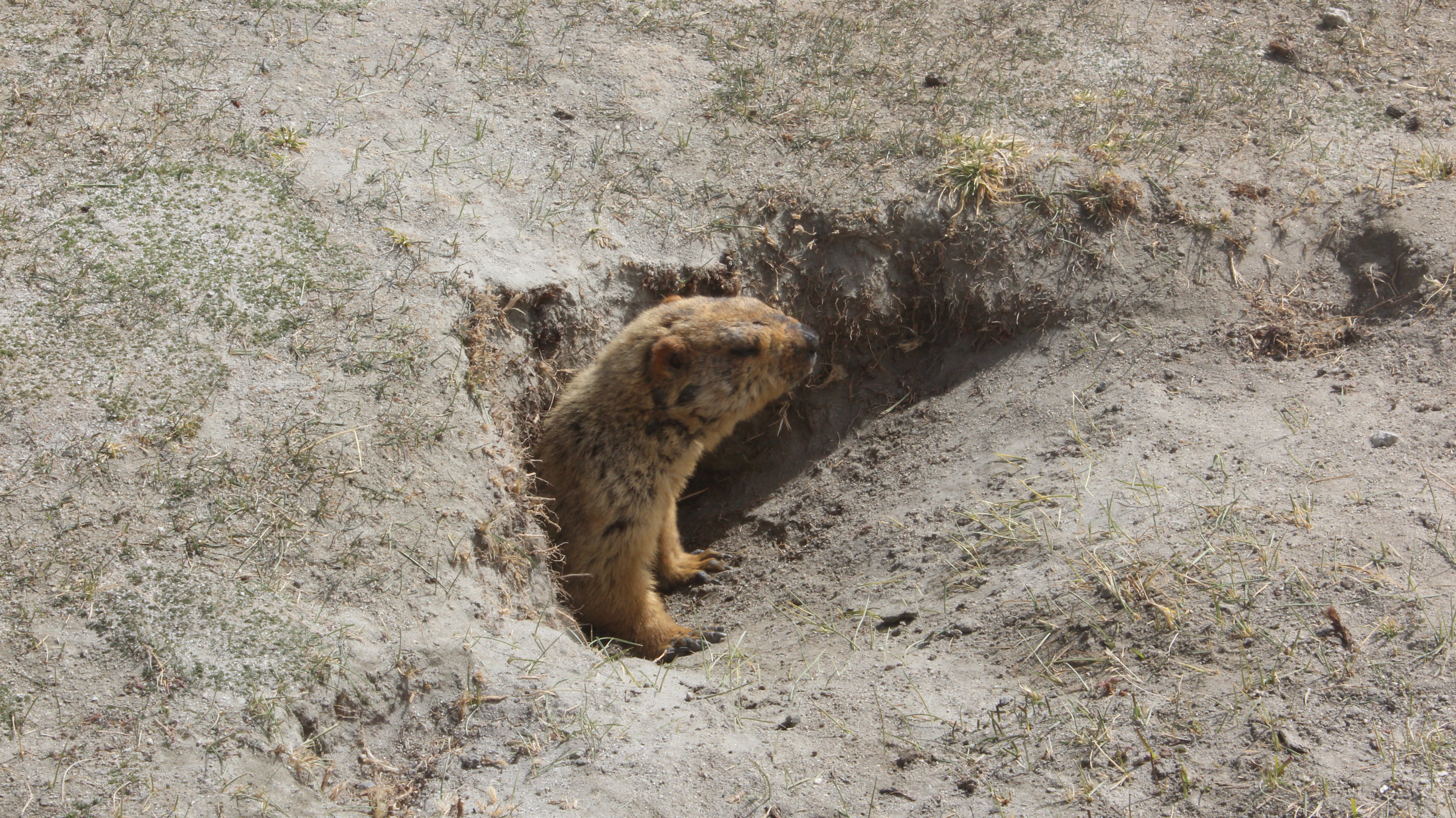
Himalayan marmot peeping out of its burrow

The Himalayan marmot lives in colonies and excavates deep burrows that colony members share during hibernation. The species hibernates from the late autumn to the early spring, on average for 7½ months. The burrows are between 2 and 10 m (6 ft 7 in – 32 ft 10 in) deep, provided that the upper soil layer is sufficiently light and deep such as fluvioglacial, deluvial and alluvial deposits. Where soil conditions are ideal on alluvial terraces, marmot colonies comprise up to 30 families, with up to 10 families living in an area of 1 km^{2} (0.39 sq mi). The marmot eats plants growing on pastures, in particular the soft and juicy parts of grassy plant species like Carex, Agrostis, Deschampsia, Koeleria and flowering species like Euphrasia, Gentiana, Halenia, Polygonum, Primula, Ranunculus, Saussurea, Taraxacum, and Iris potaninii.

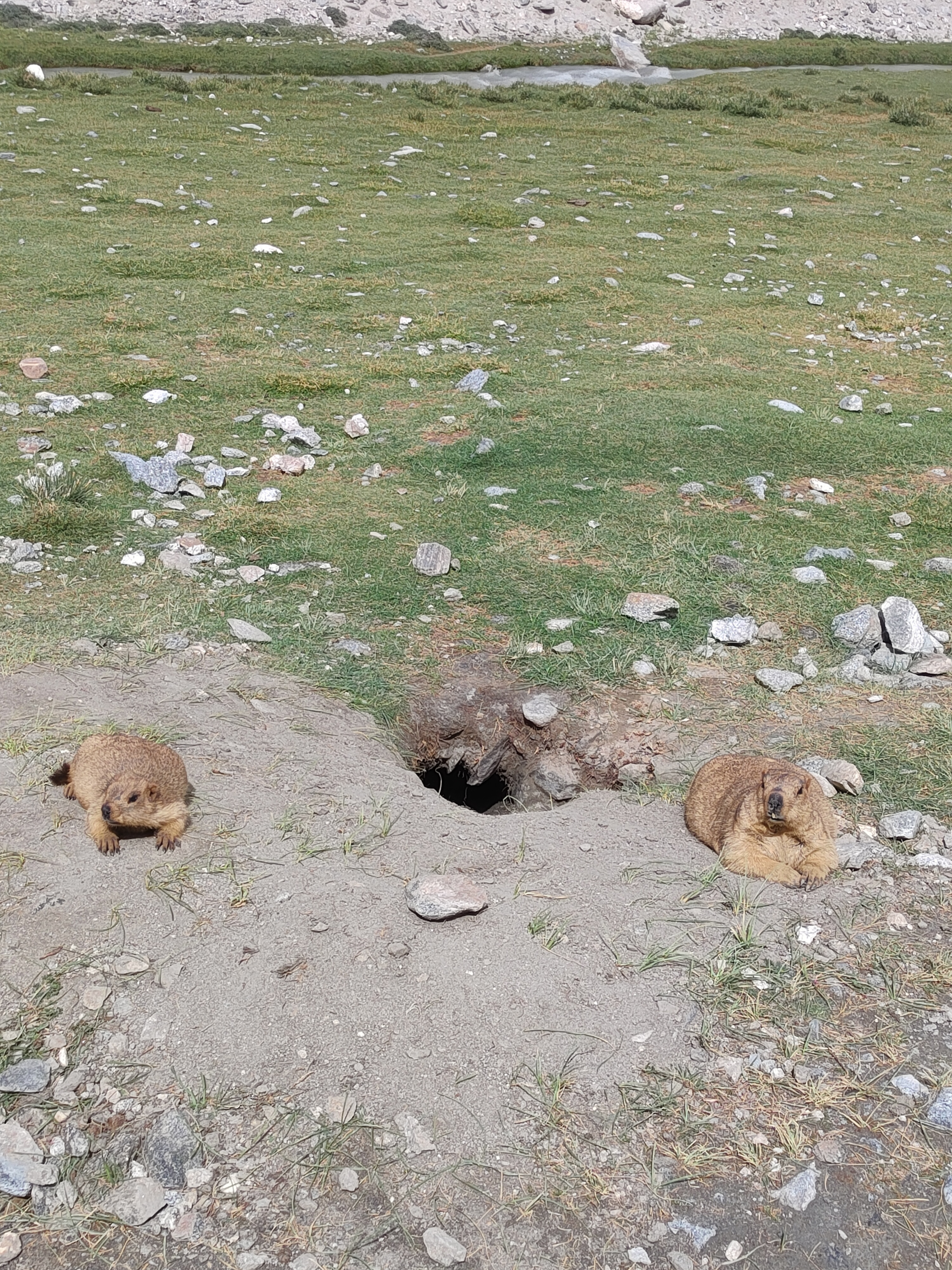
Himalayan marmots enroute to Pangong Tso waiting to be fed by tourists

In Ladakh, Himalayan marmots interact with humans who feed them. This have led to greater lesser survival instinct behaviour among the marmots resulting in them being easily preyed upon by stray dogs, or other natural predators.

=== Reproduction ===
Females become sexually mature at the age of two years. After one month of gestation they give birth to litters of two to 11 young.

=== Predators ===
On the Tibetan Plateau, marmot species form part of snow leopard prey. Other predators of Himalayan marmots include Tibetan wolves, red fox, and large birds of prey like golden eagles.

== In culture ==
It was known to the ancient Greek writers as the gold-digging ant apparently as reference to the fact that gold nuggets were found in the silts of the burrows these marmots dug. The French ethnologist Michel Peissel claimed that the story of 'gold-digging ants' reported by the Greek historian Herodotus was founded on the golden Himalayan marmot of the Deosai plateau and the habit of local tribes such as the Minaro to collect the gold dust excavated from their burrows.

A photograph of a Himalayan marmot under attack by a Tibetan fox taken by Bao Yongqing won the overall prize in the 2019 Wildlife Photographer of the Year award.

== See also ==
- Long-tailed marmot
