= List of mammals of Kyrgyzstan =

This list of mammals of Kyrgyzstan comprises 43 mammal species recorded in Kyrgyzstan, of which four are endangered, five are vulnerable, and three are near threatened.

The following tags are used to highlight each species' conservation status as assessed by the International Union for Conservation of Nature:

EX	Extinct	No reasonable doubt that the last individual has died.
EW	Extinct in the wild	Known only to survive in captivity or as a naturalized populations well outside its previous range.
CR	Critically endangered	The species is in imminent risk of extinction in the wild.
EN	Endangered	The species is facing an extremely high risk of extinction in the wild.
VU	Vulnerable	The species is facing a high risk of extinction in the wild.
NT	Near threatened	The species does not meet any of the criteria that would categorise it as risking extinction but it is likely to do so in the future.
LC	Least concern	There are no current identifiable risks to the species.
DD	Data deficient	There is inadequate information to make an assessment of the risks to this species.

== Order: Rodentia (rodents) ==
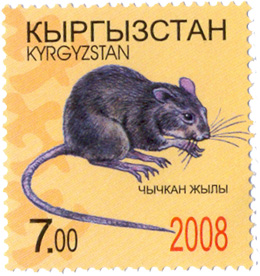
The "Year of the Rat" stamp from Kyrgyzstan

Rodents make up the largest order of mammals, with over 40% of mammalian species. They have two incisors in the upper and lower jaw which grow continually and must be kept short by gnawing. Most rodents are small though the capybara can weigh up to 45 kg (99 lb).

- Suborder: Hystricognathi
  - Family: Hystricidae (Old World porcupines)
    - Genus: Hystrix
      - Indian crested porcupine, H. indica LC presence uncertain
- Suborder: Sciurognathi
  - Family: Sciuridae (squirrels)
    - Subfamily: Xerinae
      - Tribe: Marmotini
        - Genus: Marmota
          - Gray marmot, M. baibacina LC
          - Long-tailed marmot, M. caudata LC
          - Menzbier's marmot, M. menzbieri VU
        - Genus: Spermophilus
          - Tien Shan ground squirrel, S. relictus LC
  - Family: Dipodidae (jerboas)
    - Subfamily: Allactaginae
      - Genus: Allactaga
        - Vinogradov's jerboa, A. vinogradovi
  - Family: Gliridae (dormice)
    - Subfamily: Leithiinae
      - Genus: Dryomys
        - Forest dormouse, D. nitedula
  - Family: Cricetidae
    - Subfamily: Arvicolinae
      - Genus: Clethrionomys
        - Tien Shan red-backed vole, C. centralis
      - Genus: Ellobius
        - Alai mole vole, E. alaicus EN
      - Genus: Microtus
        - Tien Shan vole, M. kirgisorum
  - Family: Muridae (mice, rats, voles, gerbils, hamsters)
    - Subfamily: Gerbillinae
      - Genus: Meriones
        - Midday jird, M. meridianus
        - Tamarisk jird, M. tamariscinus
    - Subfamily: Murinae
      - Genus: Rattus
        - Brown rat, R. norvegicus LC introduced
        - Turkestan rat, R. turkestanicus

== Order: Lagomorpha (lagomorphs) ==
The lagomorphs comprise two families, Leporidae (hares and rabbits), and Ochotonidae (pikas). Though they can resemble rodents, and were classified as a superfamily in that order until the early 20th century, they have since been considered a separate order. They differ from rodents in a number of physical characteristics, such as having four incisors in the upper jaw rather than two.

- Family: Leporidae (hares)
  - Genus: Lepus
    - Desert hare, L. tibetanus LC
    - Tolai hare, L. tolai LC
- Family: Ochotonidae (pikas)
  - Genus: Ochotona
    - Large-eared pika, O. macrotis LC
    - Turkestan red pika, O. rutila LC

== Order: Erinaceomorpha (hedgehogs and gymnures) ==
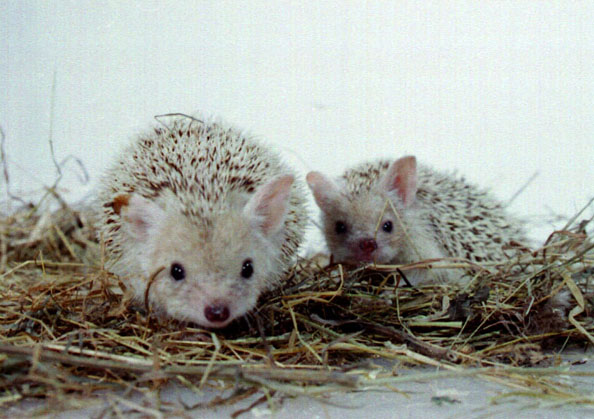
Long-eared hedgehog

The order Erinaceomorpha contains a single family, Erinaceidae, which comprise the hedgehogs and gymnures. The hedgehogs are easily recognised by their spines while gymnures look more like large rats.

- Family: Erinaceidae (hedgehogs)
  - Subfamily: Erinaceinae
    - Genus: Hemiechinus
      - Long-eared hedgehog, H. auritus LC

== Order: Soricomorpha (shrews, moles, and solenodons) ==
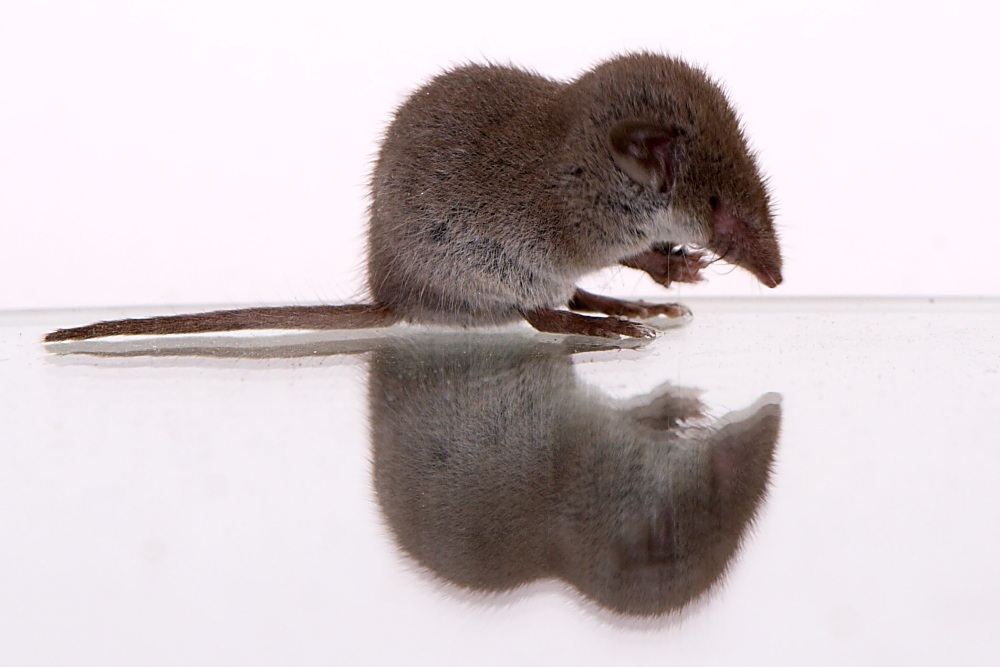
Lesser white-toothed shrew

The "shrew-forms" are insectivorous mammals. The shrews and solenodons closely resemble mice while the moles are stout-bodied burrowers.

- Family: Soricidae (shrews)
  - Subfamily: Crocidurinae
    - Genus: Crocidura
      - Lesser white-toothed shrew, C. suaveolens LC
  - Subfamily: Soricinae
    - Tribe: Nectogalini
      - Genus: Neomys
        - Eurasian water shrew, N. fodiens
    - Tribe: Soricini
      - Genus: Sorex
        - Eurasian pygmy shrew, S. minutus

== Order: Chiroptera (bats) ==
The bats' most distinguishing feature is that their forelimbs are developed as wings, making them the only mammals capable of flight. Bat species account for about 20% of all mammals.

- Family: Vespertilionidae
  - Subfamily: Myotinae
    - Genus: Myotis
      - Lesser mouse-eared bat, M. blythii LC
      - Geoffroy's bat, M. emarginatus LC
    - Genus: Nyctalus
      - Common noctule, N. noctula LC
  - Subfamily: Vespertilioninae
    - Genus: Eptesicus
      - Botta's serotine, E. bottae LC
- Family: Rhinolophidae
  - Subfamily: Rhinolophinae
    - Genus: Rhinolophus
      - Greater horseshoe bat, R. ferrumequinum LC
      - Lesser horseshoe bat, R. hipposideros LC

== Order: Carnivora (carnivorans) ==
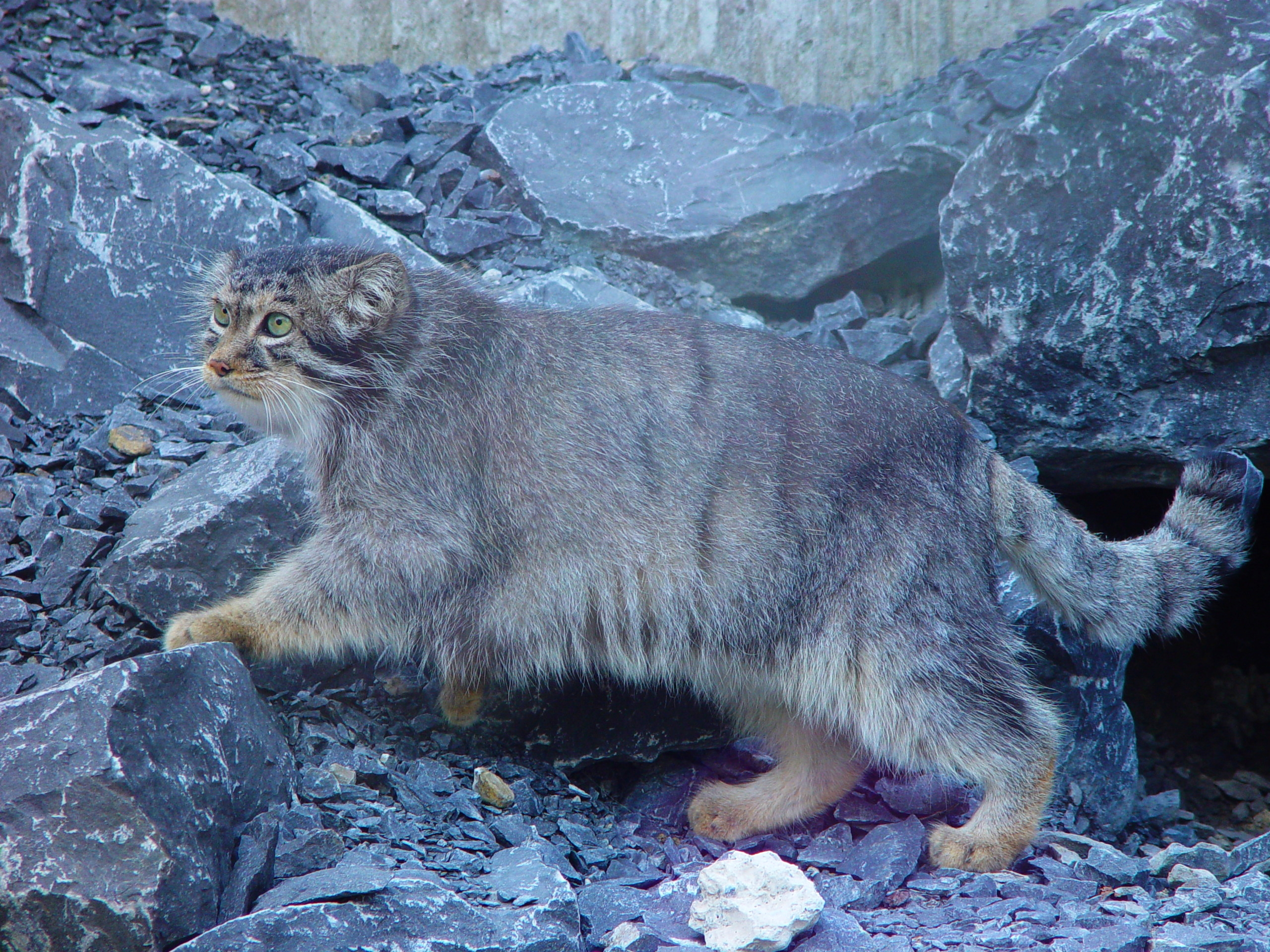
Pallas's cat

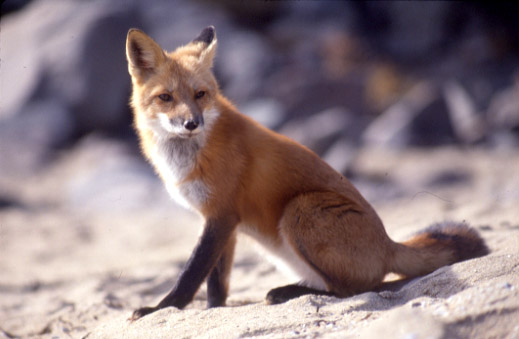
Red fox

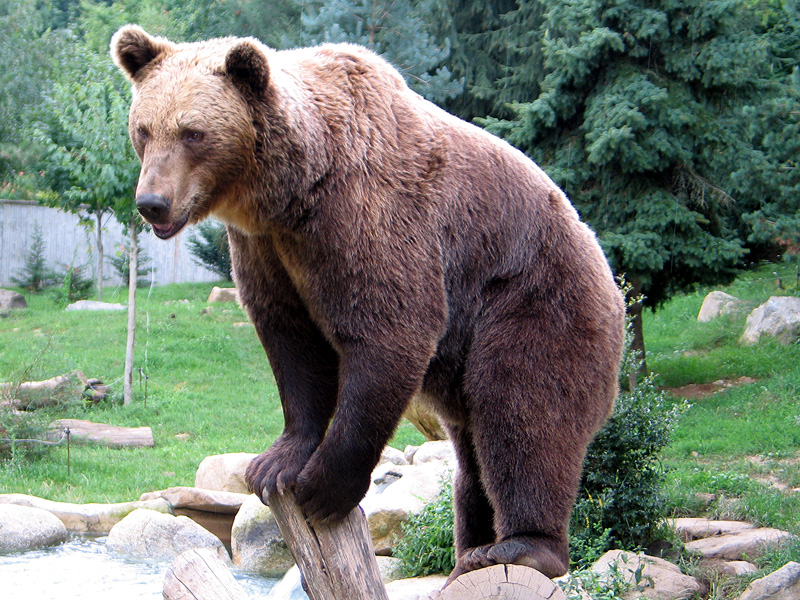
Brown bear

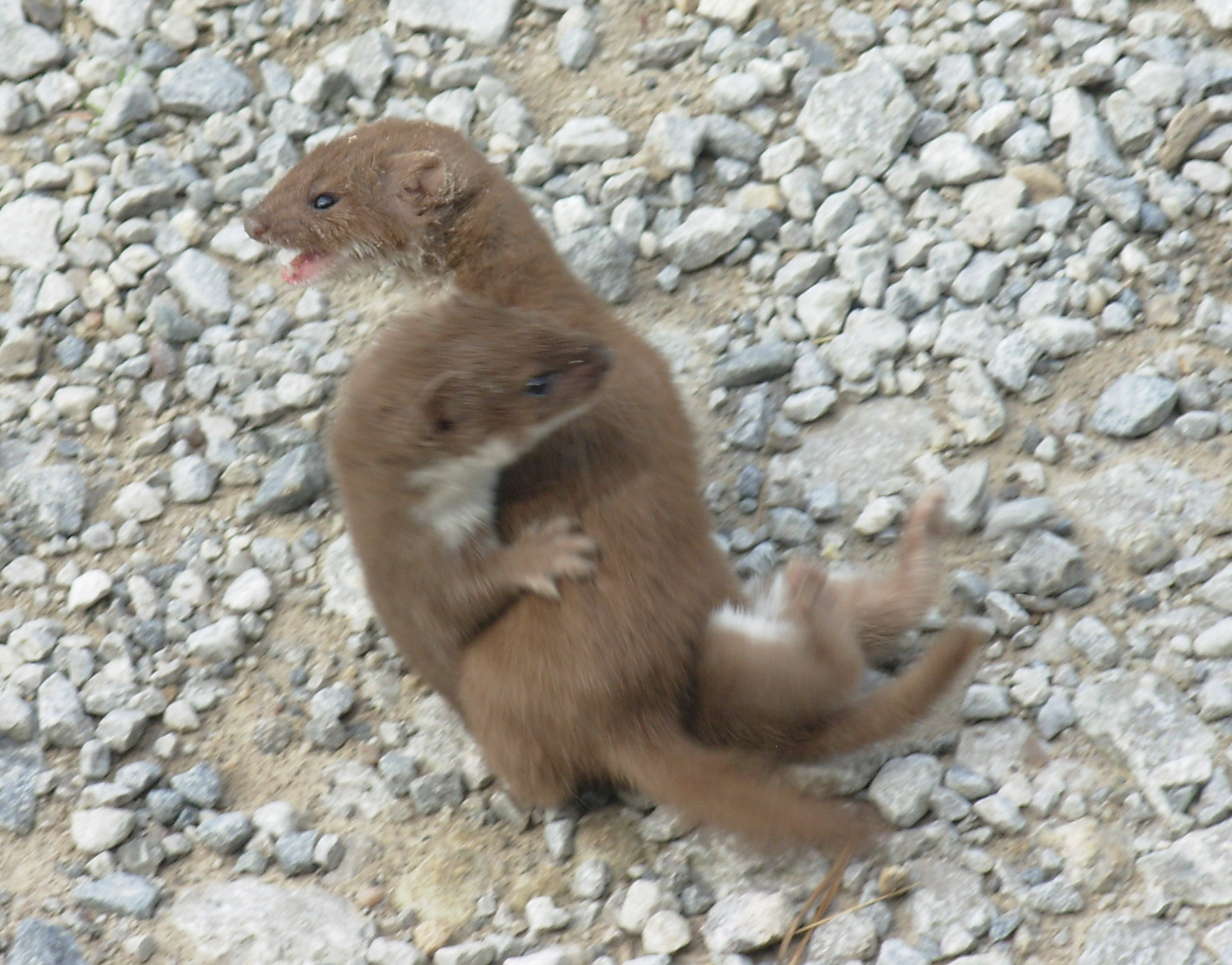
Least weasel

There are over 260 species of carnivorans, the majority of which feed primarily on meat. They have a characteristic skull shape and dentition.

- Suborder: Feliformia
  - Family: Felidae
    - Subfamily: Felinae
      - Genus: Felis
        - Jungle cat, F. chaus LC, presence uncertain
        - African wildcat, F. lybica LC
          - Asiatic wildcat, F. l. ornata
      - Genus: Lynx
        - Eurasian lynx, L. lynx LC
      - Genus: Otocolobus
        - Pallas's cat, O. manul LC
    - Subfamily: Pantherinae
      - Genus: Panthera
        - Snow leopard, P. uncia VU
- Suborder: Caniformia
  - Family: Canidae
    - Genus: Canis
      - Gray wolf, C. lupus LC
        - Steppe wolf, C. l. campestris
    - Genus: Vulpes
      - Corsac fox, V. corsac LC
      - Red fox, V. vulpes LC
    - Genus: Cuon
      - Dhole, C. alpinus EN
  - Family: Ursidae (bears)
    - Genus: Ursus
      - Brown bear, U. arctos LC
  - Family: Mustelidae (mustelids)
    - Genus: Lutra
      - Eurasian otter, L. lutra EX in Kyrgyzstan
    - Genus: Martes
      - Beech marten, M. foina LC
    - Genus: Meles
      - Asian badger, M. leucurus LC
      - Caucasian badger, M. canescens NE
    - Genus: Mustela
      - Mountain weasel, M. altaica NT
      - Stoat, M. erminea LC
      - Steppe polecat, M. eversmannii LC
      - Least weasel, M. nivalis LC

== Order: Artiodactyla (even-toed ungulates) ==
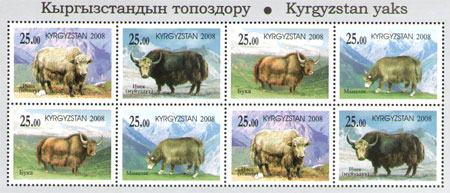
"The Yaks of Kyrgyzstan", a block of stamps

The even-toed ungulates are ungulates whose weight is borne about equally by the third and fourth toes, rather than mostly or entirely by the third as in perissodactyls. There are about 220 artiodactyl species, including many that are of great economic importance to humans.

- Family: Bovidae (cattle, antelope, sheep, goats)
  - Subfamily: Antilopinae
    - Genus: Gazella
      - Goitered gazelle, G. subgutturosa EW in Kyrgyzstan
  - Subfamily: Bovinae
    - Genus: Bison
      - European bison, B. bonasus Introduced in Kyrgyzstan, but EX in Kyrgyzstan
  - Subfamily: Caprinae
    - Genus: Capra
      - Siberian ibex, C. sibrica NT
    - Genus: Ovis
      - Argali, O. ammon NT
- Family: Cervidae (deer)
  - Subfamily: Cervinae
    - Genus: Cervus
      - Wapiti, C. canadensis LC
        - Tian Shan wapiti, C. c. songaricus
  - Subfamily: Odocoileinae
    - Genus: Capreolus
      - Siberian roe deer, C. pygargus LC
- Family: Suidae
  - Subfamily: Suinae
    - Genus: Sus
      - Wild boar, S. scrofa LC

== Locally extinct ==
The following species are locally extinct in Kyrgyzstan:

- Tiger, Panthera tigris
- Eurasian otter, Lutra lutra
- Onager, Equus hemionus
- Goitered gazelle, Gazella subgutturosa (extinct in the wild)

== See also ==
- List of chordate orders
- Lists of mammals by region
- Mammal classification
