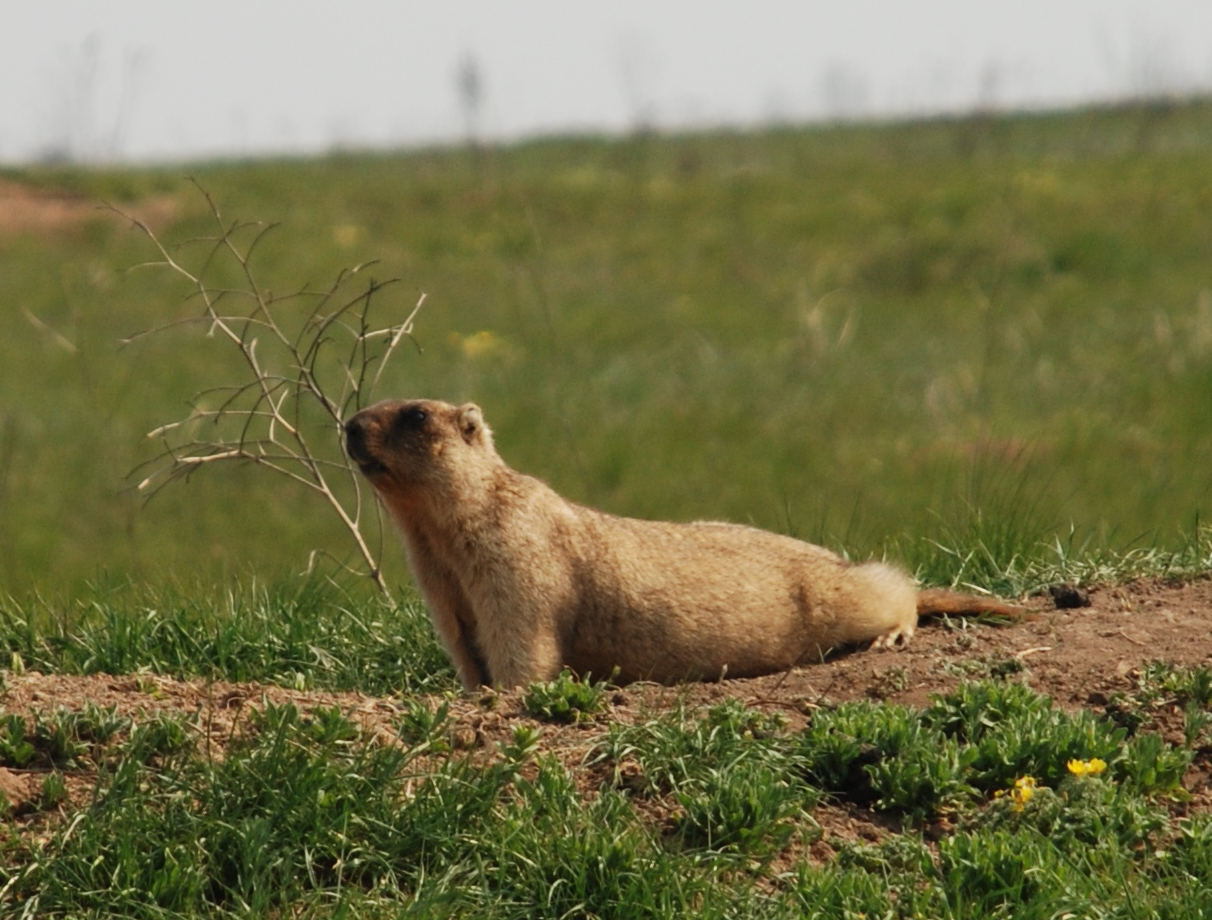

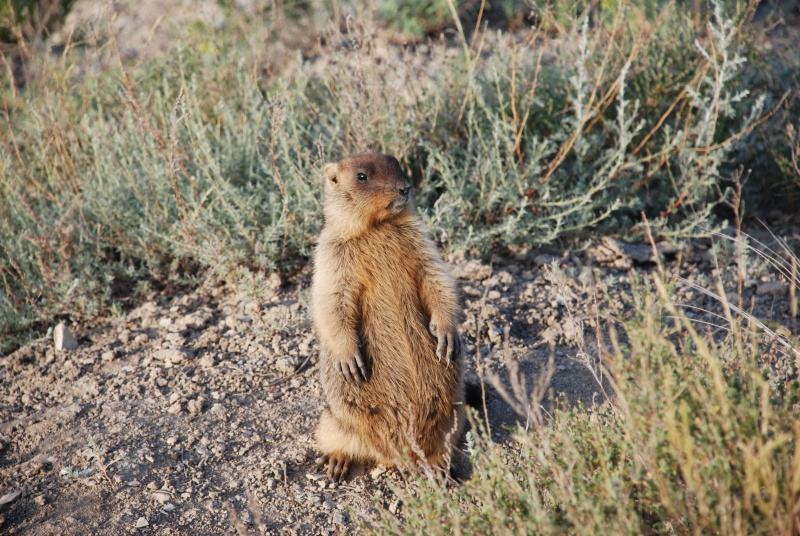
- above in Ukraine, below in Volgograd Oblast, Russia

Conservation status
- Least Concern (IUCN 3.1)

Scientific classification
- Kingdom: Animalia
- Phylum: Chordata
- Class: Mammalia
- Order: Rodentia
- Family: Sciuridae
- Genus: Marmota
- Species: M. bobak

Binomial name
- Marmota bobak (Müller, 1776)
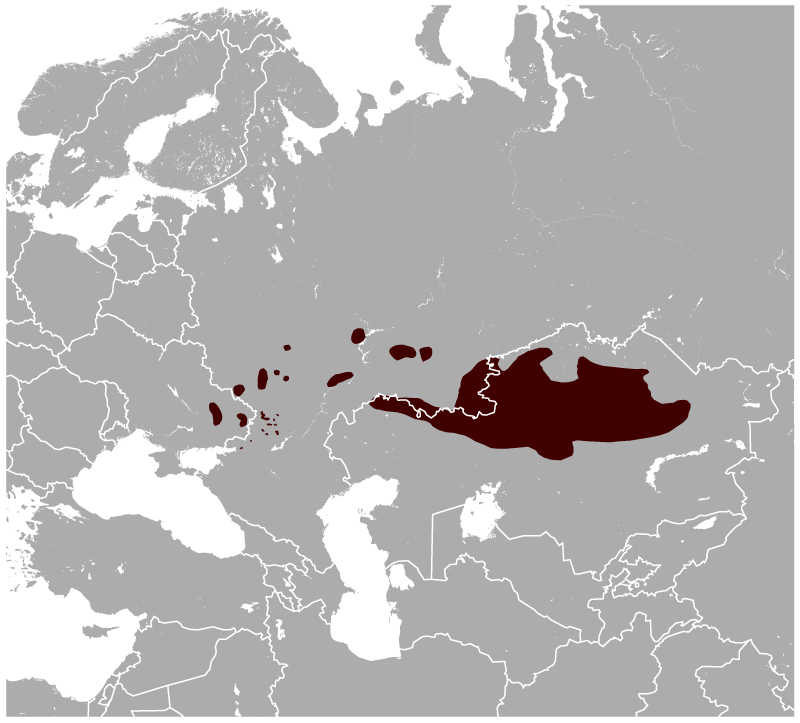
- Bobak marmot range

= Bobak marmot =

Species of rodent

The bobak marmot (Marmota bobak), also known as the steppe marmot, is a species of marmot that inhabits the steppes of Eastern Europe and Central Asia. It is a social animal and inhabits steppe grassland, including cultivated field borders. It hibernates for more than half the year. Litter sizes average about five offspring and it takes three years for the young marmots to reach sexual maturity. Male offspring leave the home colony after their second winter, and about 60% of mature females give birth in any one year.

== Taxonomy ==
There are two recognized subspecies:

- M. b. bobak – western part of range
- M. b. tschaganensis (alternatively shaganensis) – eastern part of range

Although western animals are larger and darker than eastern, their separation into subspecies is questionable, as the variation appears to be clinal.

In the past, the other relatively short-furred and short-tailed marmots of the Palearctic region, i.e. Himalayan, Tarbagan, gray and forest-steppe, were all regarded as subspecies of the bobak marmot. Today, however, they are consistently recognized as separate from the bobak marmot. Genetic studies have shown that the bobak marmot forms a species group with the gray and forest-steppe marmots, while the Himalayan and Tarbagan marmots are more distantly related.

== Distribution ==
The bobak marmot is native to the steppes of Eastern Europe and Central Asia, ranging from central and eastern Ukraine, through far southwestern Russia, to northern and central Kazakhstan. Historically, its range was continuous, but it has disappeared from several regions, including its past range in southeastern Belarus and eastern Hungary, making its overall range discontinuous. In some places it has been reintroduced and is slowly expanding its range again. In Kazakhstan's highlands the bobak marmot comes into contact with the gray marmot and animals tend to show intermediate features. Scientists Alyona Koshkina, Johannes Kamp, et al. used satellite imagery to map the location of 7,000 Bobak marmot burrows across Kazakhstan's steppes in 2019, which are home to approximately 6 million marmots.

== Ecology ==
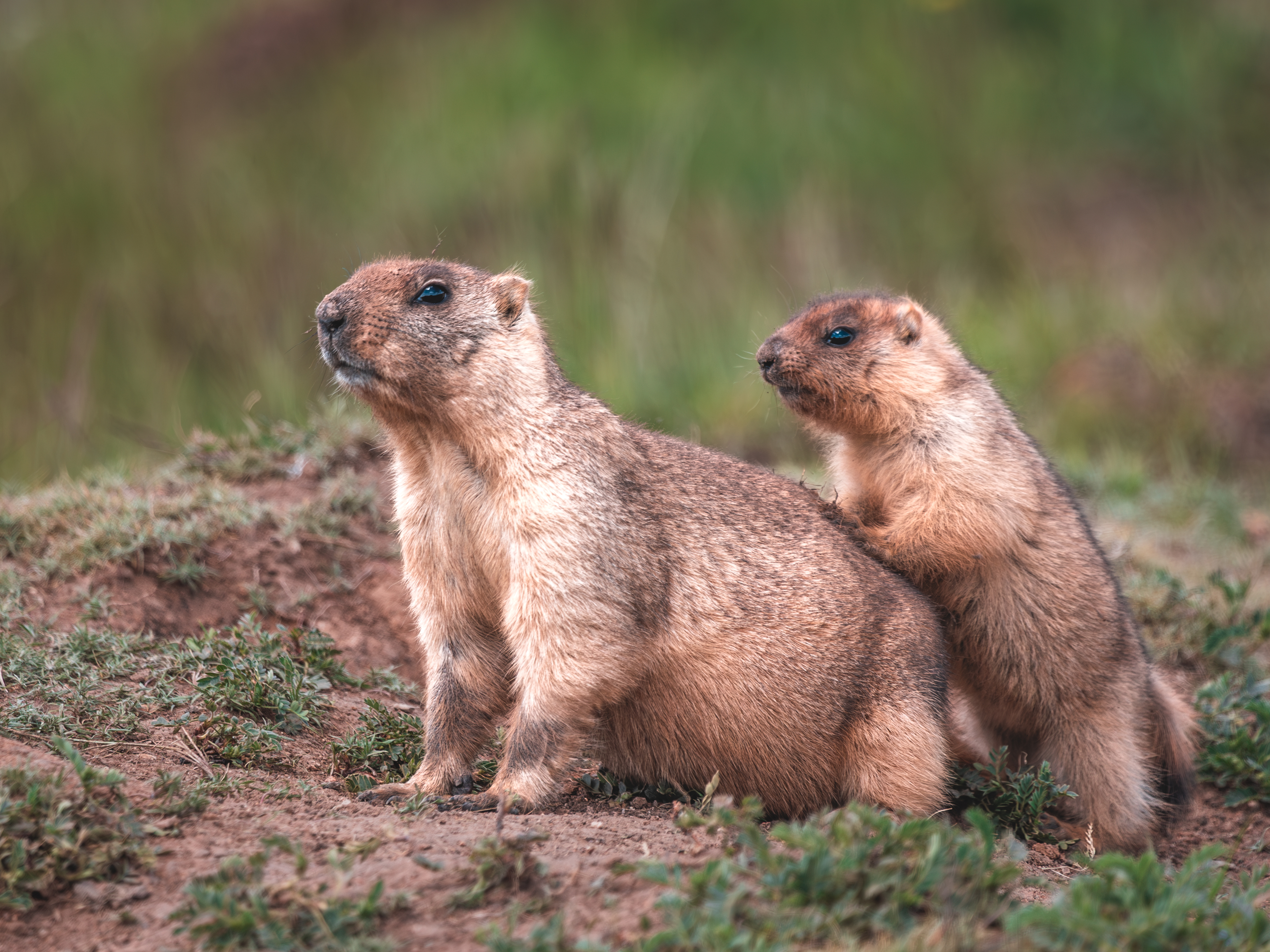
A pair of juvenile bobak marmots in the Burabay National Park in Kazakhstan

The bobak marmot is often described as a large analog of the North American prairie dog, with a round stomach, stubby legs, and a short tail. Bobak marmots inhabit steppe ecosystems and prosper on rolling grasslands and on the edge of cultivated fields. Active for about five and a half months each year, dispersers leave their natal social group after their second hibernation. Litter sizes average a little over five, and it takes at least three years to reach sexual maturity. About 60% of adult females breed in a given year. They have a single alarm call, but studies have demonstrated that bobak marmots call faster when they live in steep terrain and slower when they live in flatter terrain. Bobak marmots' fur is used to make hats and the occasional coat. Outside Moscow, a fur farm is experimenting with breeding bobak marmots in captivity for captive fur production.

Like other marmots, the bobak is susceptible to infection by bubonic plague. A population of bobaks living in the Ural Mountains is believed to have served as a reservoir host for the bubonic plague epidemic that struck western Russia at the end of the 19th century.

Marmots are preyed upon by snow leopards. They can also act as a buffer against other prey of the snow leopard.

== Cultural references ==
The bobak marmot is a symbol of Luhansk Oblast, Ukraine, as is found on its coat of arms and on the coats of arms of some of its districts.

The bobak is on the flag and coat of arms of Bizhbulyaksky District, Bashkortostan, Russia, and on the coat of arms of Kupiansk, Ukraine.

Luhansk Oblast coat of arms

Bizhbulyak District coat of arms

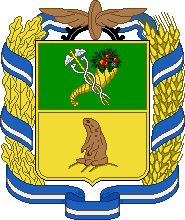
Kupiansk coat of arms

== See also ==
- Long-tailed marmot
