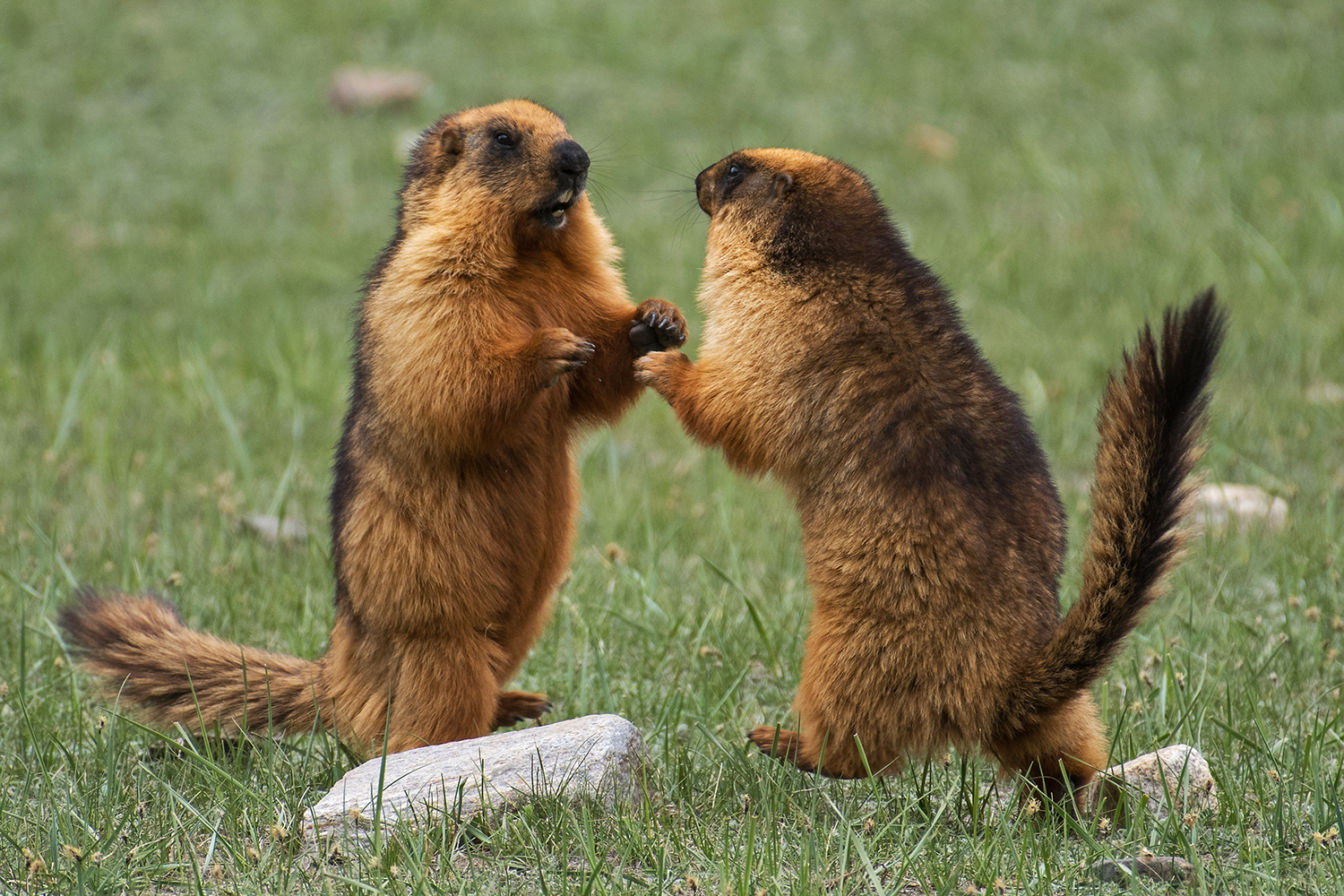
- Long-tailed marmots in Suru Valley, Ladakh, India

Conservation status
- Least Concern (IUCN 3.1)

Scientific classification
- Kingdom: Animalia
- Phylum: Chordata
- Class: Mammalia
- Order: Rodentia
- Family: Sciuridae
- Genus: Marmota
- Species: M. caudata

Binomial name
- Marmota caudata (I. Geoffroy, 1844)

= Long-tailed marmot =

Species of rodent

The long-tailed marmot (Marmota caudata) or golden marmot is a marmot species in the family Sciuridae. It occurs in mountainous regions in the central parts of Asia where it lives in open or lightly wooded habitats, often among rocks where dwarf junipers grow. It is IUCN Red Listed as Least Concern. As suggested by its name, it is a relatively long-tailed species of marmot.

== Description ==
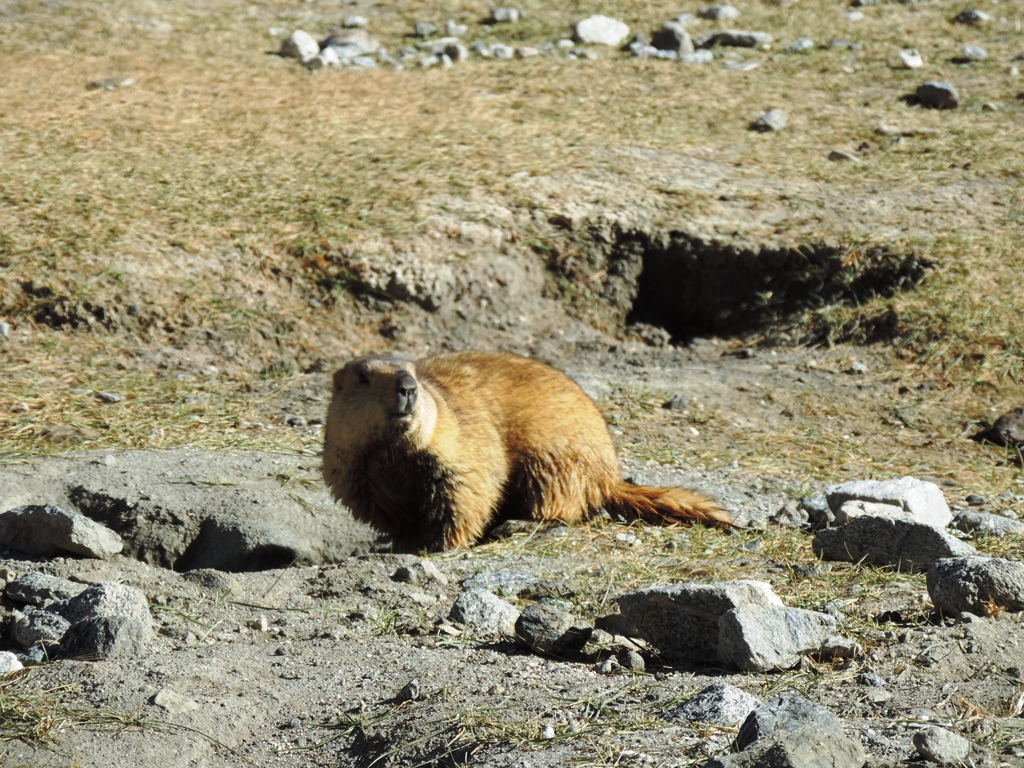
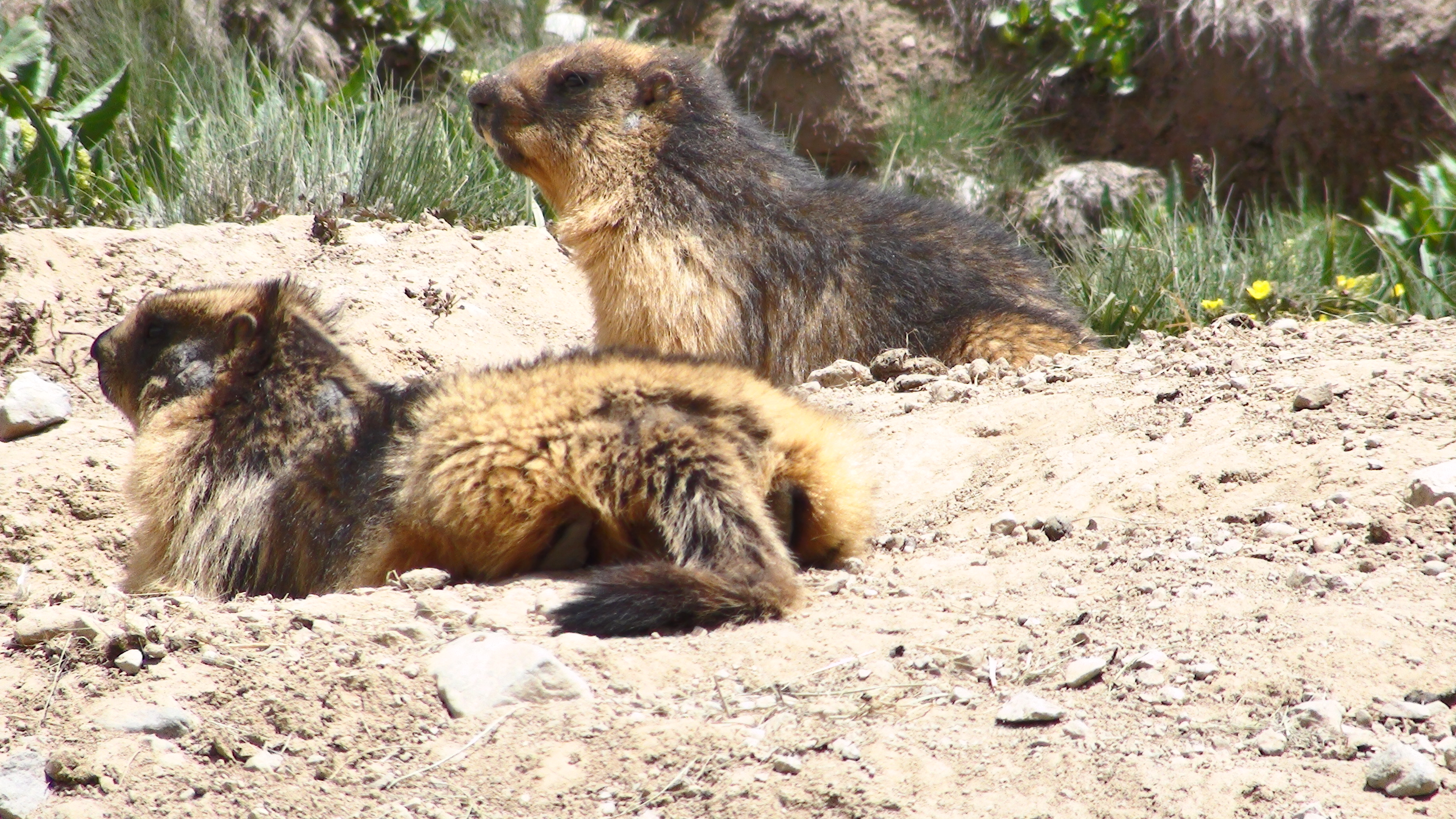
Two of its subspecies
- Above: M. c. aurea in Ladakh, India
- Below: M. c. caudata in Deosai National Park, Pakistan

The long-tailed marmot is a large, sturdy rodent weighing up to 9 kg (20 lb). Its typical weight range is from 1.5 to 7.3 kg (3.3–16.1 lb), with the lower weights in the spring directly after hibernation and the higher weights in the autumn just before hibernation where more than one–quarter of its mass can be fat. Males average slightly larger than females. Its head-and-body length is 37–80 cm (15–31 in) and the tail is about 16–28 cm (6.3–11.0 in) long. The tail is 37–55% of the head-and-body length. This is considerably longer than typical of other marmots, although the proportionally longest-tailed individuals of the grey (M. baibacina) and alpine marmots (M. marmota) are comparable to the shortest-tailed individuals of the long-tailed marmot. The eyes are close to the top of the rather-flattened head, the ears are small and the neck is short. The forelegs are longer than the hind legs.

Several subspecies have been described for the long-tailed marmot, but only three are generally recognised: M. c. caudata, M. c. aurea and M. c. dichrous. The last has occasionally been considered a separate species. They differ in colours and some measurements, with M. c. caudata averaging larger than the others. M. c. aurea, the subspecies found in most of its range, is relatively bright golden-buff or orange-tawny overall. Its face is brownish and the top of its head is typically brown to black, but in small parts of its range it is the same colour as its back. The tip of the tail often is blackish. M. c. caudata also has a brown face, and its flanks and underparts are yellowish, but the rear top of its head and mid-back are black, while the tail is black or mixed yellowish and black. M. c. dichrous is black-brown below, but this subspecies is dimorphic in the colour of its upper parts: they are blackish-brown to dull brown in dark animals, and light brown to cream in pale animals.

== Distribution and habitat ==
The long-tailed marmot is restricted to Afghanistan, Kyrgyzstan, Tajikistan, far southern Kazakhstan (where rare), Uzbekistan, northern Pakistan, northwestern India and western China. In China, it has only been recorded in the Tian Shan Mountains of Xinjiang. Other mountain ranges where it occurs are the Pamir, Alay, Hindukush, Kunlun-Shan, Karakoram and northwestern Himalayas. Although its distribution comes into contact with those of the Menzbier's (M. menzbieri), grey (M. baibacina) and Himalayan marmots (M. himalayana), they are not known to hybridise.

Among its three subspecies, M. c. aurea is widespread and found in all countries where the species occurs, only being absent from the regions inhabited by the two remaining subspecies. M. c. caudata is from areas south of Chitral in Pakistan and adjacent parts of India, and M. c. dichrous is from highlands near Kabul and Ghazni in Afghanistan.

Overall the long-tailed marmot has a very wide altitude range, occurring from 600 to 5,200 m (2,000–17,100 ft), but this varies extensively depending on each mountain range with the upper limit essentially restricted by the location of the permanent snow line. The only countries where it has been recorded below 2,000 m (6,600 ft) are Kyrgyzstan and Tajikistan, but in both places it also occurs much higher. It is more tolerant of aridity than the closely related Menzbier's marmot and the more distantly related grey marmot, and where their distributions approach each other the long-tailed marmot tends to occupy drier habitats. Furthermore, where its distribution approaches that of the Menzbier's marmot the long-tailed occurs at lower altitudes from 1,300 to 2,200 m (4,300–7,200 ft). The long-tailed marmot occurs in a wide range of open or lightly wooded habitats, including alpine meadows, foothill to highland steppes, semi-deserts, scrublands and open woodland (typically with junipers no more than 4 m or 13 ft high), especially in rocky areas. However, it avoids places with saline soils.

== Ecology and behaviour ==
The long-tailed marmot usually forms monogamous relationships but lives in larger social groups, with up to seven adults sharing a single home range. These individuals are likely to be related to each other with young adults normally only dispersing after they have become fully grown at three or more years of age. Adult immigrants are tolerated in the group but only a single adult female normally lactates and rears young in any one season.

Home ranges of the long-tailed marmot average about three hectares (7.5 acres) and contain about three burrow systems (range one to six). In a chamber in one of these burrows the marmots hibernate from about September to April or May, a period during which the ground is covered with snow for much of the time. Different burrows may be used for hibernation in different years. Mating occurs in late April and early May and may take place underground before the marmots emerge from the burrow after the winter. The gestation period is about four and a half weeks and the litter of about four pups emerges from the nest at about six weeks of age. Only about half of the pups survive the summer, some being consumed by predators and others being killed by adult males joining the group. Most adults survive the hibernation period but a rather higher proportion of juveniles die during their first winter. Females do not usually breed as three-year-olds but wait till the following year.

The long-tailed marmot is diurnal and feeds on plant material. It is most active in the morning when about 40% of the time is spent foraging. After emerging from the burrow, the marmot spreads out and do not forage as a group. Food is either collected from the ground by the mouth or plucked from taller plants. Between bouts of foraging, a marmot sometimes stands on its back legs and surveys its surroundings. Group members communicate with each other, emitting complex alarm calls when predators are spotted. They also react to alarm calls of neighbouring groups.

=== Predators ===
Predators of the long-tailed marmot include the red fox (Vulpes vulpes), the grey wolf (Canis lupus), the golden eagle (Aquila chrysaetos) and possibly the bearded vulture (Gypaetus barbatus). On the Tibetan Plateau, marmot species also form part of snow leopard prey.

== See also ==
- Bobak marmot
