= Sarychat-Eertash Nature Reserve =

Sanctuary to preserve threatened flora & fauna in Kyrgyzstan

- IUCN category Ia (strict nature reserve)
- Location within Kyrgyzstan
- Location: Jeti-Ögüz District, Issyk-Kul Region, Kyrgyzstan
- Nearest city: Karakol
- Coordinates: 42°02′N 78°25′E
- Area: 149,118 ha (368,480 acres)
- Established: 1995

The Sarychat-Eertash Nature Reserve (Kyrgyz: Сарычат-Ээрташ мамлекеттик коругу, Russian: Сарычат-Эрташский государственный заповедник) is located in Issyk-Kul Region of Kyrgyzstan. Established in 1995, it currently covers 149,118 hectares. It was established with a purpose of conservation of unique nature complexes, rare and threatened species of flora and fauna of syrt area of Issyk-Kul Region, and maintaining regional environmental balance.

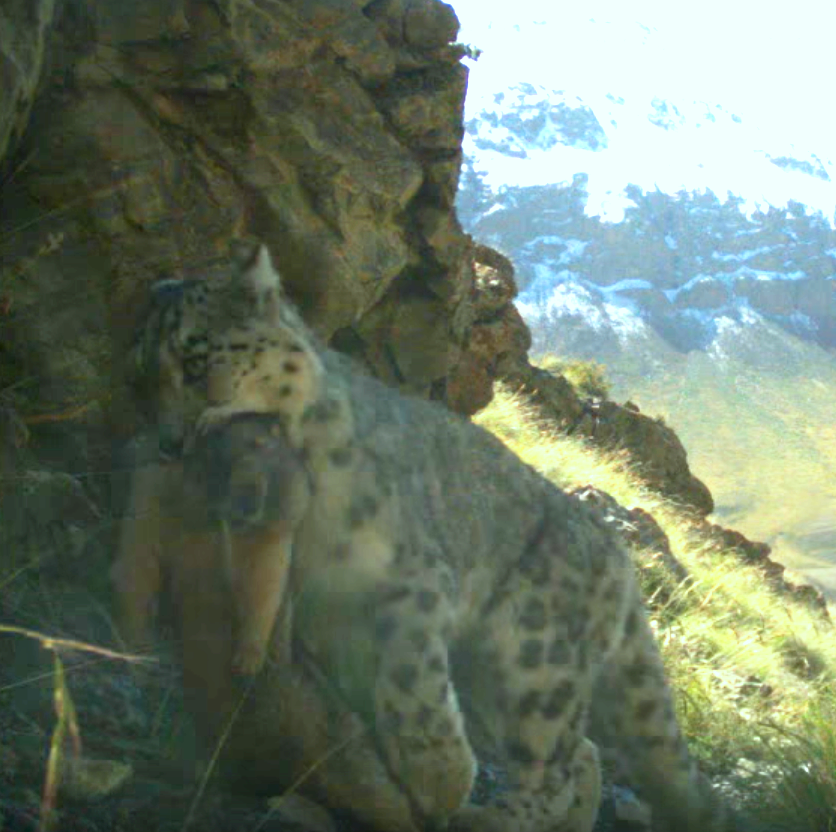
Marmot hunted by a snow leopard in Sarychat-Eertash Nature Reserve, Kyrgyzstan

The reserve was founded mainly to protect the endangered snow leopard, mountain goat and the argali, a large wild sheep of Central Asia. Other large mammals are Siberian ibex, wild boar, Eurasian lynx, Eurasian wolf and Eurasian brown bear. Smaller and medium-sized mammals, include red fox, pallas cat, stone marten, badger, tolai hare and gray marmot. The reserve is excluded of any usage, including tourism.

The nature reserve lies in the Jeti-Ögüz District, south of the Terskey Ala-too mountains. It occupies the basins of the rivers Sarychat and Bordu, tributaries of the Üchköl (Saryjaz basin).
