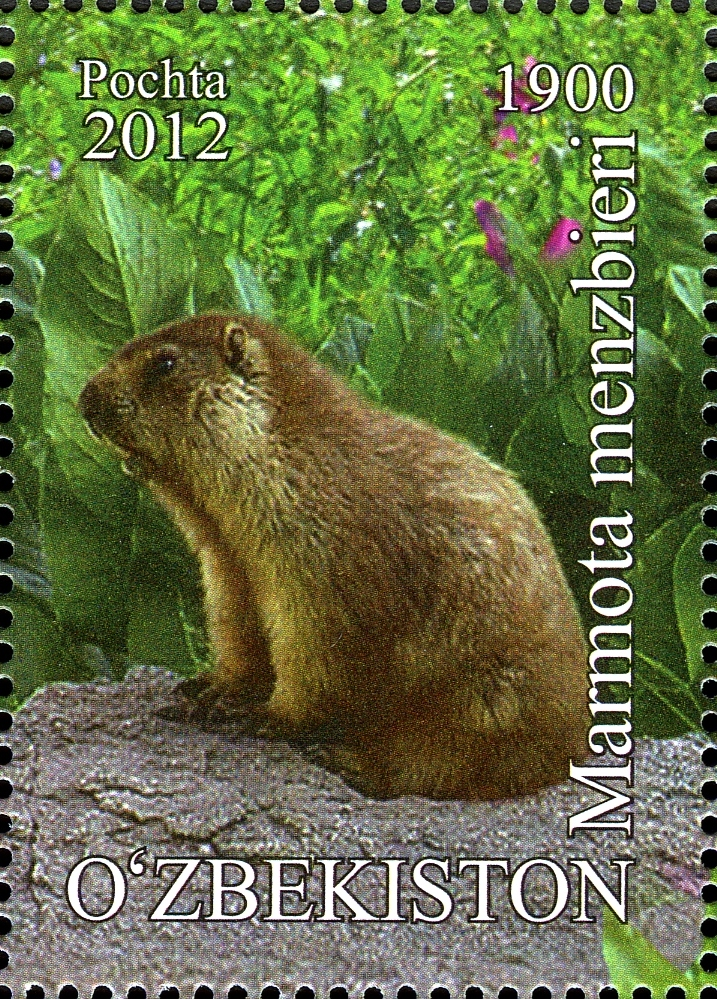
- On Uzbek stamp

Conservation status
- Vulnerable (IUCN 3.1)

Scientific classification
- Kingdom: Animalia
- Phylum: Chordata
- Class: Mammalia
- Order: Rodentia
- Family: Sciuridae
- Genus: Marmota
- Species: M. menzbieri

Binomial name
- Marmota menzbieri (Kashkarov, 1925)

= Menzbier's marmot =

Species of rodent

The Menzbier's marmot (Marmota menzbieri) is a species of rodent in the family Sciuridae from Central Asia. Its name commemorates Russian zoologist Mikhail Aleksandrovich Menzbier.

== Distribution and habitat ==
It inhabits meadows and steppe at altitudes of 2,000–3,600 m (6,600–11,800 ft) in the western Tien Shan Mountains of Kazakhstan, Kyrgyzstan, Uzbekistan and far northern Tajikistan.

== Conservation ==
It has the smallest range among the Palearctic species of marmot and tends to occur in low densities, with a population estimate in 1998 indicating that there were a total of 22,000 individuals and an estimate in 2005 indicating that there were 20,000–25,000 individuals in Kazakhstan alone. The IUCN considers it vulnerable with the main threat being habitat loss from expanding agriculture and a smaller threat being hunting for food. Locally, its range comes into contact with that of the long-tailed marmot (M. caudata) and the two form a species group, but they segregate by habitat, with the Menzbier's marmot preferring wetter areas at a higher altitude and with shorter grass.

== Description ==
It is the smallest Palearctic species of marmot with a head-and-body length if 34.5–50 cm (13.6–19.7 in) and a weight of 1.85–5 kg (4.1–11.0 lb). It is a relatively short-tailed species with a long and dense fur. Uniquely among marmots, it has dark upperparts and rear parts that contrast clearly with the pale underparts and frontal parts. Like other marmots, it gradually becomes darker overall as the season progresses.

== Taxonomy ==
The range of the Menzbier's marmot is split in two by the Pskem River and its valley. Although the two populations are very similar in their appearance, they are clearly separated genetically, leading to the recognition of the northern M. m. menzbieri and the southern subspecies M. m. zachidovi. Menzbier's marmots hibernate from August or September to April or May.
