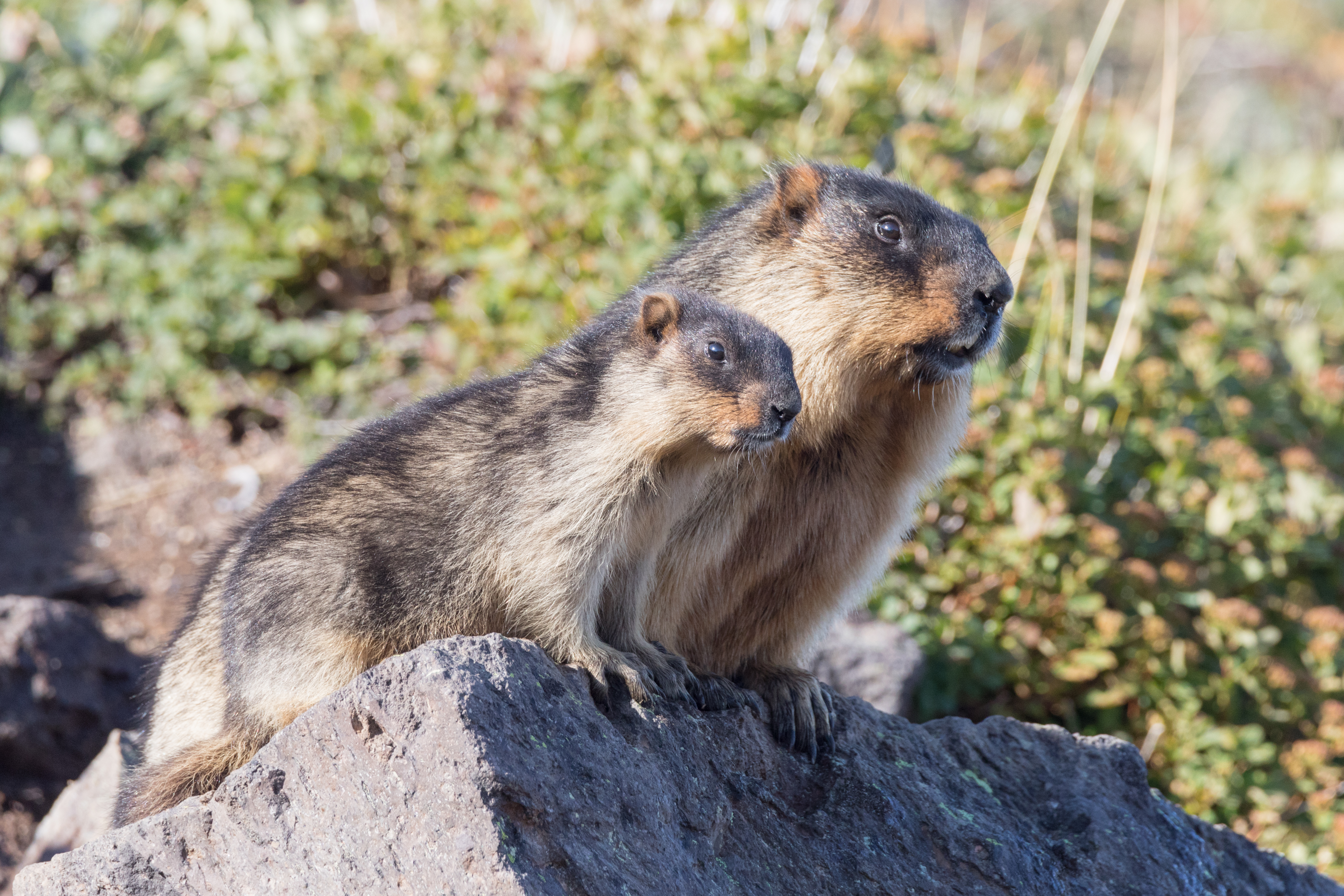

Conservation status
- Least Concern (IUCN 3.1)

Scientific classification
- Kingdom: Animalia
- Phylum: Chordata
- Class: Mammalia
- Order: Rodentia
- Family: Sciuridae
- Genus: Marmota
- Species: M. camtschatica

Binomial name
- Marmota camtschatica (Pallas, 1811)

= Black-capped marmot =

Species of rodent

The black-capped marmot (Marmota camtschatica) is a species of rodent in the family Sciuridae. It is endemic to the Russian Far East, but its range is discontinuous and divided into three main parts, each with its own subspecies. The black-capped marmot lives in arctic tundra and alpine habitats from near sea-level to an altitude of 2,000 m (6,600 ft). Depending on exact subpopulation, they hibernate for 6–8 months each year, which is long for a marmot.

== Description ==
It is a relatively small marmot (head-and-body length c. 39.5–61.5 cm or 15.6–24.2 in, weight 1.65–5.4 kg or 3.6–11.9 lb) with a short tail. The dorsal pelage is a grizzled yellowish-grey while the underparts are cinnamon or rusty brown. The limbs are rather paler while the tail is brownish-black. The upper part of the head is brownish-black, and this colour continues to the mid-back as a dorsal stripe.

== Behaviour and ecology ==
Black-capped marmots feed on grasses, herbs and mosses. They live in colonies formed from many separate burrows, each occupied by an adult pair and their offspring. A litter consists of five or six young but these stay in the family group for at least three years. The marmots congregate in larger groups to hibernate. The sleeping chamber has large quantities of bedding material and the entrances are plugged.

The black-capped marmot hibernates from September to mid-May. It is a diurnal and sedentary mammal. It is subject to extreme conditions throughout the year. The solar altitude plays a significant role in the daily activity pattern of family groups of black-capped marmots. So, the terrestrial activity of black-capped marmots is dependent on daylight period. They usually eliminate heat by lying on rocks or by entering the burrows. It also alters the soil properties that affect the floral structure and distribution of the Arctic tundra by burrowing, hibernation, trampling and reproduction. The main area (center) where the marmots live are gathered in two larger rooms typically so the family can hibernate in these areas. This is usually where the females give birth.
