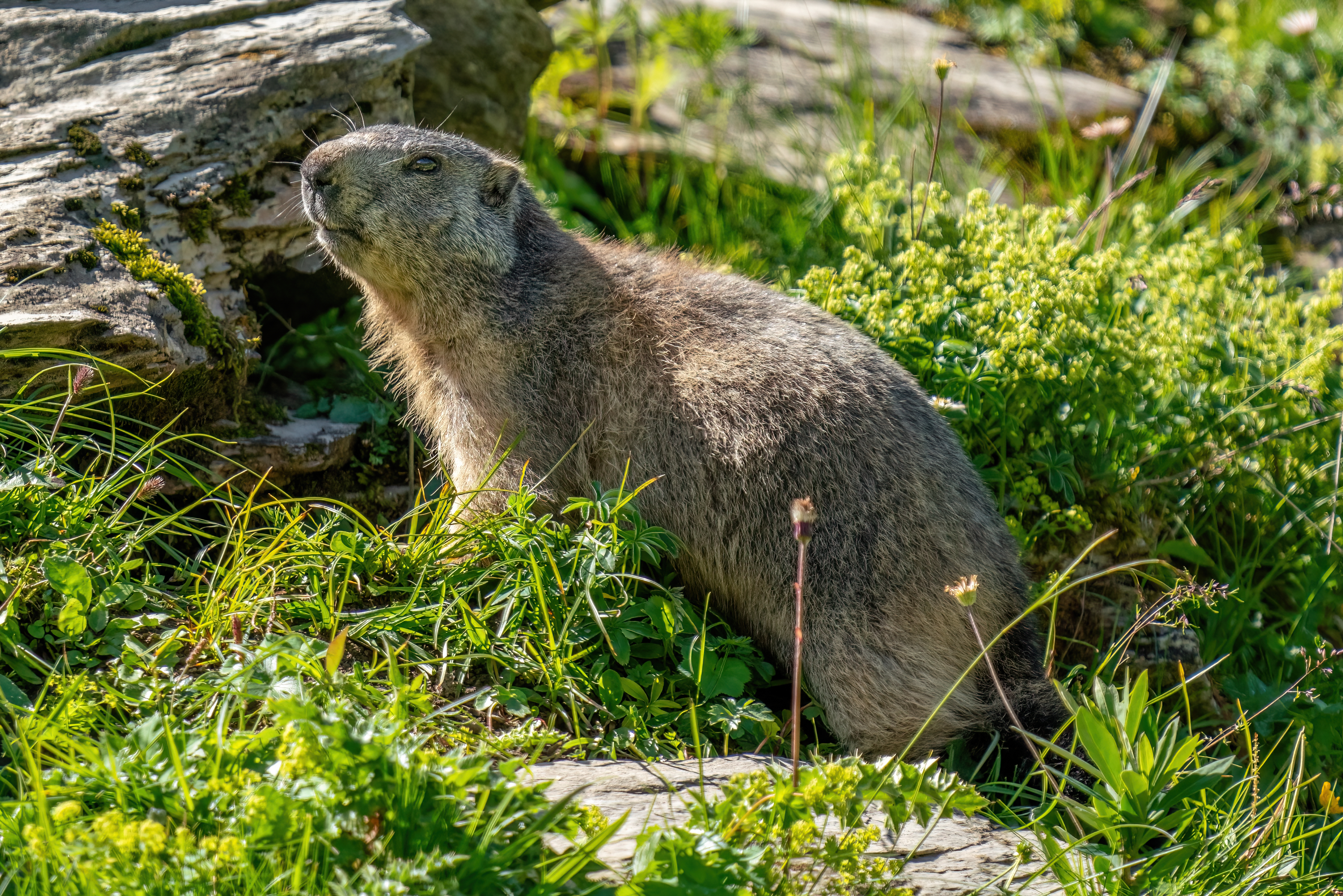
- Alpine marmot (Marmota marmota)

Scientific classification
- Kingdom: Animalia
- Phylum: Chordata
- Class: Mammalia
- Order: Rodentia
- Family: Sciuridae
- Tribe: Marmotini
- Genus: Marmota; Blumenbach, 1779

Type species
- Mus marmota Linnaeus, 1758

Species
- 15, see text

= Marmot =

Marmots Temporal range: Late Miocene – recent

Genus of mammals (large ground squirrels)

Marmots are large ground squirrels in the genus Marmota, with 15 species living in Asia, Europe, and North America. These herbivores are active during the summer, when they can often be found in groups, but are not seen during the winter, when they hibernate underground. They are the heaviest and largest members of the squirrel family.

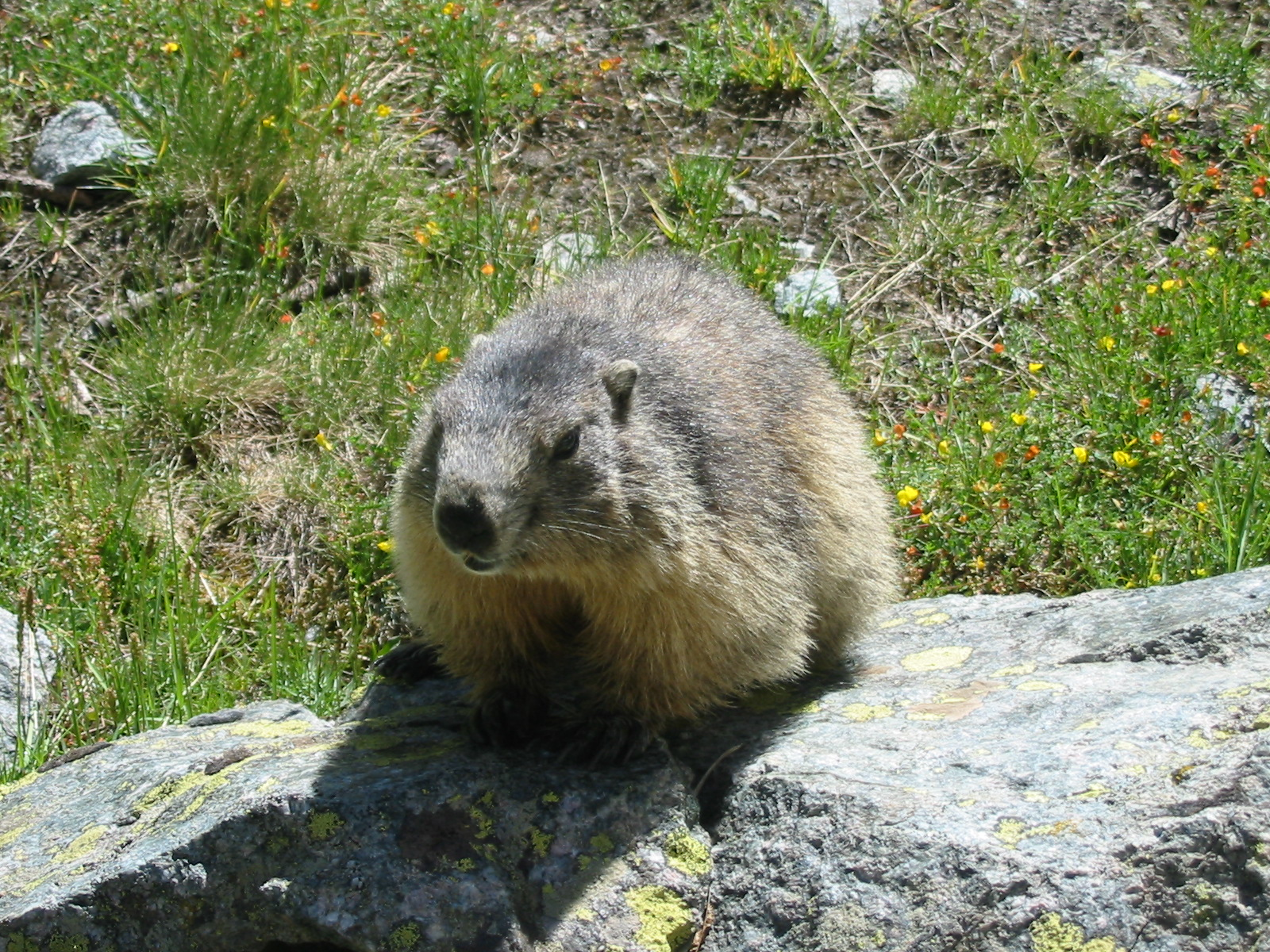
Marmot in its natural habitat

== Description ==
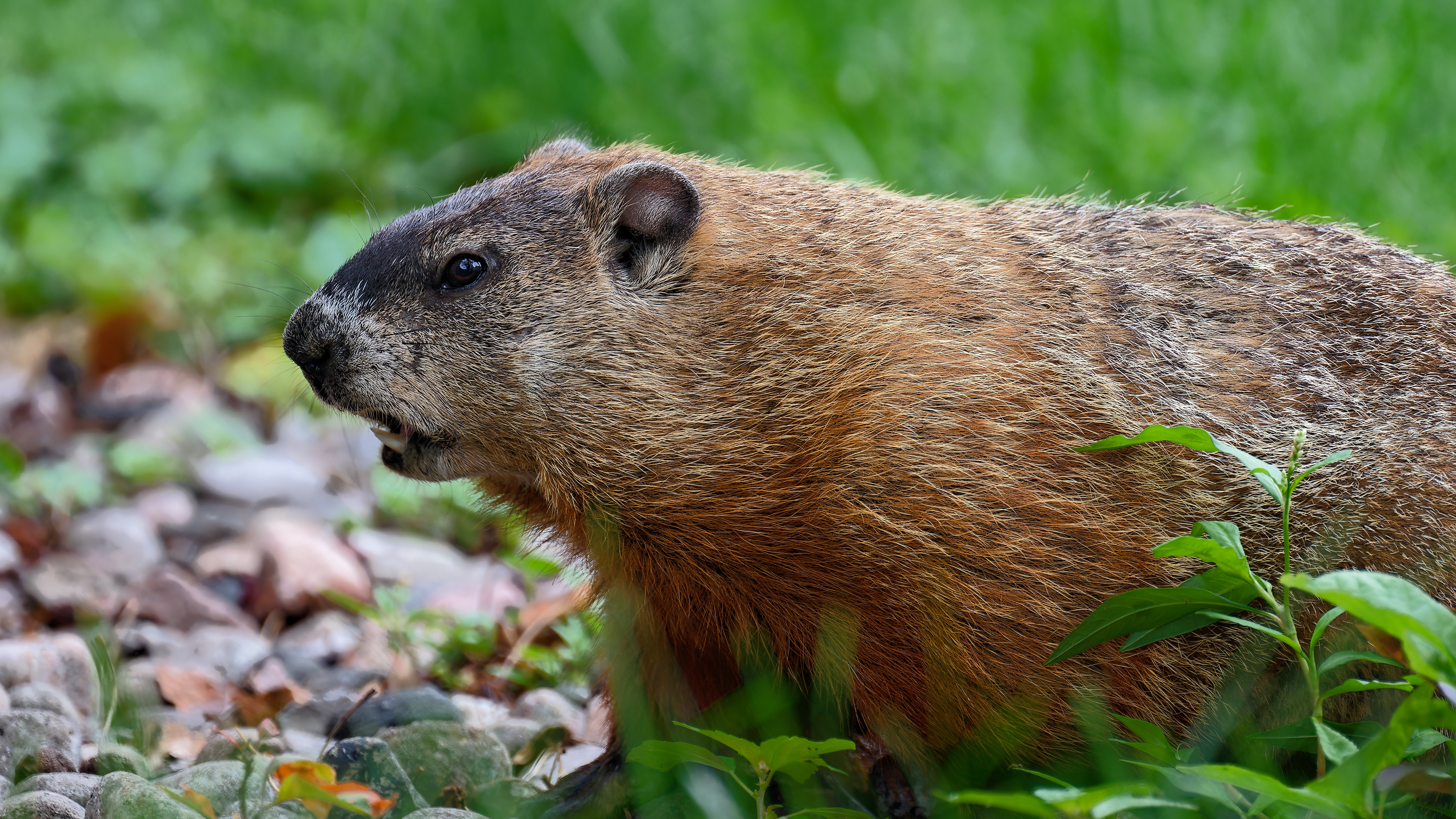
North American marmot, Montreal, Canada

Marmots are large rodents with characteristically short but robust legs, enlarged claws that are well adapted to digging, stout bodies, and large heads and incisors to quickly process a variety of vegetation. While most species are various forms of earthen-hued brown, marmots vary in fur coloration based roughly on their surroundings. Species found in more open habitats are more likely to be paler color, while those found in well-forested regions tend to be darker.

Total length varies typically from about 42 to 72 cm (17 to 28 in) and body mass averages about 2 kg (4 1/2 lb) in spring in the smaller species and 8 kg (18 lb) in autumn, at times exceeding 11 kg (24 lb), in the larger species. The largest and smallest species are not clearly known. In North America, on the basis of mean linear dimensions and body masses through the year, the smallest species appears to be the Alaska marmot and the largest is the Olympic marmot. Some species, such as the Himalayan marmot and Tarbagan marmot in Asia, appear to attain roughly similar body masses to the Olympic marmot, but are not known to reach as high a total length as the Olympic species.

Using the traditional definition of hibernation, the largest marmots are considered the largest "true hibernators", since larger "hibernators" such as bears do not have the same physiological characteristics as obligate hibernating animals such as assorted rodents, bats and insectivores.

== Biology ==
Some species live in mountainous areas, such as the Alps, northern Apennines, Carpathians, Tatras, and Pyrenees in Europe; northwestern Asia; the Rocky Mountains, Black Hills, the Cascade and Pacific Ranges, and the Sierra Nevada in North America; and the Deosai Plateau in Pakistan and Ladakh in India. Other species prefer rough grassland and can be found widely across North America and the Eurasian Steppe. The slightly smaller and more social prairie dog is not classified in the genus Marmota, but in the related genus Cynomys.

Marmots typically live in burrows (often within rockpiles, particularly in the case of the yellow-bellied marmot), and hibernate there through the winter. Most marmots are highly social and use loud whistles to communicate with one another, especially when alarmed.

Marmots mainly eat greens and many types of grasses, berries, lichens, mosses, roots, and flowers.

An alpine marmot eating flowers

== Subgenera and species ==
The following is a list of all Marmota species recognized by Thorington and Hoffman plus the recently defined M. kastschenkoi. They divide marmots into two subgenera.

Subgenus	Image	Name	Common name	Distribution
Marmota		Marmota baibacina	Gray marmot or Altai marmot	Siberia
Marmota		Marmota bobak	Bobak marmot	eastern Europe to central Asia
Marmota		Marmota broweri	Alaska marmot, Brower's marmot, or Brooks Range marmot	Alaska
Marmota		Marmota camtschatica	Black-capped marmot	eastern Siberia
Marmota		Marmota caudata	Long-tailed marmot, golden marmot, or red marmot	central Asia
Marmota		Marmota himalayana	Himalayan marmot or Tibetan snow pig	the Himalayas
Marmota		Marmota kastschenkoi	Forest-steppe marmot	south Russia
Marmota		Marmota marmota	Alpine marmot	Europe only in the Alps, Carpathian Mountains, Tatra Mountains, northern Apennine Mountains, and reintroduced in the Pyrenees
Marmota		Marmota menzbieri	Menzbier's marmot	central Asia
Marmota		Marmota monax	Groundhog, woodchuck, or whistle pig	Canada and eastern United States
Marmota		Marmota sibirica	Tarbagan marmot, Mongolian marmot, or tarvaga	Siberia
Petromarmota		Marmota caligata	Hoary marmot	northwestern North America (Alaska, Yukon, British Columbia, Alberta, Washington, Montana)
Petromarmota		Marmota flaviventris	Yellow-bellied marmot	southwestern Canada and western United States
Petromarmota		Marmota olympus	Olympic marmot	endemic to the Olympic Peninsula, Washington, United States
Petromarmota		Marmota vancouverensis	Vancouver Island marmot	endemic to Vancouver Island, British Columbia, Canada

Some extinct species of marmots are recognized from the fossil record, for example:

- †Marmota arizonae, Arizona, U.S.
- †Marmota minor, Nevada, U.S.
- †Marmota vetus, Nebraska, U.S.

== History and etymology ==
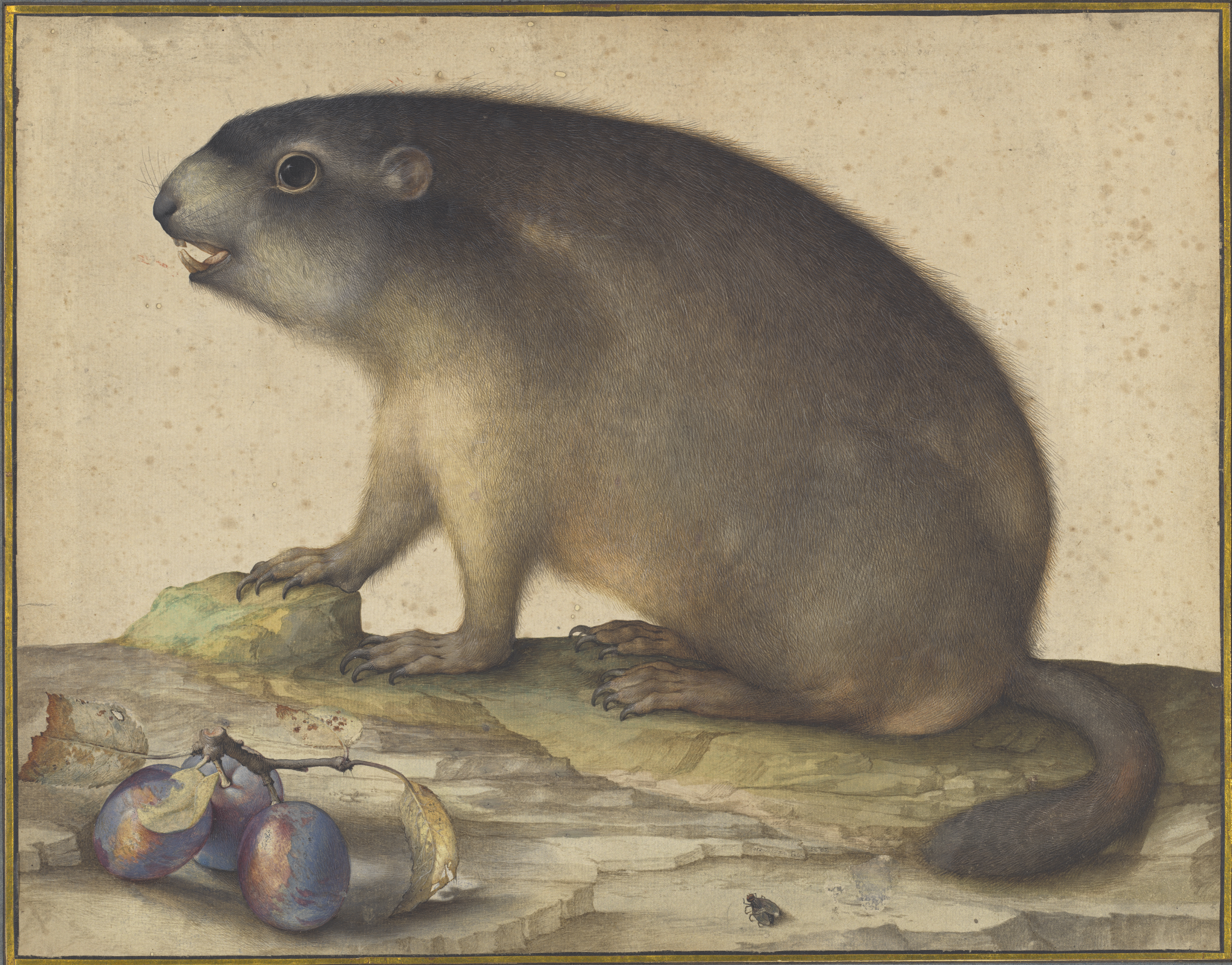
A Marmot with a Branch of Plums, 1605 by Jacopo Ligozzi

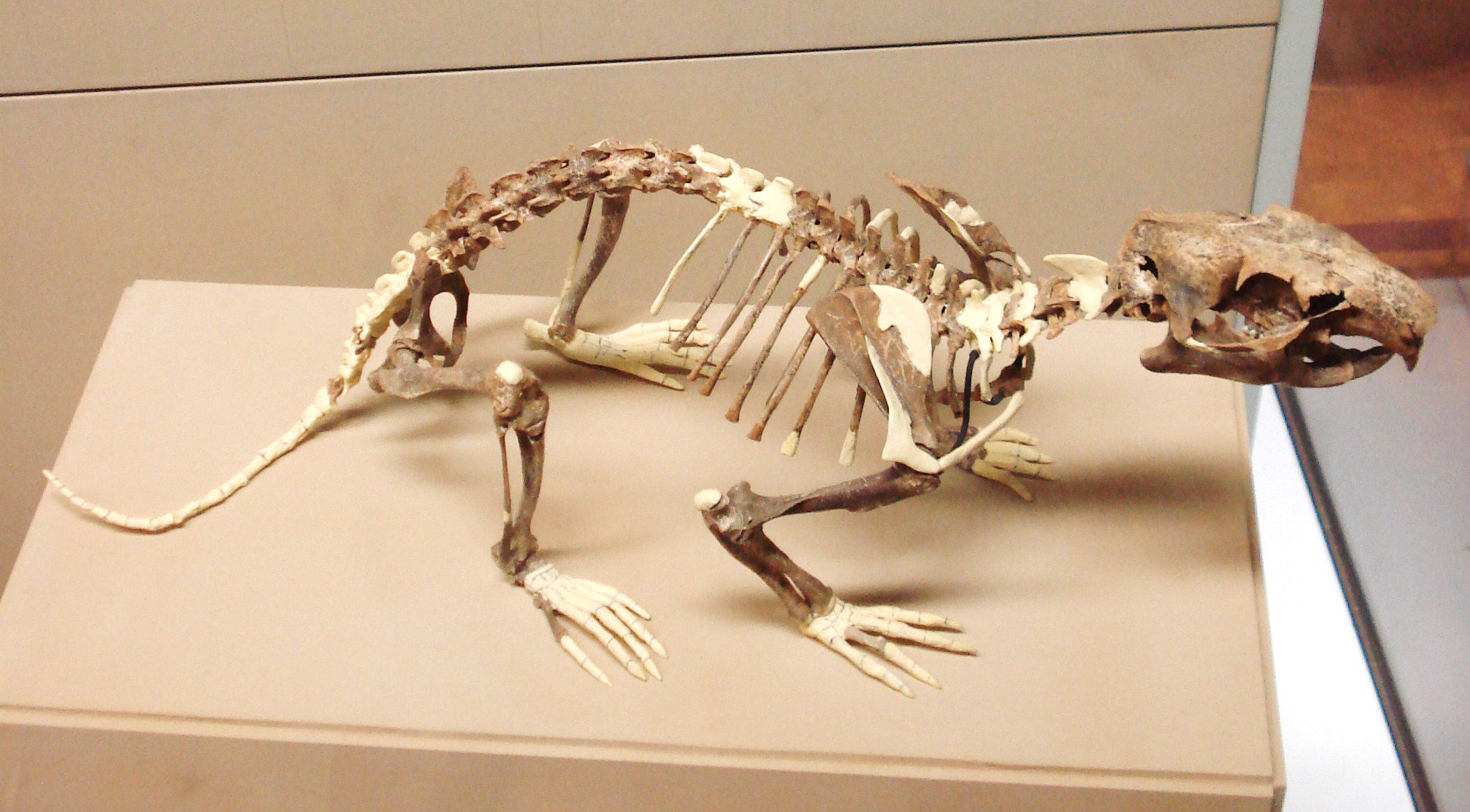
Marmota primigenia fossil

Marmots have been known since antiquity. Research by the French ethnologist Michel Peissel claimed the story of the "Gold-digging ant" reported by the Ancient Greek historian Herodotus, who lived in the fifth century BCE, was founded on the golden Himalayan marmot of the Deosai Plateau and the habit of local tribes such as the Brokpa to collect the gold dust excavated from their burrows. Some historians believe that Strabo's λέων μύρμηξ (léōn mýrmēx), and Agatharchides's μυρμηκολέων (myrmēkoléōn), most probably are the marmot.

An anatomically accurate image of a marmot was printed and distributed as early as 1605 by Jacopo Ligozzi, who was noted for his images of flora and fauna.

The etymology of the term "marmot" is uncertain. It may have arisen from the Gallo-Romance prefix marm-, meaning to mumble or murmur (an example of onomatopoeia). Another possible origin is postclassical Latin, mus montanus, meaning "mountain mouse".

They historically formed part of the diet of Swiss Alpine peasants.

Beginning in 2010, Alaska celebrates February 2 as "Marmot Day", a holiday intended to observe the prevalence of marmots in that state and take the place of Groundhog Day.

=== Relationship to the Black Death ===
Some historians and paleogeneticists have postulated that marmots might be among the natural reservoir species for the Yersinia pestis variant that caused the Black Death pandemic, which swept across Eurasia in the 14th century.
