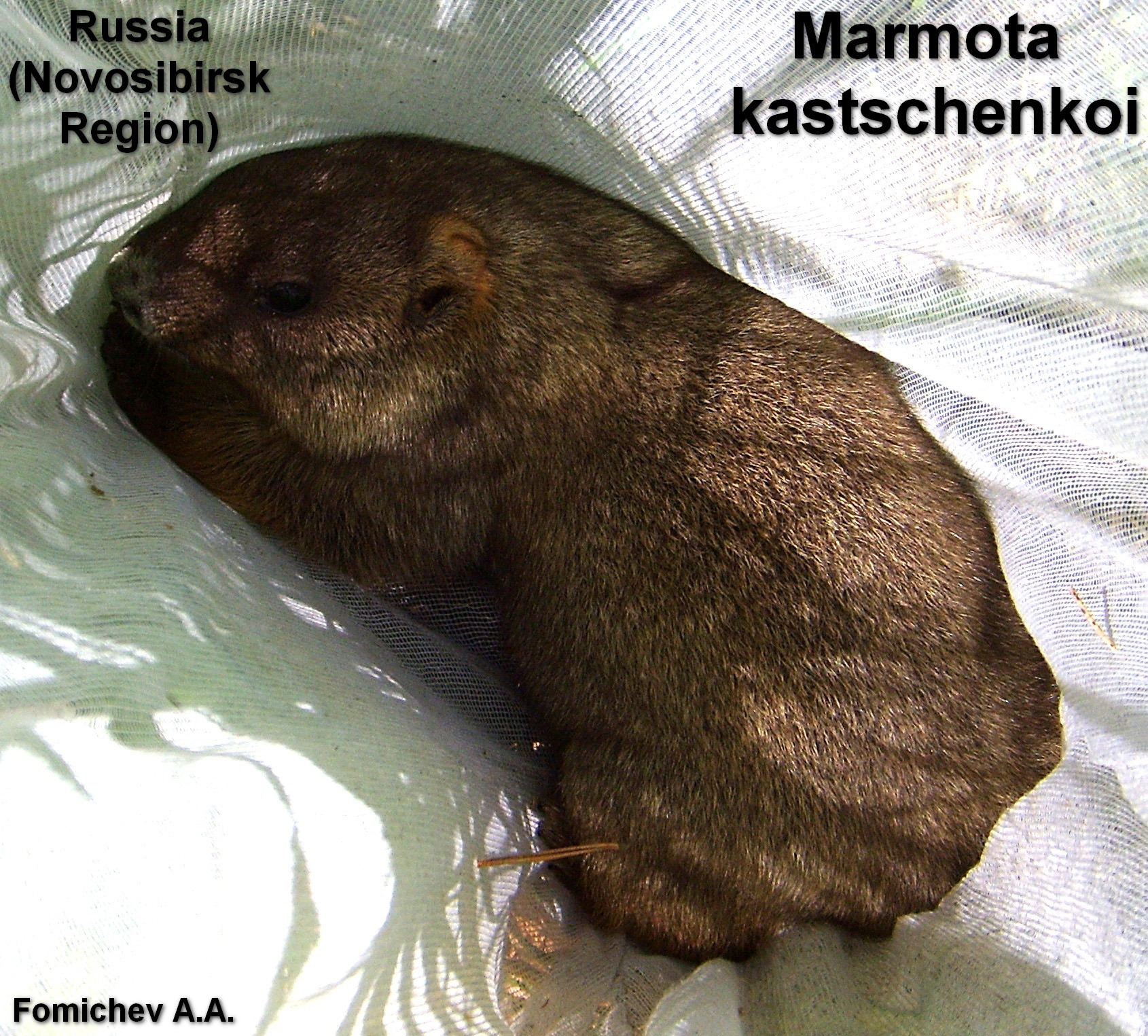

Scientific classification
- Domain: Eukaryota
- Kingdom: Animalia
- Phylum: Chordata
- Class: Mammalia
- Order: Rodentia
- Family: Sciuridae
- Genus: Marmota
- Species: M. kastschenkoi

Binomial name
- Marmota kastschenkoi Stroganov and Yudin, 1956

= Forest-steppe marmot =

Species of rodent

The forest-steppe marmot (Marmota kastschenkoi) is a rodent species of the marmot genus found in south-central Russia. It lives in wooded forest steppe at an altitude of 180–450 m (590–1,480 ft) in a relatively small region located directly east of the upper Ob River. It has traditionally been considered a subspecies of the similar, more southerly distributed gray marmot (M. baibacina), but was separated mainly due to different diploid numbers.

== Description ==
Forest-steppe marmots have a head-and-body length of 45–66 cm (18–26 in), and light individuals weigh as little as 3 kg (6.6 lb) in the spring (after hibernation) and heavy individuals as much as 8.9 kg (20 lb) in the autumn (before hibernation). It hibernates for about 6 1/2 months starting in August or September.

== Population ==
In 2011, it was estimated that the forest-steppe marmot population consisted of about 14,000–16,000 individuals and had been stable over the last several decades, but earlier estimates have been both somewhat above and significantly below this figure.
