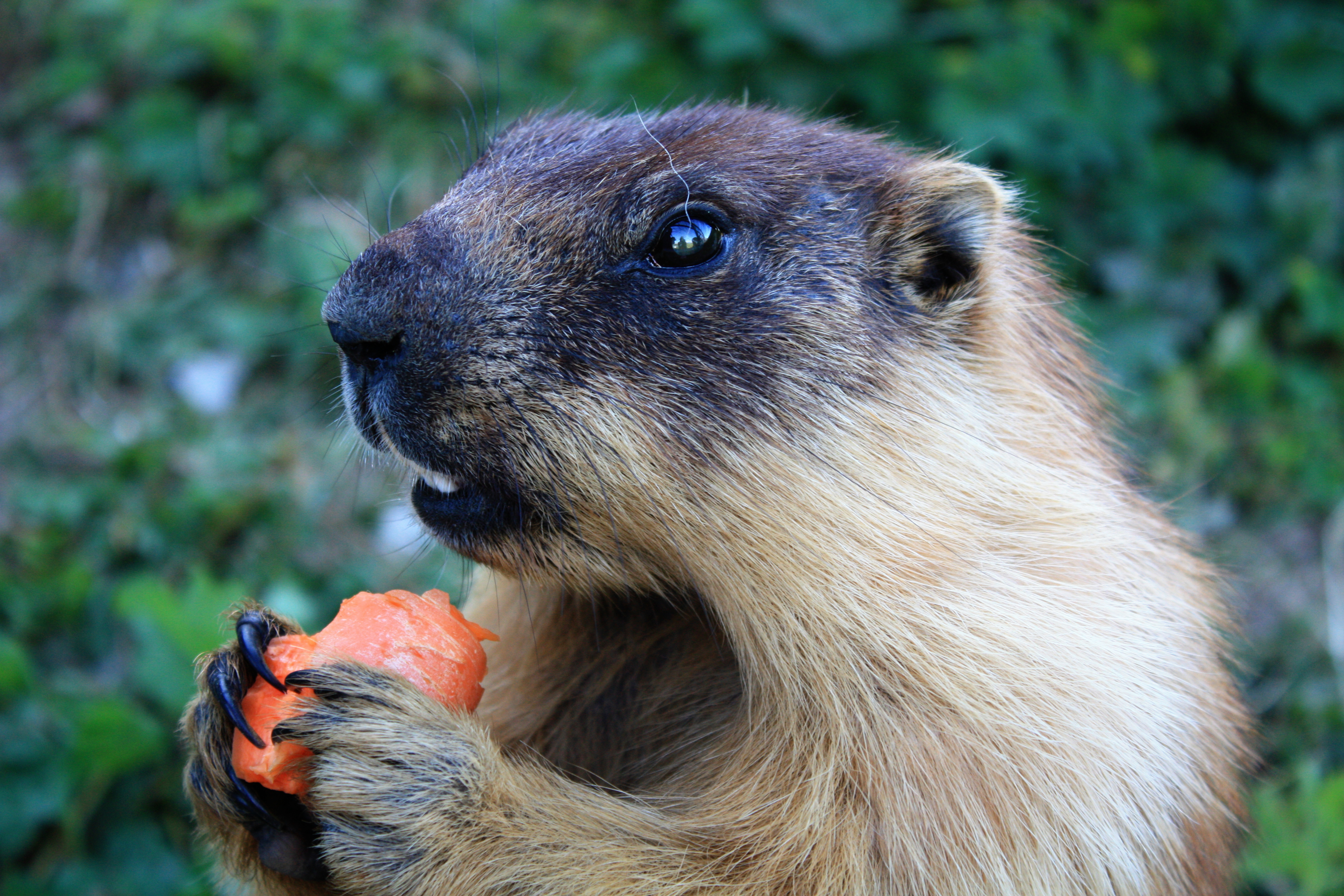

Conservation status
- Endangered (IUCN 3.1)

Scientific classification
- Kingdom: Animalia
- Phylum: Chordata
- Class: Mammalia
- Order: Rodentia
- Family: Sciuridae
- Genus: Marmota
- Species: M. sibirica

Binomial name
- Marmota sibirica (Radde, 1862)

= Tarbagan marmot =

Species of mammal

The tarbagan marmot (Marmota sibirica) is a species of rodent in the family Sciuridae. It is found in China (Inner Mongolia and Heilongjiang), northern and western Mongolia, and Russia (southwest Siberia, Tuva, Transbaikalia). In the Mongolian Altai Mountains, its range overlaps with that of the gray marmot. The species was classified as endangered by the IUCN in 2008.

Two subspecies are recognized, M. s. sibirica and M. s. caliginosus.

== Etymology ==
The word "tarbagan" comes from Russian тарбаган (tarbagan), which originates from Proto-Mongolic and denotes specific rodent species; it is related to "targa", the word for beaver in the Ulch and Nanai languages. Other names for the tarbagan marmot include Siberian marmot and Mongolian marmot.

== Description and ecology ==
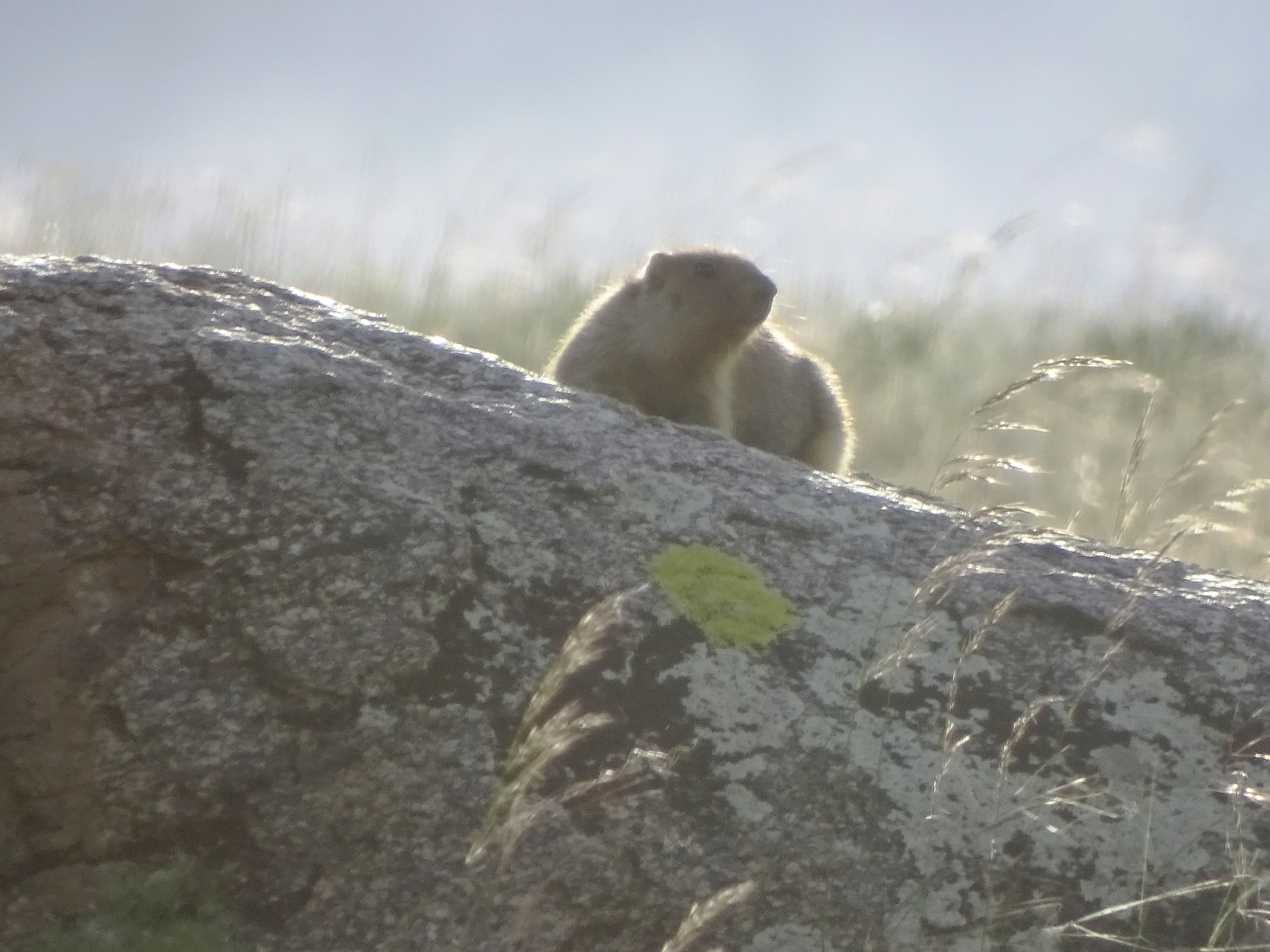
Two tarbagan marmots on a rock

The tarbagan marmot is medium-sized compared to other marmots, with a 0.25 head-to-body ratio. During the summer, its hair is between 11–20 mm and grows up to 30 mm during winter months. Its fur has two separate slate bands, followed by a white band, and its cheeks are yellow. Its zygomatic arches are slightly expanded compared to other marmot species. Populations in western Mongolia tend to have wider skulls compared to other tarbagan marmots. Males tend to weigh more than females and are larger, both having an average weight of 6–8 kg. The tarabagan marmot is one of the two only marmot species to inhabit lowland areas, the other being the groundhog. The tarbagan marmot is herbivorous, like all other marmots, and consumes steppe grasses.

It is mainly found throughout Mongolia, with its range extending west to the Altai Mountains, east to Inner Mongolia, north to Transbaikal, and south to the Dzungarian Basin, in the Gobi Desert.

== As a disease carrier ==
Epizootics occur in tarbagan marmots in northeastern China and Mongolia, such as the Manchurian plague of 1910–1911. The plague in marmots is of the pneumonic form, spread by coughing. The diseases can jump from marmots to humans through the bite of the tarbagan flea (Ceratophyllus silantievi), or through consumption of tarbagan meat. Marmot epizootics are known to co-occur with human epidemics in the same area. Human plague epidemics in this area are largely pneumonic, the most deadly form of plague. In 2019, a Mongolian couple died of plague after eating raw marmot meat.

=== As a game animal ===
The tarbagan marmot has been eaten for centuries in the native cuisine of Mongolia, and in particular in a local dish called boodog. The meat is cooked by inserting hot stones, preheated in a fire, into the abdominal cavity of a deboned marmot. The skin is then tied up to make a bag, within which the meat cooks. Hunting of marmots for food is typically done in autumn, when the animals are heavier, since they are preparing for hibernation.

The Russian explorer Richard Maack, who encountered tarbagans in the Ingoda Valley in Siberia, described the tarbagan hunt as follows:

Hunting the tarbagan is quite difficult. It is not easy to approach to a tarbagan within a rifle shot; besides, the wary animal never goes far from its burrow, and, if it is not killed right away, always manage to hide in the burrow. In that case one needs to dig it out, which involves a lot of labor, as tarbagans' burrows are quite deep.

== Benefits to the environment ==
The tarbagan marmot is known to be an ecosystem engineer as it provides various resources to other organisms. Within the landscape, tarbagan marmot burrows provide a network of basking sites for thermoregulation, feeding areas, and refuges for other species, possibly leading to a more suitable habitat and increased survivability. In addition, for raptors and carnivorous species like gray wolves and golden eagles, tarbagan marmots are a significant source of food.
