= Gray marmot =

- Gray marmot in Kazakhstan

Conservation status
- Least Concern (IUCN 3.1)

Scientific classification
- Kingdom: Animalia
- Phylum: Chordata
- Class: Mammalia
- Order: Rodentia
- Family: Sciuridae
- Genus: Marmota
- Species: M. baibacina

Binomial name
- Marmota baibacina Kastschenko, 1899

Species of rodent

The gray marmot, grey marmot, or Altai marmot (Marmota baibacina) is a species of rodent in the squirrel family Sciuridae. It is one of the larger marmots in the genus Marmota. It occurs in mountainous grasslands and shrub lands of central Asia, and is one of the 9 Palearctic (Eurasia) species. It is found in Xinjiang Province in China, southeastern Kazakhstan, Kyrgyzstan, Mongolia, and in the Altai and Tien Shan Mountains in southeastern Siberia in Russia. In the Mongolian Altai, its range overlaps with that of the Tarbagan marmot. Gray marmots form social groups, live in burrows, and hibernate.

== Description ==
Gray marmots are one of the largest palearctic species, weighing 4 to 6.5 kg (9 to 14.5 pounds), with some individuals reaching near 8 kg (18 pounds) before hibernation. Body size varies based on the time of year (before/after hibernation), and with latitude and elevation. Overall, body size increases at higher latitude and elevation and decreases at lower latitudes and elevation. Gray marmots may lose up to 30% of body mass during long seasonal hibernation. They are short and stocky with brawny limbs and short tails. The total body length ranges from about 60 to 80 cm (25 to 30 inches) which includes the 13-to-15-centimetre-long (5 to 6 in) tail. Forefeet have 4 digits and strong claws for digging, while the hindfeet have 5 digits. On the dorsal (back) side, the fur is beige to tan with brown to black hairs or hair tips blended throughout giving the coat a gray appearance. The ventral (belly) side is a more orange-reddish brown. The length of the tail is much like the body but has a dark brown to black tip. The ears are small and round and light colored. The face is darker brown at the cheeks with lighter yellowish brown around the mouth. Albinism occurs in this species. Gray marmots are not known to exhibit sexual dimorphism (differences between males and females), but in most marmot species the adult males are larger than adult females. Gray marmots also have cheek glands and anal glands.

== Distribution and habitat ==
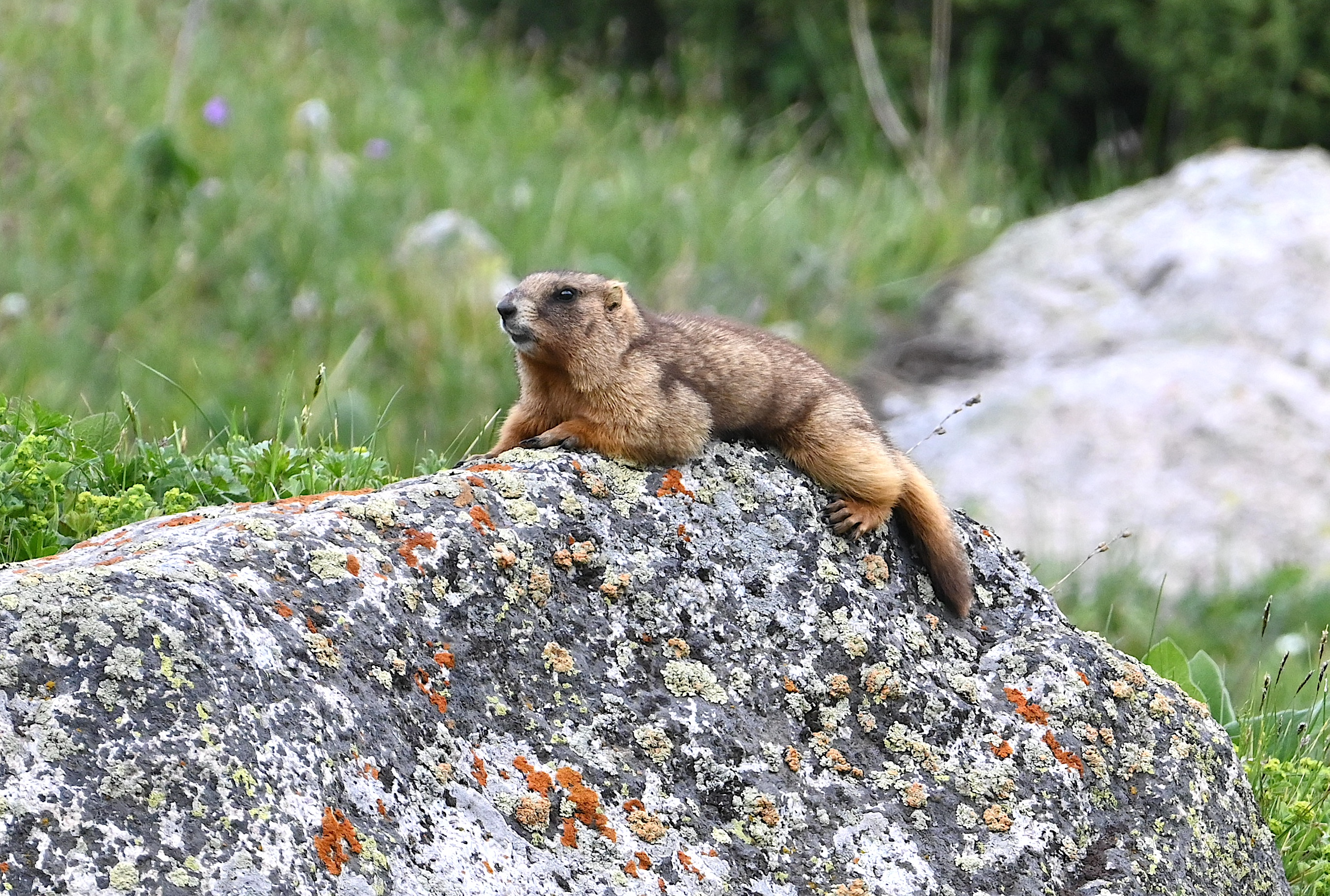
A gray marmot at Ile-Alatau National Park, Kazakhstan

Gray marmots live in mountain meadows and steppes, where they forage on sage bush in the spring, grasses and flowering plants in summer and fall. They occur in elevations from 150 to 4,000 m (490 to 13,120 feet), but may prefer mild to moderate well draining slopes with suitable soil for burrowing. The soil ranges from fine grained soft soil to soil including sand or pebbles. Their distribution extends from the Altai mountains of southwestern Siberia (Tuva, Russia), western Mongolia, northwestern China (Xinjiang), and eastern Kazakhstan, into the Tien Shan mountains of northwestern China, Kyrgyzstan, and southeastern Kazakhstan. In southeastern Kazakhstan and southwestern Siberia the range enters lower elevation, dry steppes. The gray marmot is an introduced species in the Caucasus mountains of Dagestan, Russia. In the Altai mountains of western Mongolia, the range overlaps with the Tarbagan marmot (Marmota sibirica). In this area of range overlap, competition restricts the gray marmot habitat to elevations above 3,000 m (9,800 feet) in areas with scattered boulders and rocks. Observation of hybridization between the two species and living in the same area are rare.

== Fossil record ==
Fossils of the gray marmot are known from Denisova Cave, famous for being the site of the discovery of the first remains of Denisovans.

== Life history and behavior ==
=== Sociality ===
Gray marmots live in social groups called extended families with multiple individuals living in a burrow and several burrows forming a colony. The extended families usually consist of a pair of dominant adults and a few subordinate adults, yearling and babies. Gray marmots also have species specific alarm calls, which can be used to distinguish them from other species. When environmental conditions are harsh extended families are limited. When conditions are moderate to good the extended families become more complex.

=== Hibernation ===
Gray marmots live in harsh environments with snowfall limiting food for a significant amount of time. They have evolved a yearly pattern of hibernation, reproduction, growth and then fattening for the next hibernation. Gray marmots hibernate for 7–8 months starting in fall and emerging in May. Hibernation starts between August and October depending on the location of the population, and populations at lower altitude or on south facing slopes emerge sooner.

=== Burrows ===
Gray marmots dig extensive winter burrows for hibernation, reaching depths of 5–7 m (15–25 feet) with some tunnels up to 63 m (205 feet) long. Winter burrows hold 10 or more individuals which helps them stay warm with less energy use. Summer burrows are less deep and hold only a few individuals.

=== Reproduction ===
Gray marmots mate in early May, and often mate in burrows before they emerge from hibernation. Mating may be monogamous or polyandrous. Gestation last 40 days and the female gives birth to 2–6 babies. Females reach reproductive maturity at 2–3 years. Females alternate years of reproduction, and reabsorb embryos in harsh environmental conditions.

=== Predators ===
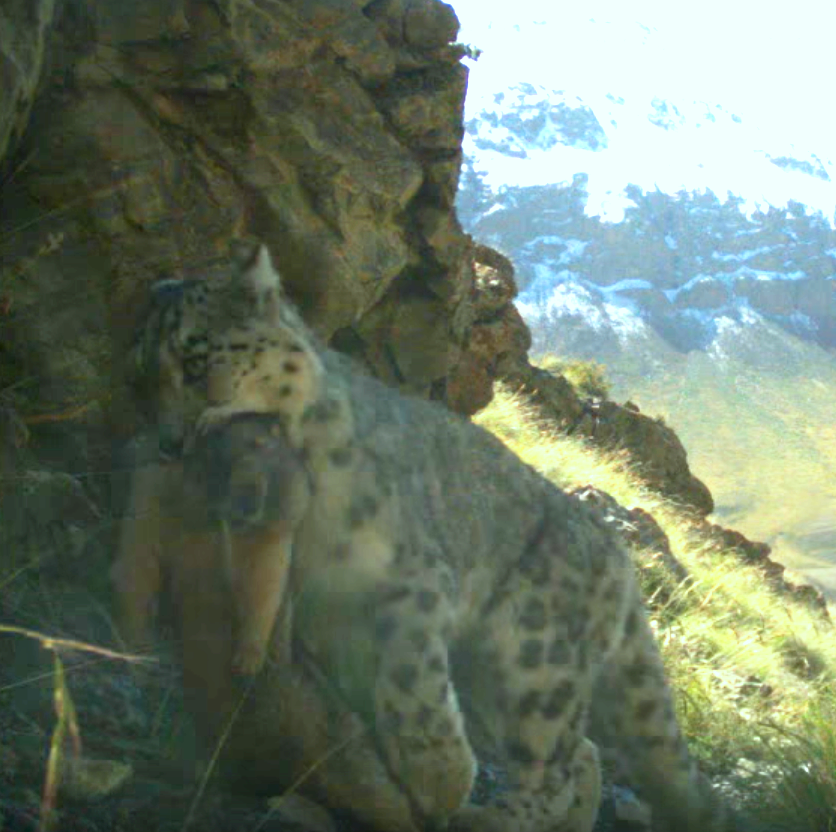
Marmot hunted by a snow leopard in Sarychat-Eertash Nature Reserve, Kyrgyzstan

Predators of gray marmots include wolves, foxes, dogs, polecats, Pallas's cat, and predator birds such as hawks and falcons. Gray marmots use alarm calls to warn family members of predator presence.

=== Communication ===
Gray marmots have anal and cheek glands used for communication of dominance and possibly defense. They use tail movements as visual cues, and various vocalizations such a growls, high pitched cries, whining and alarm calls.

== Taxonomy ==
The gray marmot is a palearctic species in the subgenus Marmota. It is most related to the forest-steppe marmot (Marmota kastschenkoi), which was considered a subspecies of the gray marmot until recently recognized a distinct species. The bobak marmot (Marmota bobak) is a sister group to these species and the lineage the gray marmot is thought to evolve from. The gray marmot has two recognized subspecies Marmota baibacina baibacina and Marmota baibacina centralis.
