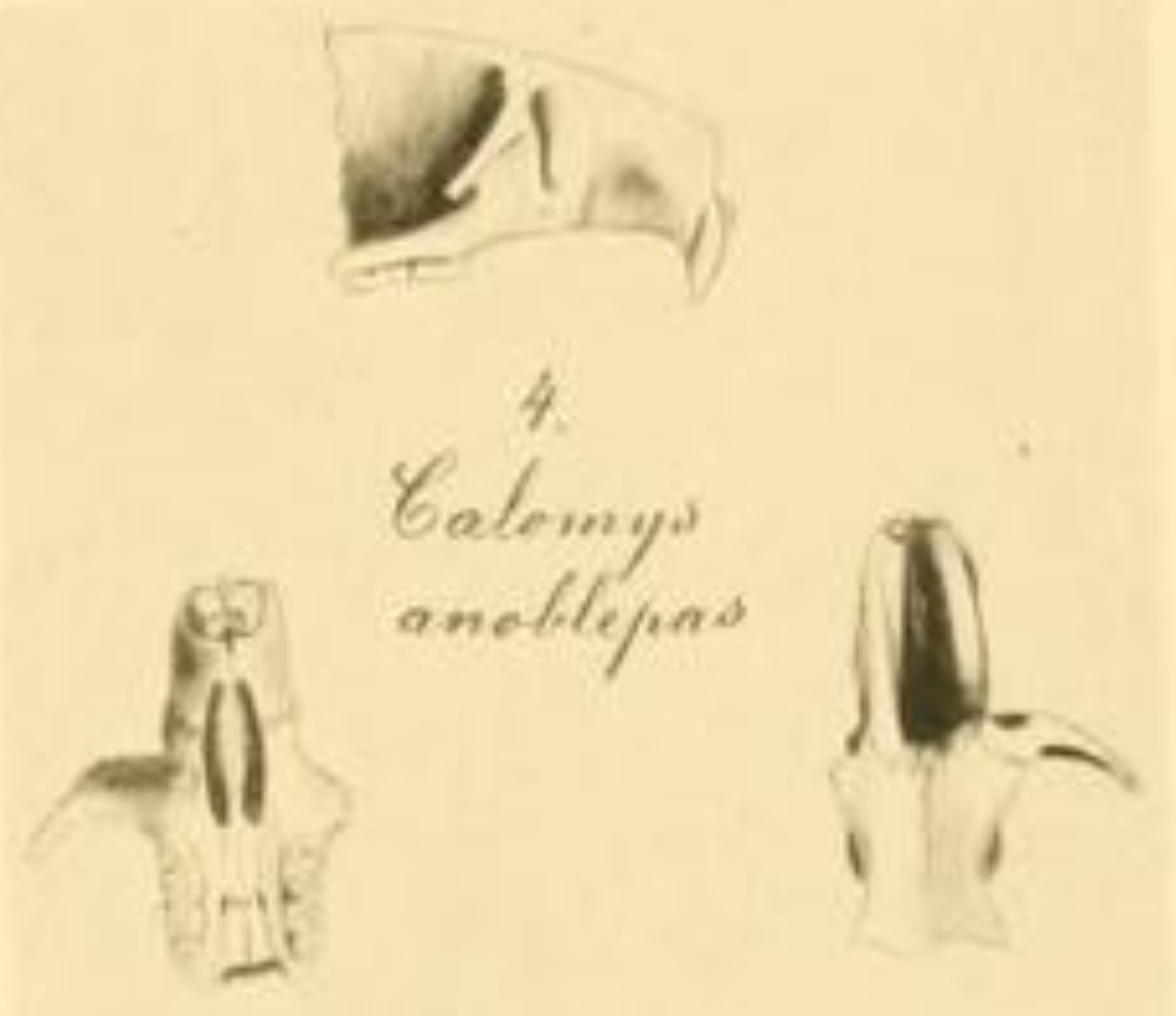
- Front half of the skull of Juliomys anoblepas, seen from the right, above, and below.

Scientific classification
- Domain: Eukaryota
- Kingdom: Animalia
- Phylum: Chordata
- Class: Mammalia
- Order: Rodentia
- Family: Cricetidae
- Subfamily: Sigmodontinae
- Genus: Juliomys
- Species: †J. anoblepas

Binomial name
- †Juliomys anoblepas (Winge, 1888)

Synonyms
- Calomys anoblepas Winge, 1888; Oryzomys anoblepas: Trouessart, 1898; Juliomys anoblepas: Pardiñas and Teta, 2011

= Juliomys anoblepas =

Species of rodent

Juliomys anoblepas is a rodent in the genus Juliomys of the subfamily Sigmodontinae known from a single broken skull. The specimen was collected by Peter Wilhelm Lund in the caves of Lagoa Santa, Minas Gerais, Brazil, in the first half of the 19th century and described by Herluf Winge in 1888 as Calomys anoblepas. The species remained unstudied and its affinities unclear until 2011, when it was recognized as a member of the genus Juliomys, which includes three other species from southern Brazil and nearby Argentina and Paraguay. J. anoblepas is probably a separate extinct species of the genus, which is no longer found at Lagoa Santa.

Juliomys anoblepas is similar to the other members of its genus in the configuration of its zygomatic plate (a bony plate on the side of the skull). It hardly extends forward in front of the connection between the plate and the main body of the skull, and that connection is relatively low on the skull. Furthermore, the incisive foramina, openings in the front part of the palate, extend to a point between the first molars, and the palate is short, with its back margin between the third molars. The living species of Juliomys differ from J. anoblepas in various characters, including shorter incisive foramina in two species and the shape of the zygomatic arch (cheekbone) in J. anoblepas. The upper molar row is 4.13 mm long, which makes J. anoblepas the largest known species of Juliomys.

== Taxonomy ==
Between 1835 and 1849, Danish zoologist Peter Wilhelm Lund collected abundant remains of mammals around the village of Lagoa Santa in Brazil. After his death, his fellow Dane Herluf Winge described Lund's collections in detail, among many others publishing a monograph about the rodents of the collection in 1888. Winge described numerous new species, many of which received little attention from systematists afterward, and among these is the species he named Calomys anoblepas. The specific name, anoblepas, derives from the Greek ἄνω (ano) "upwards" and βλέπω (blepo) "to look" and thus means "looking upward". Although Winge did not explain the name, it most likely refers to the zygomatic plate (a bone plate at the side of the skull), which is bended outward. Winge understood the genus Calomys in a sense very different from that used today, including in it the species Calomys longicaudatus (currently Oligoryzomys nigripes), Calomys coronatus (currently Euryoryzomys russatus), Calomys rex (currently Sooretamys angouya), Calomys laticeps (currently Cerradomys subflavus), Calomys saltator (currently Hylaeamys laticeps), and Calomys plebejus (currently Delomys, species uncertain). He wrote that C. anoblepas was the most divergent of the species of Calomys, but that it was similar to C. longicaudatus.

Winge's concept of the genus Calomys essentially included unspecialized species with pentalophodont molars, which are characterized by the presence of a crest known as the mesoloph on the upper and mesolophid on the lower molars, and excluded species now placed in Calomys, which he classified in Hesperomys instead. Since 1898, authors have placed Winge's Calomys species in Oryzomys, conforming to the more conventional taxonomic arrangement; after that, the species was referred to as Oryzomys anoblepas. Over many decades, the identity of most of Winge's species remained uncertain, and in many cases it was not until the 1990s that the original material was restudied to provide a definitive identification of the material. In a 2002 review of the fossil sigmodontine rodents of South America, Argentinean zoologist Ulyses Pardiñas and his coworkers wrote that O. anoblepas was "possibly an Oecomys", but this claim was based only on a cursory investigation.

In 2011, Pardiñas and Pablo Teta published another paper on "Calomys anoblepas" after re-examining the only known specimen in Copenhagen, and concluded that the animal was instead related to the living genus Juliomys, which currently includes three living species from southern Brazil and nearby Paraguay and Argentina. They recognized some features by which J. anoblepas differs from the living species, and consequently kept it as a distinct, extinct species. Juliomys is a genus of unclear relations within the subfamily Sigmodontinae, which is widespread and very diverse in South America and southern North America.

== Description ==
Juliomys anoblepas is known only from the front half of a skull, which was found in a cave known as "Lapa da Serra das Abelhas". Compared to other species of Juliomys, it is large and has a more robust skull and teeth. Its rostrum (the front part) is broad and short and the interorbital region (between the skull) is hourglass-shaped, with squared margins. The thomasomyine rodent Rhipidomys and the oryzomyine Oecomys, both of which also occur in eastern Brazil, both have a broader interorbital region with better-developed ridges at the margins. One of three living species of Juliomys, Juliomys pictipes, also has a broader interorbital region. Behind the position of the nasals (which are missing in the only known skull) is an interlacrymal depression, a lowered portion of the skull; the suture (connection) between the two frontal bones is incompletely closed there. This interfrontal fontanelle is shared with Juliomys rimofrons, but not with Juliomys pictipes, nor with most specimens of Juliomys ossitenuis. In Wilfredomys, a Brazilian rodent with some similarities to J. anoblepas, the premaxillary bone forms a narrow projection towards the frontals, which is absent in J. anoblepas and other Juliomys species.

The zygomatic plates are almost completely vertical. As Winge already noted, the front margin of the zygomatic plate hardly extends forward before the antorbital bridge, which connects the plate to the body of the skull. This feature distinguishes J. anoblepas from Wilfredomys and many oryzomyines, but the zygomatic plate of living Juliomys species closely resembles that of J. anoblepas. In addition, the connection between the zygomatic plate and the antorbital bridge is inserted higher on the rostrum in Wilfredomys. The zygomatic arches (cheekbones) spread broadly. More than in other Juliomys species, the front part of the zygomatic arches is bended forward and the zygomatic plates are bended outward. Furthermore, the zygomatic notch, the notch between the zygomatic plate and arch, is deep, not shallow as in J. ossitenuis and J. rimofrons.

The incisive foramina (openings in the palate between the incisors and the molars) are broad and long, extending to the front margins of the first upper molar (M1). Wilfredomys has even longer incisive foramina, extending between the molars, but the foramina are shorter in J. ossitenuis and J. pictipes. The palate itself is wide and short, with its back margin between the M3s. Oryzomyines like Oecomys and Oligoryzomys have longer palates, extending beyond the third molars. Fine openings (foramina) are present on the palate. The back margin of the palate is squared; J. anoblepas lacks a spine in the middle of the back margin, as is present in Rhipidomys. Wilfredomys has the back margin U-shaped instead and has a longer palate, with the back margin behind the M3s.

The well-developed upper incisors have orange enamel at their front surfaces and are slightly opisthodont (with their cutting edge behind the vertical plane of the incisors). The molars are brachyodont (low-crowned) and bear crests and cusps arranged in pairs opposite each other. The front cusp of M1, the anterocone, is divided into two smaller cusps on each side of the tooth by a valley, the anteromedian flexus. Both M1 and the second molar (M2) have a well-developed mesoloph (a crest near the middle of the tooth). Although M3 is relatively large, its back part is reduced.

The interorbital region is 4.14 mm long and the zygomatic plate is 2.38 mm. The diastema (gap) between the incisors and molars is 6.39 mm long. The incisive foramina are 5.25 mm long and 1.77 mm broad. The palatal bridge (the portion of the palate between the incisive foramina and the mesopterygoid fossa behind the back end of the palate) is 4.29 mm long and 2.75 mm broad at the first molars. The upper molar row is 4.13 mm long and M1 is 1.19 mm broad. These measurements make J. anoblepas the largest known species of Juliomys.

== Distribution and habitat ==
Juliomys anoblepas is known only from Lagoa Santa, where the genus no longer occurs; the nearest records are about 70 km (43.5 mi) to the southeast. It is one of several Lagoa Santa fossil rodents that no longer occur in the area. Although the precise environmental background of the Lagoa Santa fossil assemblage remains unclear, they may have been deposited in a period of climatic cooling that led to higher local diversity.

== Literature cited ==
- Hershkovitz, P. 1962. Evolution of Neotropical cricetine rodents (Muridae) with special reference to the phyllotine group. Fieldiana Zoology 46:1–524.
- Musser, G.G. and Carleton, M.D. 2005. Superfamily Muroidea. Pp. 894–1531 in Wilson, D.E. and Reeder, D.M. (eds.). Mammal Species of the World: a taxonomic and geographic reference. 3rd ed. Baltimore: The Johns Hopkins University Press, 2 vols., 2142 pp. ISBN 978-0-8018-8221-0
- Pardiñas, U.F.J., D'Elía, G. and Ortiz, P.E. 2002. Sigmodontinos fósiles (Rodentia, Muroidea, Sigmodontinae) de América del sur: Estado actual de su conocimiento y prospectiva. Mastozoología Neotropical 9(2):209–252 (in Spanish).
- Pardiñas, U.F.J. and Teta, P. 2011. On the taxonomic status of the Brazilian mouse Calomys anoblepas Winge, 1887 (Mammalia, Rodentia, Cricetidae). Zootaxa 2788:38–44.
- Trouessart, E.L. 1898. Catalogus mammalium tam viventium quam fossilium. Tomus 2. Berlin: R. Friedländer and Sohn, 1469 pp. (in Latin).
- Voss, R.S. and Myers, P. 1991. Pseudoryzomys simplex (Rodentia: Muridae) and the significance of Lund's collections from the caves of Lagoa Santa, Brazil. Bulletin of the American Museum of Natural History 206:414–432.
- Weksler, M. and Bonvicino, C.R. 2005. Taxonomy of pygmy rice rats genus Oligoryzomys Bangs, 1900 (Rodentia, Sigmodontinae) of the Brazilian Cerrado, with the description of two new species. Arquivos do Museu Nacional 63(1):113–130.
- Weksler, M., Percequillo, A.R. and Voss, R.S. 2006. Ten new genera of oryzomyine rodents (Cricetidae: Sigmodontinae). American Museum Novitates 3537:1–29.
- Winge, H. 1888. Jordfundne og nulevende Gnavere (Rodentia) fra Lagoa Santa, Minas Geraes, Brasilien. E Museo Lundii 1(3):1–200 (in Danish).
