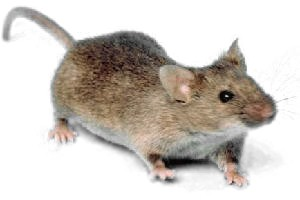
- Mus musculus

Scientific classification
- Kingdom: Animalia
- Phylum: Chordata
- Class: Mammalia
- Order: Rodentia
- Superfamily: Muroidea
- Clade: Eumuroida

Families
- Calomyscidae; Nesomyidae; Cricetidae; Muridae

= Eumuroida =

Clade of rodents

The Eumuroida are a clade defined in 2004 by Steppan et al. to describe a group of muroid rodents (mice, rats and relatives). The clade is not defined in the standard taxonomic hierarchy, but it is between superfamily and family.

The Eumuroida are technically defined as the clade including all organisms descended from the most recent common ancestor of the Calomyscidae, Nesomyidae, Cricetidae, and Muridae. It specifically excludes the fossorial forms of mouse-like rodents in the family Spalacidae. It has yet to be determined if the Platacanthomyidae belong to the Eumuroida, but Norris et al. (2004) suggested they do not because of subtle features in the skull.

Norris et al. (2004) noted that two characters can be used to define the Eumuroida: the infraorbital foramen is V-shaped and extends to the roof of the palate, and the incisive foramina are medium to large in size. The zygomatic plate is at least moderately developed in this group, producing the V shape. The common ancestors of the Eumuroida were probably not specialized as burrowing animals, whereas the spalacid ancestor may have been.

Jansa and Weksler (2004) noted that the Eumuroid ancestors likely had hamster-like (cricetid) molars as opposed to mouse-like molars (murid). Essentially, the occlusal surface of the molars probably had two rows of cusps (cricetid) instead of three (murid).

Early fossil muroids, such as cricetodontines, represent a possible ancestor to the Eumuroida. These rodents have cricetid teeth, hence the name: Neo-Latin cricetus 'hamster', Ancient Greek odóntes 'teeth'. The presence of these fossils in Eurasia is parsimonious, because most families of eumuroids (except the Nesomyidae) have representatives in Asia. Steppan et al. (2004) suggested the most recent common ancestor of the Eumuroida lived around the transition between the Oligocene and Miocene. This date only slightly precedes the first appearance of cricetodontines.

== Taxonomy ==
- Family Calomyscidae
  - Subfamily Calomyscinae (mouse-like hamsters)
- Family Nesomyidae
  - Subfamily Cricetomyinae (pouched rats and mice)
  - Subfamily Dendromurinae (African climbing mice, gerbil mice, fat mice and forest mice)
  - Subfamily Mystromyinae (white-tailed rat)
  - Subfamily Nesomyinae (Malagasy rats and mice)
  - Subfamily Petromyscinae (rock mice and the climbing swamp mouse)
- Family Cricetidae
  - Subfamily Arvicolinae (voles, lemmings and muskrat)
  - Subfamily Cricetinae (true hamsters)
  - Subfamily Neotominae (North American rats and mice)
  - Subfamily Sigmodontinae (New World rats and mice)
  - Subfamily Tylomyinae
- Family Muridae
  - Subfamily Deomyinae (spiny mice, brush furred mice, link rat)
  - Subfamily Gerbillinae (gerbils, jirds and sand rats)
  - Subfamily Lophiomyinae (crested rat)
  - Subfamily Murinae (Old World rats and mice including vlei rats)
