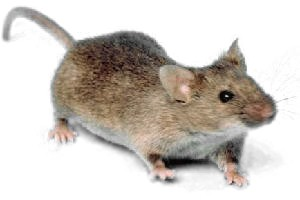
- Common house mouse (Mus musculus)

Scientific classification
- Kingdom: Animalia
- Phylum: Chordata
- Class: Mammalia
- Order: Rodentia
- Suborder: Myomorpha
- Superfamily: Muroidea; Illiger, 1811

Families
- Platacanthomyidae; Spalacidae; Calomyscidae; Nesomyidae; Cricetidae; Muridae sister: Dipodoidea

= Muroidea =

Muroidea Temporal range: Middle Eocene – recent

Superfamily of rodents

The Muroidea are a large superfamily of rodents, including mice, rats, voles, hamsters, lemmings, gerbils, and many other relatives. Although the Muroidea originated in Eurasia, they occupy a vast variety of habitats on every continent except Antarctica. Some authorities have placed all members of this group into a single family, Muridae, due to difficulties in determining how the subfamilies are related to one another. Many of the families within the Muroidea superfamily have more variations between the families than between the different clades. A possible explanation for the variations in rodents is because of the location of these rodents; these changes could have been due to radiation or the overall environment they migrated to or originated in. The following taxonomy is based on recent well-supported molecular phylogenies.

The muroids are classified in six families, 19 subfamilies, around 280 genera, and at least 1,750 species.

== Taxonomy ==
- Family Platacanthomyidae (spiny dormouse and pygmy dormice)
- Family Spalacidae (fossorial muroids)
  - Subfamily Myospalacinae (zokors)
  - Subfamily Rhizomyinae (bamboo rats and root rats)
  - Subfamily Spalacinae (blind mole rats)
- Clade Eumuroida – typical muroids
  - Family Calomyscidae
    - Subfamily Calomyscinae (mouse-like hamsters)
  - Family Nesomyidae
    - Subfamily Cricetomyinae (pouched rats and mice)
    - Subfamily Dendromurinae (African climbing mice, gerbil mice, fat mice and forest mice)
    - Subfamily Mystromyinae (white-tailed rat)
    - Subfamily Nesomyinae (Malagasy rats and mice)
    - Subfamily Petromyscinae (rock mice and the climbing swamp mouse)
  - Family Cricetidae
    - Subfamily Arvicolinae (voles, lemmings and muskrat)
    - Subfamily Cricetinae (true hamsters)
    - Subfamily Neotominae (North American rats and mice)
    - Subfamily Sigmodontinae (New World rats and mice)
    - Subfamily Tylomyinae (vesper rats and climbing rats)
  - Family Muridae
    - Subfamily Deomyinae (spiny mice, brush-furred mice, link rat)
    - Subfamily Gerbillinae (gerbils, jirds and sand rats)
    - Subfamily Leimacomyinae (Togo mouse)
    - Subfamily Lophiomyinae (crested rat)
    - Subfamily Murinae (Old World rats and mice, including vlei rats)

== Phylogeny ==
Five main clades are recognized by Jansa & Weksler (2004).

- Family Spalacidae: Spalacinae, Myospalacinae, and Rhizomyinae (fossorial species of the Old World)
- Family Calomyscidae: Calomyscinae (Asia)
- Family Nesomyidae: Petromyscinae, Mystromyinae, Cricetomyinae, Nesomyinae, and core dendromurines (Africa and Madagascar)
- Family Muridae: Murinae, Otomyinae, Gerbillinae, Acomyinae, and Lophiomyinae (Old World)
- Family Cricetidae: Sigmodontinae, Arvicolinae, and Cricetinae (New World)

Together, Muroidea and its sister group Dipodoidea form the suborder Myomorpha.

The following phylogeny of more than 70 Muroidea genera, based on molecular phylogenetic analysis of the Interphotoreceptor Retinoid Binding Protein (IRBP) gene, is from Jansa & Weksler (2004: 264). Although Platacanthomyidae was not analyzed by Jansa & Weksler (2004), a study by Fabre et al. 2012 suggests that it is sister to the remaining groups within Muroidea.

- Muroidea
  - Platacanthomyidae
  - - Spalacidae
      - - Spalacinae
          Spalax
      - - Myospalacinae
          Myospalax
        - Rhizomyinae
          - Tachyoryctes
          - Rhizomys
    - Eumuroida
      - - Calomyscidae
          Calomyscus
      - - - Nesomyidae
            - - Hypogeomys
              - - Nesomys
                - Brachyuromys
            - - - Monticolomys
                - Macrotarsomys
              - - Brachytarsomys
                - - Gymnuromys
                  - - Voalavo
                    - Eliurus
            - - - Petromyscinae
                  Petromyscus
                - Mystromyinae
                  Mystromys
              - - - Cricetomys
                  - Beamys
                - - Saccostomus
                  - - Steatomys
                    - Dendromus
          - Muridae
            - - - Lophiomyinae
                  Lophiomys
              - - Gerbillinae
                  - Tatera
                  - Meriones
                - Acomyinae
                  - Lophuromys
                  - - Deomys
                    - Acomys
            - Murinae
              - Phloeomys
              - - - Micromys
                  - - Maxomys
                    - - Niviventer
                      - - Sundamys
                        - Rattus
                - - Rhynchomys
                  - - Otomys
                    - - Aethomys
                      - - Rhabdomys
                        - Grammomys
                  - - Tokudaia
                    - - Mus
                      - - Mastomys
                        - - Praomys
                          - Hylomyscus
        - - Cricetidae
            - - Cricetinae
                - Cricetulus
                - - Phodopus
                  - Mesocricetus
            - - - Tylomyinae
                  - Tylomys
                  - Nyctomys
                - Neotominae
                  - Neotoma
                  - - Scotinomys
                    - Peromyscus
              - - Arvicolinae
                  - Microtus
                  - - Eothenomys
                    - Clethrionomys
                - Sigmodontinae
                  - - Sigmodon
                    - Rheomys
                  - - - Scapteromys
                      - Akodon
                    - - Reithrodon
                      - - Thomasomys
                        - Rhipidomys
                    - - Zygodontomys
                      - Scolomys
                      - - Oryzomys
                        - - Oligoryzomys
                          - Nectomys
                    - - - Delomys
                        - - Phyllotis
                          - Calomys
                    - - - Juliomys
                        - Irenomys
                      - - Wiedomys
                        - - Notiomys
                          - Abrothrix
