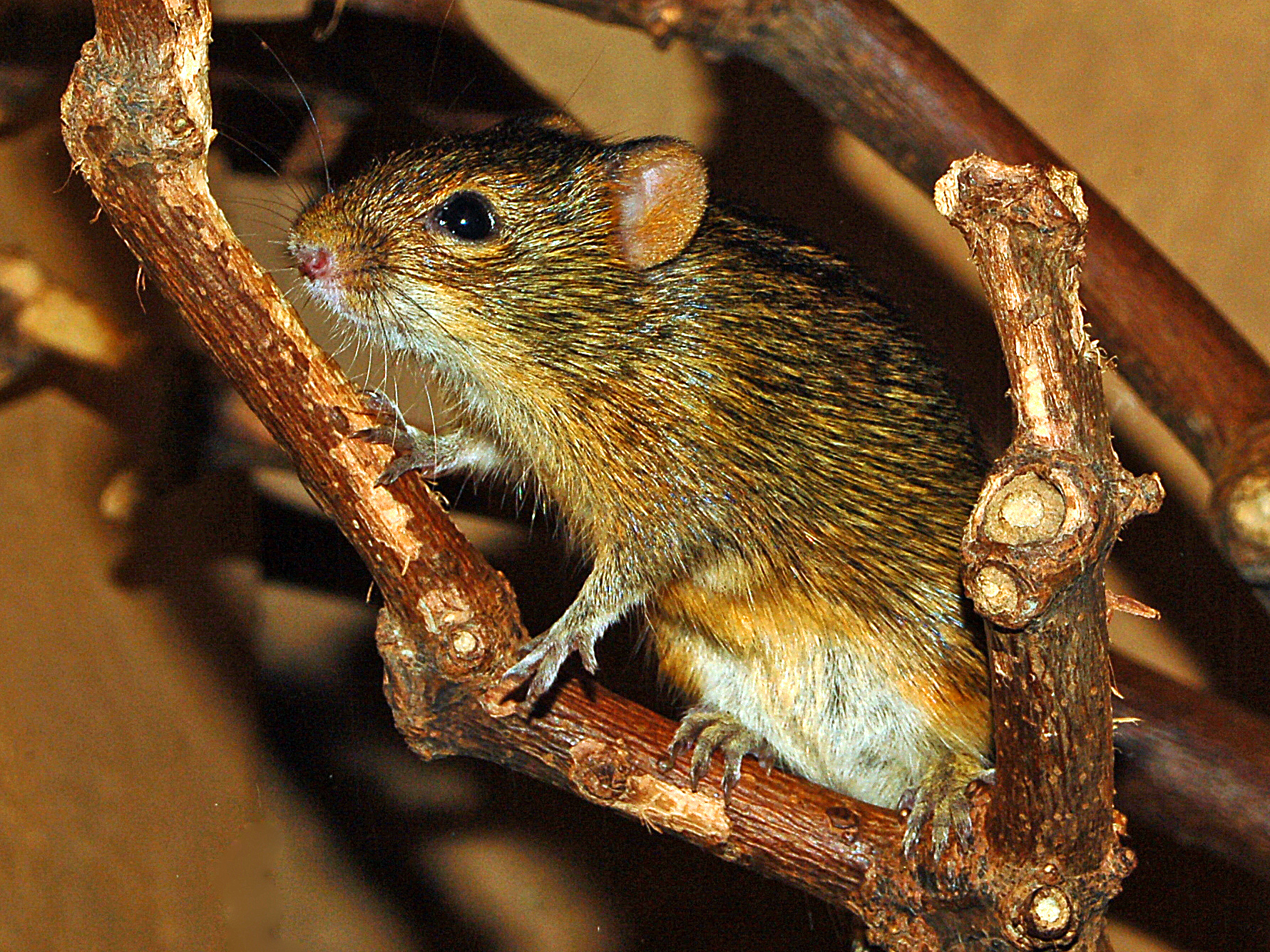
- At the Prague Zoo

Conservation status
- Least Concern (IUCN 3.1)

Scientific classification
- Kingdom: Animalia
- Phylum: Chordata
- Class: Mammalia
- Order: Rodentia
- Family: Muridae
- Genus: Rhabdomys
- Species: R. dilectus

Binomial name
- Rhabdomys dilectus de Winton, 1897

Synonyms
- Rhabdomys algoae Roberts, 1946; Rhabdomys angolae (Wroughton, 1905); Rhabdomys bethuliensis Roberts, 1946; Rhabdomys chakae (Wroughton, 1905); Rhabdomys cradockensis Roberts, 1946; Rhabdomys diminutus (Thomas, 1893); Rhabdomys griquoides Roberts, 1946; Rhabdomys moshesh (Wroughton, 1905); Rhabdomys nyasae (Wroughton, 1905); Rhabdomys vaalensis Roberts, 1946

= Rhabdomys dilectus =

Mesic four-striped grass rat

Southern African species of mammals belonging to the mouse and rat family of rodents

Rhabdomys dilectus, the mesic four-striped grass rat, is a species of rodent in the family Muridae.

== Taxonomy ==
Traditionally the genus Rhabdomys has been seen as a single species, Rhabdomys pumilio, though modern evidence on the basis of karyotype and mtDNA analysis suggests that it comprises a second species, Rhabdomys dilectus .

R. dilectus is divided in the following subspecies.

- R.d.dilectus (karyotypic form 2n = 46): Lesotho, South African province of KwaZulu-Natal, and eastern Zimbabwe;
- R.d.angolae (Wroughton, 1905): central and southern Angola;
- R.d.diminutus (Thomas, 1893): central and western Kenya, central-eastern Uganda, highlands of central-northern Tanzania, south-east Democratic Republic of Congo, northern Malawi;

== Description ==
Rhabdomys dilectus is a fairly typical smallish murid, rather larger than house mice. Head+body length is between 90 and 135 mm, the length of the tail between 80 and 135 mm, the length of the foot between 17 and 33 mm, the length of the ears between 10.0 and 20 mm and the weight up to 68 g.

The back is dark reddish-brown and displays characteristic black longitudinal stripes. The stripes inspired the generic name, which is derived from the Greek rhabdos meaning rod, giving Rhabdomys, meaning something like "barred mouse". The ventral sides are lighter. The legs are dark grizzled. The tail is shorter than the head and body. It is a terrestrial species, crepuscular and solitary. It feeds mainly on seeds of wheat and partly on plants, berries and small invertebrates. It is considered a plague by farmers.

== Distribution ==
It is found throughout southern Africa.

== Habitat ==
Rhabdomys dilectus lives in the wetter mountain savannas up to 2,300 meters above sea level. It often invades cultivated fields. In urban areas it may enter houses.
