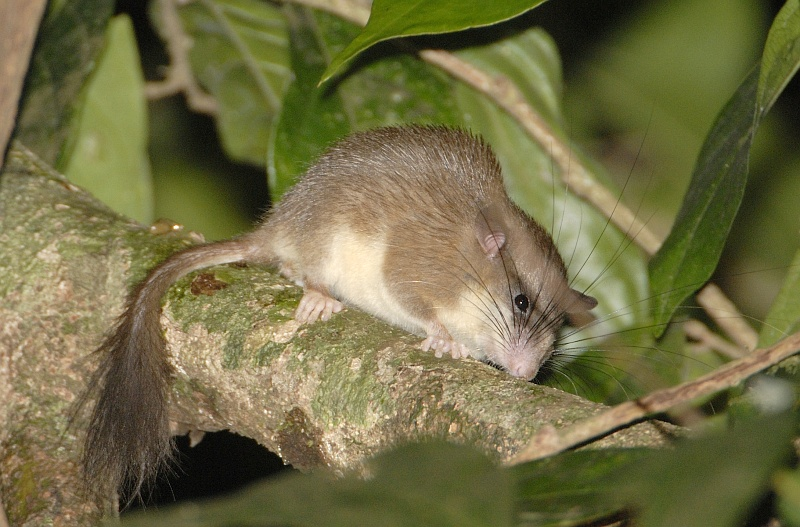

Conservation status
- Vulnerable (IUCN 3.1)

Scientific classification
- Kingdom: Animalia
- Phylum: Chordata
- Class: Mammalia
- Order: Rodentia
- Family: Platacanthomyidae
- Genus: Platacanthomys; Blyth, 1859
- Species: P. lasiurus

Binomial name
- Platacanthomys lasiurus Blyth, 1859
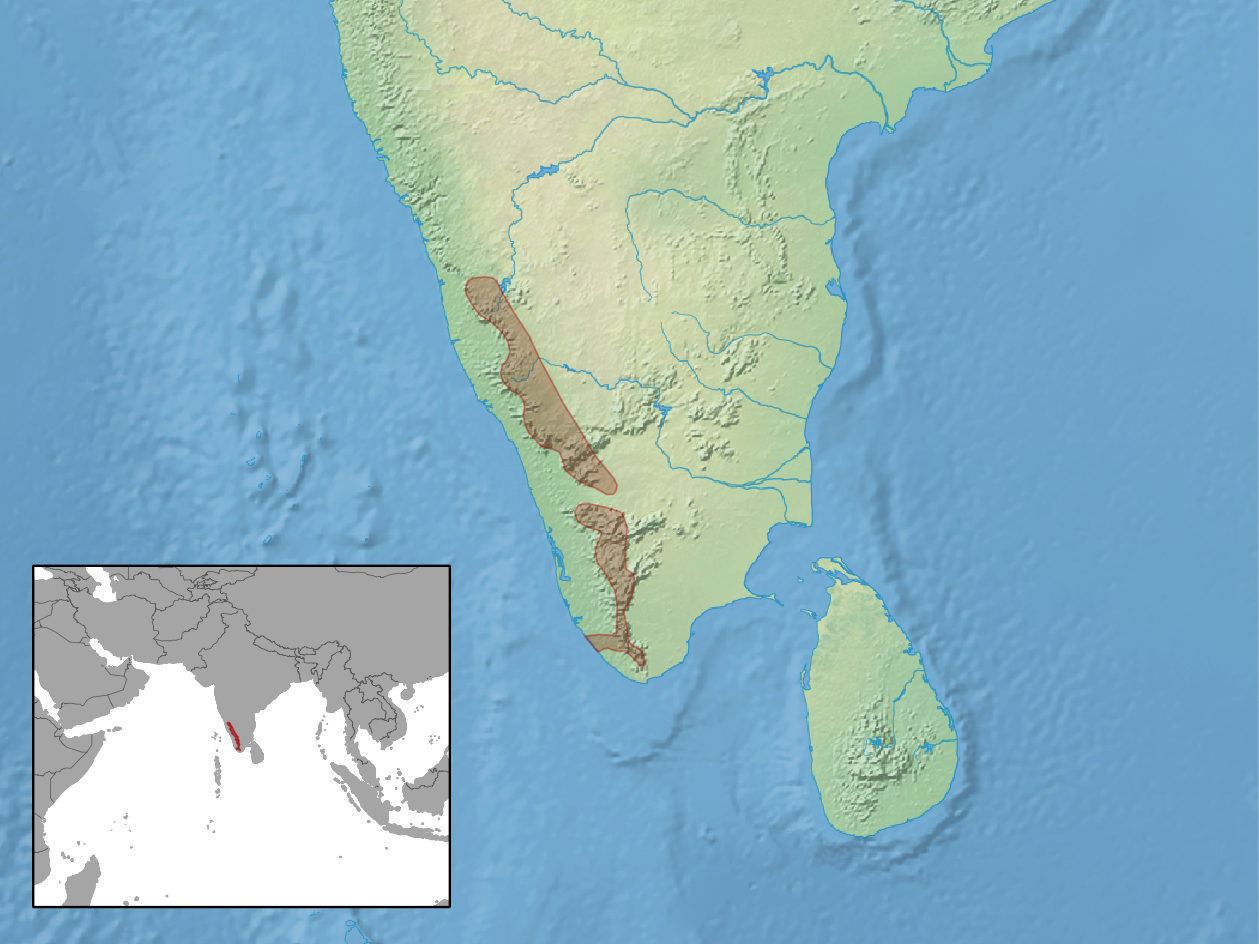

= Malabar spiny dormouse =

Malabar spiny dormouse Temporal range: Late Miocene to Recent

Species of rodent

The Malabar spiny dormouse (Platacanthomys lasiurus) is a species of muroid rodent endemic to the Western Ghats of India. It is the only extant species in the genus Platacanthomys and although resembling a dormouse, it is not closely related. About the size of a brown rat, this arboreal species lives in tree holes in dense forest habitats in a small family group. They are distinguishable from other species in the area by their bushy tuft tip to the tail and the spiny fur on the back.

== Description ==
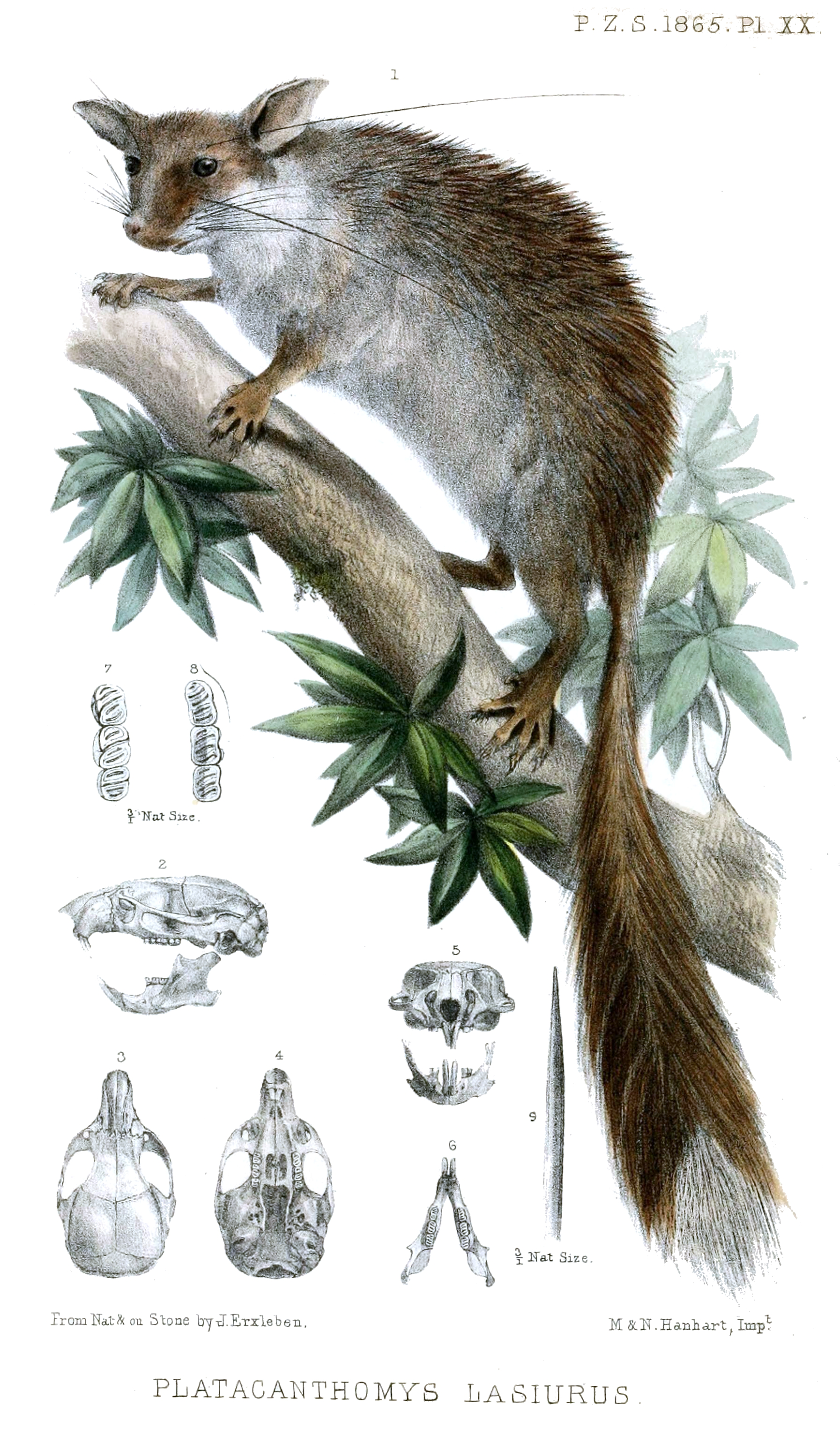
Illustration (1865)

This rodent is about 5 in (130 mm) long with a 4 in (100 mm) tail. The ears are large and pointed at the tip. The whiskers are numerous and some are very long. The hairy tail is covered with longer hairs towards the end, making the tail wider at the tip. The hairs arise on the sides towards the base of the tail (an arrangement termed as "subdistichous") giving the tail a slightly flattened appearance. The pollux ("thumb") and hallux ("big toe") are without claws. The skull is broad and flat above and the infraorbital foramen is large. They are brownish above and whitish below with a distinct border. The feet are whitish. The tip of the tail is sometimes whitish, but is otherwise like the colour of the back. The fur on the back has scattered broad and flat spiny hairs with white tips. Finer spines are also found on the fur of the underside.

== Taxonomy and systematics ==
The genus name is derived from the flattened (platy-) spines (Greek acantha), while mus refers to a mouse. The species name lasiurus is based on the Greek lasios for hairy and —oura for tail.

The position of this species has been puzzled on from very early times. In 1860, Sclater exhibited a specimen noting it as a new dormouse from the Malabar. As early as 1865, this position was disputed on the basis of the dental formula. Peters (1865) suggested that the species was unrelated to the dormice and suggested that they should be placed with the murine genera of India. This position in the family Muridae was used in The Fauna of British India (1891). Palmer (1897) placed the subfamily Platacanthomyinae within the Gliridae. but Ellerman (1940) placed the genus in the subfamily Platacanthomyinae under the family Muscardinidae. Nowak (1999) places the subfamily within the Muridae and includes the genus Typhlomys in this subfamily. The exact phylogenetic relations of Platacanthomys have not been examined using sequence based approaches although Typhlomys has been confirmed to belong within the Muroid clade.

A fossil from the late Miocene (about 9 Mya) of China has been described as Platacanthomys dianensis.

== Distribution ==
The species is found only in the denser forest regions of the Western Ghats and the Nilgiri hills. They are found in altitudes up to 2,000 m (6,600 ft) (such as at Ootacamund and Coonoor) and are found at very low densities. The northernmost record is from Sagar in Shimoga district of Karnataka. Records are few and scattered and published records are from Aralam, Coorg, Peppara and Karianshola.

The species was however considered to be common when it was first discovered by Reverend H. Baker (from Mundakyam, Allepey). He obtained the first specimens for Edward Blyth and noted that they lived in hole nests in large trees and that they were considered a minor pest of fruit trees and in cardamom and pepper plantations.

== Behaviour and ecology ==
The species is nocturnal and is largely frugivorous. A specimen in captivity fed voraciously on a diet of fruits. When sleeping, it curls its body, hedgehog-like, with its tail protruding. The species is believed to feed on pepper in plantations, but trapping surveys suggest they are mainly restricted to undisturbed forest habitats.

Four young have been noted in one litter.

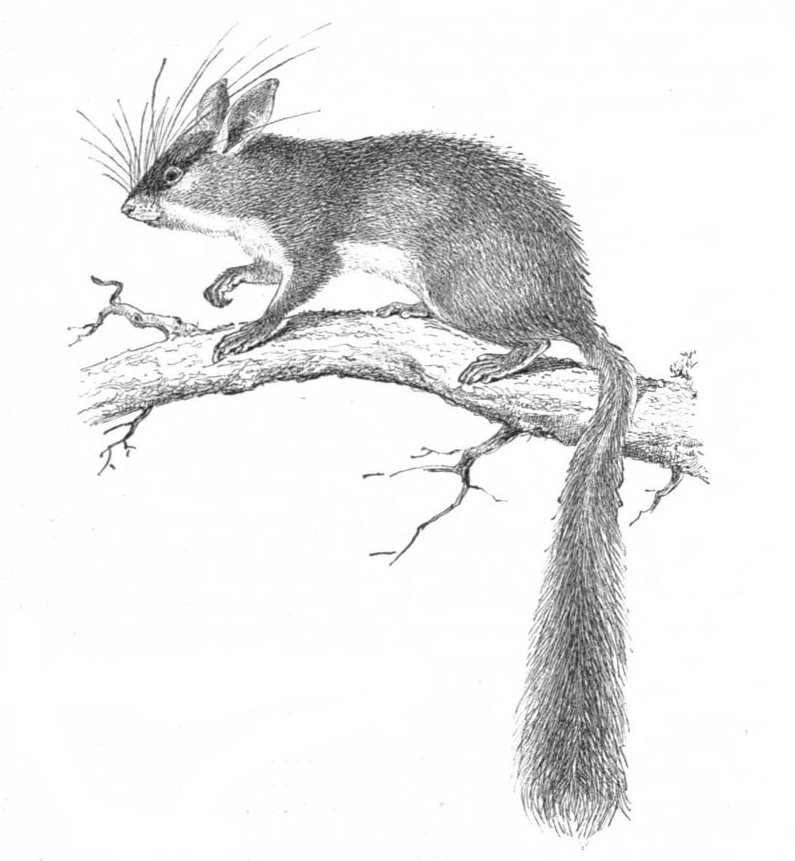
Illustration showing the distinctive bushy tail

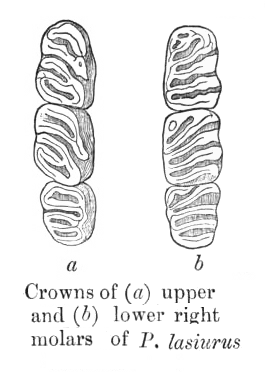
Detail of the molar teeth surface

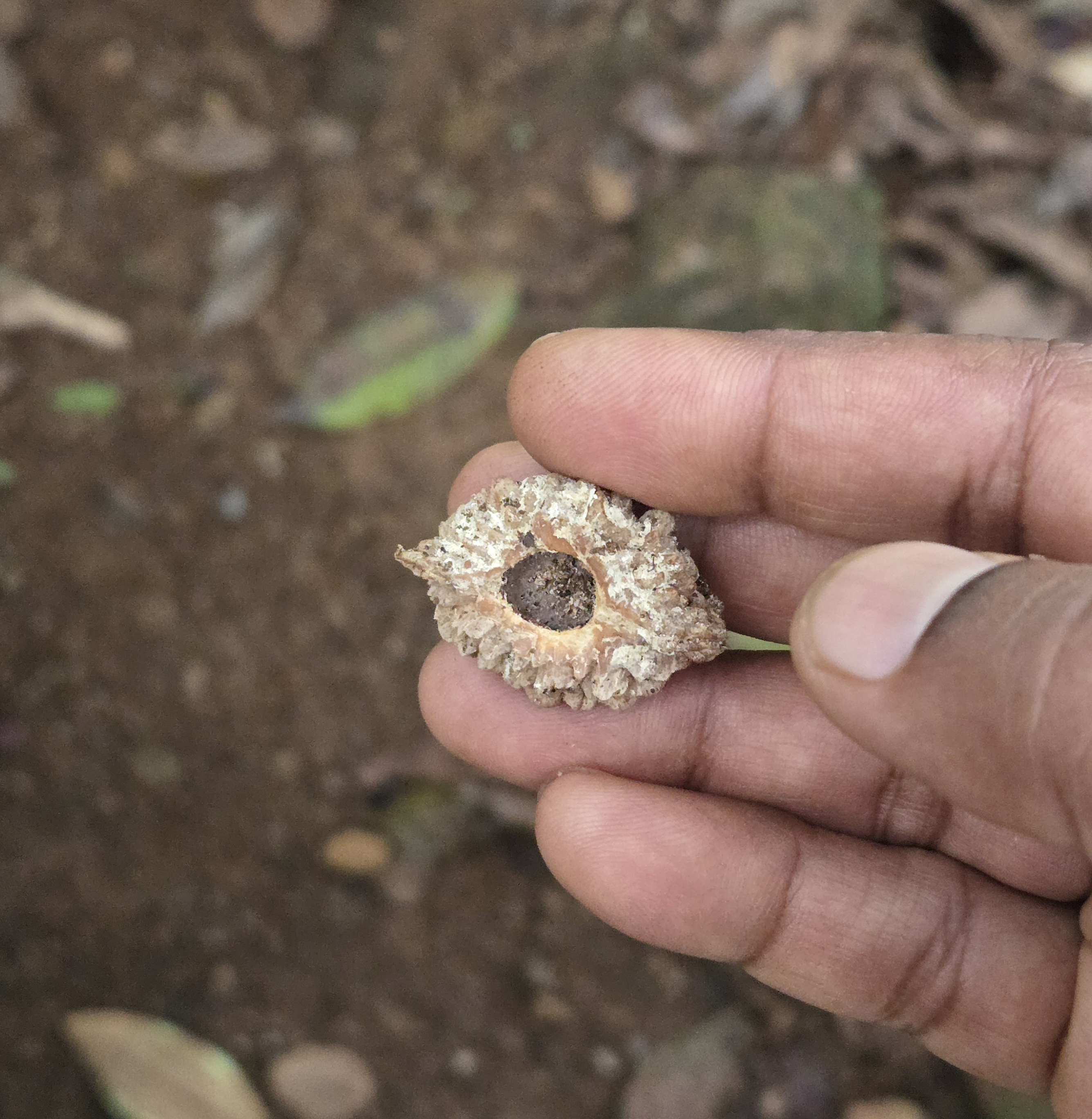
Dormouse feeding signs on Elaeocarpus tuberculatus
