= Chapa pygmy dormouse =

Conservation status
- Critically Endangered (IUCN 2.3)

Scientific classification
- Kingdom: Animalia
- Phylum: Chordata
- Class: Mammalia
- Order: Rodentia
- Family: Platacanthomyidae
- Genus: Typhlomys
- Species: T. cinereus
- Subspecies: T. c. chapensis

Trinomial name
- Typhlomys cinereus chapensis Osgood, 1932

Subspecies of rodent

The Chapa pygmy dormouse or Vietnamese pygmy dormouse (Typhlomys cinereus chapensis) is a rodent endemic to Vietnam; this nocturnal creature is 7-10 cm long (3-4 in), with a tail of 10-13 cm (4-5 in) and long ears.

In 2014, it was mainly found to the west of the Red River, in north Vietnam and southern Yunan Province in China.

It was previously seen as a subspecies of the Chinese pygmy dormouse (T. cinereus), along with T. ci daloushanensis, T. ci. Guangxiensis and T. ci. Jingdongensis. In 2014, it was confirmed by Abramov et al as an individual species and separate from T. cinereus.

At the start of the 21st century, it was listed as a critically endangered species. By 2017, the status of the general T. cinereus was as a creature of 'least concern', however the current population trend is decreasing.
