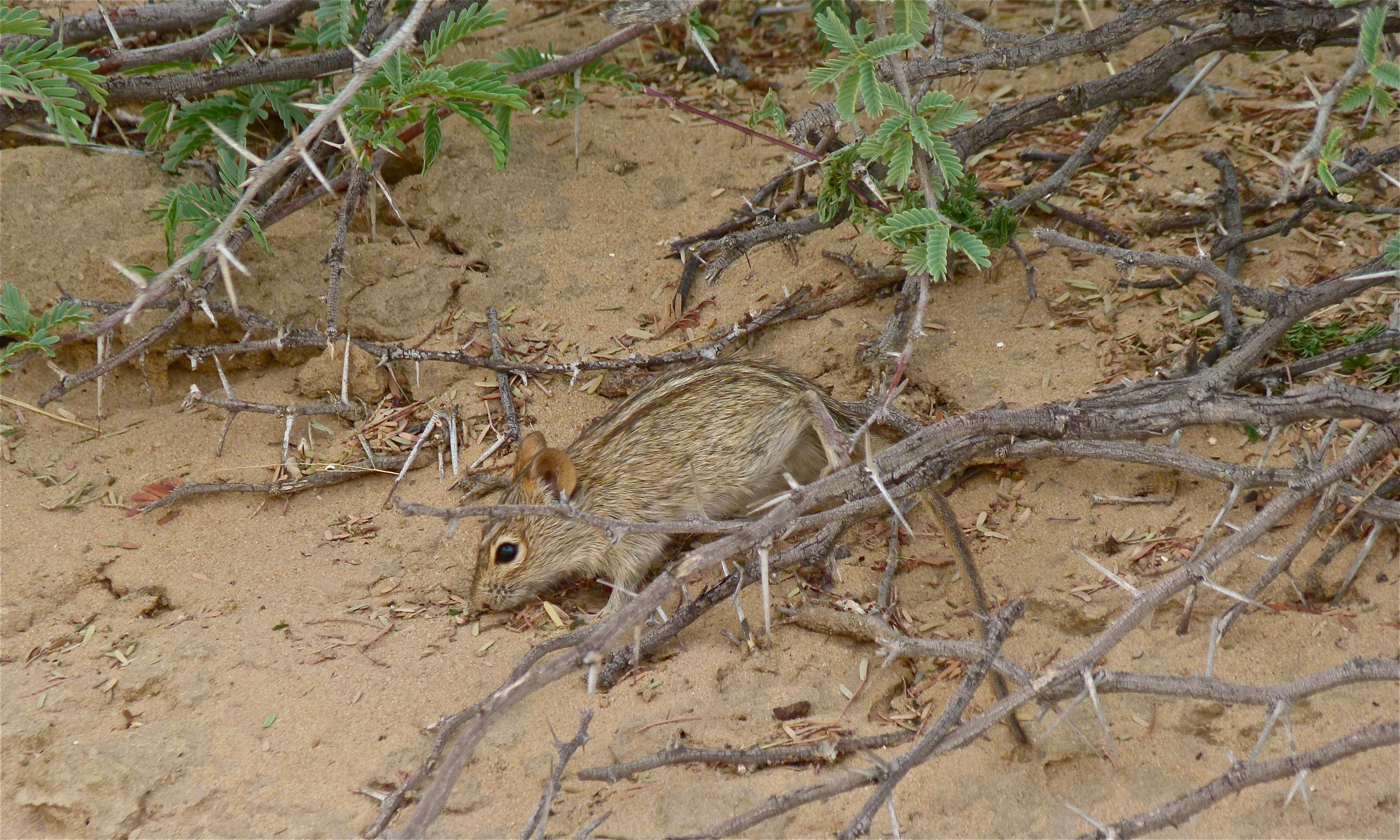
- Rhabdomys pumilio

Scientific classification
- Domain: Eukaryota
- Kingdom: Animalia
- Phylum: Chordata
- Class: Mammalia
- Order: Rodentia
- Family: Muridae
- Tribe: Arvicanthini
- Genus: Rhabdomys; Thomas, 1916

Type species
- Mus pumilio

Species
- Rhabdomys dilectus Rhabdomys pumilio

= Rhabdomys =

Rhabdomys Temporal range: Late Pliocene to Recent

Southern African genus of mammals belonging to the mouse and rat family of rodents

Rhabdomys is a largely Southern African genus of muroid rodents slightly larger than house mice. They are known variously as striped or four-striped mice or rats. Traditionally the genus has been seen as a single species, Rhabdomys pumilio, though modern evidence on the basis of karyotype and mtDNA analysis suggests that it comprises two or more species and subspecies. Dorsally Rhabdomys species display four characteristic black longitudinal stripes on a paler background.

== Appearance and distribution ==
Dorsally Rhabdomys species display four black longitudinal stripes on a paler background, and accordingly authors sometimes describe it as having seven stripes. In any event Rhabdomys species as a group are unmistakable because no similarly sized Southern African rodents are similarly marked. Their stripes inspired the generic name, which is derived from the Greek rhabdos meaning rod; hence Rhabdomys, meaning something like "barred mouse".

Physically they are fairly typical smallish Murids, rather larger than house mice, and with more of a "Roman nose". Head+body length is about 105mm, and the same for the tail. A large male might have a mass of 55 grams.

Ignoring distinctions between species, Rhabdomys as a genus is widespread and abundant in the Southern African subregion. A few areas apparently do not support a population, but for the most part they occur rather patchily all the way from the southernmost Western Cape to northern Namibia and parts of Botswana, Mozambique, and Zimbabwe. It also has been recorded from parts of Angola, Zambia, Malawi, Tanzania, Kenya, Uganda and southern Congo.

== Ecology and general behaviour ==
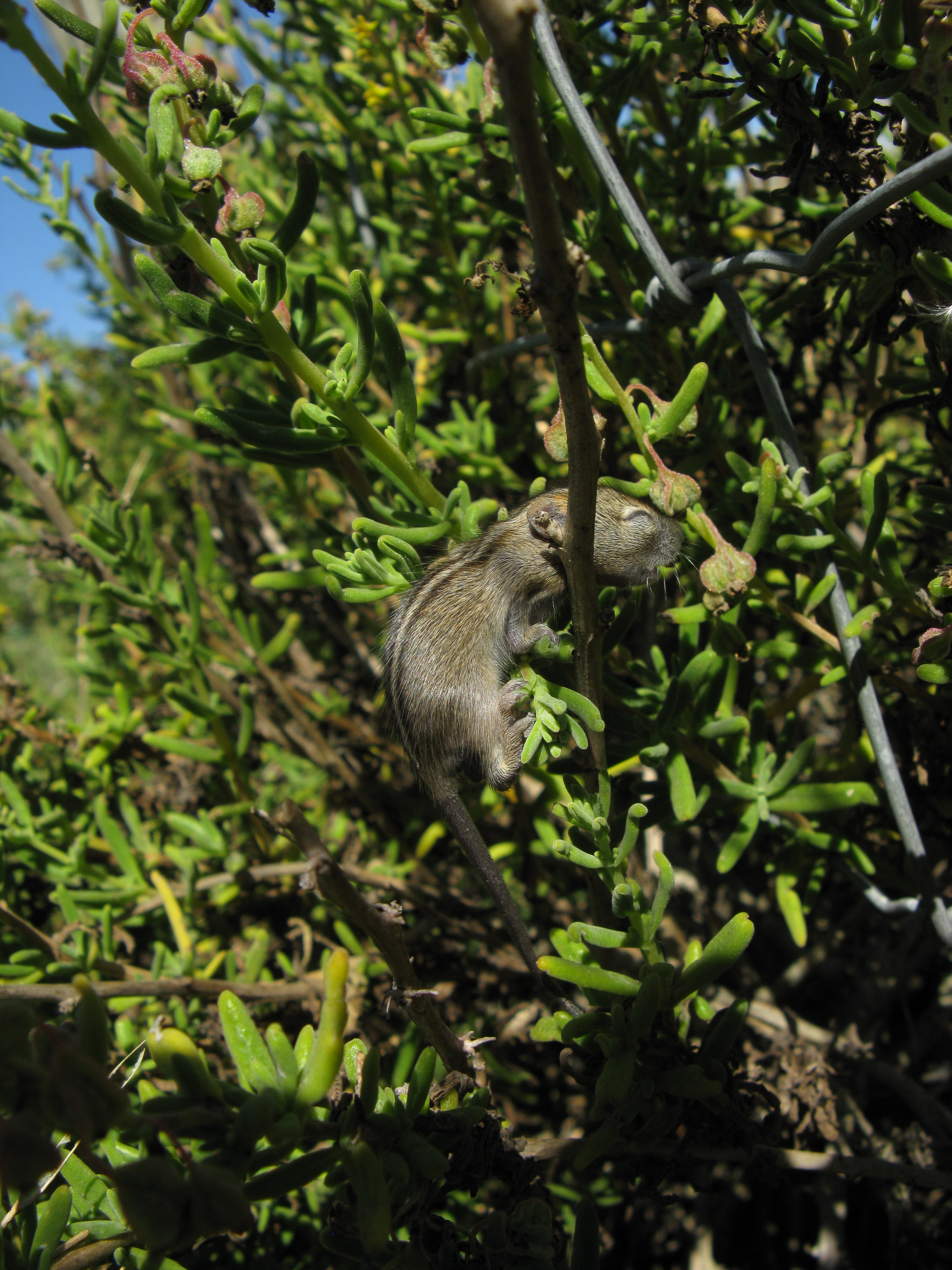
Unweaned Rhabdomys feeding on a succulent forb

Unlike most small rodents, Rhabdomys species exhibit a diurnal, bimodal activity pattern, with activity concentrated around crepuscular periods in mornings and evenings, and reduced during the midday period.

The omnivorous diet, the ability to survive without water provided that the food has a minimum water content of 15%, and its extreme plasticity in habitat preference are likely reasons for its wide (if discontinuous; Brooks, 1982) distribution throughout Southern Africa.

Rhabdomys are fairly omnivorous and will eat some kinds of insects opportunistically, but their main foods are seeds and other vegetable matter such as certain forbs. They will also eat the underground storage organs of certain small species of geophytes, such as edible Moraeas, which they can locate by smell and dig up. Though they are by no means generally regarded as serious pests, their depredations can be unwelcome to grain farmers and horticulturists when their population happens to be high.

Rhabdomys are important prey items for many species of snake, and for small to medium-sized carnivores such as the caracal, serval, wildcat and black-footed cat, jackal, and several species of mongoose. They also are major food items for several species of birds of prey. Even owls take advantage when they catch the mice in crepuscular activity.

== Breeding ==
Rhabdomys is a seasonal breeder and reproductively active from spring to autumn. After a gestation period of 22–23 days, free-living females give birth to approximately five pups; captive females have slightly larger litters (e.g. 7.2 ±1.8). Pups begin to consume solid food at ten days, leave the nest from twelve days, and weaning occurs at around 16 days. Sexual maturity is reached at approximately five to six weeks (range 34 – 90 days). Timing of sexual maturity, as well as dispersal age, depends on environmental factors (e.g. resource availability), social cues (e.g. the presence of older, reproductively active animals), as well as the animal's developmental history (e.g. weight at weaning; sex-ratio of litter). Females have an inter-litter interval of approximately 23–30 days.

== Social structure ==
Rhabdomys has a flexible social organisation and mating system that appears to be shaped primarily by resource (particularly food and cover) availability and, secondarily, by population density. In arid habitats (e.g. Namib; Kalahari; succulent karoo Rhabdomys can be described as a territorial, group-living, solitary forager that displays biparental care. In mesic, grassland habitats (e.g. Kwa-Zulu Natal Midlands; Pretoria Highveld; Zimbabwe grassland; and semi-succulent thorny scrub (e.g. Eastern Cape) animals are solitary, with females rearing their litters on their own, and both sexes maintain territories that overlap the territories of the opposite, but not the same, sex. However, males from both mesic and xeric populations display parental care in captivity, suggesting a plesiomorphic occurrence in the mesic populations, since the desert-living form represents the ancestral form.

== Morphology ==
There is some regional variation in morphology. Striped mice from the southwestern regions of southern Africa are slightly larger than animals from the more northern regions, and animals from the xeric western areas have a paler coat than do mice from the mesic, eastern regions. In addition, there appear to be population level differences in personality – an animal's characteristic and consistent style of behaviour – and stress-sensitivity, although these differences have yet to be investigated empirically.

== Karyotypic forms ==
Two karyotypic forms of Rhabdomys (2n = 28 and 2n = 46) have been detected. Based on this finding and on the analysis of mitochondrial DNA, as well as evidence of divergent behavioural repertoires among populations (e.g. courtship behaviours). It has initially been suggested that R. pumilio be reclassified as two species: R. pumilio (the social form that occurs in xeric habitats; 2n = 48) and R. dilectus (the solitary form, found in mesic areas, that comprises two subspecies R. d. dilectus, 2n = 46, and R. d. chakae, 2n = 48). More recent mtDNA and nuclear DNA analyses support the existence of at least four distinct species, "R. pumilio" confined to the south western coastal parts of South Africa, "R intermedius" confined mostly to the higher altitudes of the arid western part of South Africa (above the Great Escarpment), "R. bechuanae" confined mostly to the western regions of South Africa and Namibia above the Orange river and "R. dilectus" confined to the mesic east of southern Africa).
