= Typhlomys nanus =

Typhlomys nanus Temporal range: Late Miocene - recent

Scientific classification
- Kingdom: Animalia
- Phylum: Chordata
- Class: Mammalia
- Infraclass: Placentalia
- Order: Rodentia
- Family: Platacanthomyidae
- Genus: Typhlomys
- Species: T. nanus

Binomial name
- Typhlomys nanus Cheng, He, Chen, Zhang, Wan, Li, Zhang & Jiang, 2017

Species of rodent

Typhlomys nanus, also known as the dwarf tree mouse, is a species of rodent of the family Platacanthomyidae found in eastern and north-eastern Yunnan, China, at middle to high elevations (2,000-3,000+ meters). The species was discovered in 2017 by Cheng et al. (2017) based on populations previously attributed to the Chinese pygmy dormouse.

== Description ==
The Dwarf Tree Mouse is considered to be the smallest known species within the genus Typhlomys. Its skull size has been measured to be larger than that of its counterpart T. daloushanensis, with its cranial length reportedly being 22.5 mm and its cranial width being 17.5 mm. It also has a more flattened skull than other members of its genus. The molar length and molar width of the Dwarf Tree Mouse are 4.5 mm and 3.5 mm, respectively. Another distinguishing characteristic of the Dwarf Tree Mouse is its lack of a posterofossettid in the M1 (first molar).
