= Wilfred's Mouse =

Wilfred's Mouse (in honor of Wilfred Hudson Osgood) may refer to several southern Brazilian and Argentine rodents:

- Wilfredomys oenax, known as "Wilfred's Mouse" or the "Greater Wilfred's Mouse"
- Juliomys pictipes (formerly Wilfredomys pictipes), known as the "Lesser Wilfred's Mouse"
