= Juliomys rimofrons =

Conservation status
- Near Threatened (IUCN 3.1)

Scientific classification
- Kingdom: Animalia
- Phylum: Chordata
- Class: Mammalia
- Order: Rodentia
- Family: Cricetidae
- Subfamily: Sigmodontinae
- Genus: Juliomys
- Species: J. rimofrons

Binomial name
- Juliomys rimofrons Oliveira and Bonvicino, 2002

Species of rodent

Juliomys rimofrons, also known as the cleft-headed juliomys, is a South American rodent species in the family Cricetidae. It is found in southern Brazil. The species is arboreal and lives in montane forests. It is threatened because of the small size and fragmentation of its current range. It's karyotype has 2n = 20, FN = 34.
