= Juliomys ossitenuis =

Scientific classification
- Kingdom: Animalia
- Phylum: Chordata
- Class: Mammalia
- Order: Rodentia
- Family: Cricetidae
- Subfamily: Sigmodontinae
- Genus: Juliomys
- Species: J. ossitenuis

Binomial name
- Juliomys ossitenuis Costa, Pavan, Leite, & Fagundes, 2007

Species of rodent

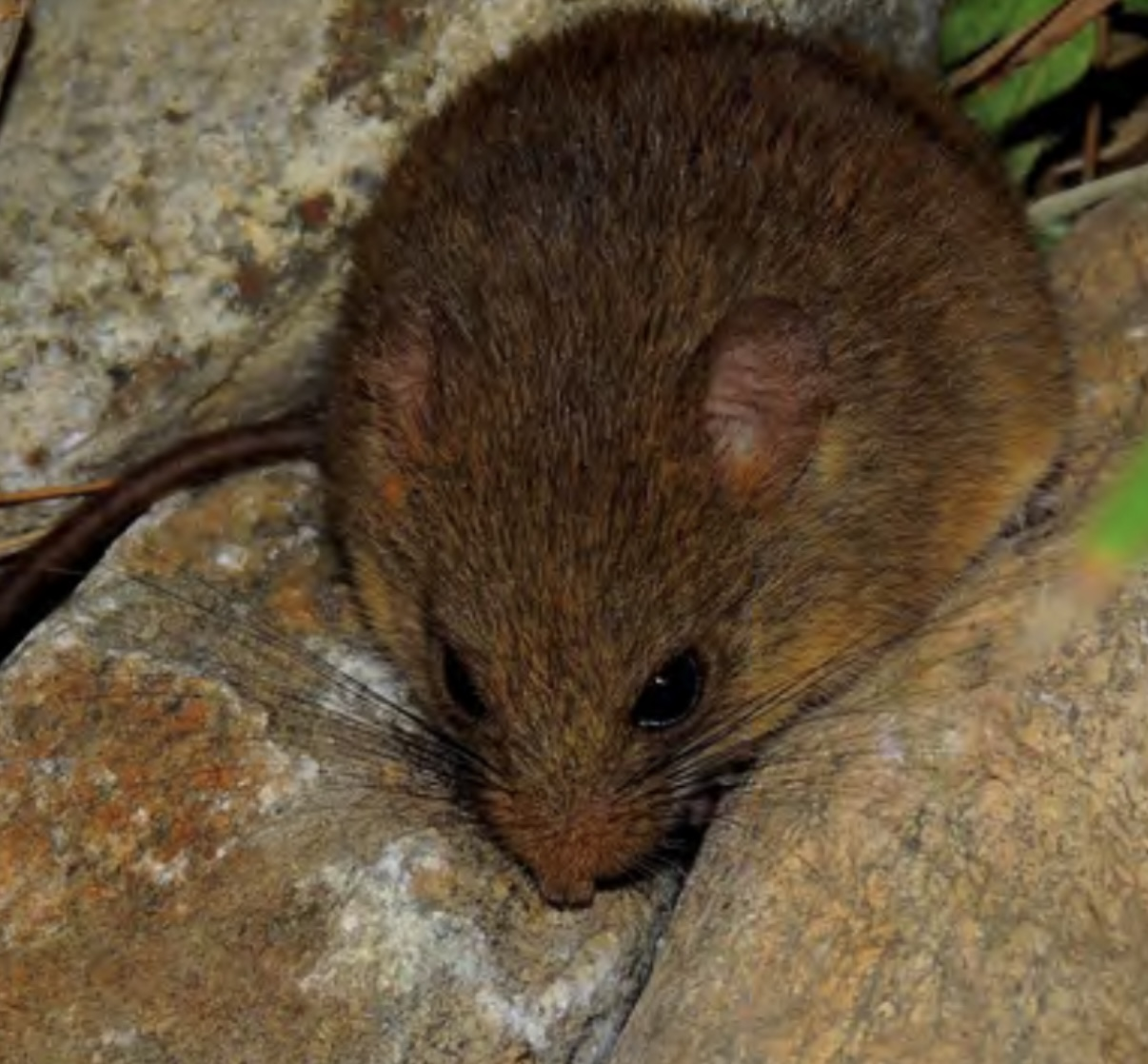
Juliomys ossitenuis

Juliomys ossitenuis is a species of rodent in the family Cricetidae native to South America.

== Taxonomy ==
This rodent is in the Kingdom Animalia. They are found in the Phylum Chordata, Class Mammalia, and Order Rodentia. Its specific epithet is named Juliomys ossitenuis. They belong to the Family Cricetidae and Subfamily Sigmodontinae.

== Habitat ==
They can survive in habitats that accumulate heavy amounts of rain.

== Biology ==
Three types of hair are present in the dorsal region of this species' fur: aristiform, setiform and villiform. The ventral coat is maize yellow, paws in dorsal view are light orange (apricot yellow and dark orange), tail is smooth and intensely bi-colored dorsoventrally, presence and absence of tufts of hair at the tip of the tail, and ventral coat banding pattern, with a gray base corresponding to approximately half and one third of the coat length.

=== Karyotype ===
The karyotypes of this rodent is 2n = 20 and NA = 36.
