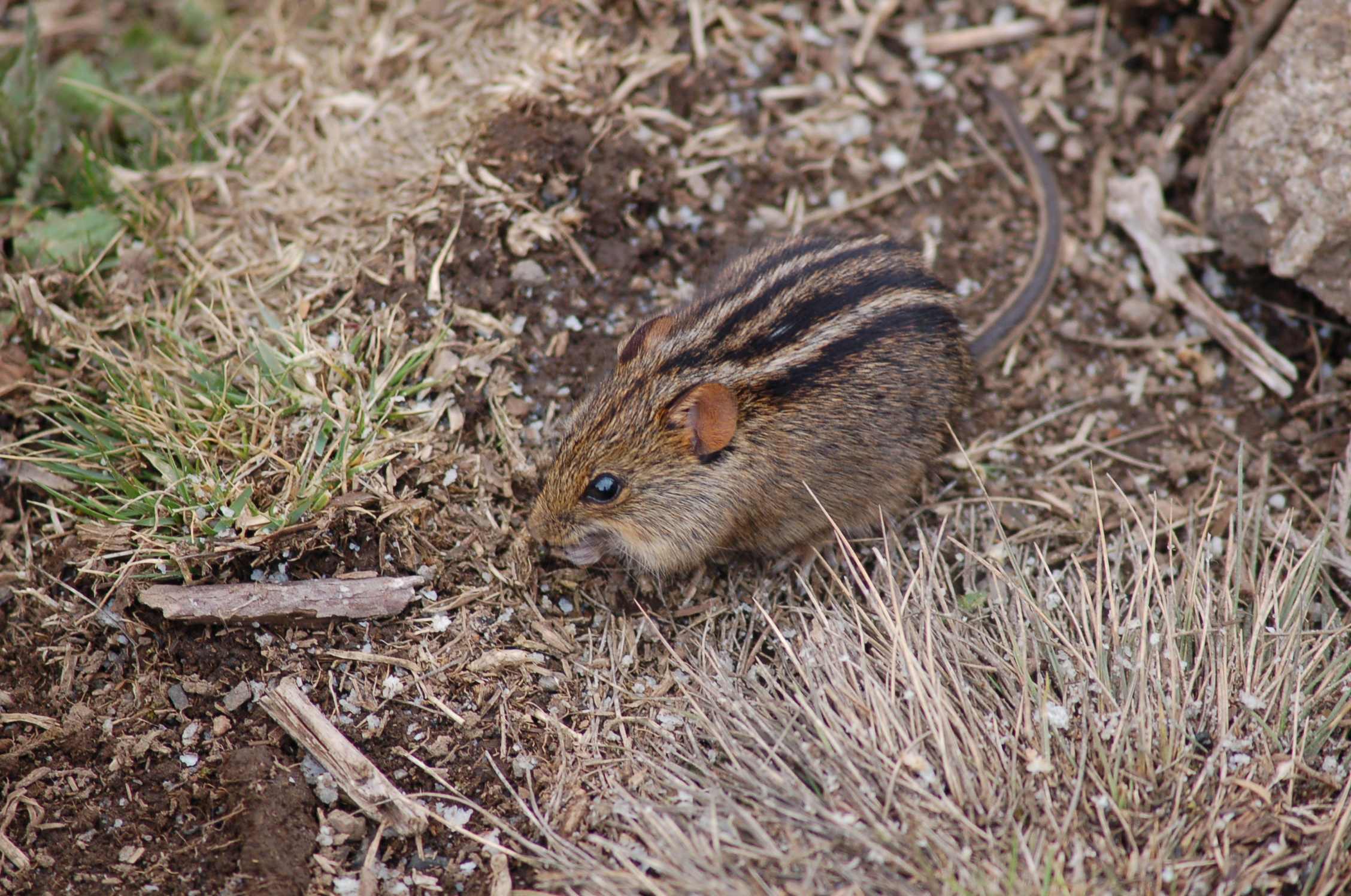

Conservation status
- Least Concern (IUCN 3.1)

Scientific classification
- Kingdom: Animalia
- Phylum: Chordata
- Class: Mammalia
- Infraclass: Placentalia
- Order: Rodentia
- Family: Muridae
- Genus: Rhabdomys
- Species: R. pumilio

Binomial name
- Rhabdomys pumilio (Sparrman, 1784)

Synonyms
- R. bechuanae; R. dilectus

= Four-striped grass mouse =

Southern African species of mammals belonging to the mouse and rat family of rodents

The four-striped grass mouse (Rhabdomys pumilio) or four-striped grass rat is a species of rodent in the family Muridae.

It is found throughout the southern half of Africa up to 2,300 metres (7,500 ft) above sea level, extending as far north as the Democratic Republic of the Congo. Its has many natural habitats such as savannas, shrublands, Mediterranean-type shrubby vegetation, hot deserts, arable land, rural gardens, and urban areas. The presence of grass is the only essential component of its habitat. The four stripes running down its back, along with its red-brown ears, are its most distinct characteristics. Diet consists largely of seeds and plants, and occasionally insects. It nests in self-built burrows.
