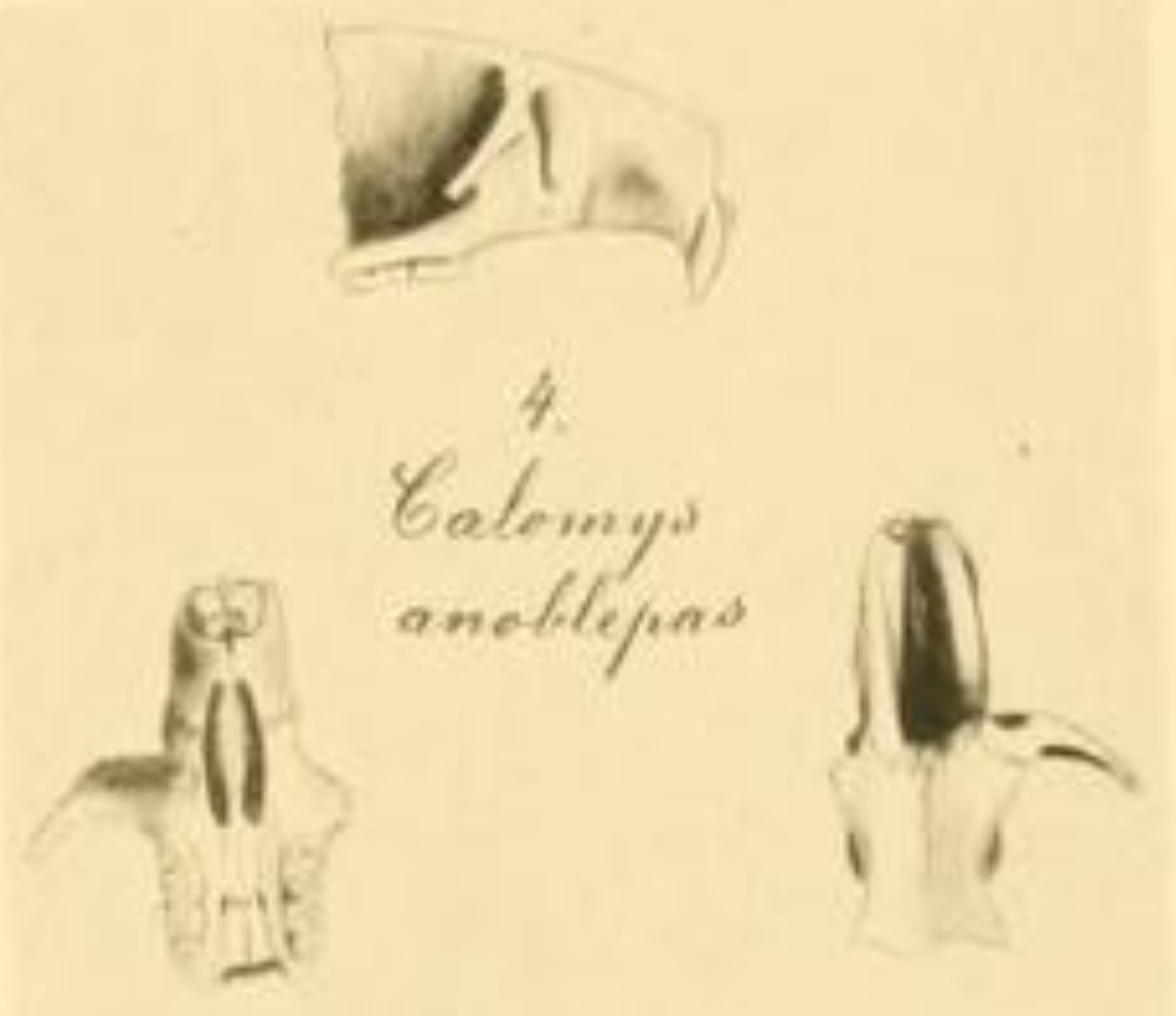
- Front half of the skull of J. anoblepas, seen from the right, above, and below.

Scientific classification
- Kingdom: Animalia
- Phylum: Chordata
- Class: Mammalia
- Order: Rodentia
- Family: Cricetidae
- Subfamily: Sigmodontinae
- Genus: Juliomys; González, 2000

Type species
- Thomasomys pictipes Osgood, 1933

Species
- † Juliomys anoblepas Juliomys ossitenuis Juliomys pictipes Juliomys rimofrons Juliomys ximenezi

= Juliomys =

Genus of rodents

Juliomys is a genus of South American rodents of the family Cricetidae. Five species are known, all found in Argentina and Brazil. They are as follows:

- Juliomys anoblepas (extinct)
- Juliomys ossitenuis
- Juliomys pictipes (Lesser Wilfred's mouse)
- Juliomys rimofrons (Cleft-headed juliomys)
- Juliomys ximenezi (Araucaria Forest tree mouse)
