= Togo mouse =

Conservation status
- Data Deficient (IUCN 3.1)

Scientific classification
- Kingdom: Animalia
- Phylum: Chordata
- Class: Mammalia
- Order: Rodentia
- Family: Muridae
- Subfamily: Leimacomyinae; Musser & Carleton, 2005
- Genus: Leimacomys; Matschie, 1893
- Species: L. buettneri

Binomial name
- Leimacomys buettneri Matschie, 1893
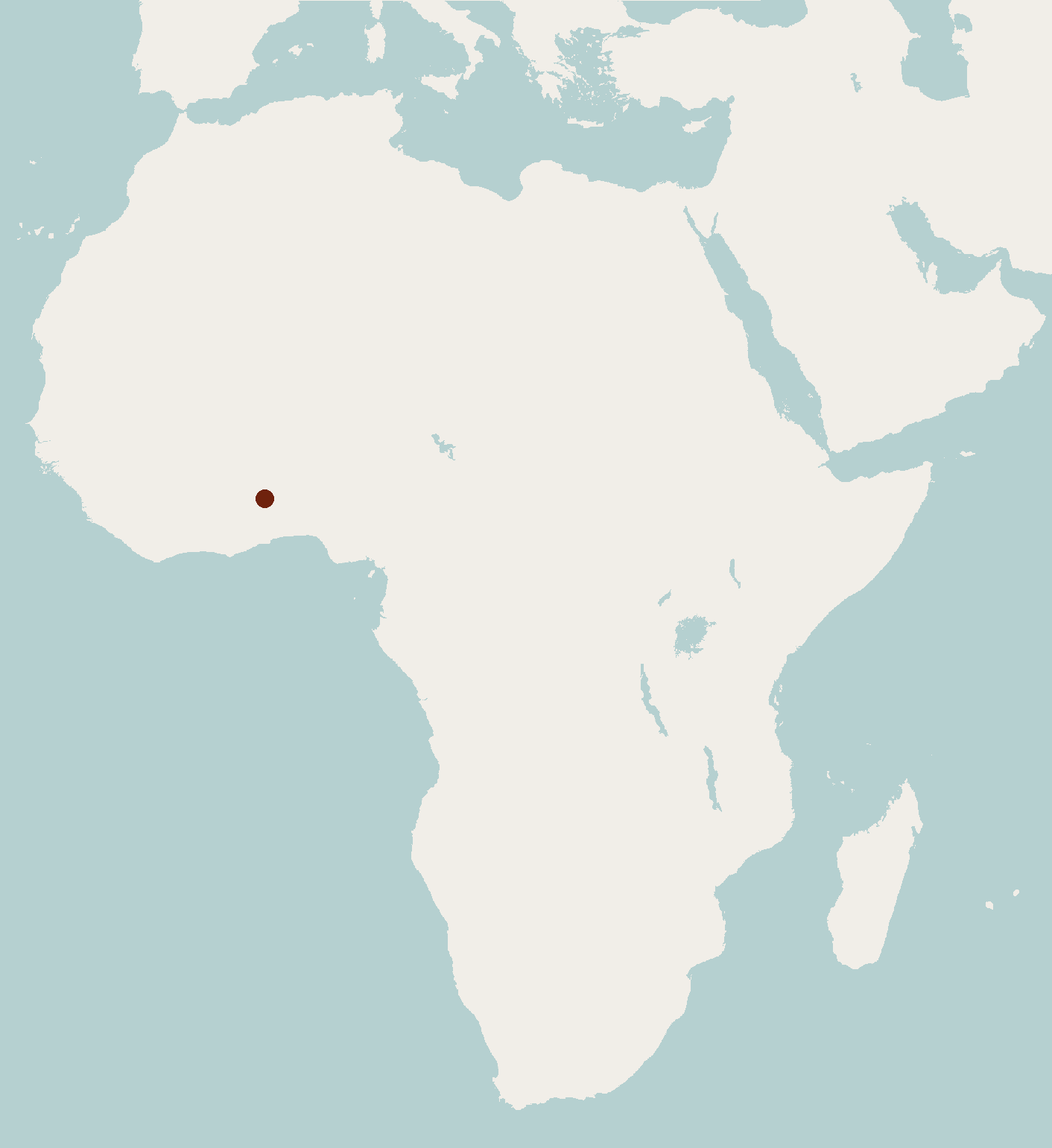

Species of rodent

The Togo mouse (Leimacomys buettneri), also known as Büttner's African forest mouse or the groove-toothed forest mouse, is a unique muroid rodent known from only two specimens taken from near the type locality of Bismarckburg near Yege, Togo, in 1890. Its genus is monotypic.

== Description and natural history ==
The entirety of known material for this species consists of a single, poor-quality dry skin, a fluid-preserved animal, and a cranium and mandible. The cranium and mandible are from different animals. The material is deposited in the Zoologisches Museum of Humboldt University in Berlin, Germany.

The head and body length is 118 mm (4.6 in) with a tail of 37 mm (1.5 in). This tail is unusually short relative to the body length (ratio of 37%) and is considered an important diagnostic feature. The animal is dark-to-grey brown above and pale grey brown below. Its ears are small and hairy. The feet are also somewhat hairy. The tail may be naked or slightly haired.

The incisors are shallowly grooved. The snout is long and wide, the interorbital width is broad, and the zygomatic plate is large.

Based on skull morphology, the Togo mouse is presumed to be insectivorous. Very little is known about the habits of this unusual mouse.

== Classification ==
Leimacomys has been transferred back and forth between the Dendromurinae and the Murinae since its discovery. It most closely resembles Lophuromys, which has been transferred to a newly erected Deomyinae on the basis of molecular data. The association with Lophuromys is thought to be due to convergent evolution due to similar diets. Tooth characters resemble dendromurines, Mystromys or basal gerbils. Denys et al. generated a phylogeny that suggested, with limited support, Leimacomys is a sister taxon to the Gerbillinae.

Musser and Carleton chose to erect a new subfamily, Leimacomyinae, to house this species. They placed it in the family Muridae due to its potential connection to either the Gerbillinae or Deomyinae, but emphasized that a broad phylogenetic study including Leimacomys, and a host of nesomyids and murids, is needed to determine its appropriate position.

== Conservation status ==
The Togo mouse is considered to be either critically endangered or extinct depending on the authority. Schlitter classified it as extinct, because subsequent surveys to the area failed to recover it. Grubb et al. (1998) noted these surveys inadequately sampled appropriate habitat in Togo and neighboring Ghana, and they were reluctant to declare the species extinct. Musser and Carleton also emphasized that the insectivorous muroids as a group have proven difficult to capture, and intense surveys of high-elevation forests in this region are required to determine if it still persists.

The IUCN currently describes the Togo mouse as "data deficient". This species has also been recently added on Re:wild's 25 most wanted lost species.
