= Lesser Wilfred's mouse =

Conservation status
- Least Concern (IUCN 3.1)

Scientific classification
- Kingdom: Animalia
- Phylum: Chordata
- Class: Mammalia
- Order: Rodentia
- Family: Cricetidae
- Subfamily: Sigmodontinae
- Genus: Juliomys
- Species: J. pictipes

Binomial name
- Juliomys pictipes Osgood, 1933

Synonyms
- Thomasomys pictipes Wilfredomys pictipes

Species of rodent

The lesser Wilfred's mouse (Juliomys pictipes) is a species of South American rodents of the family Cricetidae. It was first described by Wilfred H. Osgood under the name Thomasomys pictipes, then into the genus Wilfredomys, and now known as Juliomys pictipes. The lesser Wilfred's mouse is endemic to northeastern Argentina, southeastern Brazil and eastern Paraguay. Its physical appearance ranges from dark brown to light orange coloration and the typical size is small to medium. This species is arboreal, spending most of its time trees and living in the local forests at altitudes from sea level to 2,000 m (6,560 ft). Currently, this species is listed as Least Concern by the IUCN, but, threats include livestock farming, ranching, and wood harvesting.

== Taxonomy ==
Juliomys pictipes was first discovered by Osgood in 1933. It was originally named Thomasomys pictipes. For several decades, the placement of this species was uncertain and fairly recently changed to Juliomys pictipes to fit under the subfamily of Sigmodontinae rodents. Currently, there are four living species under the genus of Juliomys. The taxon identifier is 89132.

== Description ==
This animal is considered to be small to medium sized Sigmodontinae rodents. They are dark-brown to light-orange brown. Other characteristics include having long soft fur with a brownish ochraceous dorsum. This small-bodied animal is a pentalophodont with a tail longer than its head and body. Juliomys pictipes have short, broad feet with 6 plantar pads. In addition, the skull has identifying features including having a short rostrum and rounded braincase. Another diagnostic characteristic is the presence of an open slit in the suture between the frontal bones. Lastly, its karyotype has 2n = 36, FN = 34.

== Distribution and habitat ==
It is found in northeastern Argentina and southeastern Brazil and limited to the tropical and subtropical moist forests of those countries. The type locality was first discovered in Misiones, Argentina and occurs in the Atlantic forest.

== Ecology ==
The species is arboreal. A baby of this species is often called a pinkie, kitten or pup. The females are called doe and males are called buck. Groups of this species are called a nest, colony, harvest, horde or mischief.

== Status ==
The Lesser wilfred's mouse is listed as Least Concern. But, threats that increase mortality or decrease quality of life include livestock farming, ranching, and wood harvesting.
