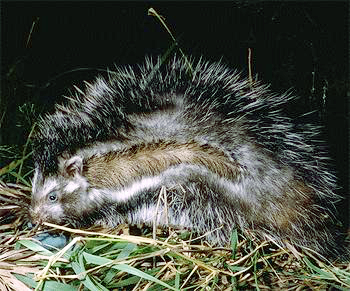

Conservation status
- Least Concern (IUCN 3.1)

Scientific classification
- Kingdom: Animalia
- Phylum: Chordata
- Class: Mammalia
- Order: Rodentia
- Family: Muridae
- Subfamily: Lophiomyinae; Milne-Edwards, 1867
- Genus: Lophiomys; Milne-Edwards, 1867
- Species: L. imhausi

Binomial name
- Lophiomys imhausi Milne-Edwards, 1867
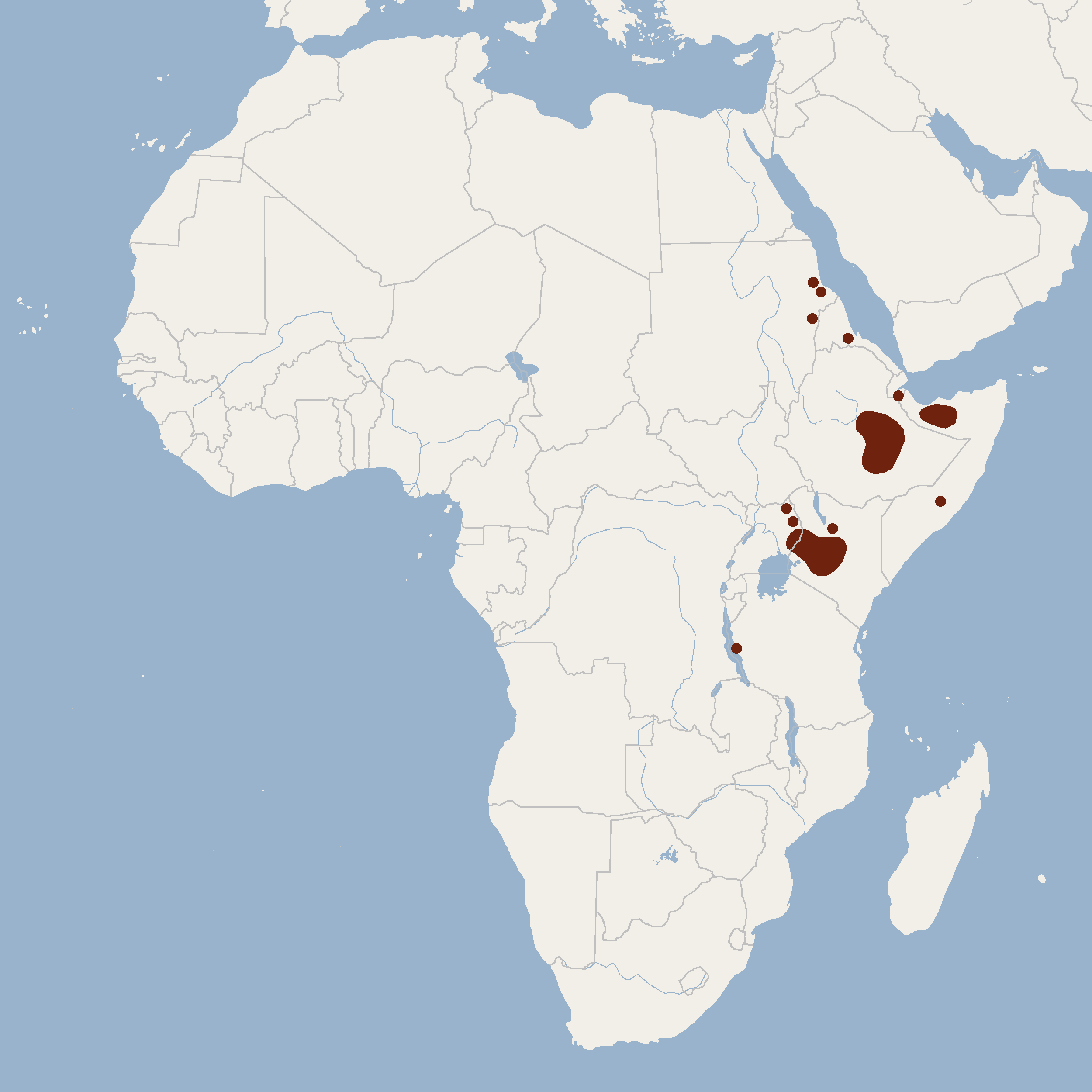
- maned rat distribution

= Maned rat =

Maned rat Temporal range: Early Pleistocene - Recent

Species of rodent

The maned rat or African crested rat (Lophiomys imhausi) is a large nocturnal, long-haired and bushy-tailed East African rodent that superficially resembles a porcupine. The world's only known poisonous rodent, the maned rat coats itself in toxins from plants to fend off predators.

== Description ==

The head and body length ranges from 18–30.5 centimetres (7.1–12.0 in) long, with the tail 14.5–20.5 centimetres (5.7–8.1 in) long; the typical weight is 590–920 g (21–32 oz). The coat consists of long, silver and black-tipped guard hairs over a dense, woolly, grey and white undercoat, with the face and limbs having short, black fur. A mane of longer, coarser black-and-white banded hairs extends from the top of the animal's head to just beyond the base of the tail. This mane is bordered by a broad, white-bordered strip of hairs covering an area of glandular skin. The forelimbs and hind limbs have short black fur. The forefeet are large and digit 1 of the forefeet does not have a claw, while digits 2-5 have a well developed claw.

When the animal is threatened or excited, the mane erects and this strip parts, exposing the glandular area. The hairs in this area are, at the tips, like ordinary hair, but are otherwise spongy, fibrous, and absorbent with a honeycomb structure. The rat is known to deliberately smear these hairs with poison from the bark of the Acokanthera schimperi, the poison arrow tree, on which it chews, thus creating a defense mechanism that can sicken or even kill predators which attempt to bite it. It is the only rodent known to use and store toxins from a different species in nature to protect itself, with no known adverse effects to themselves.

L. imhausi differs from typical Muridae in having the temporal fossa roofed over a thin plate of bone, rudimentary clavicles, and an opposable hallux. The dorsal surface of the skull is covered with small bony projections which gives it a pebbled look. These projections are 0.3 mm across and are separated every 0.3 mm. On these grounds, it has been made the type of its own subfamily Lophiomyinae in the family Cricetidae; its dentition, is typical Cricetine. The dental formula is 1/1, 0/0, 0/0, 3/3, giving it a total of 16 teeth. The cusps of the molars are arranged biserially and connected medially by longitudinal enamel crests.

== Diet ==
Its diet in the wild consists largely of leaves, fruit, and other plant material, but it has been known to eat meat, cereals, root vegetables, and insects in captivity. Food is eaten by sitting on its haunches and using its forepaws to bring food items to its mouth. It is the only species in the super family Muroidea whose stomach is highly compartmentalised. The stomach contains five anatomically discrete sections that superficially resemble the sacculated configuration characteristic of ruminant artiodactyls. Because of its large size and weight, L. imhausi may be one of the few muroid rodents that has symbiotic microflora in the foregut which can metabolise cellulose by gastric fermentation.

== Habitat ==
The habitat of the maned rat ranges from nearly sea level in Ethiopia and Somalia, to more typically the drier, highland forests and woodlands of Somalia, Ethiopia, Sudan, Tanzania, Uganda, and Kenya. Fossil remains have been found as far north as Palestine, however. They are often found in rocky areas or in hollow tree trunks and holes along the tops of ravines, and have also been found nesting among rocks on cliff-faces.

== Reproduction ==
The maned rat was believed to be solitary, but is now known to be somewhat sociable, with multiple animals trapped in the same territory; they purr and groom one another. Thus it is possible they form family groups of a male, female, and offspring. The litter size is 1–3. The young are slightly haired at birth and white markings and black stripes on the body are visible after 9 days. By day 13, the eyes open. The hair is sufficiently long that the crest can be erectile by day 20. The newborns become mobile by day 23 and are weaned by day 40.

== General and cited references ==
- Jansa, S. A. and M. Weksler. 2004. Phylogeny of muroid rodents: relationships within and among major lineages as determined by IRBP gene sequences. Molecular Phylogenetics and Evolution, 31:256-276.
- Kingdon, Jonathan. East African Mammals. Chicago: University of Chicago Press, 1974. 519–526.
- Jonathan Kingdon, Bernard Agwanda, Margaret Kinnaird, Timothy O'Brien, Christopher Holland, Tom Gheysens, Maxime Boulet-Audet and Fritz Vollrath 2011 A poisonous surprise under the coat of the African crested rat Proc. R. Soc. B doi:10.1098/rspb.2011.1169
- Jonathan Kingdon, David Happold, Thomas Butynski, Michael Hoffmann, Meredith Happold, Jan Kalina, Mammals of Africa, Vol. 1-6
- Jonathan Kingdon, The Kingdon Field Guide to African Mammals
- Schlitter, D. (2016). "Lophiomys imhausi". IUCN Red List of Threatened Species. 2016 e.T12308A22368581. doi:10.2305/IUCN.UK.2016-2.RLTS.T12308A22368581.en. Database entry includes a brief justification of why this species is of least concern
