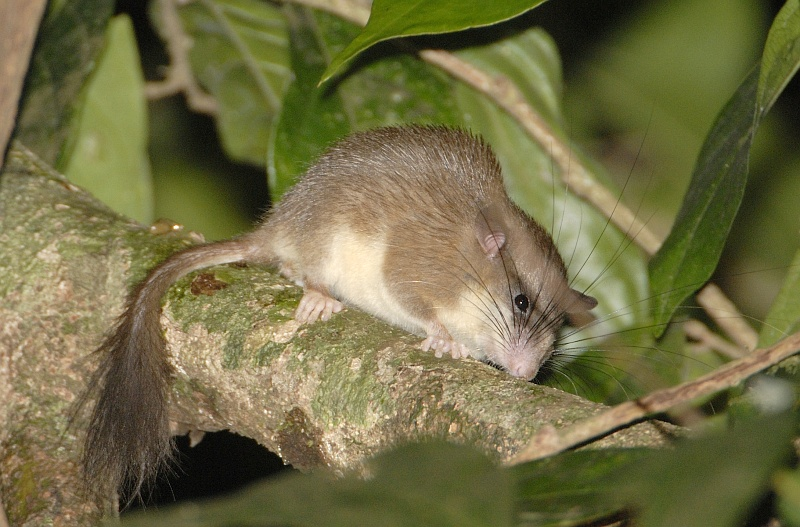
- Malabar spiny dormouse, Platacanthomys lasiurus

Scientific classification
- Kingdom: Animalia
- Phylum: Chordata
- Class: Mammalia
- Order: Rodentia
- Superfamily: Muroidea
- Family: Platacanthomyidae; Alston, 1876

Type genus
- Platacanthomys Blyth, 1859

Genera
- †Neocometes; Platacanthomys; Typhlomys
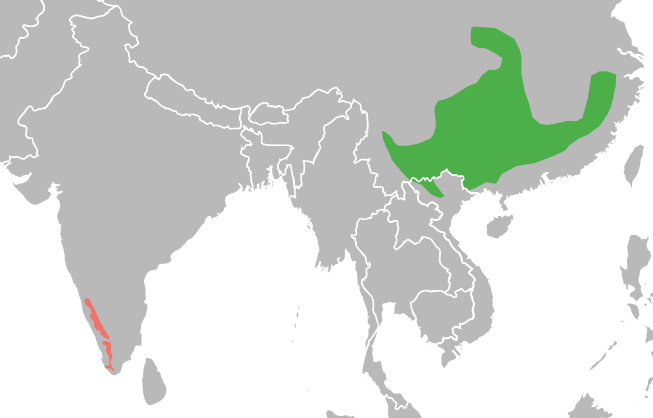
- Platacanthomyidae distribution. Platacanthomys lasiurus in red, Typhlomys cinereus in green.

= Platacanthomyidae =

Platacanthomyids Temporal range: Early Miocene – Recent

Family of rodents

The rodent family Platacanthomyidae, or Oriental dormice, includes the spiny dormice and the Chinese pygmy dormice. In spite of their appearance, these animals are not true dormice, but are part of the large and complex superfamily Muroidea. The platacanthomyids can be distinguished from the true dormice, because they have no premolars, giving them three cheek teeth, like their relatives, the Muroidea.

The evolutionary relationship of the Platacanthomyidae was uncertain until a molecular phylogenetic study found it to be the earliest extant lineage to branch within the superfamily Muroidea. They can be distinguished from both the family Spalacidae and the Eumuroida (all non-spalacid and non-platacanthomyid muroids), by the distinct shape of their infraorbital canal and by the presence of multiple openings in the palate of the skull. On the basis of these two characteristics, they have been considered to be distinct from all other muroids. More work is needed to determine the evolutionary position of this subfamily.

The Platacanthomyidae contain three genera – Neocometes, Platacanthomys (spiny dormice), and Typhlomys (pygmy dormice) – but only three extant species.

== Taxonomy ==
- Family Platacanthomyidae
  - Genus †Neocometes
    - †Neocometes brunonis
    - †Neocometes orientalis
    - †Neocometes similis
  - Genus Platacanthomys (spiny dormice)
    - †Platacanthomys dianensis
    - Platacanthomys lasiurus (spiny dormouse)
  - Genus Typhlomys (pygmy dormice)
    - Typhlomys cinereus (Chinese pygmy dormouse)
    - Typhlomys nanus
    - †Typhlomys hipparionium
    - †Typhlomys intermedius
    - †Typhlomys macrourus
    - †Typhlomys primitivus
