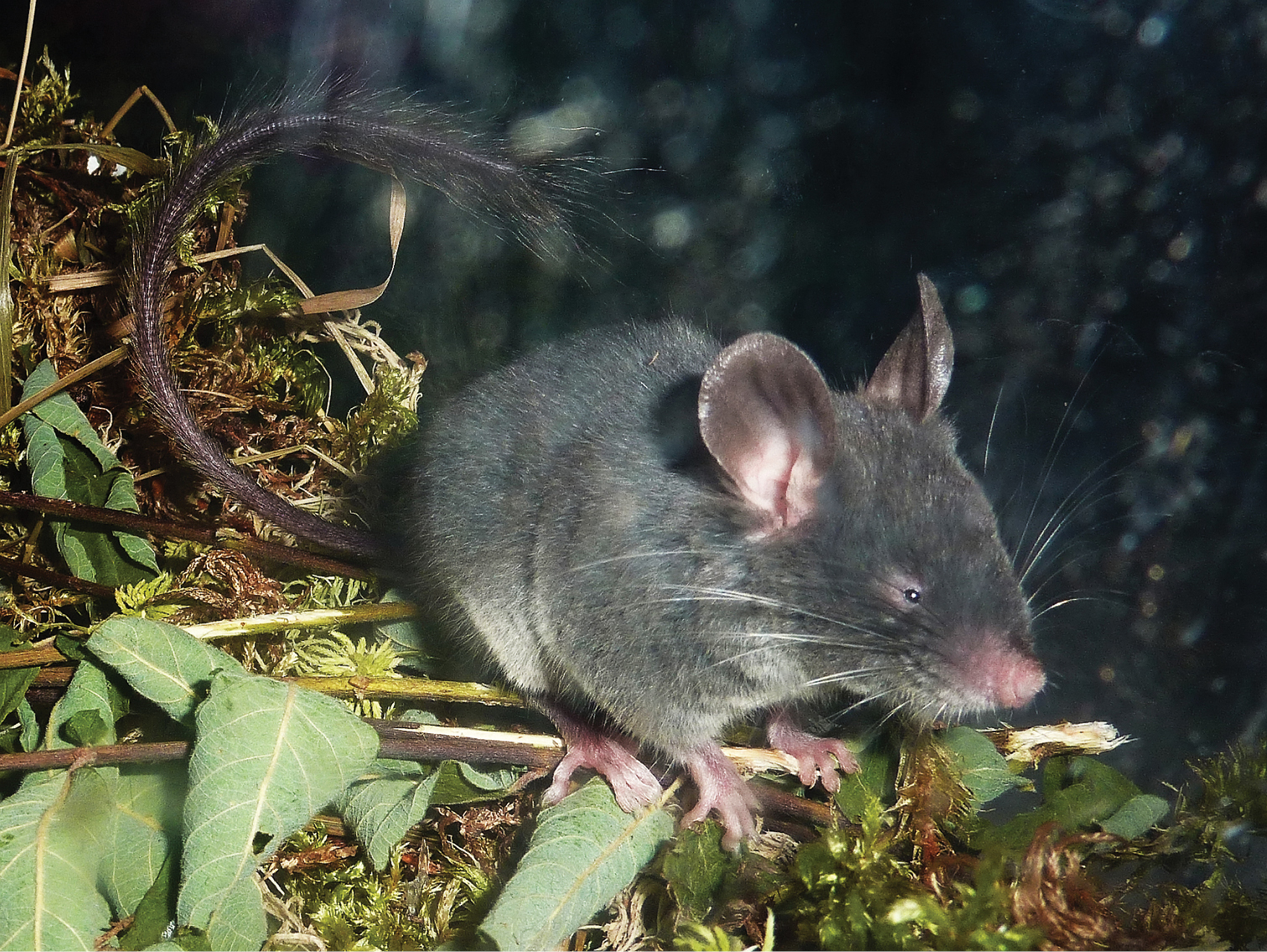

Conservation status
- Least Concern (IUCN 3.1)

Scientific classification
- Kingdom: Animalia
- Phylum: Chordata
- Class: Mammalia
- Order: Rodentia
- Family: Platacanthomyidae
- Genus: Typhlomys; Milne-Edwards, 1877
- Species: T. cinereus

Binomial name
- Typhlomys cinereus Milne-Edwards, 1877

Subspecies
- T. c. cinereus T. c. chapensis T. c. daloushanensis T. c. guangxiensis T. c. jingdongensis
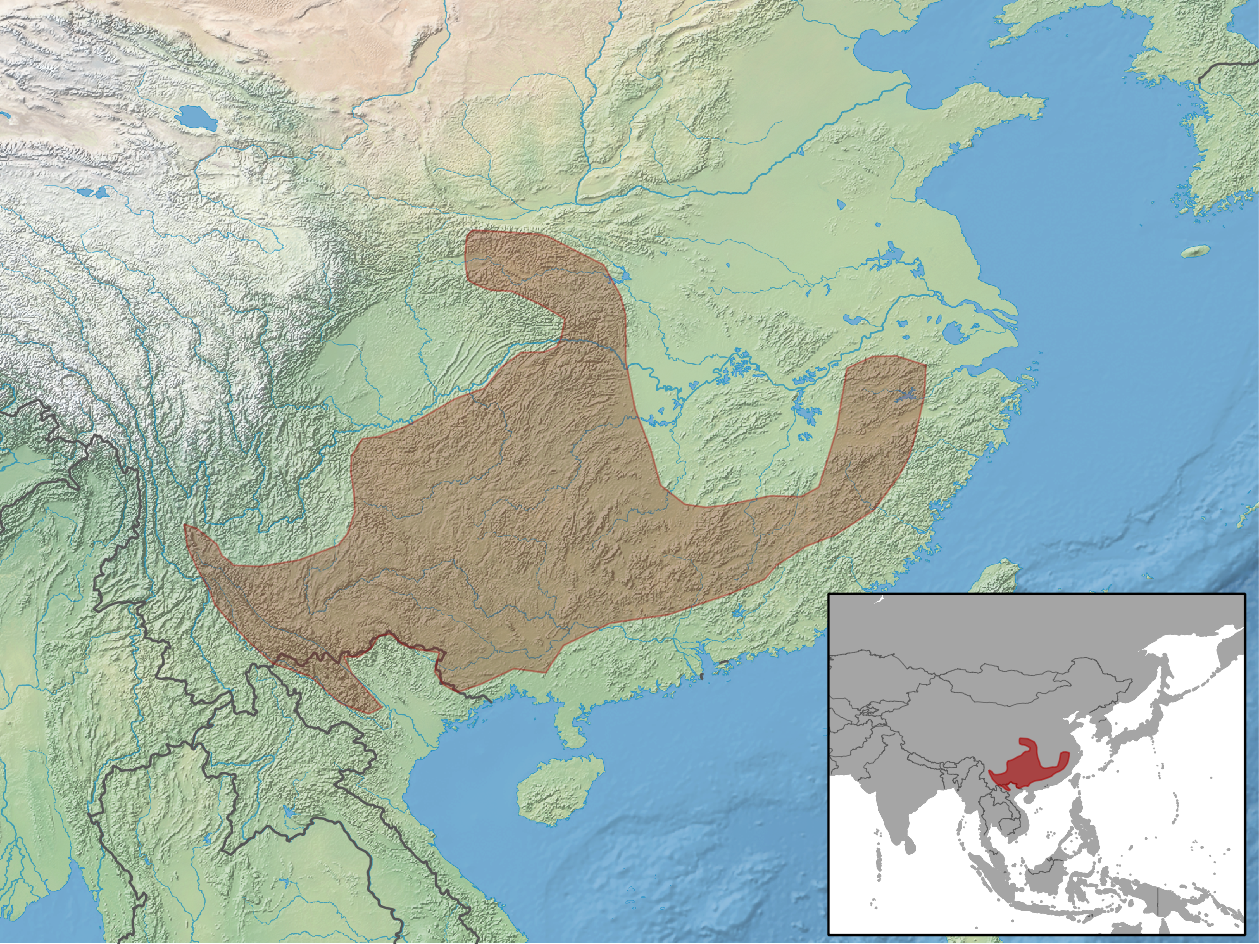

= Chinese pygmy dormouse =

Chinese pygmy dormouse Temporal range: Late Miocene - recent

Species of rodent

The Chinese pygmy dormouse (Typhlomys cinereus) is a species of rodent of the family Platacanthomyidae found in China and Vietnam.

== Subspecies ==
Musser and Carleton (2005) recognized five subspecies.

The northwest Vietnamese form Typhlomys cinereus chapensis is often treated as falling within the normal variance of Chinese T. cinereus, but is now seen as a distinct species. In 2014, Typhlomys cinereus chapens (also known as the Chapa pygmy dormouse) was recognised by Abramov et al as an individual species and separate from T. cinereus.

- Pygmy dormouse or soft-furred tree mouse Typhlomys cinereus Milne-Edwards, 1877
  - T. c. cinereus Milne-Edwards, 1877
  - T. c. chapensis Osgood, 1932
  - T. c. daloushanensis Wang & Li, 1996
  - T. c. guangxiensis Wang & Chen, 1996
  - T. c. jingdongensis Wu & Wang, 1984
- T. zhengkuni Zhang et al., 2026

== Description ==
The Chinese pygmy dormouse grows to a head-and-body length of about 67 to 90 mm (2.6 to 3.5 in) with a tail of one and half times its body-length. It has prominent, nearly hairless ears and white whiskers. The dorsal fur is dark greyish-brown and the underparts are grey with white-tipped hairs. The tail has whorls of scales near its base while the hindermost two-thirds are bushy with a tufted white tail-tip.

== Distribution ==
The Chinese pygmy dormouse is native to Vietnam and the Chinese provinces of Anhui, Fujian, Guangxi, Guizhou, Hubei, Hunan, Jiangxi, Shaanxi, Sichuan, Yunnan, and Zhejiang.

== Behaviour ==
The Chinese pygmy dormouse lives in mountain forests, including bamboo forests, where it climbs in trees. It can also burrow, but is not blind (a fact that might have been deduced from the genus name Typhlomys). It feeds on parts of plants including leaves, stems, fruit, and seeds. Little is known about the reproduction of this species, but the females have four nipples and pregnant females containing two to four embryos have been found. It may use echolocation for its nocturnal activities.

== Status ==
The Chinese pygmy dormouse is retiring and seldom seen, so may be more abundant than is apparent. It is present in primary forest and the edge of degraded forest, but does not seem to inhabit secondary forest. A number of national parks and other protected areas are within its range, and no particular threats have been identified, so the International Union for Conservation of Nature has assessed it as being of "least concern".
