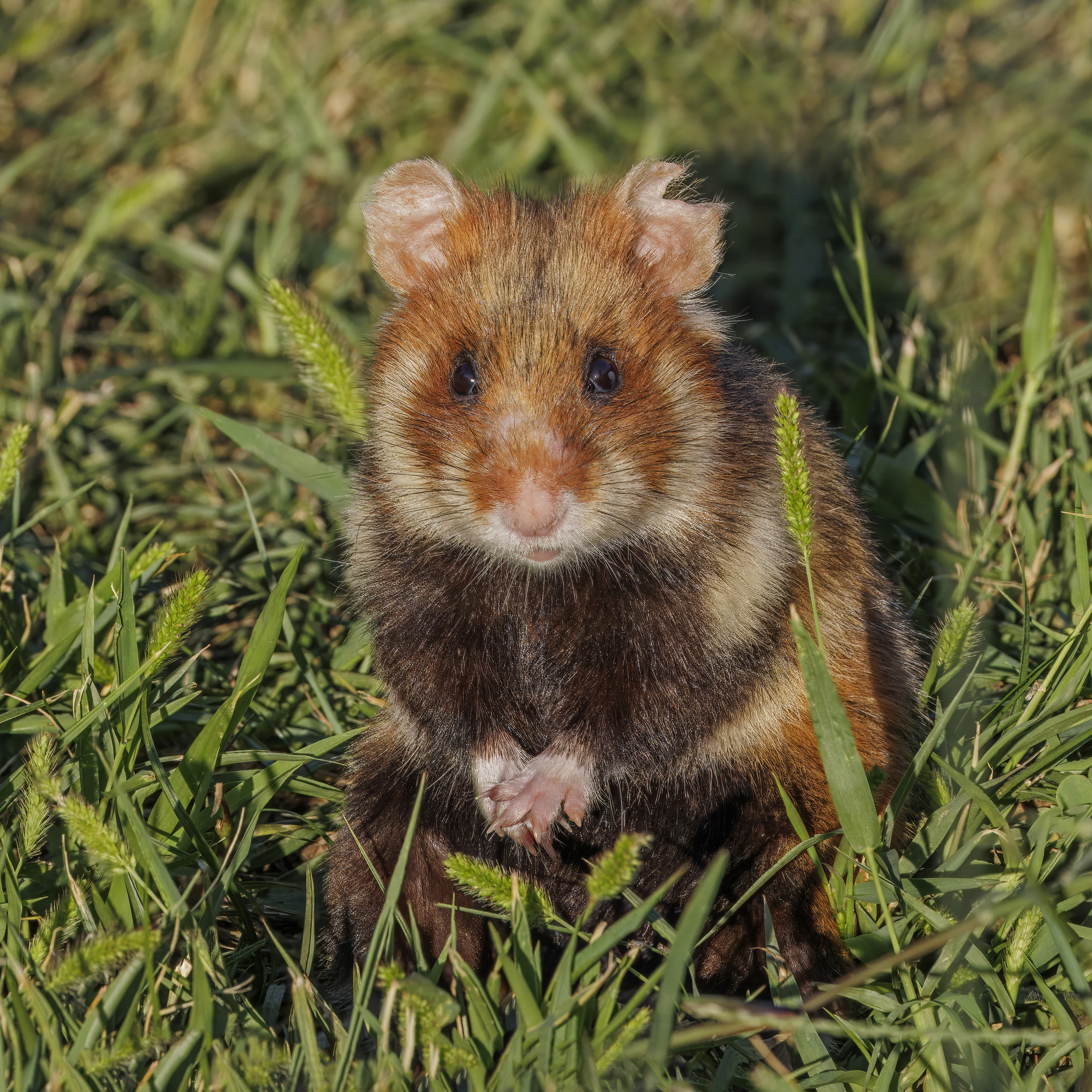
- European hamster, Cricetus cricetus

Scientific classification
- Kingdom: Animalia
- Phylum: Chordata
- Class: Mammalia
- Order: Rodentia
- Superfamily: Muroidea
- Family: Cricetidae; J. Fischer, 1817

Type genus
- Cricetus Linnaeus, 1758

Subfamilies
- Arvicolinae; Cricetinae; Neotominae; Sigmodontinae; Tylomyinae and see below
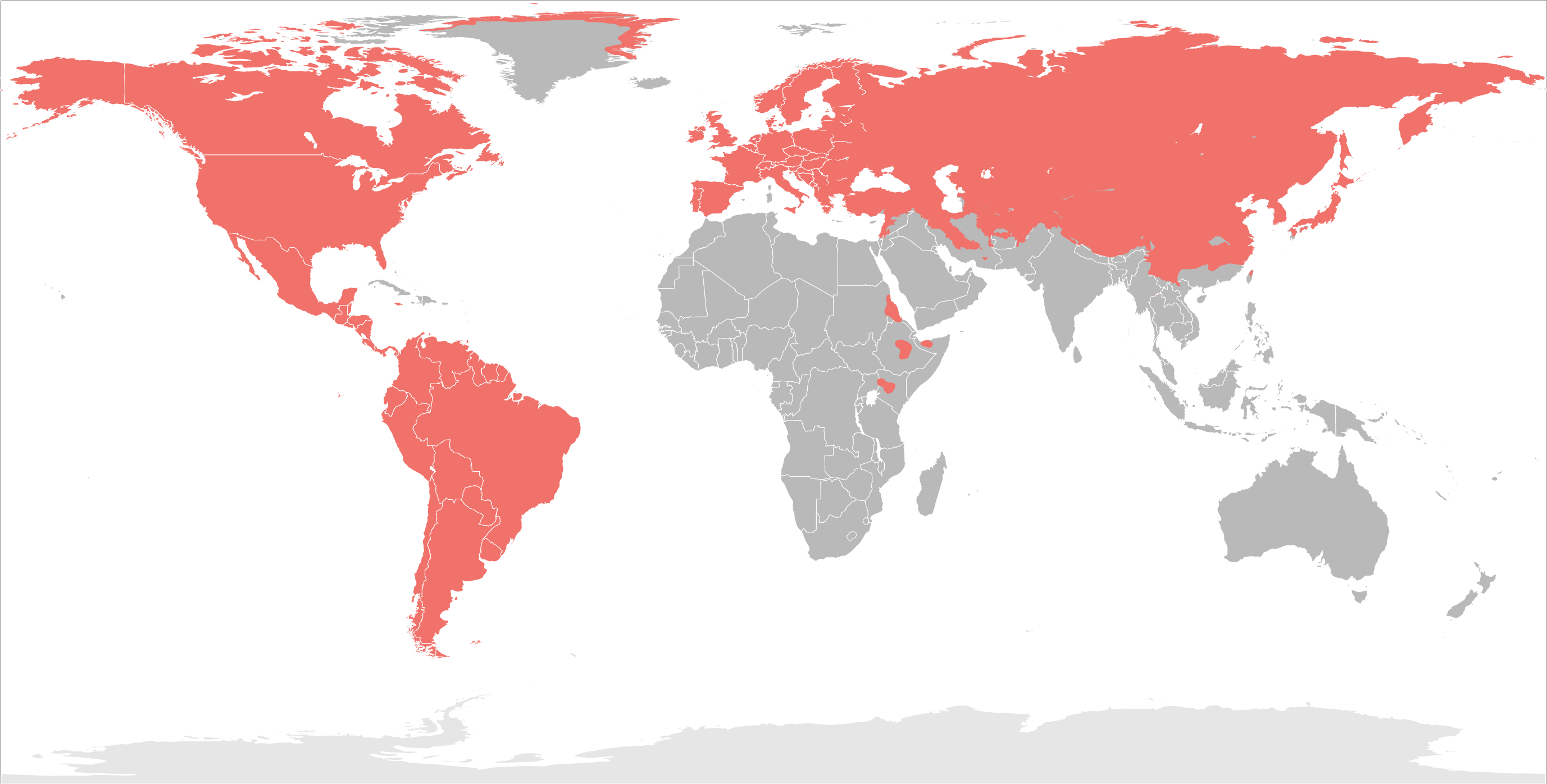
- Cricetidae distribution

= Cricetidae =

Cricetidae Temporal range: Early Oligocene–recent

Family of rodents

The Cricetidae are a family of rodents in the large and complex superfamily Muroidea. It includes true hamsters, voles, lemmings, muskrats, and New World rats and mice. At over 870 species, it is one of the largest family of mammals and has members throughout the Americas, Europe, and Asia.

== Characteristics ==
The cricetids are small mammals, ranging from just 5–8 cm (2.0–3.1 in) in length and 7 g (0.25 oz) in weight in the New World pygmy mouse up to 41–62 cm (16–24 in) and 1.1 kg (2.4 lb) in the muskrat. The length of their tails varies greatly in relation to their bodies, and they may be either furred or sparsely haired. The fur of most species is brownish in colour, often with a white underbelly, but many other patterns exist, especially in the cricetine and arvicoline subfamilies.

Like the Old World mice, cricetids are adapted to a wide range of habitats, from the high Arctic to tropical rainforests and hot deserts. Some are arboreal, with long balancing tails and other adaptations for climbing, while others are semiaquatic, with webbed feet and small external ears. Yet others are burrowing animals, or ground-dwellers.

Their diets are similarly variable, with herbivorous, omnivorous, and insectivorous species all being known. They all have large, gnawing, incisors separated from grinding molar teeth by a gap, or diastema. Molar teeth may be buno-lophodont like in cricetines or lophodont like in arvicolines or some New World mice. Although a few exceptions occur, the dental formula for the great majority of cricetids is:

Dentition
1.0.0.3
1.0.0.3

Cricetids' populations can increase rapidly in times of plenty, due to a combination of short gestation periods between 15 and 50 days, and large litter sizes relative to many other mammals. The young are typically born blind, hairless, and helpless.

== Evolution and systematics ==
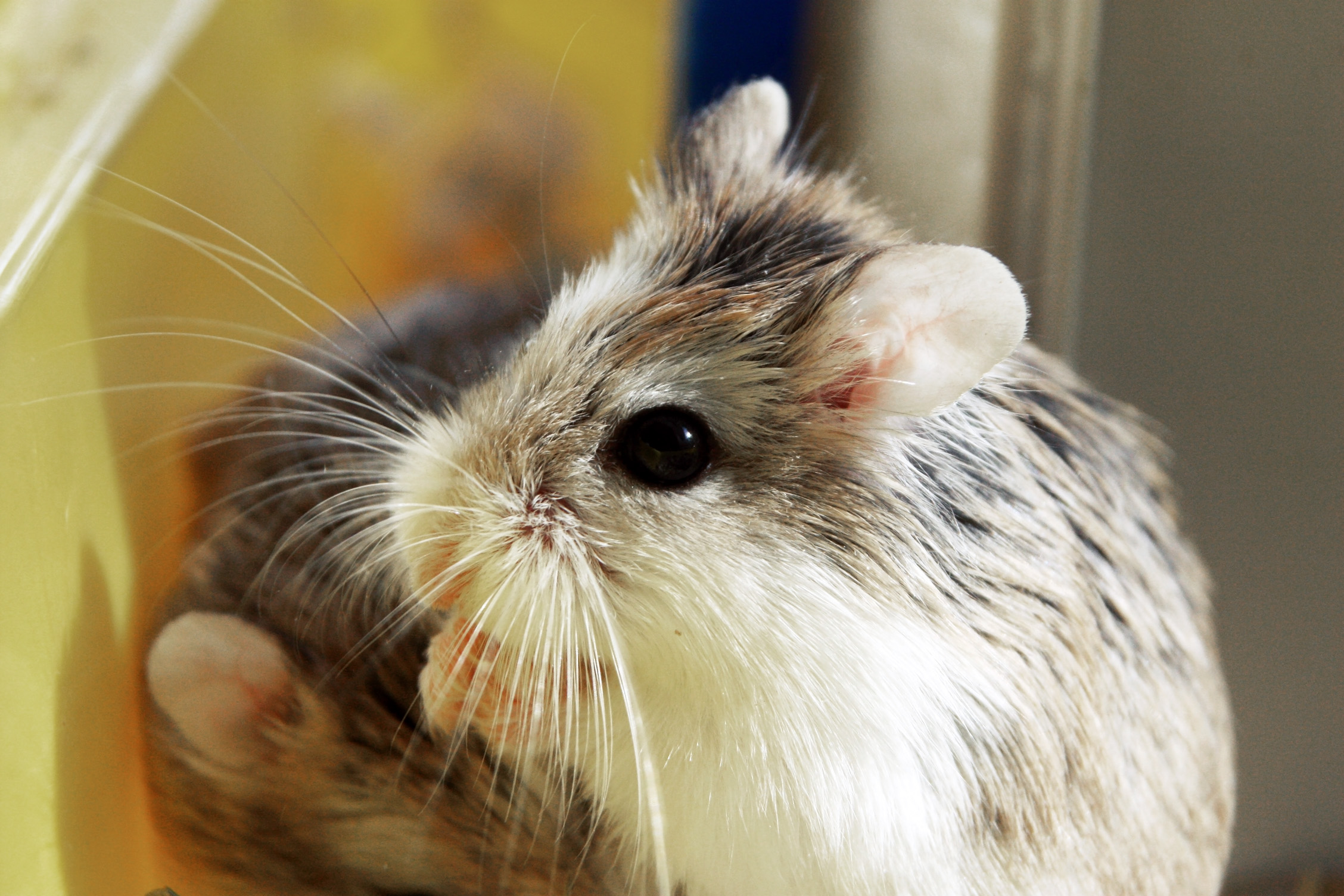
Roborovski's dwarf hamster (Phodopus roborovskii) of the Cricetinae

The cricetids first evolved in the Old World during the Early Oligocene. They soon adapted to a wide range of habitats, and spread throughout the world. The voles and lemmings arose later, during the Pliocene, and rapidly diversified during the Pleistocene.

The circumscription of Cricetidae has gone through several permutations. Some members of the family as currently defined have been placed in the family Muridae. Some muroids have historically been placed in Cricetidae, such as mouse-like hamsters (subfamily Calomyscinae, family Calomyscidae), gerbils (subfamily Gerbillinae, family Muridae), the crested rat (subfamily Lophiomyinae, family Muridae), zokors (subfamily Myospalacinae, family Spalacidae), the white-tailed rat (subfamily Mystromyinae, family Nesomyidae), and spiny dormice (subfamily Platacanthomyinae, family Platacanthomyidae). Multigene DNA sequence studies have shown the subfamilies listed below to form a monophyletic group (that is, they share a common ancestor more recently than with any other group), and other groups now considered muroids should not be included in the Cricetidae.

The cricetids thus currently include one fossil and five extant subfamilies, with about 142 living genera and over 870 species:

- Arvicolinae — voles, lemmings, muskrat
- Cricetinae — hamsters
- †Democricetodontinae (fossil)
- Neotominae — North American rats and mice, including deer mice, pack rats, and grasshopper mice
- Sigmodontinae — New World rats and mice, predominantly South American, such as brucies
- Tylomyinae — New World climbing rats and relatives
- †Copemys (fossil)
- †Eumys (fossil)
- †Wilsoneumys (fossil)
