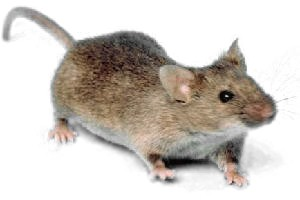
- House mouse, Mus musculus

Scientific classification
- Kingdom: Animalia
- Phylum: Chordata
- Class: Mammalia
- Infraclass: Placentalia
- Order: Rodentia
- Superfamily: Muroidea
- Family: Muridae; Illiger, 1811

Type genus
- Mus Linnaeus, 1758

Subfamilies
- Deomyinae; Gerbillinae; Lophiomyinae; Leimacomyinae; Murinae
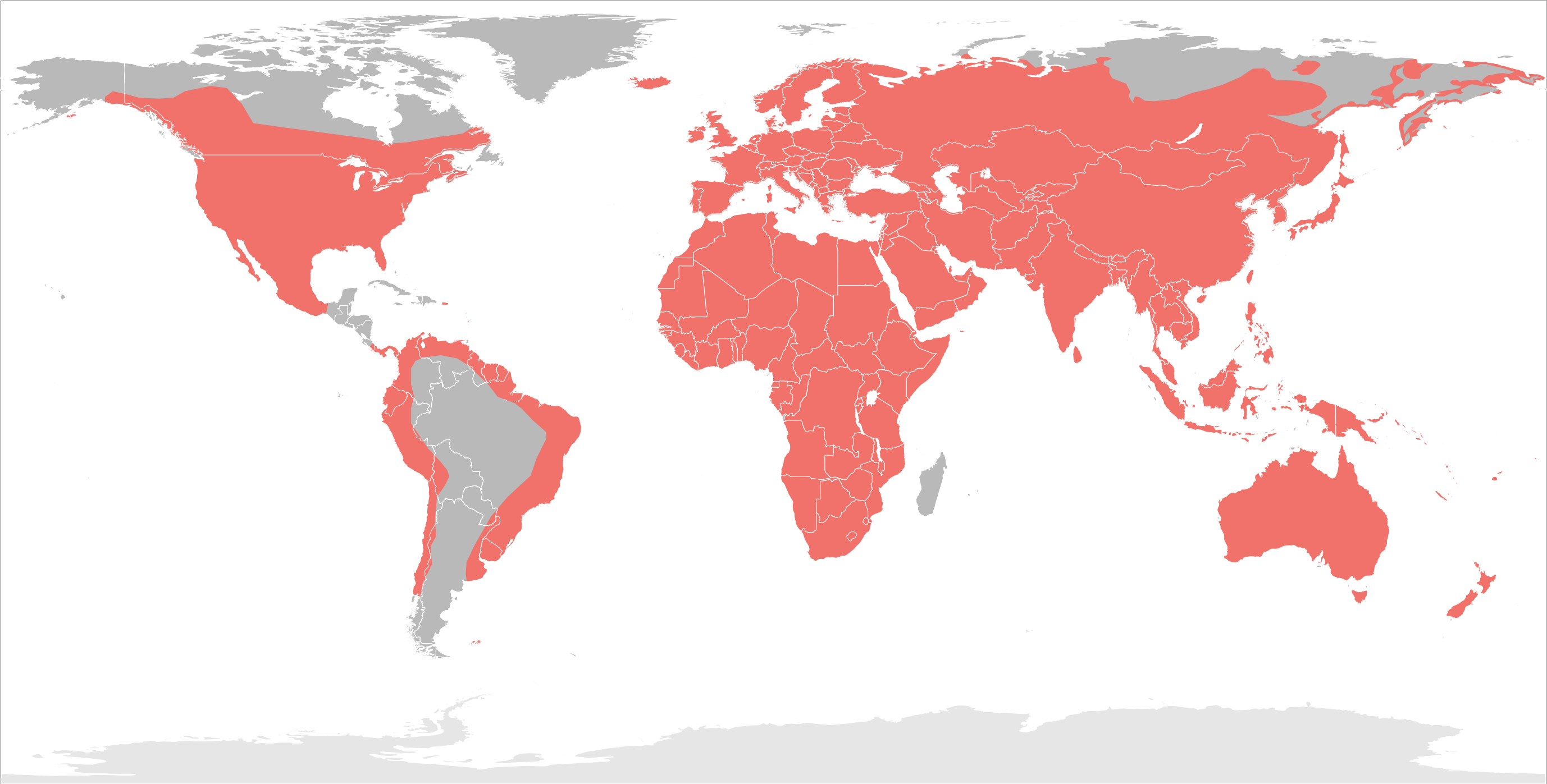
- Muridae distribution

= Muridae =

Muridae Temporal range: Early Miocene – Recent

Family of rodents

The Muridae, or murids, are either the largest or second-largest family of rodents and of mammals, containing approximately 870 species, including many species of mice, rats, and gerbils found naturally throughout Eurasia, Africa, and Australia.

The name Muridae comes from the Latin mus (genitive muris), meaning "mouse", since all true mice belong to the family, with the more typical mice belonging to the genus Mus.

== Distribution and habitat ==
Murids are found nearly everywhere in the world, though many subfamilies have narrower ranges. Murids are not found in Antarctica or many oceanic islands. Although none of them are native to the Americas, a few species, notably the house mouse and black rat, have been introduced worldwide. Murids occupy a broad range of ecosystems from tropical forests to tundras. Fossorial, arboreal, and semiaquatic murid species occur, though most are terrestrial animals. The extensive list of niches filled by murids helps to explain their relative abundance.

== Diet and dentition ==
A broad range of feeding habits is found in murids, ranging from herbivorous and omnivorous species to specialists that consume strictly earthworms, certain species of fungi, or aquatic insects. Most genera consume plant matter and small invertebrates, often storing seeds and other plant matter for winter consumption. Murids have sciurognathous jaws (an ancestral character in rodents) and a diastema is present. Murids lack canines and premolars. Generally, three molars (though sometimes only one or two) are found, and the nature of the molars varies by genus and feeding habit.

== Reproduction ==
Some murids are highly social, while others are solitary. Females commonly produce several litters annually. In warm regions, breeding may occur year-round. Though the lifespans of most genera are generally less than two years, murids have high reproductive potential and their populations tend to increase rapidly and then drastically decline when food resources have been exhausted. This is often seen in a three- to four-year cycle.

== Characteristics ==
The murids are small mammals, typically around 10 cm (3.9 in) long excluding the tail, but ranging from 4.5 to 8 cm (1.8 to 3.1 in) in the African pygmy mouse to 50 cm (20 in) in the northern Luzon giant cloud rat. They typically have slender bodies with scaled tails longer than the body, and pointed snouts with prominent whiskers, but with wide variation in these broad traits. Some murids have elongated legs and feet to allow them to move with a hopping motion, while others have broad feet and prehensile tails to improve their climbing ability, and yet others have neither adaptation. They are most commonly some shade of brown in color, although many have black, grey, or white markings.

Murids generally have excellent senses of hearing and smell. They live in a wide range of habitats from forest to grassland, and mountain ranges. A number of species, especially the gerbils, are adapted to desert conditions and can survive for a long time with minimal water. They consume a wide range of foods depending on the species, with the aid of powerful jaw muscles and gnawing incisors that grow throughout life. The dental formula of murids is 1.0.0.1-31.0.0.1-3.

Murids breed frequently, often producing large litters several times per year. They typically give birth between twenty and forty days after mating, although this varies greatly between species. The young are typically born blind, hairless, and helpless, although exceptions occur, such as in spiny mice.

== Evolution ==
As with many other small mammals, the evolution of the murids is not well known, as few fossils survive. They probably evolved from hamster-like animals in tropical Asia some time in the early Miocene, and have only subsequently produced species capable of surviving in cooler climates. They have become especially common worldwide during the current geological epoch, as a result of hitching a ride commensally with human migrations.

== Classification ==
The murids are classified in five subfamilies, around 150 genera, and about 834 species.

=== Subfamilies ===
- Deomyinae (spiny mice, brush furred mice, link rat)
- Gerbillinae (gerbils, jirds and sand rats)
- Leimacomyinae (Togo mouse)
- Lophiomyinae (maned rat or crested rat)
- Murinae (Old World rats and mice, including vlei rats)

== In literature ==
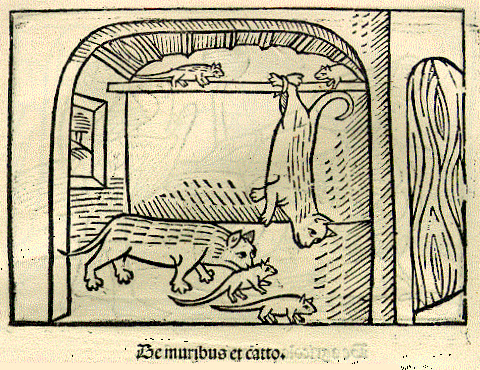
A print showing cats and mice from a 1501 German edition of Aesop's fables

Murids feature in literature, including folk tales and fairy stories. Among Aesop's Fables are The Cat and the Mice and The Frog and the Mouse. In the Pied Piper of Hamelin, retold in many versions since the 14th century, including one by the Brothers Grimm, a rat-catcher lures the town's rats into the river, but the mayor refuses to pay him. In revenge, the rat-catcher lures away all the children of the town, never to return. Mice feature in some of Beatrix Potter's small books, including The Tale of Two Bad Mice (1904), The Tale of Mrs Tittlemouse (1910), The Tale of Johnny Town-Mouse (1918), and The Tailor of Gloucester (1903), which last was described by J. R. R. Tolkien as perhaps the nearest to his idea of a fairy story, the rest being "beast-fables". The Redwall series of Brian Jacques detail the quests of mice and other woodland species. In James Herbert's first novel, The Rats, (1974), a vagrant is attacked and eaten alive by a pack of giant rats; further attacks follow.
