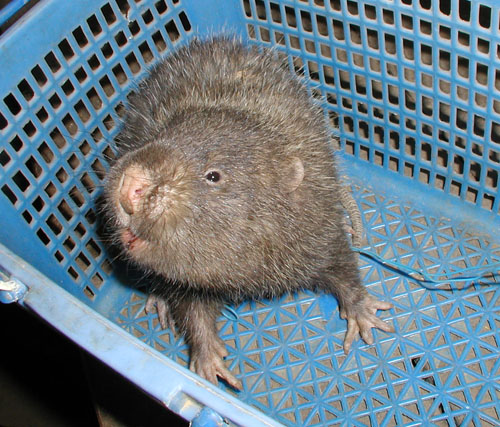
- Lesser bamboo rat, Cannomys badius

Scientific classification
- Kingdom: Animalia
- Phylum: Chordata
- Class: Mammalia
- Order: Rodentia
- Family: Spalacidae
- Subfamily: Rhizomyinae
- Tribe: Rhizomyini; Winge, 1887

Species
- Genus Rhizomys; Rhizomys sinensis; Rhizomys pruinosus; Rhizomys sumatrensis; Genus Cannomys; Cannomys badius

= Bamboo rat =

Bamboo rats Temporal range: Late Miocene - recent

Tribe of rodents

The bamboo rats are four species of rodents of the subfamily Rhizomyinae. They are the sole living representatives of the tribe Rhizomyini. These species are found in South Asia, Southeast Asia and East Asia.

The species are:

- The Chinese bamboo rat, Rhizomys sinensis, found in central and southern China, northern Burma, and Vietnam;
- The hoary bamboo rat, R. pruinosus, found from Assam in India to southeastern China and the Malay Peninsula;
- The Sumatra, Indomalayan,' or large bamboo rat, R. sumatrensis, found in Yunnan in China, Indochina, the Malay Peninsula and Sumatra.
- The lesser bamboo rat, Cannomys badius, found in Nepal, Assam, northern Bangladesh, Burma, Thailand, Laos, Cambodia and northern Vietnam.

Bamboo rats vary in size, from the lesser bamboo rat, which is typically 15 to 25 cm (5.9 to 9.8 in) long (head and body: tail length is 6–8 cm (2.4–3.1 in), and weighs from 500 to 750 g (18 to 26 oz), to the Sumatra bamboo rat, which can reach lengths of nearly 50 cm (20 in) with a 20 cm (7.9 in) tail, and weighs up to 4 kg (8.8 lb). However, they are all bulky, slow-moving rodents that live and forage in extensive burrow systems and rarely spend much time above ground. They feed on the underground parts of plants. They live at altitudes of 1,200 to 4,000 m (3,900 to 13,100 ft) and, except for the lesser bamboo rat, feed principally on bamboo and live in dense bamboo thickets. Bamboo rats go through three stages when eating bamboo. The initial phase is the quick motion of the bamboo entering the rat’s mouth. The intermediate phase is the movement of the teeth chewing the bamboo and the final stage is the state of the rats’ teeth right after eating the bamboo. The lesser bamboo rat is more variable in its habitat, living in grassy areas, forests, and sometimes gardens, and eats a wider variety of vegetation.

All bamboo rats are regarded as agricultural pests since they eat the roots of a range of crop plants such as tapioca, sugar cane, and tea bushes, but they are also recognised as valuable food animals.

The bamboo rats are the natural hosts for the disease-causing mold, Talaromyces marneffei, which is endemic in all species in Southeast Asia. In this area, talaromycosis due to the mold is the third most common opportunistic infection in HIV-positive individuals.
