= Talaromyces marneffei =

Scientific classification
- Kingdom: Fungi
- Division: Ascomycota
- Class: Eurotiomycetes
- Order: Eurotiales
- Family: Trichocomaceae
- Genus: Talaromyces
- Species: T. marneffei

Binomial name
- Talaromyces marneffei Segretain

Species of fungus

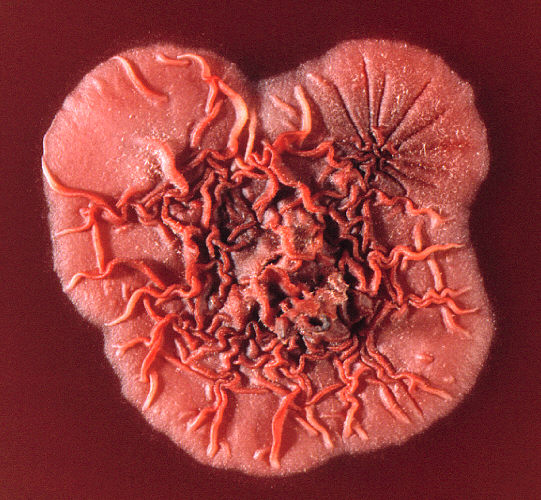
The surface of a Talaromyces (formerly Penicillium) marneffei colony.

Talaromyces marneffei, formerly called Penicillium marneffei, was identified in 1956. The organism is endemic to southeast Asia, where it is an important cause of opportunistic infections in those with HIV/AIDS-related immunodeficiency. Incidence of T. marneffei infections has increased due to a rise in HIV infection rates in the region.

When it was classified as a Penicillium, it was the only known thermally dimorphic species of that genus that caused a lethal systemic infection (talaromycosis), with fever and anaemia similar to disseminated cryptococcosis. This contrasted with related Penicillium species that are usually regarded as unimportant in terms of causing human disease.

== Taxonomy and history ==
The genus name Talaromyces is derived from the Greek words tálaros (basket) and múkēs (mushroom), which describe the ascocarp, in which asci are formed. In 1959, Segretain proposed the species name marneffei in honor of Hubert Marneffe, the director of the Pasteur Institute of Indochina.

== Epidemiology ==
There is a high incidence of talaromycosis in AIDS patients in SE Asia; 10% of patients in Hong Kong get talaromycosis as an AIDS-related illness. Cases of T. marneffei human infections (talaromycosis) have also been reported in HIV-positive patients in Australia, Europe, Japan, the UK and the U.S. All the patients, except one, had visited Southeast Asia previously. The disease is considered an AIDS-defining illness.

Discovered in bamboo rats (Rhizomys) in Vietnam, it is associated with these rats and the tropical Southeast Asia area. Talaromyces marneffei is endemic in Myanmar (Burma), Cambodia, Southern China, Indonesia, Laos, Malaysia, Thailand and Vietnam.

Although both the immunocompetent and the immunocompromised can be infected, it is extremely rare to find systemic infections in HIV-negative patients. The incidence of T. marneffei is increasing as HIV spreads throughout Asia. An increase in global travel and migration means it will be of increased importance as an infection in AIDS sufferers.

Talaromyces marneffei has been found in bamboo rat faeces, liver, lungs and spleen. It has been suggested that these animals serve as a reservoir for the fungus. It is not clear whether the rats are affected by T. marneffei or are merely asymptomatic carriers of the disease.

One study of 550 AIDS patients showed that the incidence was higher during the rainy season, which is when the rats breed. But this season also has conditions that are more favorable for production of fungal spores (conidia), which can become airborne and be inhaled by susceptible individuals.

Another study could not establish contact with bamboo rats as a risk factor, but exposure to the soil was the critical risk factor. However, soil samples failed to yield much of the fungus.

It is not known whether people get the disease by eating infected rats, or by inhaling fungi from their faeces.

One HIV-positive physician is known to have been infected while attending a course on tropical microbiology. He did not handle the organism, though students in the same laboratory did. It is presumed he contracted the infection by inhaling aerosol containing T. marneffei conidia. This shows that airborne infections are possible.

== Clinical presentation ==
Patients commonly present with symptoms and signs of infection of the reticuloendothelial system, including generalized lymphadenopathy, hepatomegaly, and splenomegaly. The respiratory system is commonly involved as well; cough, fever, dyspnea, and chest pain may be present, reflecting the probable inhalational route of acquisition. Approximately one-third of patients may also exhibit gastrointestinal symptoms, such as diarrhea.

== Laboratory diagnosis ==
The fact that Talaromyces marneffei is thermally dimorphic is a relevant clue when trying to identify it. However, it should be kept in mind that other human-pathogenic fungi are thermally dimorphic as well. Cultures should be done from bone marrow, skin, blood and sputum samples.

Plating samples out onto two Sabouraud agar plates, then incubating one at 30 °C and the other at 37 °C, should result in two different morphologies. A mold-form will grow at 30 °C, and a yeast-form at 37 °C.

Mycelial colonies will be visible on the 30 °C plate after two days. Growth is initially fluffy and white and eventually turns green and granular after sporulation has occurred. A soluble red pigment is produced, which diffuses into the agar, causing the reverse side of the plate to appear red or pink. The periphery of the mold may appear orange-coloured, and radial sulcate folds will develop.

Under the microscope, the mold phase will look like a typical Penicillium, with hyaline, septate and branched hyphae; the conidiophores are located both laterally and terminally. Each conidiophore gives rise to three to five phialides, where chains of lemon-shaped conidia are formed.

On the 37 °C plate, the colonies grow as yeasts. These colonies can be cerebriform, convoluted, or smooth. There is a decreased production in pigment, the colonies appearing cream/light-tan/light-pink in colour. Microscopically, sausage-shaped cells are mixed with hyphae-like structures. As the culture ages, segments begin to form. The cells divide by binary fission, rather than budding. The cells are not yeast cells, but rather arthroconidia. Culturing isn't the only method of diagnosis. A skin scraping can be prepared, and stained with Wright's stain. Many intracellular and extracellular yeast cells with crosswalls are suggestive of T. marneffei infection. Smears from bone marrow aspirates may also be taken; this is regarded as the most sensitive method. These samples can be stained with the Giemsa stain. Histological examination can also be done on skin, bone marrow or lymph nodes.

The patient's history also is a diagnostic help. If they have traveled to Southeast Asia and are HIV-positive, then there is an increased risk of them having talaromycosis.

Antigen testing of urine and serum, and PCR amplification of specific nucleotide sequences have been tried, with high sensitivity and specificity. Rapid identification of talaromycosis is sought, as prompt treatment is critical. Treatment should be provided as soon as talaromycosis is suspected.

== Treatment ==
Treatment of talaromycosis depends on the degree of immunosuppression and organ involvement, but most isolates of Talaromyces marneffei display low MIC's to amphotericin B as well as itraconazole, posaconazole and voriconazole.

== Research ==
=== Sexual reproduction ===
T. marneffei had been assumed to reproduce exclusively by asexual means based on the highly clonal population structure of this species. However, studies by Henk et al. (2012) revealed that the genes required for meiosis are present in T. marneffei. In addition, they obtained evidence for mating and genetic recombination in this species. Henk et al. concluded that T. marneffei is sexually reproducing, but recombination in natural populations is most likely to occur across spatially and genetically limited distances resulting in a highly clonal population structure. It appears that sex can be maintained in this species even though very little genetic variability is produced.

=== Mycovirology ===
The study by Lau et al (2018) described the first evidence of a mycovirus in a thermally dimorphic fungus. Talaromyces marneffei partitivirus-1 (TmPV1), a dsRNA mycovirus, was detected in 12.7% (7 out of 55) of clinical T. marneffei isolates. Phylogenetic analysis showed that TmPV1 occupied a distinct clade among the members of the genus Gammapartitivirus. Two virus-free isolates were successfully infected by purified TmPV1 using protoplast transfection. Mice challenged with TmPV1-infected T. marneffei isolates showed significantly shortened survival time and higher fungal burden in organs than mice challenged with isogenic TmPV1-free isolates. Transcriptomic analysis showed that TmPV1 causes aberrant expression of various genes in T. marneffei, with upregulation of potential virulence factors and suppression of RNA interference (RNAi)-related genes.

=== MicroRNA-like RNAs ===
Talaromyces marneffei dicer-dependent microRNA-like RNAs (milRNAs) were identified and these milRNAs were found to be differentially expressed in different growth phases of T. marneffei. Furthermore, the phylogeny of RNAi genes of T. marneffei were also described in the same study. Phylogenetic analysis of both ITS and dcl-1 gene showed that the corresponding sequences in T. marneffei were most closely related to Penicillium emmonsii, Penicillium chrysogenum and Aspergillus spp. However, phylogenetic analysis of dcl-2 and qde-2 genes showed a different evolutionary topology. The dcl-2 of T. marneffei and its homologue in T. stipitatus are more closely related to those of the thermal dimorphic pathogenic fungi, Histoplasma capsulatum, Blastomyces dermatitidis, Paracoccidioides brasiliensis and Coccidioides immitis than to P. chrysogenum and Aspergillus spp., suggesting the co-evolution of dcl-2 among the thermal dimorphic fungi. On the other hand, qde-2 of T. marneffei is most closely related to its homologues in other thermal dimorphic fungi than to that in T. stipitatus, P. chrysogenum and Aspergillus spp.
