= Scavenger endothelial cell =

Specialized sub-group of endothelial cells

The term scavenger endothelial cell (SEC) was initially coined to describe a specialized sub-group of endothelial cells in vertebrates that express a remarkably high blood clearance activity. The term SEC has now been adopted by several scientists.

== In vertebrates ==
The term "scavenger endothelial cell", first appearing in the scientific literature in 1999, was coined to distinguish a highly specialized subclass of endothelium in vertebrates that was observed to express a remarkably avid blood clearance activity. Blood borne waste macromolecules are known to be efficiently cleared from the blood circulation via scavenger receptors (stabilin-1, stabilin-2), the mannose receptor, and the Fc gamma receptor IIb2 of the mammalian liver sinusoidal endothelial cells. Ligands that are efficiently cleared from blood by receptor-mediated endocytosis in liver sinusoidal endothelial cells in mammals, are also avidly cleared by liver sinusoidal endothelial cells in birds, reptiles and amphibia, as in mammals. However, in bony fish (teleosts) the same macromolecules accumulate in either heart endocardium (e.g. in the Atlantic cod) or kidney sinusoids (e.g. in carp and salmonid fishes), but not in liver. Furthermore, in animal species of phylogenetically older vertebrate classes, i.e. cartilaginous (e.g. ray) and jawless (lamprey and hagfish) fishes, only specialized endothelial cells in gills exhibit the same active blood clearance capability as observed in liver sinusoidal endothelial cells in the four land-based vertebrate classes. In all these cases the clearance cells are not macrophages, but a special type of endothelial cells that have been named scavenger endothelial cells to distinguish them functionally from other types of vertebrate endothelia. Recently it was shown that the endothelial cells in the caudal vein plexus of the embryonic zebrafish, also exhibit characteristic scavenger functions. These SECs, but not macrophages, avidly and preferentially clear colloidal waste and viral particles, as well as endogenous exosomes that are specifically internalized in a dynamin- and scavenger receptor dependent pathway to be targeted to lysosomes for degradation. Anionic nanoparticles are primarily taken up by these zebrafish SECs by the scavenger receptor, stabilin-2 in this process, which is also a signature scavenger receptor of mammalian liver sinusoidal endothelial cells.

== Analogues in invertebrates ==
Although true endothelial cells are only found in vertebrates, insect hemocytes and nephrocytes have similar scavenger functions to vertebrate macrophages and SECs, sharing the task of waste clearance and defense against foreign intruders. Colloidal vital dyes, such as ammonia carmine and trypan blue, are rapidly and preferentially taken up by insect pericardial and garland nephrocytes. Nephrocytes, but not hemocytes of the common blow fly (Calliphora) avidly endocytose and degrade ligands that are also recognized by stabilin-2 of mammalian scavenger endothelial cells. In Drosophila, nephrocytes remove microbiota-derived peptidoglycan from systemic circulation to maintain immune homeostasis. Nephrocytes that strongly resemble insect nephrocytes are found in several other major invertebrate classes.

== Dual-cell principle of waste clearance ==
It appears that the major scavenger cell systems of vertebrates and invertebrates are based on a dual-cell principle of waste clearance. In vertebrates, distinct populations of scavenger endothelial cells represent the professional pinocyte, clearing the blood of a wide range of soluble macromolecules and small particles (<200 nm) by clathrin-mediated endocytosis, while the macrophage represents the professional phagocyte, eliminating larger particles (>200 nm).

== See also ==
- Endothelial cell
- Invertebrates
- Reticuloendothelial system
- Vertebrates
