= Alanine aminotransferase 1 =

Enzyme found in humans

GPT

Identifiers
- Aliases: GPT, AAT1, ALT1, GPT1, glutamic--pyruvic transaminase
- External IDs: OMIM: 138200; MGI: 95802; GeneCards: GPT
Enzyme activity
EC #	BRENDA	ExPASy	KEGG	MetaCyc
2.6.1.2	↗	↗	↗	↗

Gene location (Human)
Chr.	Chromosome 8 (human)
Band	8q24.3	Start	144,502,973 bp
Band	8q24.3	End	144,507,174 bp

Gene location (Mouse)
Chr.	Chromosome 15 (mouse)
Band	15 D3|15 36.28 cM	Start	76,579,916 bp
Band	15 D3|15 36.28 cM	End	76,583,886 bp
RNA expression pattern
Bgee	Human / Mouse (ortholog); Top expressed in: right lobe of liver; mucosa of transverse colon; apex of heart; testicle; muscle of thigh; pancreatic ductal cell; left ventricle; gastrocnemius muscle; body of stomach; right hemisphere of cerebellum / Top expressed in: left lobe of liver; interventricular septum; duodenum; jejunum; intestinal villus; saccule; otic vesicle; brown adipose tissue; white adipose tissue; epithelium of stomach; More reference expression data
BioGPS	n/a
Gene ontology
Molecular function	transferase activity; L-alanine:2-oxoglutarate aminotransferase activity; pyridoxal phosphate binding; catalytic activity; transaminase activity
Cellular component	cytoplasm; cytosol; extracellular exosome; extracellular space
Biological process	L-alanine catabolic process; cellular amino acid biosynthetic process; biosynthetic process
Sources:Amigo / QuickGO
Orthologs
Databases	NCBI: entry; OMA: entry
Species	Human	Mouse
Entrez	2875	76282
Ensembl	ENSG00000167701	ENSMUSG00000022546
UniProt	P24298	Q8QZR5
RefSeq (mRNA)	NM_005309	NM_182805
RefSeq (protein)	NP_005300; NP_001369593; NP_001369594	NP_877957
Location (UCSC)	Chr 8: 144.5 – 144.51 Mb	Chr 15: 76.58 – 76.58 Mb
PubMed search
- Wikidata
View/Edit Human	View/Edit Mouse

Alanine aminotransferase 1, also ambiguously called Glutamate—pyruvate transaminase, is an enzyme that in humans is encoded by the GPT gene. This enzyme is a type of alanine aminotransferase involved in production of glucose in the body (gluconeogenesis) and the metabolism of amino acids. This form of alanine aminotransferase is found in the cytoplasm of the cell and highly expressed in the liver, which differs from alanine aminotransferase 2 which is found in the mitochondria.

== Function ==
As an alanine aminotransferase, this enzyme catalyses the following reaction:

L-alanine + 2-oxoglutarate = pyruvate + L-glutamate
