= Liver sinusoidal endothelial cell =

Blood vessel lining

Details
- System: Circulatory system
- Location: blood vessels of liver

Liver sinusoidal endothelial cells (LSECs) form the lining of the smallest blood vessels in the liver, also called the hepatic sinusoids. LSECs are highly specialized endothelial cells with characteristic morphology and function. They constitute an important part of the reticuloendothelial system (RES).

== Structure ==
Although the LSECs make up only about 3% of the total liver cell volume, their surface in a normal adult human liver is about 210 m^{2}, or nearly the size of a tennis court.

The LSEC structure differs from other endothelia. The cells contain many open pores, or fenestrae, with diameters from 100 to 150 nm. The fenestrae occupy 20% of the LSEC surface and are arranged in groups referred to as "sieve plates". Filtering fluid between the sinusoidal lumen and the space of Disse, the fenestrae are crucial for lipoprotein traffic between the hepatocytes and the sinusoidal lumen. The LSECs lack an organized basal lamina. The LSECs contain 45% and 17% of the liver's total mass of pinocytic vesicles and lysosomes, and contain twice as many clathrin-coated pits per membrane unit, compared with two other major liver cells, Kupffer cells and hepatocytes, reflecting the high capacity clathrin-mediated endocytic activity of LSECs.

== Physiological functions ==
LSECs play a central role in the clearance of blood borne waste. The cells express endocytosis receptors that mediate extremely rapid internalization of waste molecules. In rat it has been shown that LSECs express scavenger receptors (SR) class A, B, E and H. The latter exists as stabilin-1 (SR-H1) and stabilin-2 (SR-H2) in LSECs. In the liver stabilin-2, the most important SR on LSECs, is uniquely expressed in these cells. Moreover, LSECs also express high levels of the macrophage mannose receptor (MMR) and the Fc-gamma receptor IIb2 (FcγRIIb2), both highly active in clathrin-mediated endocytosis just like the two stabilins. Other important receptors on LSECs are L-SIGN (liver/lymph node-specific ICAM-3 grabbing nonintegrin), LSECtin (liver and lymph node sinusoidal endothelial cell C-type lectin), Lyve-1 (lymphatic vessel endothelial hyaluronan receptor‐1), and LRP‐1 (low‐density lipoprotein receptor‐related protein‐1).

The capacity of LSECs as scavengers of blood borne waste assigns an important role of these cells in innate immunity. The abundant expression of receptors such as the endocytic FcγRIIb2 and pattern recognition receptors (PRRs) i.e. toll like receptors (TLRs), MMR and SRs, as well as the high expression of inflammasome molecules NLRP-1, NLRP-3, and AIM2 point to innate immune functions of LSECs. In addition, LSECs display features of adaptive immunity, contributing to hepatic immune tolerance.

== Pathobiology ==
=== Liver fibrosis ===
LSECs have been reported to play a role in the development of liver fibrosis. Liver fibrosis is associated with decreased LSEC fenestration, and appearance of an organized basal lamina in the space of Disse, a process called capillarization, which precedes the onset of liver fibrosis. Normally differentiated LSECs prevent hepatic stellate cell activation and promote reversion to quiescence, whereas capillarized LSECs do not.

=== Atherosclerosis ===
Chylomicrons produced by the intestinal epithelial cells from dietary lipids have diameter up to 1000 nm which prevents them from passing through the LSEC fenestrae. The size of circulating chylomicrons is gradually reduced to chylomicron remnants by lipoprotein lipase on endothelial cells of systemic capillaries. When the chylomicron remnants become small enough (30–80 nm), they pass through the LSEC fenestrations, leading to their metabolism in hepatocytes. Reduced porosity, as in liver cirrhosis, diabetes mellitus or old age may lead to prolonged postprandial lipoproteinemia and increased circulatory cholesterol levels, with increased risk for development of atherosclerosis.

=== Autoimmunity ===
It has been suggested that reduced Fc receptor function in humans, causing increased circulating levels of soluble immune complexes is important in the etiology of autoimmune diseases such as systemic lupus erythematosus (SLE) and Sjögren's syndrome. Moreover, the observation that small soluble IgG-antigen immune complexes are cleared in the mouse mainly via the LSEC FcγRIIb2 (8), along with the observation that deletion of same receptor causes spontaneous auto-immunity and SLE-like disease in mice, point to a pivotal role of LSEC FcγRIIb2 in the disease mechanism of SLE. Furthermore, the finding that scavenging of blood borne DNAs is chiefly by SR-mediated uptake in LSECs, along with the fact that SLE is associated with generation of anti-DNA antibody, lend additional support to the hypothesis that LSECs participate in the onset of SLE.

== Liver toxicology ==
LSECs may sometimes be the initial target of injury in a condition referred to as sinusoidal obstruction syndrome (SOS, formerly hepatic veno-occlusive disease, VOD), which is described as a change of the sinusoid that may lead to hepatocyte hypoxia, with liver dysfunction and disruption of the portal circulation. Major causes of SOS are dietary ingestion of pyrrolizidine alkaloids, treatment with several chemotherapeutic drugs, and acetaminophen. Moreover, since LSECs are geared to (generally unwanted) active blood clearance of large molecule compounds and nano formulations (7) these cells may be easily intoxicated by off-target mechanisms, causing subsequent hepatotoxicity.

== Origin and renewal ==
Normal LSEC turnover is maintained by the liver resident population of LSEC progenitor cells; in addition, recruitment of bone marrow derived cells contributes to replenish the LSEC population when needed.

== History ==
By the end of the 19th and beginning of the 20th centuries researchers observed avid accumulation of intravenously administered colloidal vital dyes in cells lining the sinusoids of some tissues, with the highest uptake in the littoral cells of the hepatic sinusoids. These very active blood clearance cells were collectively named "The reticuloendothelial system", or RES. For several decades it was believed that the cells comprising the RES were the macrophages of the mononuclear phagocyte system (MPS). Hence the hepatic clearance of circulating waste was attributed to the liver macrophages, or Kupffer cells. However, by a recent re-investigation of the original vital stain experiments carried out 100–140 years ago it was concluded that the vital stain accumulated mainly in LSECs. It is increasingly accepted that LSECs and Kupffer cells play complementary roles in the hepatic blood clearance process, referred to as the dual cell principle of waste clearance (6): LSECs clear macromolecules and nanoparticles roughly <200 nm by clathrin-mediated endocytosis whereas Kupffer cells clear larger particles >200 nm by phagocytosis.

== In a comparative context ==
All vertebrates carry a population of endothelial cells that are remarkably active in blood clearance of macromolecules and nano-substances. The great majority of these cells are located in the liver sinusoids of land-based vertebrates (mammals, birds, reptiles and amphibia). However, in bony fishes, these specialized endothelial cells are located either in the heart endocardium or in endothelial cells of the kidney sinusoidal lining, depending on the fish species. In cartilaginous fishes and the jawless fishes, these endothelial cells constitute the lining of the gill capillaries. The name scavenger endothelial cells (SECs) has been coined to denote the endothelial cells in vertebrates that are geared to blood clearance. Thus, LSECs in mammals and other land-based vertebrates are a member of the vertebrate SEC family.

== See also ==
- Reticuloendothelial system
