= WHO Disease Staging System for HIV Infection and Disease in Children =

Medical classification for HIV/AIDS

The current staging system for HIV infection in children was developed in 2005 and builds upon the staging system in place since 1987. A child is defined as someone under the age of 15. This staging system also requires the presence of HIV infection: HIV antibody for children aged 18 months or more; virological or p24 antigen positive test if aged under 18 months.

== Clinical Stage 1 ==
- Asymptomatic
- Persistent generalized lymphadenopathy

== Clinical Stage 2 ==
- Hepatosplenomegaly
- Papular pruritic eruptions
- Seborrhoeic dermatitis
- Extensive human papillomavirus infection
- Extensive molluscum contagiosum
- Fungal nail infections
- Recurrent oral ulcerations
- Lineal gingival erythema (LGE)
- Angular cheilitis
- Parotid enlargement
- Herpes zoster
- Recurrent or chronic RTIs (otitis media, otorrhoea, sinusitis)

== Clinical Stage 3 ==
Conditions where a presumptive diagnosis can be made on the basis of clinical signs or simple investigations:

- Moderate unexplained malnutrition not adequately responding to standard therapy
- Unexplained persistent diarrhoea (14 days or more)
- Unexplained persistent fever (intermittent or constant, for longer than one month)
- Oral candidiasis (outside neonatal period)
- Oral hairy leukoplakia
- Acute necrotizing ulcerative gingivitis/periodontitis
- Pulmonary TB
- Severe recurrent presumed bacterial pneumonia

Conditions where confirmatory diagnostic testing is necessary:

- Chronic HIV-associated lung disease including bronchiectasis
- Lymphoid interstitial pneumonitis (LIP)
- Unexplained anaemia (<80g/L), and or neutropenia (<1000/μL) and or thrombocytopenia (<50 000/μL) for more than one month

== Clinical Stage 4 ==
Conditions where a presumptive diagnosis can be made based on clinical signs or simple investigations:

- Unexplained severe wasting or severe malnutrition not adequately responding to standard therapy
- Pneumocystis jirovecii pneumonia
- Recurrent severe presumed bacterial infections (e.g. empyema, pyomyositis, bone or joint infection, meningitis, but excluding pneumonia)
- Chronic herpes simplex infection; (orolabial or cutaneous of more than one month's duration)
- Extrapulmonary Tuberculosis
- Kaposi’s sarcoma
- Oesophageal candidiasis
- Central nervous system toxoplasmosis (outside the neonatal period)
- HIV encephalopathy

The presumptive criteria are designed for use where access to confirmatory diagnostic testing for HIV infection by means of virological testing (usually nucleic acid testing, NAT) or P24 antigen testing for infants and children aged under 18 months is not readily available.

Conditions where confirmatory diagnostic testing is necessary:

- HCMV infection (CMV retinitis or infection of organs other than liver, spleen, or lymph nodes; onset at age one month or more)
- Extrapulmonary cryptococcosis including meningitis
- Any disseminated endemic mycosis (e.g. extrapulmonary histoplasmosis, coccidioidomycosis, penicilliosis)
- Cryptosporidiosis
- Isosporiasis
- Disseminated non-tuberculous mycobacteria infection
- Candida of trachea, bronchi or lungs
- Visceral herpes simplex infection
- Acquired HIV-associated rectal fistula
- Cerebral or B cell non-Hodgkin lymphoma
- Progressive multifocal leukoencephalopathy (PML)
- HIV-associated cardiomyopathy or HIV-associated nephropathy
