= Chitinase domain-containing protein 1 =

Protein found in humans

CHID1

Identifiers
- Aliases: CHID1, SI-CLP, SICLP, GL008, chitinase domain containing 1
- External IDs: OMIM: 615692; MGI: 1915288; GeneCards: CHID1
Available structures
PDB	Ortholog search: PDBe RCSB
PDB	List of PDB id codes 3BXW

Gene location (Human)
Chr.	Chromosome 11 (human)
Band	11p15.5	Start	867,859 bp
Band	11p15.5	End	915,058 bp

Gene location (Mouse)
Chr.	Chromosome 7 (mouse)
Band	7|7 F5	Start	141,073,049 bp
Band	7|7 F5	End	141,119,770 bp
RNA expression pattern
Bgee	Human / Mouse (ortholog); Top expressed in: stromal cell of endometrium; body of pancreas; right testis; left testis; right lobe of liver; anterior pituitary; right adrenal cortex; islet of Langerhans; right uterine tube; left adrenal gland / Top expressed in: spermatid; spermatocyte; dentate gyrus of hippocampal formation granule cell; seminal vesicula; yolk sac; lacrimal gland; islet of Langerhans; lens; right kidney; epithelium of stomach; More reference expression data
BioGPS	n/a
Gene ontology
Molecular function	protein binding; oligosaccharide binding; chitinase activity; chitin binding
Cellular component	late endosome; trans-Golgi network; extracellular exosome; membrane; nucleus; lysosome; extracellular region; extracellular space; lysosomal lumen
Biological process	innate immune response; negative regulation of cytokine production involved in inflammatory response; immune system process; platelet degranulation; chitin catabolic process; carbohydrate metabolic process
Sources:Amigo / QuickGO
Orthologs
Databases	NCBI: entry; OMA: entry
Species	Human	Mouse
Entrez	66005	68038
Ensembl	ENSG00000177830	ENSMUSG00000025512
UniProt	Q9BWS9	Q922Q9
RefSeq (mRNA)	NM_001142674; NM_001142675; NM_001142676; NM_001142677; NM_023947	NM_001142681; NM_026522; NM_001369350; NM_001369351; NM_001369352
RefSeq (protein)	NP_001136146; NP_001136147; NP_001136148; NP_001136149; NP_076436	NP_001136153; NP_080798; NP_001356279; NP_001356280; NP_001356281
Location (UCSC)	Chr 11: 0.87 – 0.92 Mb	Chr 7: 141.07 – 141.12 Mb
PubMed search
- Wikidata
View/Edit Human	View/Edit Mouse

Chitinase domain-containing protein 1 (CHID1) is a protein of unknown function encoded by the highly conserved gene CHID1, which is located on the short (p) arm of chromosome 11 near the telomere. The protein has 27 introns, which allows for many isoforms of this gene. It has several aliases, the most common of which is Stabilin-1 interacting chitinase-like protein (SI-CLP). As indicated by the alias, CHID1 is known to interact with the protein STAB1. CHID1 is expressed ubiquitously at levels nearly 6 times the average gene, and is conserved very far back to organisms such as Caenorhabditis elegans and possibly some prokaryotes. This protein is known to have carbohydrate binding sites, which could be involved in carbohydrate catabolysis.

== Gene ==
CHID1 is located on chromosome 11 at the location p15.5. It is just downstream of TSPAN4 and upstream of AP2A2. CHID1 is ubiquitously expressed at a high levels. Through microarray analysis, it has been shown that CHID1 is generally expressed at 5.7 times the average gene. CHID1 has many known variants, which is attributed to its 37 exons. There are no inherent repeats or hairpin structures to be found within the coding region of CHID1. This gene is a member of the GH18 superfamily, which dictates some of its protein structure. This gene also has several aliases, the most common of which is Stabilin-1 interacting chitinase-like protein, or SI-CLP, which indicates its known interaction with STAB1.

=== Variations ===
Due to its large size and many exons, CHID1 has many transcript variants that have been identified through mRNA sequencing. CHID1 has 27 exons and 22 known splice forms. These forms indicate that there may be multiple promotor regions and transcription start sites used within the genome. The most commonly found transcripts translate to about 400 amino acids each.

== Homology ==
CHID1 shows a very high level of conservation. It has been identified in many model systems including Drosophila melanogaster, Caenorhabditis elegans, and Oryza sativa. When conservation is observed over a large region, it becomes clear which protein domains are most important to CHID1. By far, the two best conserved factors are exon junctions you can add a link to exon junction, as well as several known carbohydrate binding sites. Another important region appears to be the last 15 amino acids, which retain a high level of conservation even through insect sequences.

A multiple sequence alignment of several CHID1 homologs with highlighted conserved sequences and important features indicated.

Species	Common name	Divergence in millions of years	Accession number	Similarity to human sequence
Gorilla gorilla gorilla	Gorilla	8.8	XP_004050445.1	100%
Macaca mulatta	Rhesus macaque	29.0	AFI38071.1	94%
Equus caballus	Horse	94.2	XP_003362692.1	91%
Felis catus	House cat	94.2	XP_003993852.1	90%
Taeniopygia guttata	Finch	296	XP_002199280.2	78%
Ictalurus punctatus	Catfish	400.1	NP_001187344.1	70%
Apis florea	Honey bee	782.7	XP_003691984.1	61%

=== Paralogs ===
There are also several proposed paralogs to CHID1. These genes are di-N-acetylchitobiase, Chitinase-3-like protein 2, and chitotriosidase 1. All of these genes have roughly 40% similarity, and match human transcripts of CHID1 over 40-50% of the gene. Based on the level of conservation, these paralogs all likely split at a time near to the split from bacteria.

Phylogenetic tree based on the differences in various CHID1 homologs and its paralogs.

Name	Accession number	Length (amino acids)	Similarity to CHID1 in humans
di-N-acetylchitobiase	NP_004379.1	385	38%
Chitinase-3-like protein 2	NP_001020368.1	380	39%
Chitotriosidase-1	NP_001243054.2	447	40%

== Protein ==
The protein translation of CHID1 is typically about 400 amino acids long (though this varies within the many known forms), and has few post-translational modifications. In most forms and orthologs, it is predicted that CHID1 has a signal peptide that varies in length by sequence. Structure predictions and x-ray crystallography structures of CHID1 indicate that its secondary structure is heavy in alpha helices, though it definitely has some beta strands present, as indicated by the SI-CLP x-ray crystallography structure. CHID1 is also a member of the GH18 superfamily of proteins, which has a unique conserved structure. Members of this family contain an 8 stranded beta/alpha barrel. This protein is also shown to interact with other copies of itself in a homodimer, which also uses sulfate ion interacting molecules for an unknown purpose.

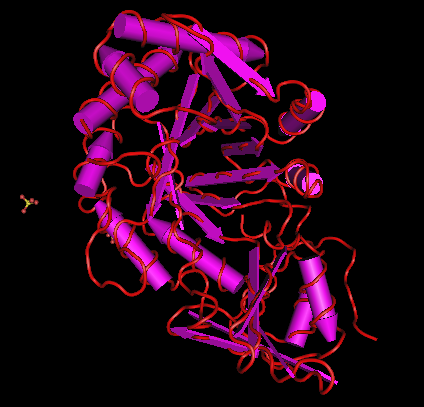
The barrel structure of CHID1 found by x-ray crystallography

== Expression ==
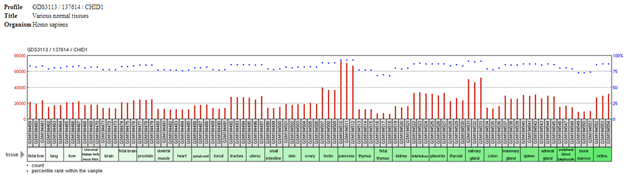
An expression profile analysis of CHID1 in normal tissues

The expression of CHID1 is consistently shown to be ubiquitous and higher than average in all human tissues. When analyzing the promoter region of CHID1 in humans, this expression is explained by the large number of transcription factor binding sites which are active in a wide range of tissues or are even ubiquitous. In Drosophila melanogaster, tissue expression varies wildly between larval and adult tissue. While expression is extremely widespread in adults, it is not at such a high level as in humans. In larvae, CHID1 is only shown to be expressed in specific tissues, and is up-regulated in very different tissues than in adults. In larval tissues, expression is highest in the salivary gland, but in adults the highest expression by far is in the male accessory gland. Though expression is generally high in some species, it is not necessarily abnormal. In situ hybridization of gene transcripts in mouse brains shows that CHID1 is expressed relatively normally. The pattern of high and low expression with the brain is very similar to another widespread gene: beta actin. This is one indication that CHID1 may show normal expression patterning in mammals, despite its general upregulation.

== Function ==
Although CHID1 has no known function for certain, there are several proposed activities of the protein based on current knowledge. This protein may participate in metabolic processes such as chitin catabolism or carbohydrate metabolism. It may locate in various cellular compartments such as the cytoplasm, or in lysosomes all depending on certain post-translational modifications. Another study proposed that CHID1 may have roles in pathogen sensing. The function of CHID1 may also depend on its putative binding partner, STAB1, which is proposed to participate in cell signaling and defense against bacterium.

== Interactions ==
CHID1 is only strongly suggested to interact with one other protein. The transmembrane protein stabilin-1 has been detected as an interactant by in vitro, in vivo, and yeast two-hybrid assays. STAB1 is a large transmembrane receptor protein which may function in many aspects such as lymphocyte homing or angiogenesis. It is expressed at over twice the average gene level and is expected to play a role in cell defense against bacterium. This interaction may give insight towards the function of both proteins as a whole.

== Clinical Significance ==
Overall, the significance of CHID1 is unknown. Many expression profiles of CHID1 show that its expression does not change in any common diseases or conditions as currently studied. Given the lack of knowledge about the function of CHID1, it is difficult to further study its role within the human condition.
