= Fasciclin 2 =

Fasciclin 2 (Fas2 or FasII) is a 95 kilodalton cell membrane glycoprotein in the immunoglobulin (Ig) – related superfamily of cell adhesion molecules (CAMs). It was first identified in the developing grasshopper embryo, seen dynamically expressed on a subset of fasciculating axons in the central nervous system (CNS), functioning as a neuronal recognition molecule in the regulation of selective axon fasciculation. Subsequently, fasII was cloned and has mainly been studied in the fruit fly (Drosophila melanogaster). Its extracellular structure consists of two Fibronectin type III domains and five Ig-like C2 domains, having structural homology to the neural cell adhesion molecule (NCAM) found in vertebrates. Alternative splicing of fasII gives rise to its expression in three major isoforms, including a membrane-associated form that is attached to the outer leaflet of the plasma membrane via a glycophosphatidylinositol (GPI anchor) linkage and two integral transmembrane forms. The larger transmembrane form has an amino acid motif contained in its cytoplasmic domain that is rich in proline, glutamic acid, serine and threonine residues (PEST sequence). The fasciclin 1 (Fas1) and fasciclin 3 (Fas3) genes in Drosophila also code for cell adhesion proteins in the nervous system but do not show any structural or functional similarities with NCAM.

FasII is initially expressed selectively localized to basolateral junctions during the process of oogenesis, where it functions to establish polarity in inner polar cells of epithelium-derived border cells. During embryogenesis, fasII is dynamically expressed on a subset of axon fascicles in longitudinal nervous system pathways, including the MP1 tract. Here, fasII (and other attractive/repulsive environmental cues such as semaphorins and other morphogens) functions as a framework for pathfinding choices of newly extending axons. This is achieved through trans-homophilic fasII-mediated adhesion and subsequent activation of downstream intracellular signaling pathways involving mitogen-activated protein kinase (MAPK) and regulation of intracellular calcium levels. Later, fasII is expressed on growth cones of axons in other tracts including embryonic peripheral nervous system (PNS) motor neurons. Only the transmembrane isoforms are expressed by neurons, while the GPI-linked form is expressed by non-neuronal cells (mainly glial cells), where it functions as a substrate for growth cones of extending axons, directing adhesion and axon guidance. FasII is also expressed by clusters of differentiating neuroblasts at early stages of neurogenesis where its function is not fully understood but might be involved in proneural gene induction.

Other roles for fasII include delineating two axonal pathways in the adult ocellar sensory system (OSS) via its expression on ocellar pioneer (OP) neurons where it acts to promote neurite outgrowth from primary neurons (along with neuroglian) by activating fibroblast growth factor receptor (FGFR) signaling. In addition, fasII has been shown to be involved in synaptic target selection, stabilization and remodeling along with several proteins such as netrins, semaphorins and other Ig-CAMs.

The human homolog is STAB2.

== See also ==
- Fasciclin domain
