= GPT2 =

GPT2 may refer to:

- the human gene expressing Glutamic--pyruvic transaminase 2
- GPT-2, a text generating model developed by OpenAI
