= HIV/AIDS in the Democratic Republic of the Congo =

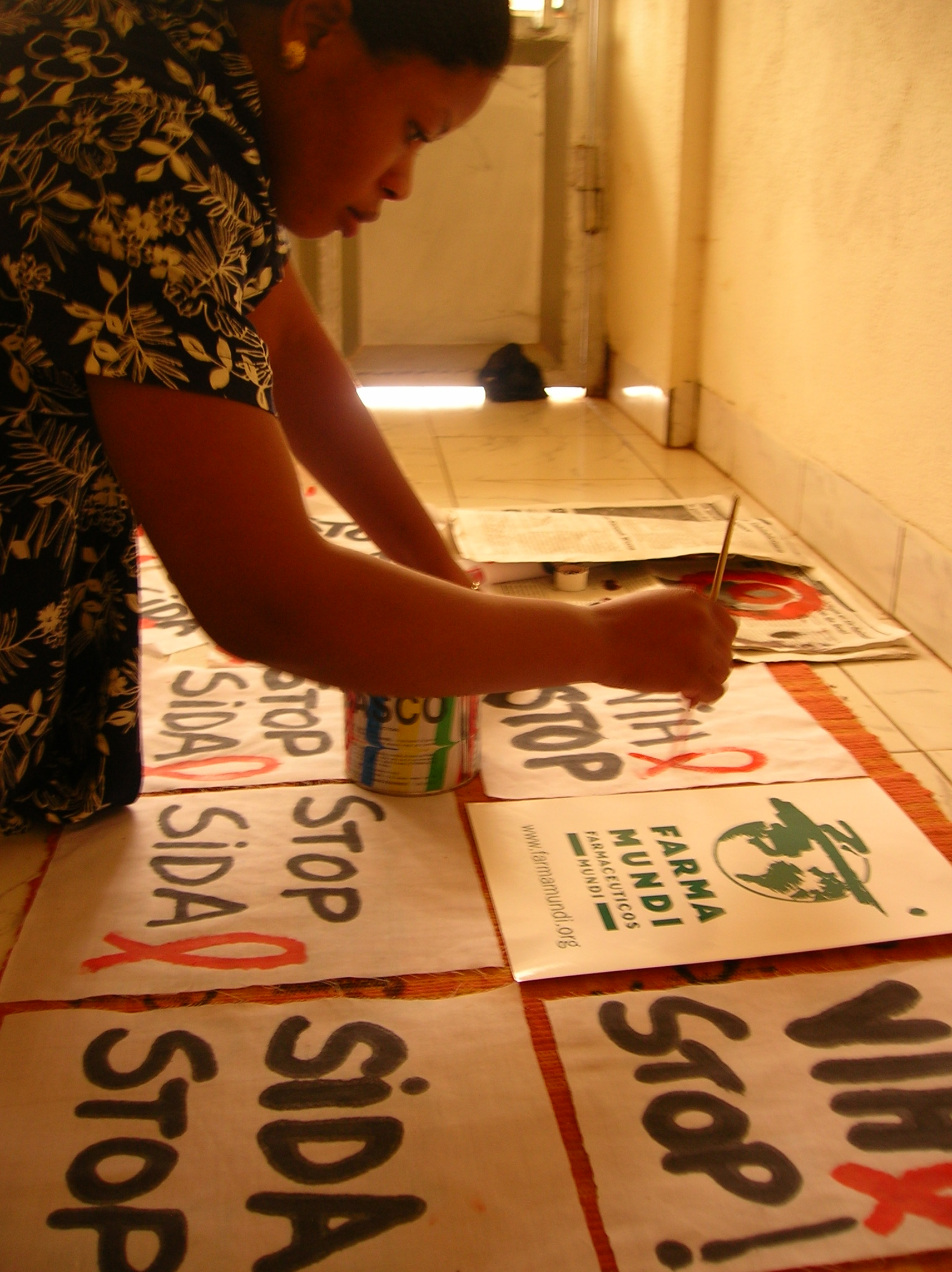
Campaign against HIV/AIDS in Butembo.

The Democratic Republic of the Congo (DR Congo) was one of the first African countries to recognize HIV, registering cases of HIV among hospital patients as early as 1983.

== Basis ==
Human immunodeficiency virus infection and acquired immune deficiency syndrome (HIV/AIDS) is a disease spectrum of the human immune system caused by infection with human immunodeficiency virus (HIV). As the infection progresses, it interferes more and more with the immune system, making the person much more susceptible to common infections like tuberculosis, as well as opportunistic infections and tumors that do not usually affect people who have working immune systems. The late symptoms of the infection are referred to as AIDS. This stage is often complicated by an infection of the lung known as pneumocystis pneumonia, severe weight loss, a type of cancer known as Kaposi's sarcoma, or other AIDS-defining conditions.

Genetic research indicates that HIV originated in west-central Africa during the late nineteenth or early twentieth century. AIDS was first recognized by the United States Centers for Disease Control and Prevention (CDC) in 1981 and its cause—HIV infection—was identified in the early part of the decade. Since its discovery, AIDS has caused an estimated 36 million deaths worldwide (as of 2012). As of 2012, approximately 35.3 million people are living with HIV globally.

A team at the University of Oxford, United Kingdom, and the University of Leuven, in Belgium, tried to reconstruct HIV's "family tree" and find out where its oldest ancestors came from. Their 2014 study indicated that HIV/AIDS pandemic originated in the Democratic Republic of Congo as a result of social circumstances and the migration of workers.

== Prevalence ==
At the end of 2001, the Joint United Nations Programme on HIV/AIDS (UNAIDS) estimated that 1.3 million Congolese (adult and children) were living with HIV/AIDS, yielding an overall HIV prevalence of 4.9%. Beyond the 5% mark, the country's epidemic will be considered "high level," or firmly established within the general population. By the end of 2003, UNAIDS estimated that 1.1 million people were living with HIV/AIDS, for an overall adult HIV prevalence of 4.2%.

The main mode of HIV transmission occurs through heterosexual activity, which is linked to 87% of cases. The most affected age groups are women aged 20 to 29 and men aged 30 to 39. Life expectancy in the DR Congo dropped 9% in the 1990s as a result of HIV/AIDS.

According to UNAIDS, several factors fuel the spread of HIV in the DR Congo, including movement of large numbers of refugees and soldiers, scarcity and high cost of safe blood transfusions in rural areas, a lack of counseling, few HIV testing sites, high levels of untreated sexually transmitted infections among sex workers and their clients, and low availability of condoms outside Kinshasa and one or two provincial capitals. With the imminent end of hostilities and a government of transition, population movements associated with increased stability and economic revitalization will exacerbate the spread of HIV, which is now localized in areas most directly affected by the presence of troops and war-displaced populations. Consecutive wars have made it nearly impossible to conduct effective and sustainable HIV/AIDS prevention activities. In addition, the HIV-tuberculosis coinfection rate ranges from 30 to 50%.

The number of Congolese women living with HIV/AIDS is growing. UNAIDS estimates indicate that, at the end of 2001, more than 60% (670,000) of 1.1 million adults aged 15–49 currently living with HIV/AIDS were women. Infection rates among pregnant women tested in 1999 in major urban areas ranged from 2.7 to 5.4%. Outside the major urban areas, 8.5% of pregnant women tested in 1999 were HIV-positive.

Between 1985 and 1997, infection rates among sex workers in Kinshasa ranged from 27 to 38%. More than one-half (58%) of the total population is under 15 years of age. The AIDS epidemic has had a disproportionate impact on children, causing high morbidity and mortality rates among infected children and orphaning many others. Approximately 30 to 40% of infants born to HIV-positive mothers will become infected with HIV. According to UNAIDS, by the end of 2001 an estimated 170,000 children under the age of 15 were living with HIV/AIDS, and 927,000 children had lost one or both parents to the disease.

In 2003 and 2004, a national HIV surveillance survey conducted jointly by the U.S. Centers for Disease Control and Prevention (CDC) and the National AIDS Control Program among pregnant women revealed an increase in HIV prevalence rates in rural and urban areas highly affected by consecutive wars, e.g., in Lodja (6.6%) and in Kisangani (6.6%).

In 2007, the first Demographic and Health Survey (DHS), a large and statistically representative study of 9,000 people, found a prevalence of 1.3% - 0.9% for men and 1.6% for women.

== Dynamics ==
=== Prostitution ===
UNAIDS reported in 2016 that there was an HIV prevalence of 5.7% amongst sex workers, compared with 0.7% amongst the general population. There is a reluctance to use condoms amongst the clients of sex workers, and will pay double the price for unprotected sex. Médecins Sans Frontières distribute condoms to sex workers and encourage their use.

== National response ==
DR Congo is emerging from years of civil conflict. In 2003, former combatants signed peace agreements, and foreign troops left the country. National elections are scheduled for 2005. Despite poor health indicators and rampant poverty—leading to its 2004 rank as one of the 10 poorest countries in the world—DR Congo was one of the first countries in Africa to recognize and address HIV/AIDS as an epidemic and one of the few in which the rate of HIV infection has remained relatively stable.

The interim DR Congo government has shown growing interest in expanding HIV/AIDS services and improving the quality of services but lacks the necessary infrastructure and resources. Therefore, HIV/AIDS activities have recently resumed, but only to a limited extent. As per the national HIV/AIDS strategic framework (1999–2008), the DR Congo government favors prevention, care, and advocacy activities that highlight community participation, human rights and ethics, and the needs of persons living with HIV/AIDS. To implement this strategy nationwide, the DR Congo government solicits participation from all development partners, including private sector, faith-based, and nongovernmental organizations (NGOs).

Internal migration, endemic poverty, widespread risk behavior, sexually transmitted infections, and lack of a safe blood supply are some of the challenges to stemming HIV/AIDS in DR Congo.

The National AIDS Control Program, chaired by the Minister of Health, was established in the early 1990s. Recently, with considerable support from the World Bank, the DR Congo is establishing a multisectoral national control program called Programme National Multisectorial de Lutte contre le SIDA. It is attached to the Office of the President and will act as the central unit for planning, coordination, and monitoring and evaluation of all HIV/AIDS/STI activities in the country. Another important opportunity offered to the DR Congo is funding from the Global Fund to Fight AIDS, Tuberculosis and Malaria.

== See also ==
- Health in the Democratic Republic of the Congo
