= Alanine transaminase =

Mammalian protein

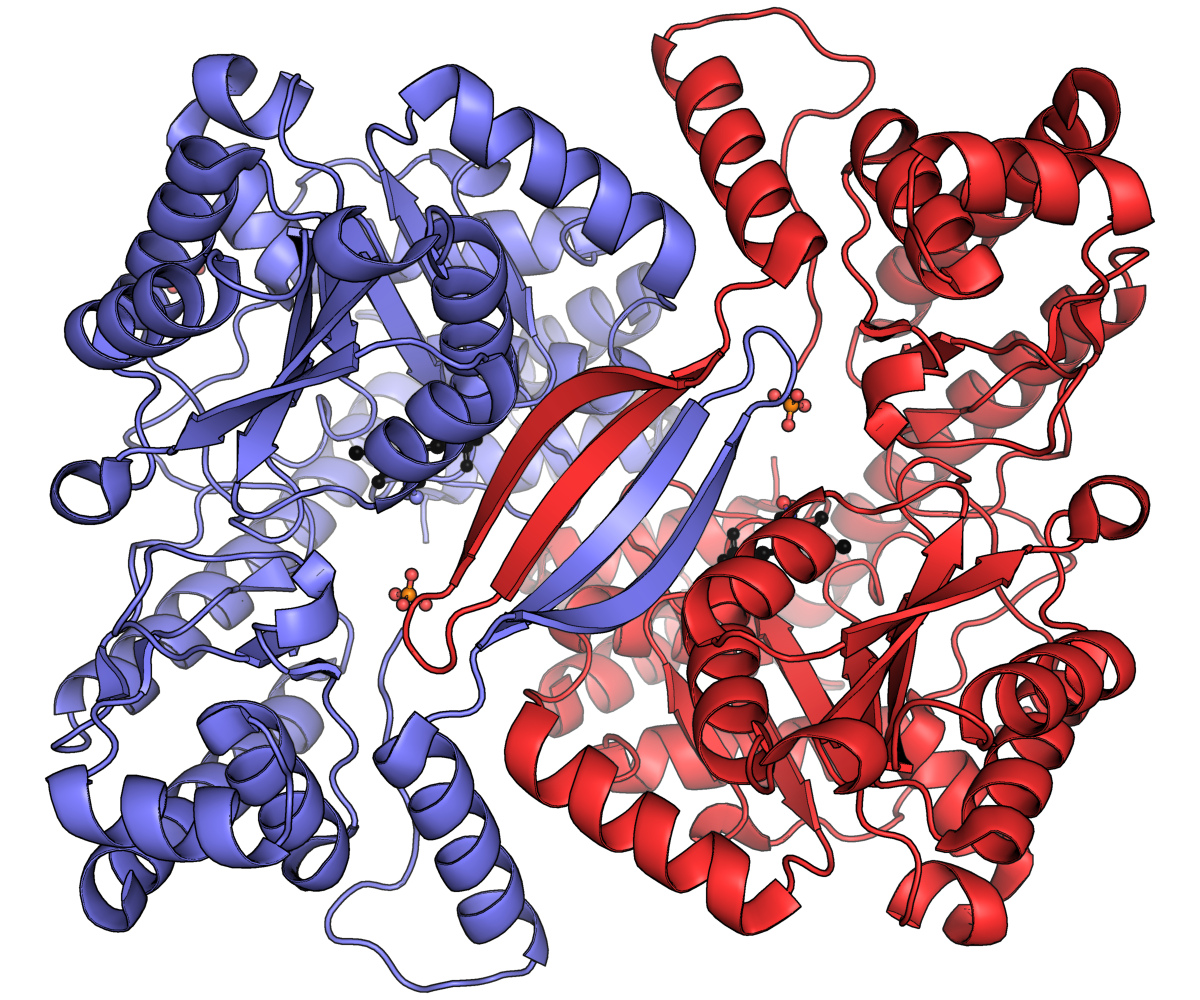
- Human alanine transaminase 2 homodimer bound to PLP. PDB: 3IHJ

Identifiers
- EC no.: 2.6.1.2
- CAS no.: 9000-86-6

Databases
- BRENDA: enzyme data
- ExPASy: NiceZyme view
- KEGG: enzyme entry
- MetaCyc: metabolic pathway
- Rhea: reactions
- PDB structures: RCSB PDB PDBe PDBsum
- Gene Ontology: AmiGO / QuickGO
Search
- PMC: articles
- PubMed: articles
- NCBI: proteins

Alanine aminotransferase (ALT or ALAT), formerly alanine transaminase (ALT), and even earlier referred to as serum glutamate-pyruvate transaminase (GPT) or serum glutamic-pyruvic transaminase (SGPT), is a transaminase enzyme (EC 2.6.1.2) that was first characterized in the mid-1950s by Arthur Karmen and colleagues. There are two proteins in humans which perform this activity, and they are encoded by the genes GPT and GPT2. ALT is found in plasma and in various body tissues but is most common in the liver. It catalyzes the two parts of the alanine cycle. Serum ALT level, serum AST (aspartate transaminase) level, and their ratio (AST/ALT ratio) are routinely measured clinically as biomarkers for liver health.

The half-life of ALT in the circulation approximates 47 hours. Aminotransferase is cleared by sinusoidal cells in the liver.

== Function ==
ALT catalyzes the transfer of an amino group from L-alanine to α-ketoglutarate, the products of this reversible transamination reaction being pyruvate and L-glutamate.

L-alanine + α-ketoglutarate ⇌ pyruvate + L-glutamate

ALT (and all aminotransferases) require the coenzyme pyridoxal phosphate, which is converted into pyridoxamine in the first phase of the reaction, when an amino acid is converted into a keto acid.

== Clinical significance ==
ALT is commonly measured clinically as part of liver function tests and is a component of the AST/ALT ratio. When used in diagnostics, it is almost always measured in international units/liter (IU/L) or μkat. While sources vary on specific reference range values for patients, 0-40 IU/L is the standard reference range for experimental studies.

=== Elevated levels ===
Test results should always be interpreted using the reference range from the laboratory that produced the result. However typical reference intervals for ALT are:

Patient type	Reference ranges
Male	≤ 45 IU/L
Female	≤ 34 IU/L

Significantly elevated levels of ALT (SGPT) often suggest the existence of other medical problems such as viral hepatitis, diabetes, congestive heart failure, liver damage, bile duct problems, infectious mononucleosis, or myopathy, so ALT is commonly used as a way of screening for liver problems. Elevated ALT may also be caused by dietary choline deficiency. However, elevated levels of ALT do not automatically mean that medical problems exist. Fluctuation of ALT levels is normal over the course of the day, and they can also increase in response to strenuous physical exercise.

When elevated ALT levels are found in the blood, the possible underlying causes can be further narrowed down by measuring other enzymes. For example, elevated ALT levels due to hepatocyte damage can be distinguished from bile duct problems by measuring alkaline phosphatase. Also, myopathy-related elevations in ALT should be suspected when the aspartate transaminase (AST) is greater than ALT; the possibility of muscle disease causing elevations in liver tests can be further explored by measuring muscle enzymes, including creatine kinase. Many drugs may elevate ALT levels, including zileuton, omega−3-acid ethyl esters (Lovaza), anti-inflammatory drugs, antibiotics, cholesterol medications, some antipsychotics such as risperidone, and anticonvulsants. Paracetamol (acetaminophen) may also elevate ALT levels.

For years, the American Red Cross used ALT testing as part of the battery of tests to ensure the safety of its blood supply by deferring donors with elevated ALT levels. The intent was to identify donors potentially infected with hepatitis C because no specific test for that disease was available at the time. Prior to July 1992, widespread blood donation testing in the US for hepatitis C was not carried out by major blood banks. With the introduction of second-generation ELISA antibody tests for hepatitis C, the Red Cross changed the ALT policy. As of July 2003, donors previously disqualified for elevated ALT levels and no other reason may be reinstated as donors when they contact the donor-counseling department of their regional Red Cross organization.

In 2000, the American Association for Clinical Chemistry determined that the appropriate terminology for AST and ALT are aspartate aminotransferase and alanine aminotransferase. The term transaminase is outdated and no longer used in liver disease.

=== Low ALT ===
Low plasma ALT can be a marker of low muscle mass and is associated with frailty, sarcopenia, disability, as well as increased mortality in the elderly population. In patients with inflammatory bowel disease, low ALT is associated with a more active disease.

== See also ==
- Aspartate transaminase
- Liver function tests
- Fatty liver disease
