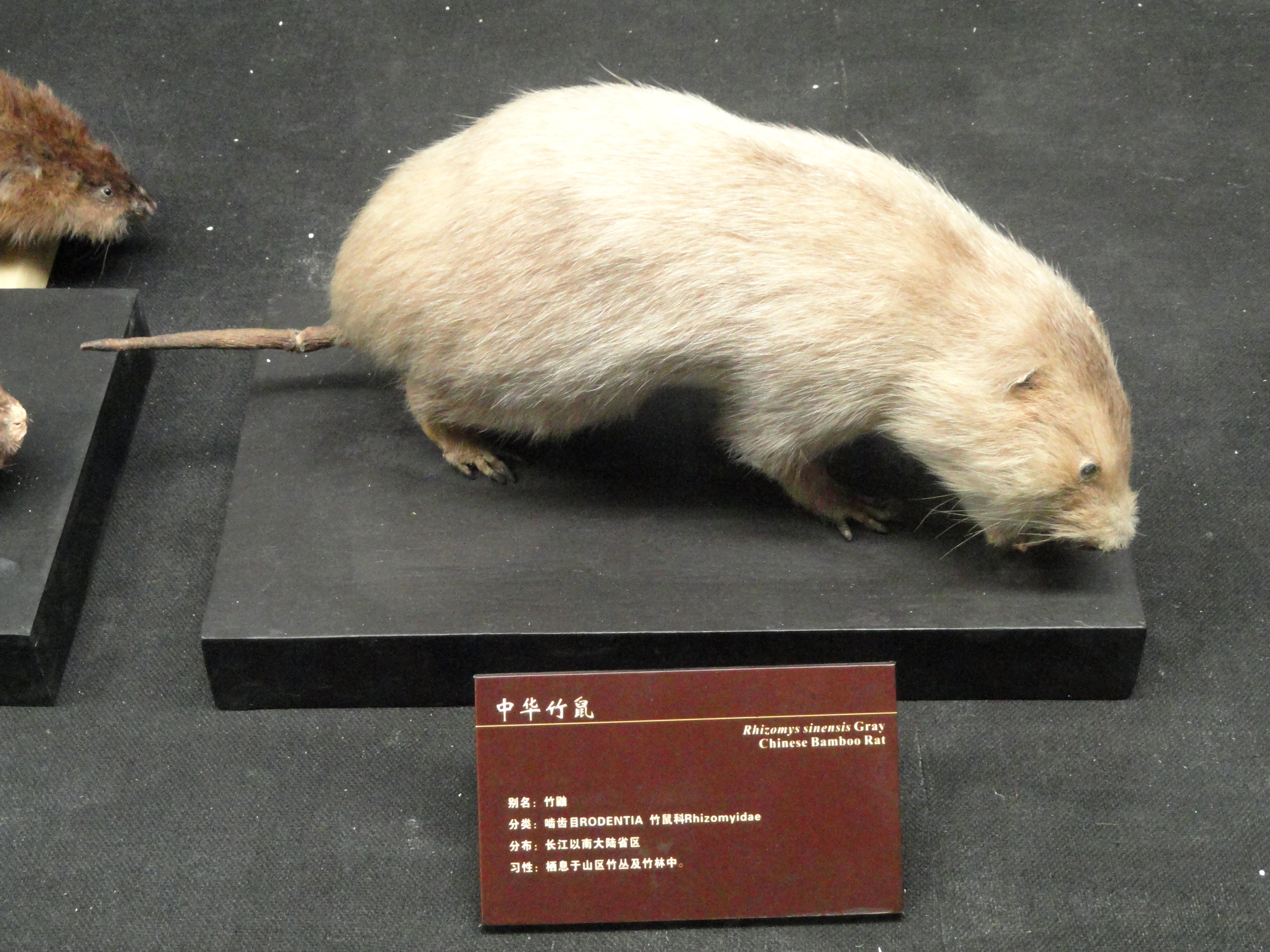

Conservation status
- Least Concern (IUCN 3.1)

Scientific classification
- Kingdom: Animalia
- Phylum: Chordata
- Class: Mammalia
- Order: Rodentia
- Family: Spalacidae
- Genus: Rhizomys
- Species: R. sinensis

Binomial name
- Rhizomys sinensis J. E. Gray, 1831
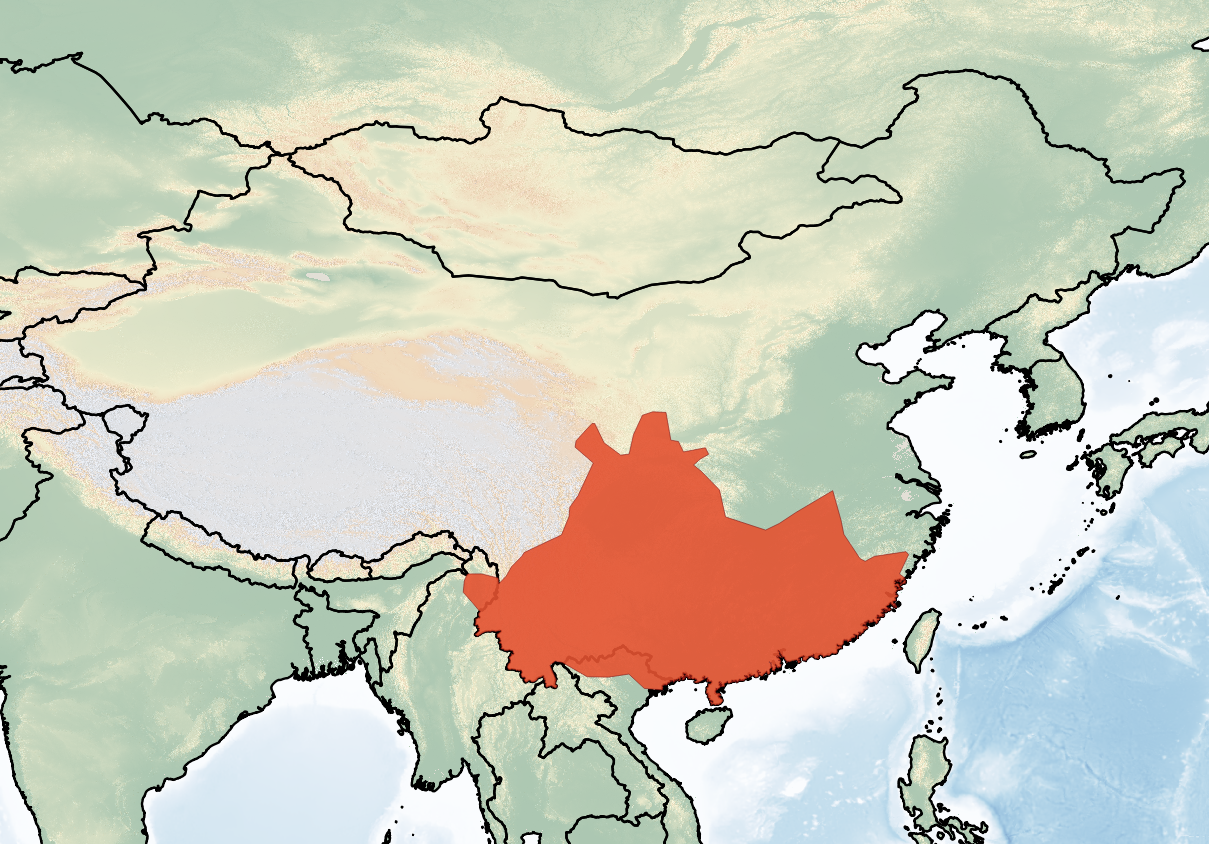

= Chinese bamboo rat =

Species of rodent

The Chinese bamboo rat (Rhizomys sinensis) is a species of rodent in the family Spalacidae found in southern China, northern Myanmar, and northern Vietnam. Its habitat is bamboo thickets usually at high elevations, pine forests, and plantations.

== Description ==
The head and body length is 216 to 380 mm (8.5 to 15.0 in) with a tail of 50 to 96 mm (2.0 to 3.8 in) and the weight is 1,875 to 1,950 g (66.1 to 68.8 oz). The fur is soft with no guard hairs as are seen in the closely related hoary bamboo rat (Rhizomys pruinosus). On the side of the face and the crown the fur is dark greyish brown and on the body paler greyish brown. The ventral side is sparsely haired.

== Behaviour ==
The Chinese bamboo rat is solitary, except during the breeding season. It breeds all year round, with a spring peak; litters of two to four young (eight maximum) are born naked, and are weaned at three months. Territory is marked by four to seven soil mounds marking plugged entrances (20 to 40 cm high and 50 to 80 cm across). Burrows are 20 to 30 cm deep and up to 45 m long. Escape tunnels are always at the ready, loosely plugged with soil. The nest chamber is 20 to 25 cm across and is lined with bamboo leaves. Mostly, it feeds on bamboo shoots and roots, usually on the surface, and moves on after about a year as the food supply becomes depleted. Predators include the snow leopard and the red panda.

== Status ==
The Chinese bamboo rat has a very wide range, is common in some localities, is considered a plantation pest in parts of China, and is presumed to have a large total population. The main threat it faces is being hunted by humans for food. The Chinese bamboo rat has been farmed since the 1990s as a source of meat in southern China. In 2011, the number of farmed animals was more than 30 million in China, mainly distributed in the Guangxi, Hunan, Guangdong, Jiangxi and Zhejiang Provinces. The International Union for Conservation of Nature has listed it as being of "least concern".

== Parasites ==
Not much is known about the parasites of the Chinese Bamboo rat. The protozoans Cryptosporidium spp. and Giardia duodenalis and the nematode Trichinella spiralis have been reported. A 2021 study revealed that 4.6 % of farmed animals Hunan Province, south-central China, were infected by the protozoan parasite Blastocystis sp., a zoonotic pathogen.

== See also ==
- List of endangered and protected species of China
