= Glycoside hydrolase family 18 =

Class of enzymes

Glycosyl hydrolases family 18
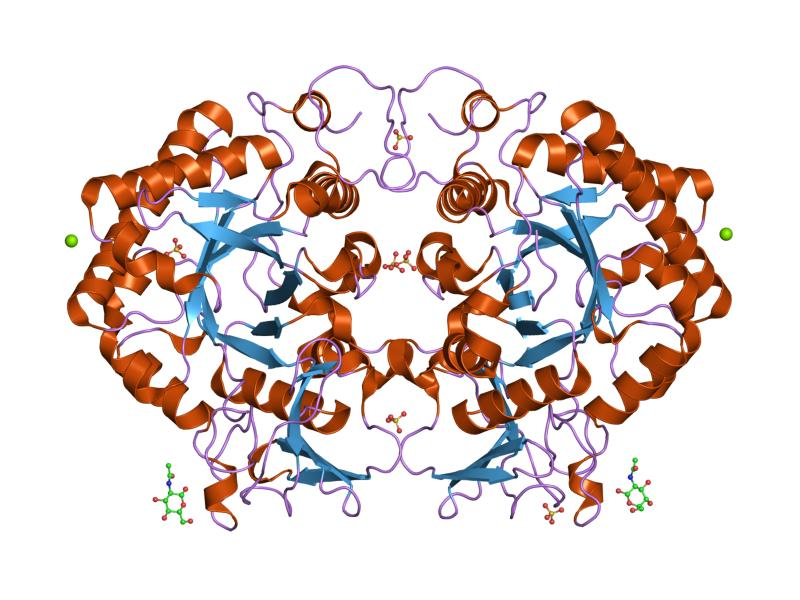
- crystal structure of a native chitinase from aspergillus fumigatus yj-407

Identifiers
- Symbol: Glyco_hydro_18
- Pfam: PF00704
- Pfam clan: CL0058
- InterPro: IPR001223
- SCOP2: 1ctn / SCOPe / SUPFAM
- OPM superfamily: 117
- OPM protein: 1nh6
- CDD: cd00598
- Membranome: 1385
Available protein structures:
- PDB: IPR001223 PF00704 (ECOD; PDBsum)
- AlphaFold: IPR001223; PF00704

In molecular biology, Glycoside hydrolase family 18 is a family of glycoside hydrolases.

Glycoside hydrolases EC 3.2.1. are a widespread group of enzymes that hydrolyse the glycosidic bond between two or more carbohydrates, or between a carbohydrate and a non-carbohydrate moiety. A classification system for glycoside hydrolases, based on sequence similarity, has led to the definition of >100 different families. This classification is available on the CAZy web site, and also discussed at CAZypedia, an online encyclopedia of carbohydrate active enzymes.

Some members of this family, CAZY GH_18, belong to the chitinase class II group which includes chitinase, chitodextrinase and the killer toxin of Kluyveromyces lactis. The chitinases hydrolyse chitin oligosaccharides. Another chitinase II member is the novel gene Chitinase domain-containing protein 1. The family also includes various glycoproteins from mammals; cartilage glycoprotein and the oviduct-specific glycoproteins are two examples.
