= AIDS-defining clinical condition =

CDC list of diseases associated with AIDS

AIDS-defining clinical conditions (also known as AIDS-defining illnesses or AIDS-defining diseases) is the list of diseases published by the Centers for Disease Control and Prevention (CDC) that are associated with AIDS and used worldwide as a guideline for AIDS diagnosis. CDC exclusively uses the term AIDS-defining clinical conditions, but the other terms remain in common use.

This list governs the US government's classification of HIV disease. This is to allow the government to handle epidemic statistics and define who receives US government assistance. However, considerable variation exists in the relative risk of death following different AIDS-defining clinical conditions.

== Definition ==
According to the CDC definition, a patient has AIDS if they are infected with HIV and have either:

- a CD4+ T-cell count below 200 cells/μL
- a CD4+ T-cell percentage of total lymphocytes of less than 14%
- or one of the defining illnesses.

A patient presenting one of the above conditions but with laboratory evidence against HIV infection is not normally considered to have AIDS, but an AIDS diagnosis may be given if the patient has had Pneumocystis jirovecii pneumonia, and has not:

- undergone high-dose corticoid therapy or other immunosuppressive/cytotoxic therapy in the three months before the onset of the indicator disease
- been diagnosed with Hodgkin's disease, non-Hodgkin's lymphoma, lymphocytic leukemia, multiple myeloma, or any cancer of lymphoreticular or histiocytic tissue, or angioimmunoblastic lymphoadenopathy
- or been diagnosed with a genetic immunodeficiency syndrome atypical of HIV infection, such as one involving hypogammaglobulinemia.

== Defining illnesses ==
=== 2008 definition ===
Are the following:

1. Candidiasis of bronchi, trachea, or lungs
2. Candidiasis esophageal
3. Coccidioidomycosis, disseminated or extrapulmonary
4. Cryptococcosis, extrapulmonary
5. Cryptosporidiosis, chronic intestinal for longer than 1 month
6. Cytomegalovirus disease (other than liver, spleen or lymph nodes)
7. Cytomegalovirus retinitis (with loss of vision)
8. Encephalopathy (HIV-related)
9. Herpes simplex: chronic ulcer(s) (for more than 1 month); or bronchitis, pneumonitis, or esophagitis
10. Histoplasmosis, disseminated or extrapulmonary
11. Isosporiasis, chronic intestinal (for more than 1 month)
12. Kaposi's sarcoma
13. Lymphoma, Burkitt's
14. Lymphoma, immunoblastic (or equivalent term)
15. Lymphoma, primary, of brain
16. Mycobacterium avium complex or Mycobacterium kansasii, disseminated or extrapulmonary
17. Mycobacterium, other species, disseminated or extrapulmonary
18. Mycobacterium tuberculosis, any site (extrapulmonary)
19. Pneumocystis jirovecii pneumonia (formerly Pneumocystis carinii)
20. Progressive multifocal leukoencephalopathy
21. Salmonella sepsis (recurrent)
22. Toxoplasmosis of the brain
23. Tuberculosis, disseminated
24. Wasting syndrome due to HIV

=== Added in 1993 ===
1. Cervical cancer (invasive)
2. Mycobacterium tuberculosis, any site (pulmonary)
3. Pneumonia (recurrent)

=== Children < 13 years ===
Additional conditions are included for children younger than 13:

- Bacterial infections, multiple or recurrent
- Lymphoid interstitial pneumonia or pulmonary lymphoid hyperplasia complex

== History ==
In 1993, the CDC added pulmonary tuberculosis, recurrent pneumonia and invasive cervical cancer to the list of clinical conditions in the AIDS surveillance case definition published in 1987 and expanded the AIDS surveillance case definition to include all HIV-infected persons with CD4+ T-lymphocyte counts of fewer than 200 cells/μL or a CD4+ percentage of less than 14. Outside the US, however, diagnosis with a listed opportunistic infection is still required.

It has been suggested that other conditions (such as penicilliosis) should be included in other countries.

== Common defining conditions ==
=== Kaposi's sarcoma ===
Kaposi's sarcoma (KS) is an extremely common disease that arises in AIDS patients and HIV-infected individuals. The condition is characterized by large purple lesions on the skin and mouth. KS presents itself differently for everyone affected by it, and its symptoms and progression varies from person to person as well. There are four different populations that are at risk for KS, all of which are caused by infection with human herpesvirus 8. In the United States, almost every case of Kaposi's Sarcoma is indirectly caused by HIV infection. The disease is the most common among male homosexuals, presumably because human herpesvirus 8 exists with the most prevalence within this population.

The remaining types of KS are known as Classic (Mediterranean), Endemic (African), and Transplant-related Kaposi's Sarcoma. Classic KS is common in regions of the Middle East, where herpesvirus 8 is fairly prevalent. KS occurrences in these regions are mainly found in older men, which is thought to be due to the natural decline of the immune system's strength when we age. Endemic KS presents itself the same way, but is a result of many people in certain regions of Africa being infected with human herpesvirus 8. In contrast to older men being affected in Classical infections, Endemic KS mainly affects young children, as the virus is transferred from mother to child via saliva. The final type of KS, transplant-related, is theoretically capable of manifesting in anyone. Transplant patients must take very strong immunosuppressant drugs to ensure that the body does not reject their new heart, liver, etc. However, a consequence of this is, of course, that their immune system becomes quite weak, and therefore very susceptible to infections. In a similar manner to how HIV contributes to KS, transplant patients are also at high risk for it, especially if the transplant was performed in a country where human herpesvirus 8 is endemic. In recent years, however, incidences of Kaposi's sarcoma in the United States have dwindled so much that physicians today often fail to consider it as a possibility when making diagnoses.

=== Toxoplasmosis ===
In the central nervous system, the most common AIDS-defining condition is toxoplasmosis. Caused by the parasite Toxoplasma gondii, toxoplasmosis in HIV-infected patients mainly presents as encephalitis, or inflammation of the brain, but can take other forms as well, such as inflammation of the retinas or lungs. Toxoplasma, like most parasites, carries out its infection in distinct stages of life. Strangely enough, while many tissues can harbor the parasite, it is only capable of reproducing sexually in cats. Cats are carriers of the oocyst- the infective form of Toxoplasma Gondii. Once these oocysts have entered a human, they can differentiate into their next stage of life, the tachyzoite. These cells can invade our own, rapidly divide by means of binary fission, lose our cells, and travel throughout our bodies. As a result of the immune response that this invasion causes, the tachyzoites become dormant, forming cysts called bradyzoites that are commonly found in the brain and skeletal muscle. In immunocompromised patients, such as those with HIV, the infection becomes much more deadly, as without a consistent or strong enough immune response following bradyzoite formation, tachyzoites can escape from the cysts, facilitating further systemic infection and inflammation. In physiologically typical individuals, the infection will generally be taken care of by the immune system, rarely causing any actual illness. In fact, it is estimated that in some areas of the world, more than sixty percent of people have been exposed to the Toxoplasma parasite in their lifetime. HIV patients, on the other hand, are often affected by intense pain, difficulty seeing and breathing, or partial blindness due to toxoplasmosis as a result of an insufficient immune response.
