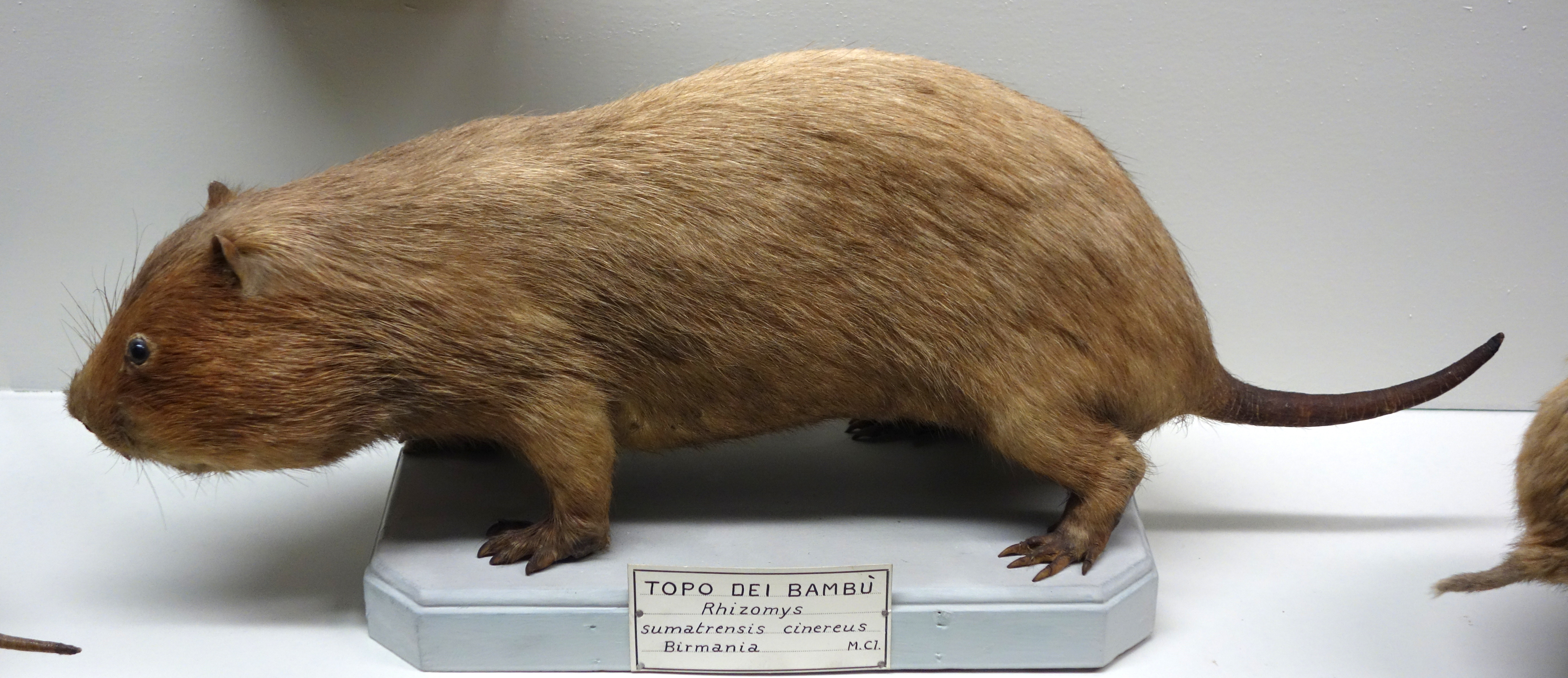

Conservation status
- Least Concern (IUCN 3.1)

Scientific classification
- Kingdom: Animalia
- Phylum: Chordata
- Class: Mammalia
- Order: Rodentia
- Family: Spalacidae
- Genus: Rhizomys
- Species: R. sumatrensis

Binomial name
- Rhizomys sumatrensis (Raffles, 1821)
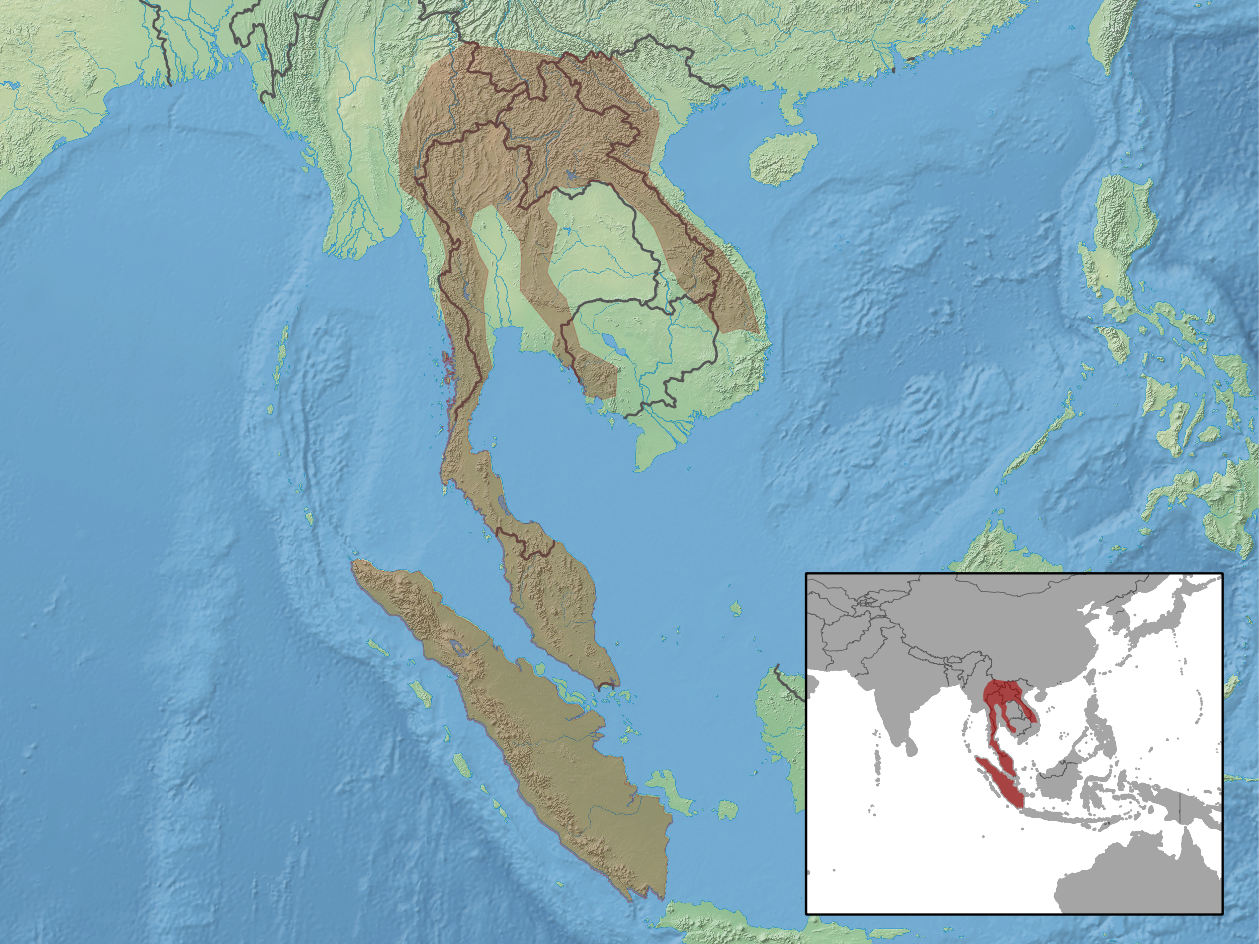

= Large bamboo rat =

Species of rodent

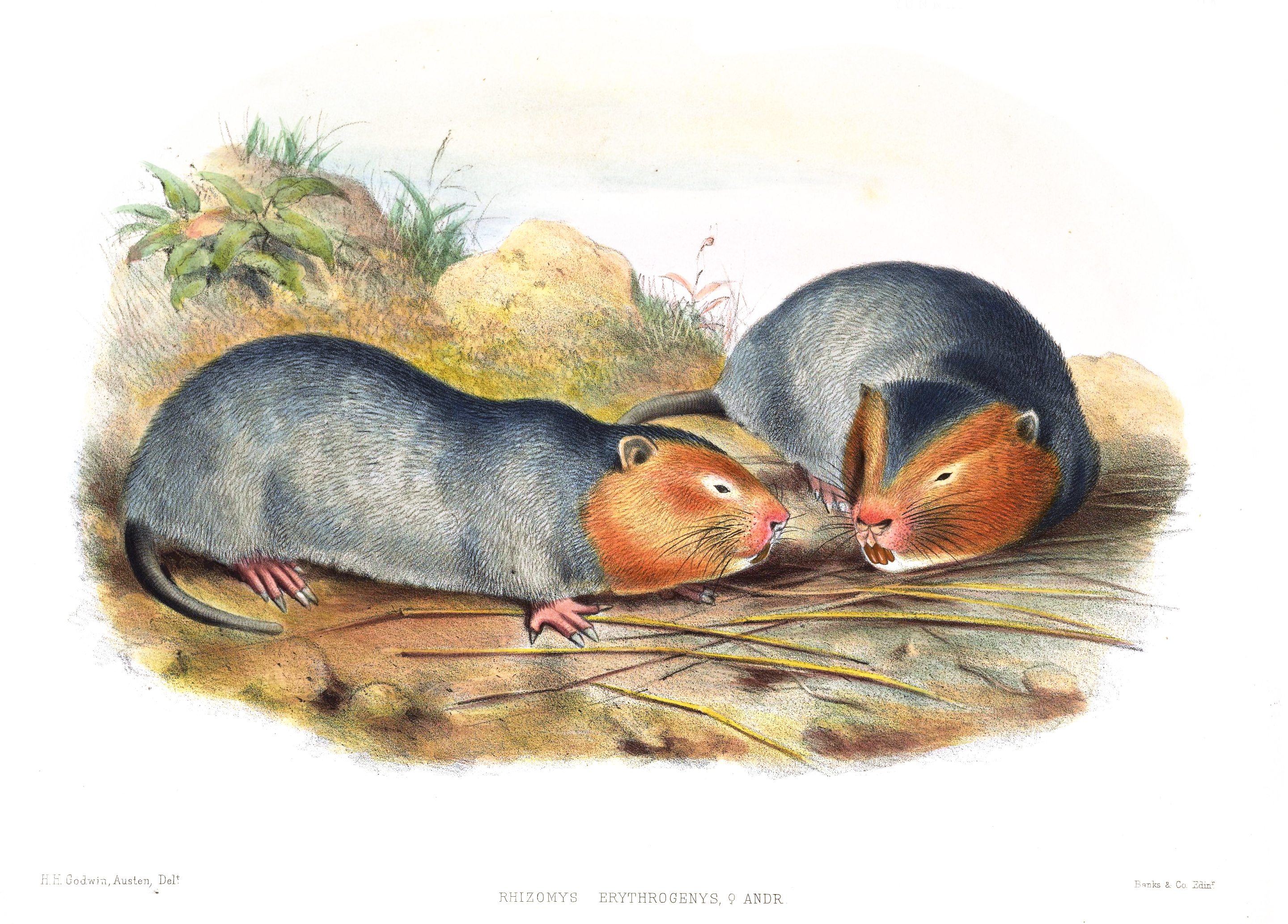
Female R. s. erythrogenys

The large bamboo rat, Sumatran rat, or Indomalayan rat (Rhizomys sumatrensis) is a species of rodent in the family Spalacidae found in Southeast Asia.

== Range ==
Bamboo rats are found in bamboo-rich environments of Cambodia, Southern China, Indonesia, Laos, Malaysia, Myanmar, Thailand, and Vietnam. It primarily resides in bamboo forests, montane forests, and agricultural areas.

== Description ==
Individuals can reach lengths of 30 cm (12 in) to 45 cm (18 in) with a 20 cm (7.9 in) tail, and weigh from 1 to 3 kilograms (2.2 to 6.6 lb).

All Rhizomys species share a common body form, with a massively broadened head, a plump body with short limbs, strong claws on both the pes and manus, small eyes and ears, and a short, sparsely haired tail that lacks scales (it is instead covered in soft, wrinkled skin).

Rhizomys species have grey–brown to dull orange brown fur, rounded ears that just project through the fur, and granulated plantar pads on the manus and pes (compared to smooth pads in Cannomys badius). Rhizomys sumatrensis (Raffles, 1821) grows to a much greater size than the other species, the tail is relatively longer, and the top of the head bears a distinctive, triangular patch of dark fur.

Litter size is reported as three to five in R. sumatrensis, which has a gestation period of at least 22 days. The young grow hair at about 10–13 days, open their eyes at 24 days, and are weaned over an extended period from 1–3 months after birth. Life span in captivity is about four years.

== Diet ==
It feeds on bamboo shoots, roots, and underground plant parts. They also feed on cultivated tapioca and sugarcane. They are, in turn, hunted as food by humans.

== Ecological impact ==
Rhizomys sumatrensis plays a significant ecological role by aerating soil through its extensive burrow systems. Although their burrows are sometimes located in slash-and-burn gardens, it is unclear how much damage they inflict on crops.

== Disease ecology ==
The species is a natural host for the disease-causing mold, Penicillium marneffei.

== In popular culture ==
It is one of several species of large rats that have been identified by scholars of Sherlockiana as the original model for the mysterious Giant Rat of Sumatra alluded to in a fictional story by Sir Arthur Conan Doyle.
