= STAB1 =

Protein-coding gene in the species Homo sapiens

Identifiers
- Aliases: STAB1, CLEVER-1, FEEL-1, FELE-1, FEX1, STAB-1, SCARH2, stabilin 1, FEEL1
- External IDs: OMIM: 608560; MGI: 2178742; GeneCards: STAB1

Gene location (Human)
Chr.	Chromosome 3 (human)
Band	3p21.1	Start	52,495,338 bp
Band	3p21.1	End	52,524,495 bp

Gene location (Mouse)
Chr.	Chromosome 14 (mouse)
Band	14|14 B	Start	31,139,013 bp
Band	14|14 B	End	31,168,641 bp
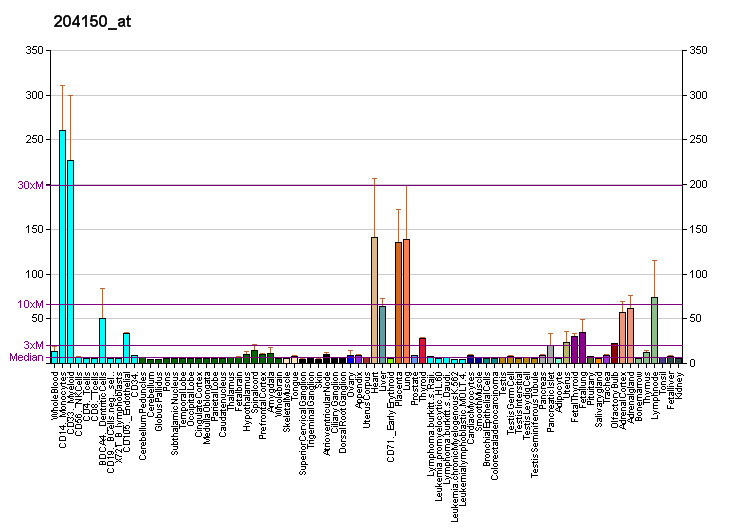

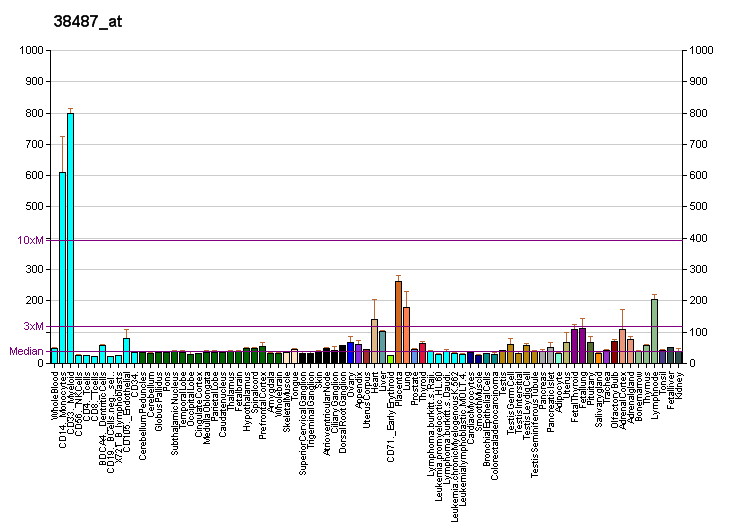
RNA expression pattern
Bgee	Human / Mouse (ortholog); Top expressed in: spleen; right adrenal cortex; right coronary artery; left adrenal cortex; gastric mucosa; apex of heart; left coronary artery; left uterine tube; tibial nerve; upper lobe of left lung / Top expressed in: stroma of bone marrow; endothelial cell of lymphatic vessel; internal carotid artery; external carotid artery; umbilical cord; yolk sac; dermis; tunica adventitia of aorta; aortic valve; left lobe of liver; More reference expression data
BioGPS	More reference expression data
Gene ontology
Molecular function	protein-disulfide reductase activity; low-density lipoprotein particle receptor activity; scavenger receptor activity; protein binding; hyaluronic acid binding; low-density lipoprotein particle binding; calcium ion binding
Cellular component	integral component of membrane; endocytic vesicle membrane; plasma membrane; integral component of plasma membrane; membrane
Biological process	negative regulation of angiogenesis; cell-cell signaling; cell adhesion; inflammatory response; defense response to bacterium; receptor-mediated endocytosis
Sources:Amigo / QuickGO
Orthologs
Databases	NCBI: entry; OMA: entry
Species	Human	Mouse
Entrez	23166	192187
Ensembl	ENSG00000010327	ENSMUSG00000042286
UniProt	Q9NY15	Q8R4Y4
RefSeq (mRNA)	NM_015136	NM_138672
RefSeq (protein)	NP_055951	n/a
Location (UCSC)	Chr 3: 52.5 – 52.52 Mb	Chr 14: 31.14 – 31.17 Mb
PubMed search
- Wikidata
View/Edit Human	View/Edit Mouse

Stabilin-1 is a protein that in humans is encoded by the STAB1 gene.

This gene encodes a large, transmembrane receptor protein which may function in angiogenesis, lymphocyte homing, cell adhesion, or receptor scavenging. The protein contains 7 fasciclin, 16 epidermal growth factor (EGF)-like, and 2 laminin-type EGF-like domains as well as a C-type lectin-like hyaluronan-binding Link module. The protein is primarily expressed on sinusoidal endothelial cells of liver, spleen, and lymph node. The receptor has been shown to endocytose ligands such as low density lipoprotein, Gram-positive and Gram-negative bacteria, and advanced glycosylation end products. Supporting its possible role as a scavenger receptor, the protein rapidly cycles between the plasma membrane and early endosomes. STAB1 is also known to interact with the protein chitinase domain-containing protein 1.
