= Reticuloendothelial system =

System of specialized cells in anatomy

In anatomy, the reticuloendothelial system (abbreviated RES) is a network of immune cells distributed throughout the body that defends against foreign invaders, clears cellular debris, and recycles iron.

The term "reticuloendothelial system", more accurately called the mononuclear phagocyte system (MPS), was employed by the beginning of the 20th century to denote a system of specialised cells that effectively clear colloidal vital stains (so called because they stain living cells) from the blood circulation. The term is still used today but its meaning has changed over the years, and it is used inconsistently in present-day literature. Although RES is commonly associated exclusively with macrophages, recent research has revealed that the cells that accumulate intravenously administered vital stain belong to a highly specialised group of cells called scavenger endothelial cells (SECs) that are not macrophages.

== History ==
In the 1920s, the originator of the term RES, Ludwig Aschoff, reviewed the field of vital staining, and concluded that the cells lining the hepatic sinusoids are by far the most numerous and important cells accumulating intravenously administered vital stains in mammals and other vertebrates. Cells lining the lymph sinuses, and the capillaries of the adrenals, pituitary and bone marrow also accumulated vital stains, yet to a lower extent. Based on these observations Aschoff in his review concluded that these were the organs housing the cells of the RES, in the narrow sense of the term. At the time when the notion of RES was launched, the understanding of concepts like endothelium, macrophages and phagocytosis were immature compared to what we know today, and during the centennium that followed there has been a considerable change in the way we understand these terms today.

== The RES – MPS confusion ==
During the years that followed after Aschoff had originated the concept of RES, research on macrophages and their role as phagocytes steadily increased, and in 1960 the concept of the mononuclear phagocyte system was proposed to denote all cells identified as macrophages. The cells of MPS, by way of their common functional signature as professional phagocytes, clear particulate matter such as bacteria, fungi, viruses, and dying cells from the circulation. Since blood clearance is also a characteristic function of cells of RES, it was suggested in the late 1960s that RES is identical to MPS, and it was proposed that the term RES be replaced with MPS.

During the 1980s and 1990s, some laboratories noted that specialized endothelial cells (called scavenger endothelial cells), but not macrophages, were responsible for the avid clearance of macromolecules and nanoparticles from the blood circulation. This triggered a re-evaluation of the well-established notion that RES is identical to MPS. In 1998, experiments were carried out to repeat the studies of Aschoff, following exactly the original methods description, and using modern ways of identifying the cells that were responsible for clearance of intravascularly injected colloidal lithium carmine, the most commonly used vital stain. The studies showed that the cell system that Aschoff described as RES in the liver were liver sinusoidal endothelial cells (LSECs), but not liver macrophages (Kupffer cells).

In most present-day text books and articles the term RES is used synonymously with MPS. This is especially unfortunate when discussing e.g. blood clearance of nano formulations. Refraining from including the highly active LSEC when discussing blood clearance may lead to failure to understand the mechanisms of clearance of several substances from the circulation.

== See also ==
- Mononuclear phagocyte system
