= STAB2 =

Protein-coding gene in the species Homo sapiens

Identifiers
- Aliases: STAB2, FEEL2, FELE-2, FELL2, FEX2, HARE, SCARH1, stabilin 2
- External IDs: OMIM: 608561; MGI: 2178743; GeneCards: STAB2

Gene location (Human)
Chr.	Chromosome 12 (human)
Band	12q23.3	Start	103,587,273 bp
Band	12q23.3	End	103,766,719 bp

Gene location (Mouse)
Chr.	Chromosome 10 (mouse)
Band	10|10 C1	Start	86,841,198 bp
Band	10|10 C1	End	87,008,025 bp
RNA expression pattern
Bgee	Human / Mouse (ortholog); Top expressed in: spleen; right lobe of liver; testicle; muscle layer of sigmoid colon; sperm; lymph node; oocyte; superficial temporal artery; popliteal artery; tibial arteries / Top expressed in: mesenteric lymph nodes; spleen; left lobe of liver; yolk sac; muscle of thigh; knee joint; female urethra; triceps brachii muscle; gastrocnemius muscle; tibiofemoral joint; More reference expression data
BioGPS	n/a
Gene ontology
Molecular function	low-density lipoprotein particle receptor activity; protein-disulfide reductase activity; low-density lipoprotein particle binding; scavenger receptor activity; protein binding; hyaluronic acid binding; calcium ion binding
Cellular component	integral component of membrane; endocytic vesicle membrane; membrane; plasma membrane; integral component of plasma membrane; external side of plasma membrane; cytoplasm; cytosol
Biological process	endocytosis; hyaluronan catabolic process; receptor-mediated endocytosis; cell adhesion; defense response to bacterium; angiogenesis; defense response to Gram-positive bacterium
Sources:Amigo / QuickGO
Orthologs
Databases	NCBI: entry; OMA: entry
Species	Human	Mouse
Entrez	55576	192188
Ensembl	ENSG00000136011	ENSMUSG00000035459
UniProt	Q8WWQ8	Q8R4U0
RefSeq (mRNA)	NM_017564	NM_138673
RefSeq (protein)	NP_060034	NP_619614
Location (UCSC)	Chr 12: 103.59 – 103.77 Mb	Chr 10: 86.84 – 87.01 Mb
PubMed search
- Wikidata
View/Edit Human	View/Edit Mouse

Stabilin-2 is a protein that in humans is encoded by the STAB2 gene.

== Function ==
This gene encodes a large, transmembrane receptor protein which may function in angiogenesis, lymphocyte homing, cell adhesion, or receptor scavenging. The protein contains 7 fasciclin, 15 epidermal growth factor (EGF)-like, and 2 laminin-type EGF-like domains as well as a C-type lectin-like hyaluronan-binding Link module. The protein is primarily expressed on liver sinusoidal endothelial cells, spleen, and lymph node. The receptor has been shown to bind and endocytose ligands such as hyaluronan, low density lipoprotein, Gram-positive and Gram-negative bacteria, and advanced glycosylation end products. Supporting its possible role as a scavenger receptor, the protein has been shown to cycle between the plasma membrane and lysosomes.
