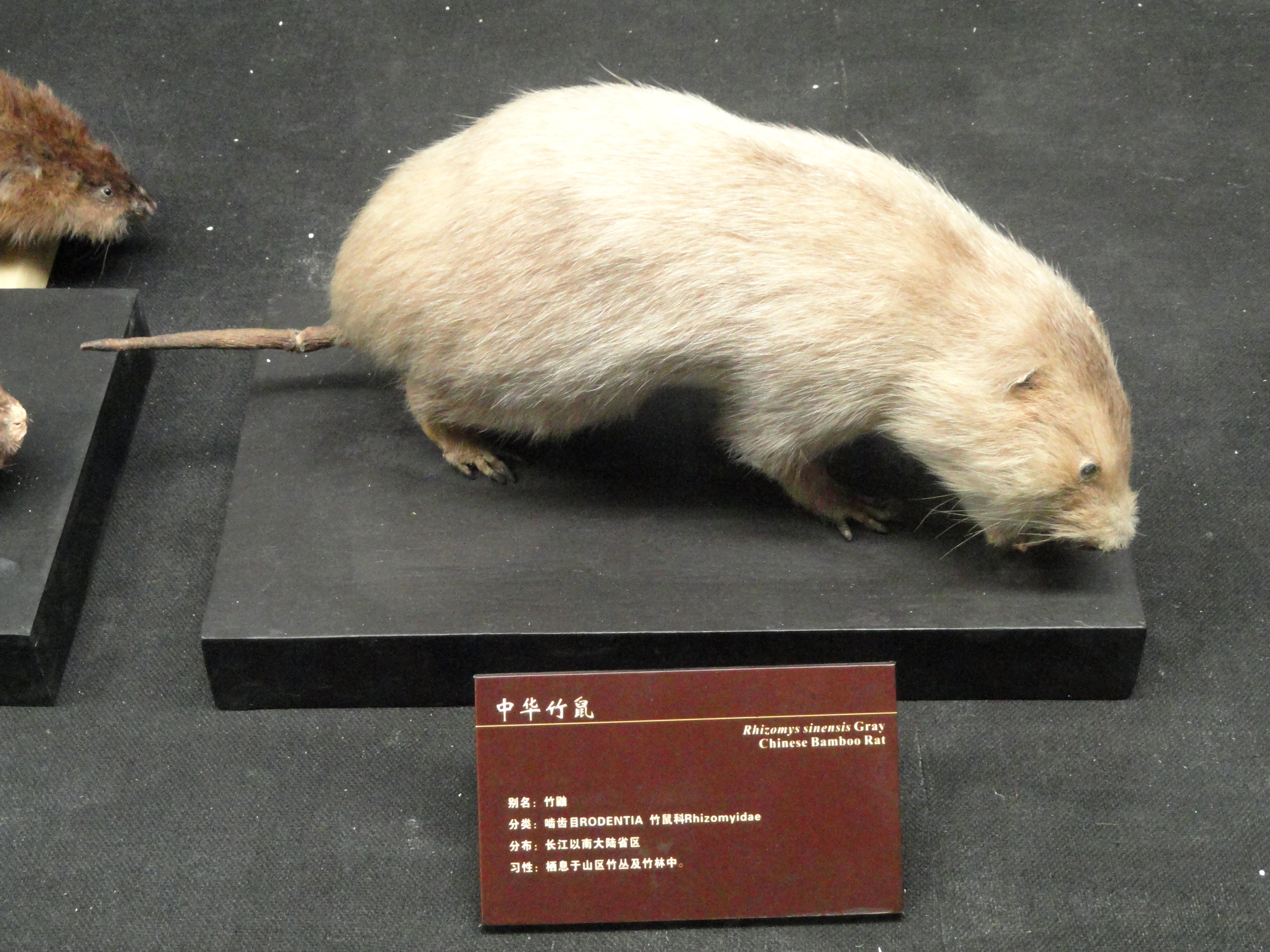
- Chinese bamboo rat, (Rhizomys sinensis)

Scientific classification
- Domain: Eukaryota
- Kingdom: Animalia
- Phylum: Chordata
- Class: Mammalia
- Order: Rodentia
- Family: Spalacidae
- Tribe: Rhizomyini
- Genus: Rhizomys; J. E. Gray, 1831

Type species
- Rhizomys sinensis

Species
- Rhizomys pruinosus Rhizomys sinensis Rhizomys sumatrensis

= Rhizomys =

Genus of rodents

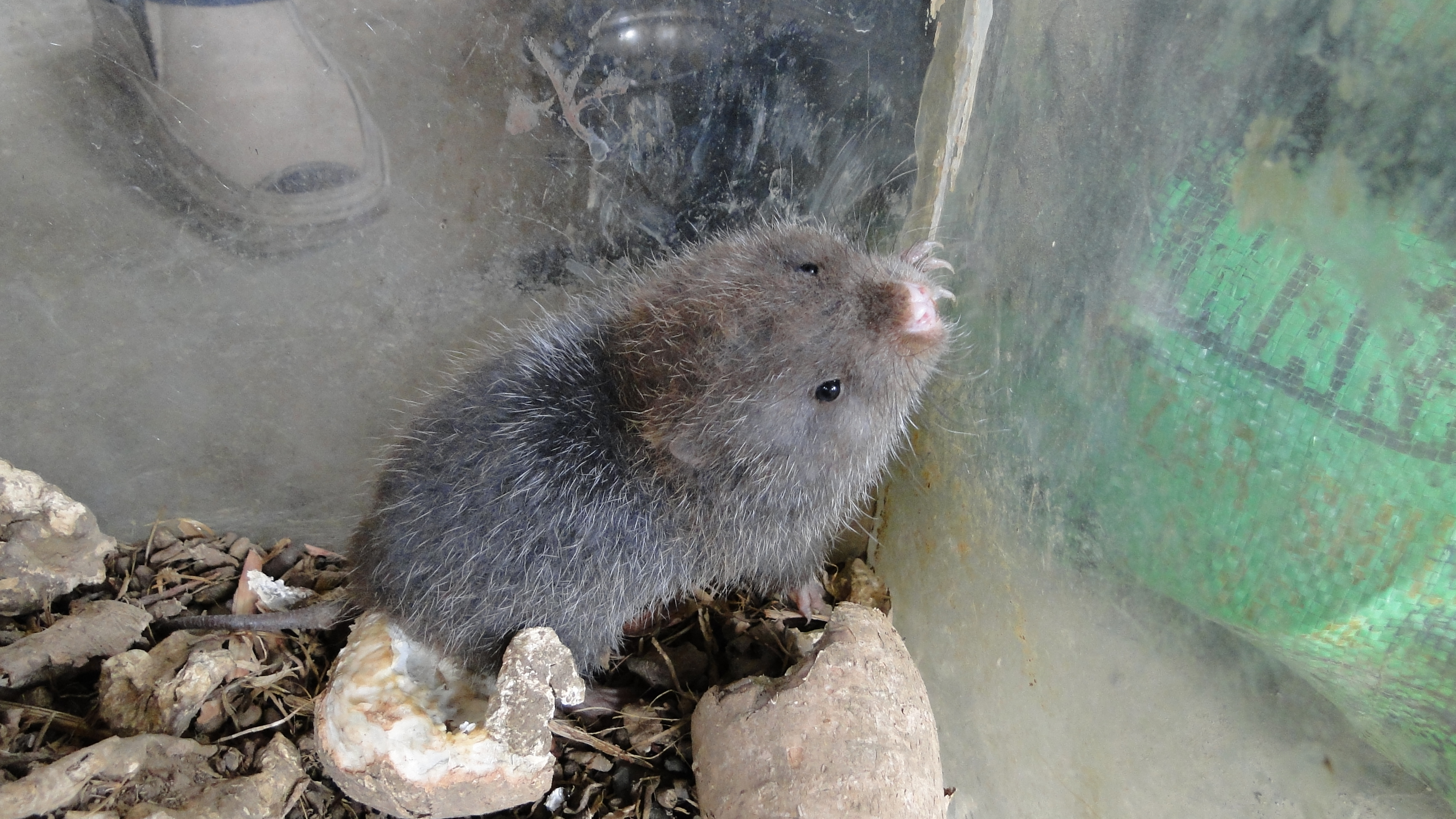
A bamboo rat from Nagaland, Northeastern India

Rhizomys, also known as bamboo rat, is a genus of rodents in the family Spalacidae. Rhizomys are all stocky burrowers with short, naked tails, and contains the following species:

- Hoary bamboo rat (R. pruinosus)
- Chinese bamboo rat (R. sinensis)
- Large bamboo rat (R. sumatrensis)
