= Fasciclin domain =

Fasciclin
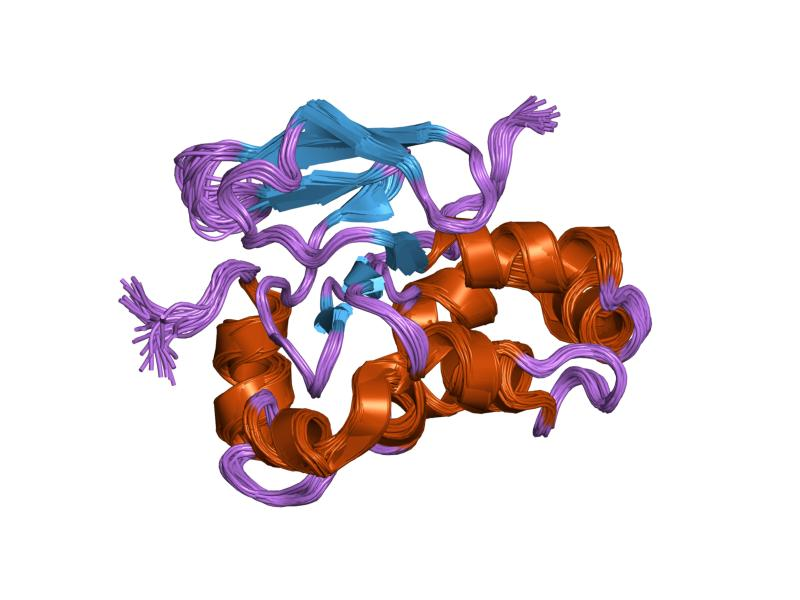
- solution structure of the antigenic tb protein mpt70/mpb70

Identifiers
- Symbol: Fasciclin
- Pfam: PF02469
- InterPro: IPR000782
- SCOP2: 1o70 / SCOPe / SUPFAM
Available protein structures:
- PDB: IPR000782 PF02469 (ECOD; PDBsum)
- AlphaFold: IPR000782; PF02469

In molecular biology, the fasciclin domain (FAS1 domain) is an extracellular domain of about 140 amino acid residues. It has been suggested that the FAS1 domain represents an ancient cell adhesion domain common to plants and animals; related FAS1 domains are also found in bacteria.

The crystal structure of FAS1 domains 3 and 4 of fasciclin I from Drosophila melanogaster (Fruit fly) has been determined, revealing a novel domain fold consisting of a seven-stranded beta wedge and at least five alpha helices; two well-ordered N-acetylglucosamine groups attached to a conserved asparagine are located in the interface region between the two FAS1 domains. Fasciclin I is an insect neural cell adhesion molecule involved in axonal guidance that is attached to the membrane by a GPI-anchored protein.

FAS1 domains are present in many secreted and membrane-anchored proteins. These proteins are usually GPI anchored and consist of: (i) a single FAS1 domain, (ii) a tandem array of FAS1 domains, or (iii) FAS1 domain(s) interspersed with other domains.

Proteins known to contain a FAS1 domain include:

- Fasciclin I (4 FAS1 domains).
- Human TGF-beta induced Ig-H3 (BIgH3) protein (4 FAS1 domains), where the FAS1 domains mediate cell adhesion through an interaction with alpha3/beta1 integrin; mutation in the FAS1 domains result in corneal dystrophy.
- Volvox major cell adhesion protein (2 FAS1 domains).
- Arabidopsis thaliana fasciclin-like arabinogalactan proteins (2 FAS1 domains).
- Mammalian stabilin protein, a family of fasciclin-like hyaluronan receptor homologues (7 FAS1 domains).
- Human extracellular matrix protein periostin (4 FAS1 domains).
- Bacterial immunogenic protein MPT70 (1 FAS1 domain).

The FAS1 domains of both human periostin and BIgH3 proteins were found to contain vitamin K-dependent gamma-carboxyglutamate residues. Gamma-carboxyglutamate residues are more commonly associated with GLA domains, where they occur through post-translational modification catalysed by the vitamin K-dependent enzyme gamma-glutamylcarboxylase.

== See also ==
- Fasciclin 2
