= Talaromycosis =

- Other names: Penicillium marneffei, penicilliosis or penicillosis
- Specialty: Infectious diseases
- Symptoms: skin lesions, fever, anaemia, large lymph glands, large liver. Sometimes none.
- Causes: Talaromyces marneffei
- Risk factors: HIV/AIDS, long-term steroids, organ transplant, old age, malnutrition
- Diagnostic method: Microscopy, culture, biopsy, medical imaging
- Differential diagnosis: Tuberculosis, histoplasmosis
- Prevention: Itraconazole
- Treatment: Antifungals
- Medication: Amphotericin B followed by itraconazole or voriconazole
- Prognosis: Often fatal if untreated
- Frequency: unknown M>F

Talaromycosis is a fungal infection that presents with painless skin lesions of the face and neck, as well as an associated fever, anaemia, and enlargement of the lymph glands and liver.

It is caused by the fungus Talaromyces marneffei, which is found in soil and decomposing organic matter. The infection is thought to be contracted by inhaling the fungus from the environment, though the environmental source of the organism is not known. People who have a weakened immune system due to conditions such as HIV/AIDS, cancer, organ transplant, long-term steroid use, old age, malnutrition or autoimmune disease are typically the ones to contract this infection. It generally does not affect healthy people and does not spread from person to person. Diagnosis is usually made by identification of the fungus from clinical specimens, either by microscopy or culture. Biopsies of skin lesions, lymph nodes, and bone marrow demonstrate the presence of organisms on histopathology. Medical imaging may reveal shadows in the lungs. The disease can look similar to tuberculosis and histoplasmosis.

Talaromycosis may be prevented in people at high risk, using the antifungal medication itraconazole, and is treatable with amphotericin B followed by itraconazole or voriconazole. The disease is fatal in 75% of those not given treatment.

Talaromycosis is endemic exclusively to southeast Asia (including southern China and eastern India), and particularly in young farmers. The exact number of people in the world affected is not known. Men are affected more than women. The first natural human case of talaromycosis was reported in 1973 in an American minister with Hodgkin's disease who lived in Southeast Asia.

== Signs and symptoms ==
There may be no symptoms, or talaromycosis may present with small painless skin lesions. The head and neck are most often affected. Other features include: fever, general discomfort, weight loss, cough, difficulty breathing, diarrhoea, abdominal pain, swelling of the spleen (splenomegaly), liver swelling (hepatomegaly), swollen lymph nodes (lymphadenopathy), and anemia. There may be no symptoms.

In those without HIV infection, the lungs, liver, and mouth are usually affected, with systemic infection rarely occurring. The skin lesions are also often smooth. The disease tends to present differently in those with HIV infection; they are more likely to experience widespread infection. Their skin lesions however, are usually dented in the centre and can appear similar to molluscum contagiosum.

== Cause ==
Talaromycosis is usually caused by T. marneffei, however, other species of the Talaromyces genus are also known to cause the disease in rare cases.

=== Risk factors ===
Talaromycosis rarely affects healthy people and generally occurs in people who are already sick and unable to fight infection such as HIV/AIDS, cancer, organ transplant, long-term steroid use, old age, malnutrition or autoimmune disease.

== Mechanism ==
The infection is thought to be acquired through breathing in the organism from the environment. However, the exact source of infection is not known. The infection is not spread person-to-person. In Thailand, talaromycosis is more common during the rainy season; rain may promote the proliferation of the fungus in the environment.

== Diagnosis ==
There is no accurate fast serological test. Diagnosis relies on identifying Talaromyces marneffei in cultures from clinical specimens such as sputum, blood, skin scrapings, lymph node, and bone marrow, by which time the disease is in the late-stage. Fungi in blood are found in half of case.

Non-specific laboratory findings may show evidence of the fungus invading tissue, such as low platelets due to bone marrow infiltration, and elevated transaminases due to liver involvement.

Biopsies of skin lesions, lymph nodes, and bone marrow demonstrate the presence of organisms on histopathology. Intracellular and extracellular forms are oval and have a characteristic transverse septum. In culture, colonies are powdery green and produce red pigment; however, cultures are negative in a significant number of cases.

Medical imaging may reveal shadows in the lungs.

=== Differential diagnosis ===
The disease can look similar to tuberculosis and histoplasmosis

== Treatment ==
Talaromycosis may be prevented in people at high risk, using the antifungal medication itraconazole, and is treatable with amphotericin B followed by itraconazole or voriconazole.

== Outcomes ==
With treatment, less than 25% of those affected die. Without treatment, more than 75% will die.

== Epidemiology ==
The exact number of people in the world affected is not known. Once considered rare, its occurrence increased due to HIV/AIDS to become the third most common opportunistic infection (after extrapulmonary tuberculosis and cryptococcosis) in HIV-positive individuals within the endemic area of Southeast Asia. While incidence in those with HIV began to decrease due to antiretroviral treatment, the number of cases in those without HIV began to rise in some endemic areas since the mid-1990s, likely due to improved diagnosis and an increase in other conditions that reduce immunity. The disease has been found to be more common in young farmers. Men are affected more than women.

== History ==
T. marneffei was first isolated from a bamboo rat in Vietnam in 1956. Three years later, it was described by Gabriel Segretain as a new species with disease potential. The first natural human case of talaromycosis was reported in 1973 in an American minister with Hodgkin's disease who lived in Southeast Asia.

== Research ==
An antigen assay has been developed to detect a key virulence factor Mp1p that has been shown to have a high specificity for Talaromyces marneffei.
