= Alanine aminotransferase 2 =

Enzyme found in humans

GPT2

Identifiers
- Aliases: GPT2, ALT2, GPT 2, MRT49, glutamic pyruvate transaminase (alanine aminotransferase) 2, glutamic--pyruvic transaminase 2, NEDSPM
- External IDs: OMIM: 138210; MGI: 1915391; GeneCards: GPT2
Available structures
PDB	Ortholog search: PDBe RCSB
PDB	List of PDB id codes 3IHJ
Enzyme activity
EC #	BRENDA	ExPASy	KEGG	MetaCyc
2.6.1.2	↗	↗	↗	↗

Gene location (Human)
Chr.	Chromosome 16 (human)
Band	16q11.2	Start	46,884,362 bp
Band	16q11.2	End	46,931,289 bp

Gene location (Mouse)
Chr.	Chromosome 8 (mouse)
Band	8|8 C3	Start	86,219,205 bp
Band	8|8 C3	End	86,254,189 bp
RNA expression pattern
Bgee	Human / Mouse (ortholog); Top expressed in: body of pancreas; muscle of thigh; right lobe of liver; ventricular zone; amygdala; skeletal muscle tissue; vastus lateralis muscle; minor salivary glands; gastrocnemius muscle; Skeletal muscle tissue of biceps brachii / Top expressed in: lacrimal gland; muscle of thigh; gastrocnemius muscle; seminal vesicula; triceps brachii muscle; vastus lateralis muscle; medial head of gastrocnemius muscle; cheek; parotid gland; temporal muscle; More reference expression data
BioGPS	n/a
Gene ontology
Molecular function	transferase activity; L-alanine:2-oxoglutarate aminotransferase activity; pyridoxal phosphate binding; catalytic activity; transaminase activity
Cellular component	mitochondrial matrix
Biological process	L-alanine catabolic process; cellular amino acid biosynthetic process; L-alanine metabolic process; 2-oxoglutarate metabolic process; biosynthetic process
Sources:Amigo / QuickGO
Orthologs
Databases	NCBI: entry; OMA: entry
Species	Human	Mouse
Entrez	84706	108682
Ensembl	ENSG00000166123	ENSMUSG00000031700
UniProt	Q8TD30	Q8BGT5
RefSeq (mRNA)	NM_133443; NM_001142466	NM_173866
RefSeq (protein)	NP_001135938; NP_597700	NP_776291
Location (UCSC)	Chr 16: 46.88 – 46.93 Mb	Chr 8: 86.22 – 86.25 Mb
PubMed search
- Wikidata
View/Edit Human	View/Edit Mouse

Alanine aminotransferase 2 (ALT2), also called glutamic—pyruvic transaminase 2 is a protein that in humans is encoded by the GPT2 gene.

== Function ==
This gene encodes a mitochondrial alanine transaminase, a pyridoxal enzyme that catalyzes the reversible transamination between alanine and 2-oxoglutarate to generate pyruvate and glutamate. Alanine transaminases play roles in gluconeogenesis and amino acid metabolism in many tissues including skeletal muscle, kidney, and liver. Activating transcription factor 4 upregulates this gene under metabolic stress conditions in hepatocyte cell lines. A loss of function mutation in this gene has been associated with developmental encephalopathy. Alternative splicing results in multiple transcript variants. [provided by RefSeq, Apr 2015].
