= Mononuclear phagocyte system =

Part of the immune system

In immunology, the mononuclear phagocyte system or mononuclear phagocytic system (MPS), also known as the macrophage system, is a part of the immune system that consists of the phagocytic cells located in reticular connective tissue. The cells are primarily monocytes and macrophages, and they accumulate in lymph nodes and the spleen. The Kupffer cells of the liver and tissue histiocytes are also part of the MPS. The mononuclear phagocyte system and the monocyte macrophage system refer to two different entities, often mistakenly understood as one.

"Reticuloendothelial system" is an older term for the mononuclear phagocyte system, but it is used less commonly now, as it is understood that most endothelial cells are not macrophages.

The mononuclear phagocyte system is also a somewhat dated concept trying to combine a broad range of cells, and should be used with caution.

== Cell types and locations ==
The spleen is the second largest unit of the mononuclear phagocyte system. The monocyte is formed in the bone marrow and transported by the blood; it migrates into the tissues, where it transforms into a histiocyte or a macrophage.

Macrophages are diffusely scattered in the connective tissue and in liver (Kupffer cells), spleen and lymph nodes (sinus histiocytes), lungs (alveolar macrophages), and central nervous system (microglia). The half-life of blood monocytes is about 1 day, whereas the life span of tissue macrophages is several months or years. The mononuclear phagocyte system is part of both humoral and cell-mediated immunity. The mononuclear phagocyte system has an important role in defense against microorganisms, including mycobacteria, fungi, bacteria, protozoa, and viruses. Macrophages remove senescent erythrocytes, leukocytes, and megakaryocytes by phagocytosis and digestion.

Cell Name	Location
Adipose tissue macrophages	Adipose tissue
Monocyte	Bone Marrow/Blood
Kupffer cell	Liver
Sinus histiocytes	Lymph node
Alveolar macrophage (dust cell)	Pulmonary alveolus of Lungs
Tissue macrophages (Histiocyte) leading to Giant cells	Connective Tissues
Langerhans cell	Skin and Mucosa
Microglia	Central Nervous System
Hofbauer cell	Placenta
Intraglomerular mesangial cell	Kidney
Epithelioid histiocyte	Granulomas
Red Pulp Macrophage (Sinusoidal lining cells)	Red pulp of Spleen
Peritoneal macrophages	Peritoneal cavity
Osteoclast	Bone

== Functions ==
- Formation of new red blood cells (RBCs) and white blood cells (WBCs).
- Destruction of senescent RBCs.
- Formation of plasma proteins.
- Formation of bile pigments.
- Storage of iron. In the liver, Kupffer cells store excess iron from catabolism of heme from the breakdown of red blood cells. In bone marrow and spleen, iron is stored in MPS cells mostly as ferritin; in iron overload states, most of the iron is stored as hemosiderin.
- Clearance of heparin via heparinases.

== Hematopoiesis ==
The various cell types of the mononuclear phagocyte system are all part of the myeloid lineage from the CFU-GEMM (precursor of granulocytes, erythrocytes, monocytes and megakaryocytes).
