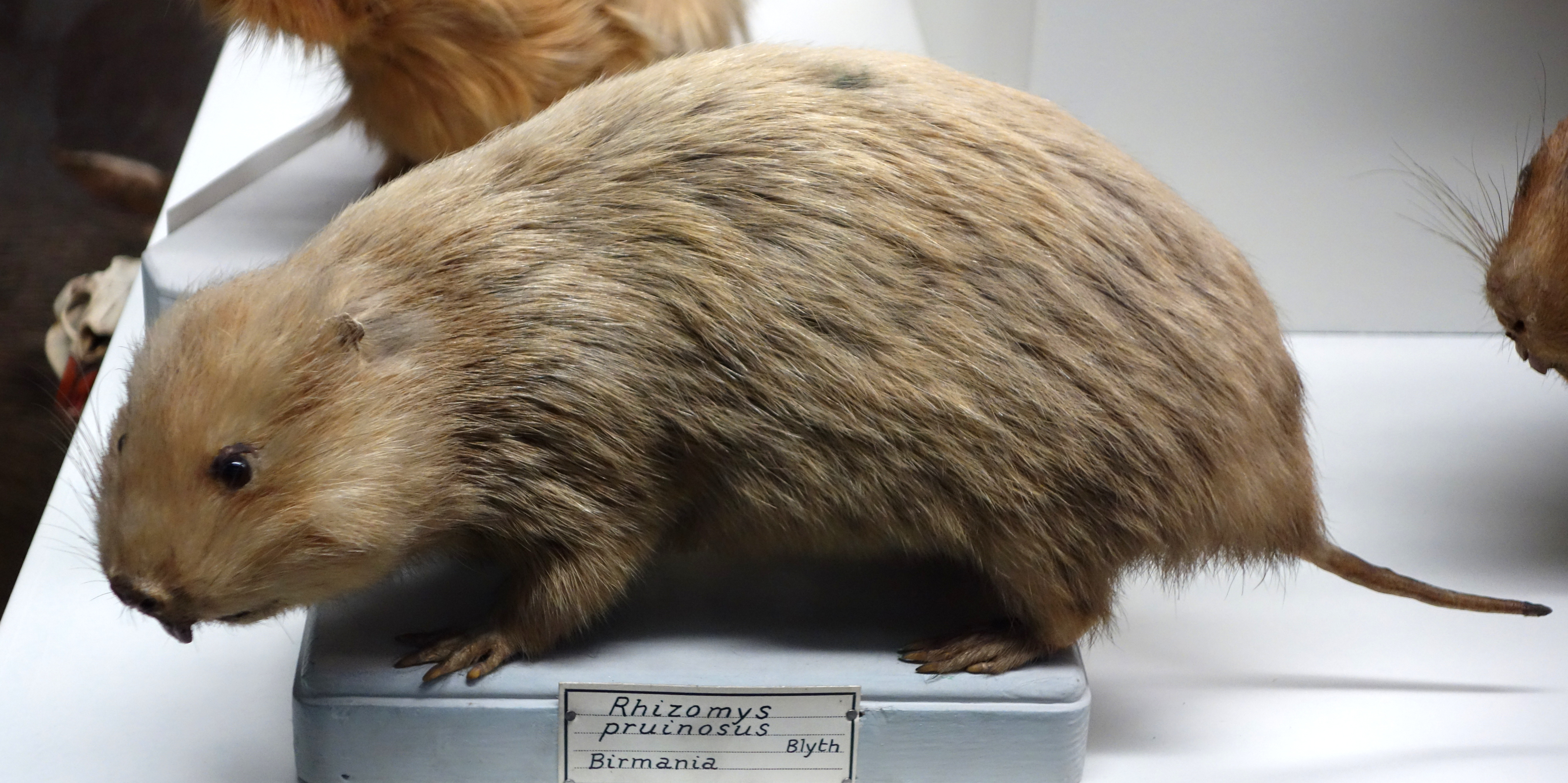

Conservation status
- Least Concern (IUCN 3.1)

Scientific classification
- Kingdom: Animalia
- Phylum: Chordata
- Class: Mammalia
- Order: Rodentia
- Family: Spalacidae
- Genus: Rhizomys
- Species: R. pruinosus

Binomial name
- Rhizomys pruinosus Blyth, 1851
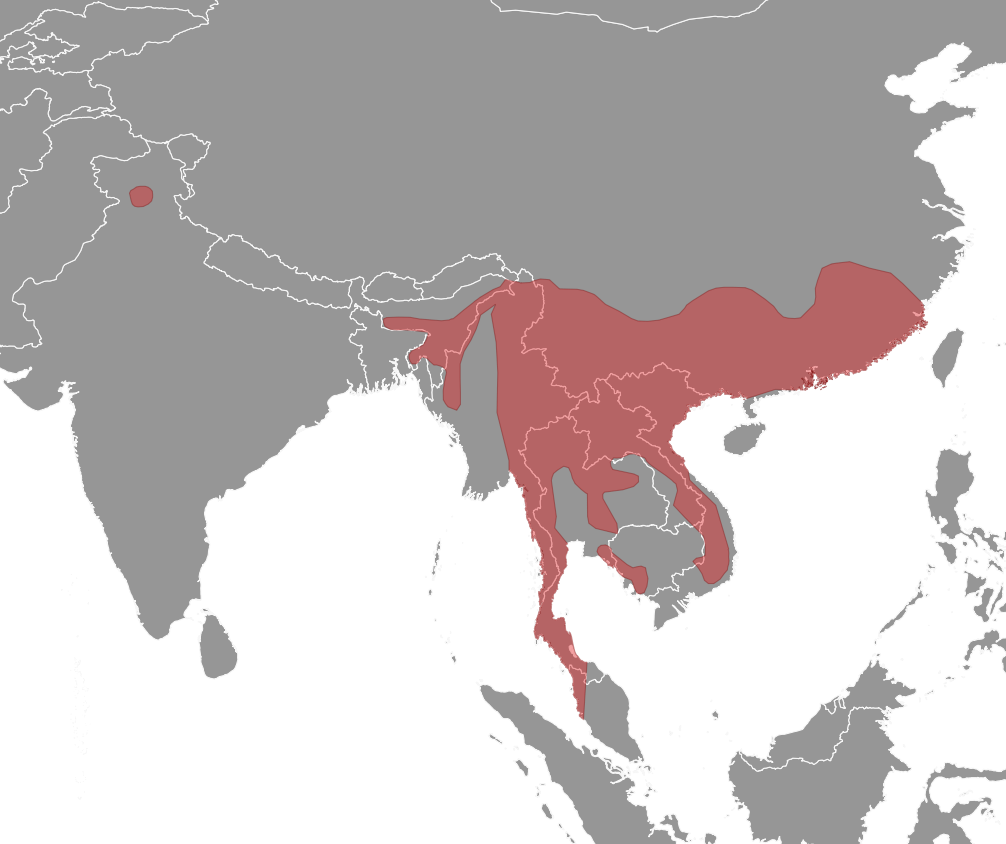

= Hoary bamboo rat =

Species of rodent

The hoary bamboo rat (Rhizomys pruinosus) is a species of rodent in the family Spalacidae found in Southeast Asia (Cambodia, Laos, Malaysia, Myanmar, Thailand, and Vietnam), East Asia (China) and South Asia (India).

== Description ==
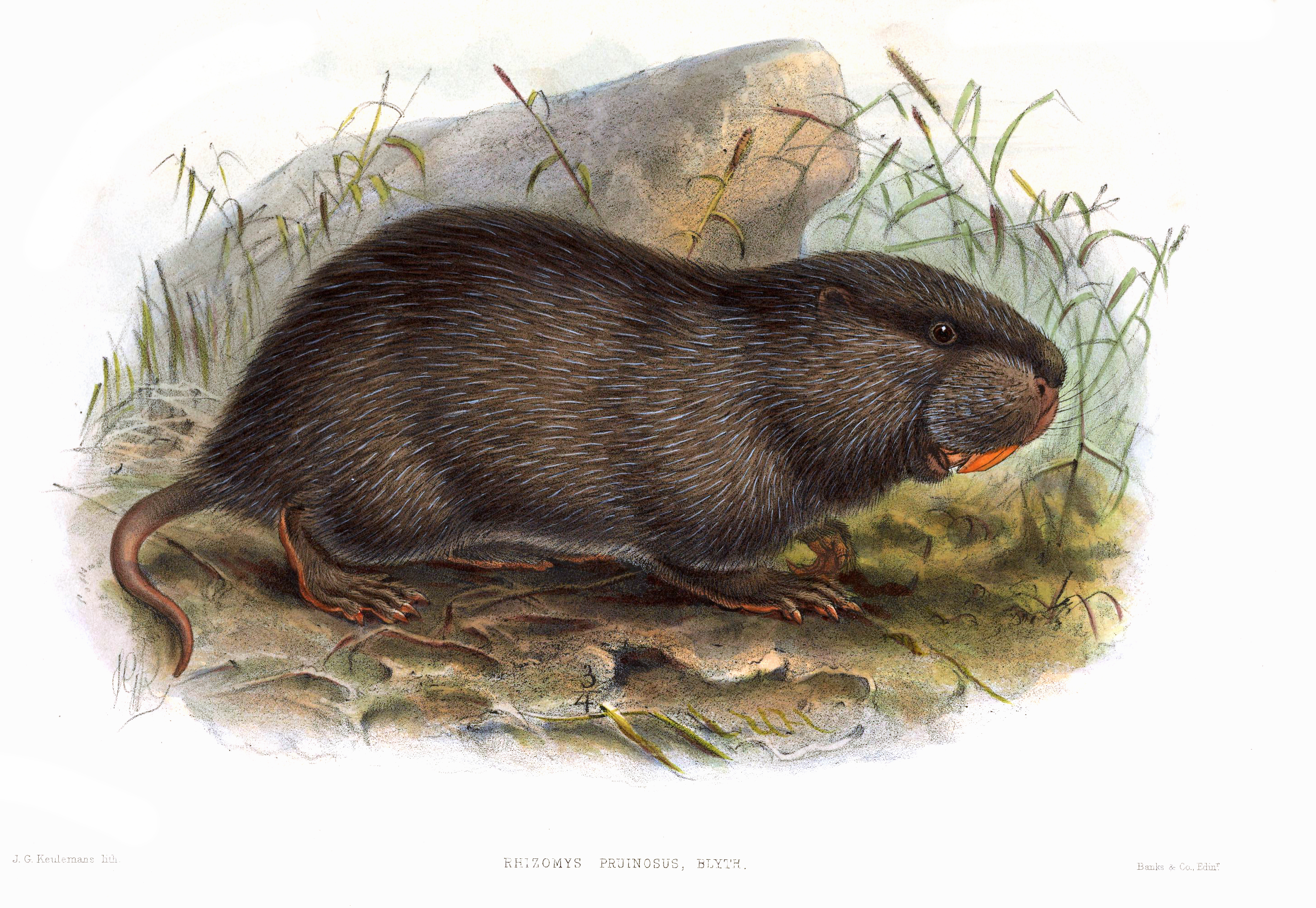

The hoary bamboo rat is a robust rodent that reaches a head-and-body length of 240 to 345 mm (9 to 14 in) with a tail of 90 to 130 mm (4 to 5 in). Its weight ranges from 1,500 to 2,500 g (53 to 88 oz). The fur on the upper parts is greyish-brown or dark brown with a somewhat grizzled appearance due to the presence of white-tipped guard hairs. The under parts are paler greyish-brown and the tail is scantily haired. The skull is broad and somewhat flattened and the zygomatic arch is large. The upper incisors slope inwards and the broad molars are an orange colour.

== Distribution and habitat ==
The hoary bamboo rat has a wide range which includes northern and north-eastern India, eastern Myanmar, Thailand, Laos, Cambodia, Vietnam, the Malay Peninsula, and southern China. It occurs from low ground to altitudes of 4,000 m (13,120 ft) above sea level. It occurs in a variety of habitats including coniferous and mixed woodland, secondary forest, shrubby land bordering woodland, plantations, and bamboo thickets. It is generally absent from dense forests and from cultivated land.

== Behaviour ==
This rat is nocturnal and lives alone in a simple burrow, which has a single entrance marked by a mound, an escape exit, a nest chamber, and latrine chamber. The nest is lined with dried grasses and shreds of bamboo. The bamboo rat emerges at night to forage for plant material, mostly feeding on the stems and roots of bamboos and beard grass. Breeding may take place all year round, but it peaks in November/December and March/June. At these times, a male bamboo rat moves into the burrow of a female. The gestation period is about 22 days and the litter size is usually between one and five. Weaning takes place when the young are about two or two and a half months.
