= Liver cytology =

Branch of cytology studying liver cells

Liver cytology is the branch of cytology that studies the liver cells and its functions. The liver is a vital organ, in charge of almost all the body’s metabolism. Main liver cells are hepatocytes, Kupffer cells, and hepatic stellate cells; each one with a specific function.

== Definitions ==
Cytology is the name given to the branch of biology that deals with the formation, structure and functionality of the cells. Liver cytology specializes in the study of liver cells. The main liver cells are called hepatocytes; however, there are other cells that can be observed in a liver sample such as Kupffer cells (macrophages). The liver is the biggest gland of the body. It has a wide variety of functions that range from the destruction of old blood cells to the control of the whole metabolism of macromolecules. In the fetus, the liver works as a principal center for hematopoiesis, function that is later replaced by the bone marrow. This hematopoietic function is not normally seen after birth; however, in certain pathological conditions this function may still be seen. The liver is an essential organ, and it is the only one in the body that has the ability to regenerate itself after surgery or damage.

== Obtaining samples ==
Since cytology deals with tissues, which are composed of cells, samples of tissues must be obtained in order to analyze the cells. There are several ways of obtaining a sample, the first is through dissecting a corpse, with a sample of tissue taken during an autopsy. The second is performing an aspirate (bone marrow, cerebrospinal fluid, etc.). To perform an aspirate in liquid tissues, a needle is inserted inside the body and a sample is extracted. Another common method is surgery, with a piece being removed during the procedure for later analysis. Finally, another common method is biopsy. In a biopsy, a needle is inserted into the skin and a solid sample of tissue is obtained.

After the sample is obtained, it has to be processed by different methods depending on the nature of the sample. Liquid samples, such as blood, are extracted and dried out, while solid samples must be dehydrated using a different combination of alcoholic compounds. The tissue must also be stained, usually with haematoxylin and eosin, a pair of colorants that identify the acidic-basic nature of the cells. After this treatment the samples are analyzed under a microscope, which can be optical or electronic, to determine if the sample is normal or pathological.

== Hepatocytes ==
The hepatocytes are the parenchymal cells of the liver, which form the lobules. They are intimately associated with the sinusoids, which are a network of capillaries. Since they are metabolically active cells, their cytoplasm has many organelles.

Hepatocytes are the main cells of the liver. They are large polyhedral cells, with six surfaces, three of which have a relevant function. The three relevant type of surfaces are sinusoidal, canalicular and intercellular. These surfaces are involved in the exchange of substances between the hepatocyte, the vessels and the biliar canaliculi. The sinusoidal surfaces are separated from the sinusoids because of the perisinusoidal space. They represent 70% of the total hepatocyte surface. They are coated by microvilli which emerge to the perisinusoidal space. These surfaces are the place where the exchange of substances between the hepatocytes and the sinusoids occurs. The canalicular surfaces are the ones through which bile drains from the hepatocytes to the canaliculi. They represent 15% of the surface of the cell. The cytoplasm of the hepatocyte near canaliculi is rich in actin filaments, and they are probably capable of modifying the canaliculi’s diameter, thus influencing the flow; however this is not yet proven. The intercellular surfaces are the ones that are between two adjacent hepatocytes and they are not in contact with sinusoids or canaliculi. These are simple surfaces specialized in the cellular adherence and in the communication between hepatocytes through gap junctions.

Hepatocytes measure between 20 and 30 μm in each dimension. They are in charge of developing all the functions of the liver such as the metabolism of lipids, carbohydrates and proteins, as well as the processing of hormones and drugs. Hepatocytes constitute about 80% of the cell population of the liver, with the other 20% being occupied by Kupffer cells, hepatic stellate cells, endothelial cells and mesothelial cells, which are not exactly characteristic of the liver, but are present in the liver samples.

Histologically speaking, hepatocytes have specific characteristics. Their nuclei are large and spheroidal, occupying the center of the cell. There is at least one nucleolus in each nucleus. In the adult liver, most of the cells are binucleated, and most of the hepatocytes are tetraploid, which means that they have four times the amount of normal DNA. Their average lifespan is from approximately five months, and hepatocytes have a significant regeneration capacity after parenchymal loss by toxic processes, diseases or surgeries. Their cytoplasm is mostly acidophilic. Basophilic regions correspond to the RER and free ribosomes. Mitochondria are abundant in hepatocytes, from 800 to 1000 per cell. They can be detected using Janus green B or enzimo-histochemistry. Hepatocytes possess multiple Golgi complexes, and have large numbers of peroxisomes, which can be detected with immunohistochemistry. Smooth endoplasmic reticulum can be extensive and may contain enzymes involved in degradation and conjugation of toxins and drugs, and other enzymes involved in the synthesis of cholesterol and lipoproteins.

== Kupffer cells ==
Liver sinusoids are different from the rest of the body’s sinusoids since they have macrophage cells intercalated in between their endothelial cells. Kupffer cells have a different embryological origin, coming from the myeloid line in the reticuloendohelial system (also called mononuclear phagocyte system) and are related to the immune system. They first develop in the bone marrow and then migrate to the liver where they differentiate into Kupffer cells. In fact, they are the macrophages of the liver and are located in the sinusoids. Sinusoids are vascular channels that receive blood from terminal branches of the hepatic artery and portal vein and make it flow to the central veins. The space located between the endothelium is known as the Disse Space. Histologically speaking, Kupffer cells are difficult to identify; however, they are easily seen if there are stained particles that were phagocytosed. The main function of the Kupffer cells is the destruction of old blood cells that go through the liver.

== Hepatic stellate cells ==
In the perisinusoidal space, a different type of cells can be found. These cells are characteristic of the liver, since they are not found in any other tissue. These hepatic stellate cells, also named lipocytes, have lipid drops in their cytosol. It is thought that these drops store a fraction of the body’s vitamin A supply. Hepatic stellate cells rest over the Remak trabecules, and they emit extensions to the sinusoids.
