= Zallinger =

Zallinger is a surname. Notable people with the surname include:

- Jacob Anton Zallinger zum Thurn (1735–1813), German philosopher and canonist
- Rudolph F. Zallinger (1919–1995), American-based Austrian-Russian artist
- Meinhard von Zallinger (1897–1990), Austrian conductor

== See also ==
- Zollinger
