= PASC =

PASC may refer to:

== Science and technology ==
- Pancreatic stellate cell (PaSC)
- PASC audio compression, a version of MPEG-1 Audio Layer I
- Post-acute sequelae of COVID-19 or post-acute sequelae of SARS-CoV-2, commonly known as long COVID

== Other uses ==
- Deadhorse Airport (ICAO code: PASC), Alaska, US
- Port Adelaide Soccer Club, Adelaide, South Australia
- Portable Applications Standards Committee, of the IEEE Computer Society
- Public Administration Select Committee, in the British Parliament
