= Kupffer cell =

Macrophages located in the liver

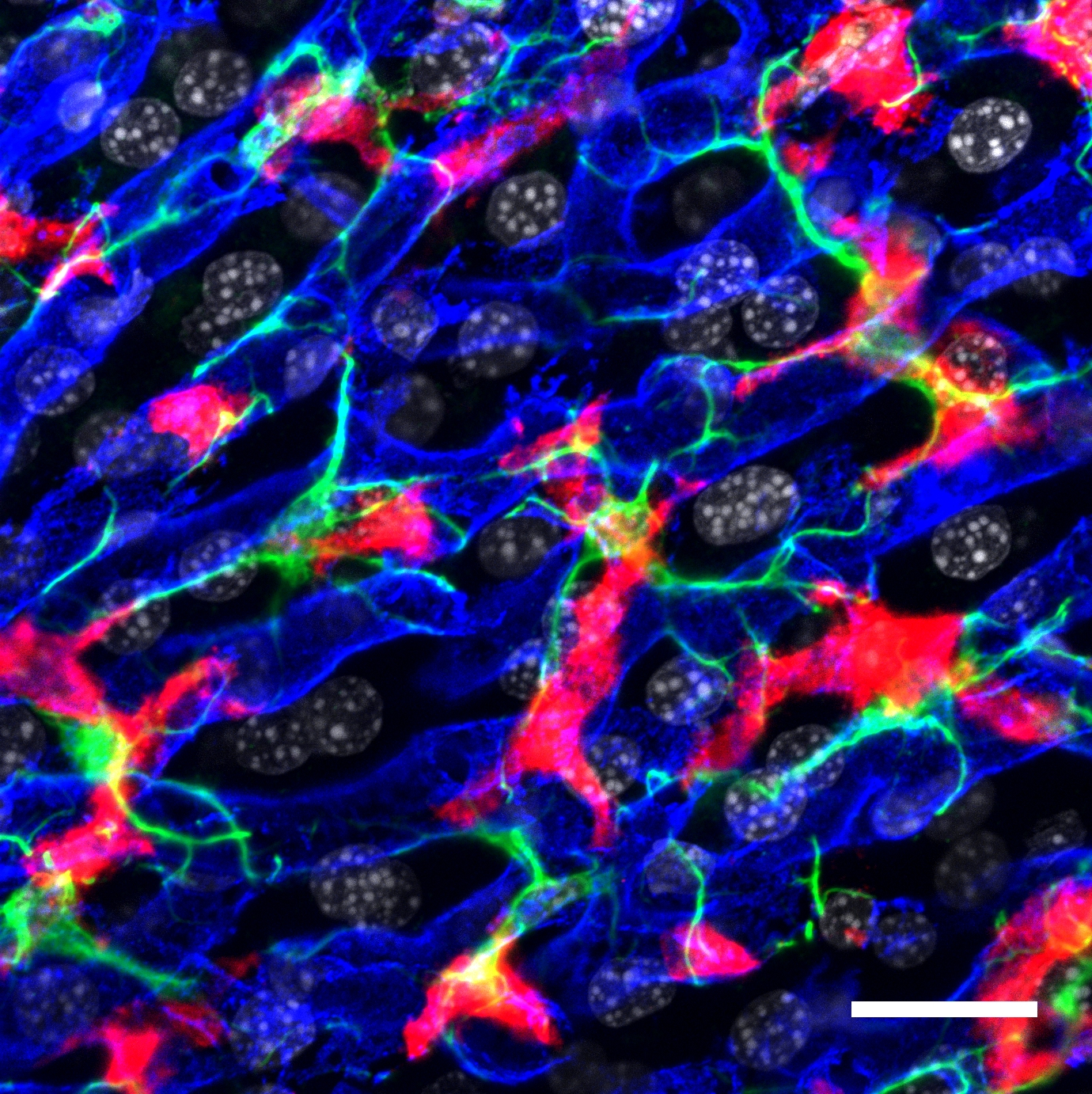
- Confocal microscopy picture showing the steady-state location and interactions between Kupffer cells (Red), hepatic stellate cells (green) and liver sinusoidal endothelial cells (blue). Cell nuclei are in grey.

- Basic liver structure

Details
- Location: Liver
- Function: Macrophage

Identifiers
- Latin: macrophagocytus stellatus
- MeSH: D007728
- TH: H3.04.05.0.00016
- FMA: 14656

Kupffer cells, also known as stellate macrophages and Kupffer–Browicz cells, are specialized cells localized in the liver within the lumen of the liver sinusoids and are adhesive to their endothelial cells which make up the blood vessel walls. Kupffer cells comprise the largest population of tissue-resident macrophages in the body. Gut bacteria, bacterial endotoxins, and microbial debris transported to the liver from the gastrointestinal tract via the portal vein will first come in contact with Kupffer cells, the first immune cells in the liver. It is because of this that any change to Kupffer cell functions can be connected to various liver diseases such as alcoholic liver disease, viral hepatitis, intrahepatic cholestasis, steatohepatitis, activation or rejection of the liver during liver transplantation and liver fibrosis. They form part of the mononuclear phagocyte system.

== Location and structure ==
Kupffer cells can be found in the sinusoidal space attached to the luminal side of sinusoidal endothelial cells. They are more numerous in the periportal regions than the pericentral regions of the hepatic lobules. Kupffer cell function and structures are specialized depending on their location. Periportal Kupffer cells tend to be larger and have more lysosomal enzyme and phagocytic activity, whereas centrilobular Kupffer cells create more superoxide radical.

Kupffer cells are amoeboid in character, with surface features including microvilli, pseudopodia and lamellipodia, which project in every direction. The microvilli and pseudopodia play a role in the endocytosis of particles.

The nucleus is indented and ovoid, and can be lobulated.

Notable cytoplasmic elements include ribosomes, Golgi complexes, centrioles, microtubules and microfilaments. Kupffer cells also contain rough endoplasmic reticulum, a nuclear envelope, and annulate lamellae, all of which demonstrate peroxidase activity.

Importantly, Kupffer cells express the SR-AI/II scavenger receptor. This receptor is involved in recognising and binding the lipid A domain of lipopolysaccharide (LPS) and lipoteichoic acid. (LPS is a bacterial endotoxin which is found in the cell wall gram-negative bacteria, whereas lipoteichoic acid is present in gram-positive bacteria.) Because of this detection system, Kupffer cells play a critical role in initiating and mediating immune responses to bacterial infection of the liver.

== Development ==
Development of an initial population of Kupffer cells begins in the embryonic yolk sac where precursor cells differentiate into fetal macrophages. Once they enter the blood stream, they migrate to the fetal liver where they stay. There they complete their differentiation into Kupffer cells, which is dependent on the induction of the transcription factor Id3. Other transcription factors that maintain Kupffer cell identity are Id1 and Nr1h3 (Lxr).

Under normal conditions, these Kupffer cell populations are long-lived and self-renewing. However, if resident Kupffer cell populations are depleted, monocytes derived from hematopoietic stem cells in the bone marrow transported through blood circulation to the liver can also fully differentiate into true Kupffer cells. Unlike other tissue macrophages, which must be continually renewed by circulating monocytes, these monocyte-derived Kupffer cells are capable of self-renewal once a population is established.

Development of mature Kupffer cells is regulated by numerous growth factors, with macrophage colony-stimulating factor (CSF1) playing a key role. Cytokines involved in type 2 inflammation, such as IL-4, may also stimulate Kupffer cell proliferation. A time frame of 14 to 21 days for complete replenishment of Kupffer cell populations has been demonstrated in animal studies. Despite high monocyte influx and maturation rates, hepatic Kupffer cell populations are tightly maintained. Evidently, there is a high rate of turnover, with the average lifespan of a Kupffer cell estimated at 3.8 days. However, the ultimate fate of Kupffer cells in vivo is not yet fully understood.

== Function ==
The primary function of the Kupffer cell is to remove foreign debris and particles that have come from the hepatic portal system when passing through the liver. It is possible for the Kupffer cells to take in large particles by phagocytosis and smaller particles via pinocytosis. Kupffer cells are integral in the innate responses of the immune system. They are important for host defense and play a role in the metabolism of many different compounds including, lipids, protein complexes and small particles. They are also useful in removing apoptotic cells from circulation.

The amount of Kupffer cells in the liver is held constant. Kupffer cells have a proliferative capacity, allowing for cell populations to replenish themselves: this is in complete contrast to monocyte-derived macrophages that have no proliferative potential. Old or defective cells are removed through apoptosis, as well as through being phagocytized by neighbouring Kupffer cells.

Kupffer cells are heterogeneous in their function, dependent on their location in the liver lobules. Cells in the periportal zone are directly exposed to bloodflow, and express greater lysosomal activity to more efficiently process incoming foreign substances. In contrast, cells in the centrilobular zone experience less perfusion, and are equipped with greater stores of superoxide to combat deeply-penetrating injuries and infections.

In response to infection or irritation, Kupffer cells can produce inflammatory cytokines, TNF-alpha, oxygen radicals, and proteases. Excessive production of these mediators is linked to the development of liver injury.

Apart from clearing bacteria, Kupffer cells are also responsible for recycling hemoglobin by destroying senescent red blood cells through phagocytic action. The globin chains are re-used, while the iron-containing portion, heme, is further broken down into iron, which is re-used, and bilirubin, which is conjugated to glucuronic acid within hepatocytes and secreted into the bile.

Helmy et al. identified a receptor present in Kupffer cells, the complement receptor of the immunoglobulin family (CRIg). Mice without CRIg could not clear complement system-coated pathogens. CRIg is conserved in mice and humans and is a critical component of the innate immune system.

Kupffer cells are one of the main sources of plasma Cholesteryl ester transfer protein (CETP), which regulates plasma levels of High-density lipoprotein and Very low-density lipoprotein. Kupffer cells also perform arachidonic acid metabolism and are a major source of prostanoids in the liver.

== Clinical significance ==
Kupffer cells are incredibly plastic cells that have the capability to polarize specific activation states and can perform different functions in different microenvironments. M1 (classical activation) and M2 (alternative activation) designate the two extremes of macrophage polarization. M1-polarized Kupffer cells produce a large amount of pro-inflammatory cytokines like TNF-alpha. On the other hand, M2-polarized Kupffer cells produce a large quantity of anti-inflammatory mediators, for example, IL-10.

Kupffer cells play a role in the pathogenesis of a damaged liver in response to sepsis. The macrophages in the liver activate and release both IL-1 and TNF-alpha. In turn, this activates leukocytes and sinusoidal endothelial cells to express ICAM-1. This results in tissue damage to the endothelium because of proteases, oxygen radicals, prostanoids and other substances from leukocytes.

Kupffer cell activation contributes to pathogenesis of both chronic and acute alcoholic liver disease in response to ethanol-induced liver injury, common in chronic alcoholics. Chronic alcoholism and liver injury deal with a two-hit system. While the first hit is direct, mediated by the direct toxicity of ethanol and its metabolic byproducts, the second hit is indirect, mediated by increased uptake of lipopolysaccharide (endotoxin) from the intestine.

Ethanol increases permeability of the intestinal epithelium, resulting in endotoxin produced by the intestinal flora leaking from the intestinal lumen into the liver via the portal vein. The presence of endotoxin induces a strong M1 polarization of Kupffer cells. A large amount of reactive oxygen species, pro-inflammatory cytokines and chemokines are produced by the activated Kupffer cells which lead to liver injury.

The cascade begins with endotoxin-mediated activation of the Toll-like receptor 4 (TLR4) and CD14, receptors on the Kupffer cell that internalize endotoxin. This in turn activates the transcription of pro-inflammatory cytokines and tumor necrosis factor-alpha (TNFα), with concurrent production of superoxides.

Cytokines and superoxides go on to cause inflammation and oxidizing damage respectively, while TNFα triggers the stellate cells in the liver to initiate collagen synthesis. These processes result in fibrosis, or scarring of the liver. Fibrosis will eventually cause cirrhosis, a loss of function of the liver due to extensive scarring.

== Phylogenetic distribution ==
Kupffer cells have been described in the liver of adult lamprey, indicating the possibility of vertebrate-wide distribution. Kupffer cells in lamprey liver are not as abundant as in mammalian liver. In the adult lamprey, the liver is not the main site of clearance of senescent erythrocytes (a function performed by mammalian Kupffer cells), and lamprey Kupffer cells seem to have a limited role in iron storage. Kupffer cells in lamprey as well as in amphibians contain melanin granules.

== History ==
The cells were first observed by Karl Wilhelm von Kupffer in 1876. The scientist called them "Sternzellen" (star cells or hepatic stellate cell) but thought, inaccurately, that they were an integral part of the endothelium of the liver blood vessels and that they originated from it. In 1898, after several years of research, Tadeusz Browicz identified them, correctly, as macrophages.
