= Toshio Ito =

Japanese anatomist and physician

Toshio Ito (August 5, 1904 – July 6, 1991) was a Japanese anatomist and physician recognized for his discovery of hepatic stellate cells, commonly known as Ito cells. His research provided significant insights into liver microanatomy and its role in hepatic blood flow regulation.

== Early life and education ==
Toshio Ito was born in Aichi, Japan, in 1904, as the third son of a physician. He pursued his medical studies at Keio University, where he undertook postgraduate work in anatomy. During his time at Keio University, he met D.H. Tannerrt, a biologist from Bryn Mawr College, who was serving as an exchange scientist under the auspices of the Rockefeller Foundation. This encounter sparked Ito’s interest in cytology, ultimately leading to his groundbreaking research on hepatic stellate cells.

== Academic career ==
Ito served as Professor of Anatomy at Tokyo Women’s Medical University from 1941 to 1947 and later at Gunma University School of Medicine from 1954 to 1970. His research and teachings influenced generations of medical students and researchers in the field of liver physiology.

== Research ==
In 1950, Ito discovered stellate, fat-storing cells located within the space of Disse. His findings were first published in 1951 in Acta Anatomica Nipponica. Later research confirmed that these cells also store vitamin A and are involved in liver fibrosis when activated.

== See also ==
- Hepatic stellate cell
- Space of Disse
