= Lamella (materials) =

Collections of fine sheets of material held adjacent to one another

A lamella (pl.: lamellae) is a small plate or flake, from the Latin, and may also refer to collections of fine sheets of material held adjacent to one another in a gill-shaped structure, often with fluid in between though sometimes simply a set of "welded" plates. The term is used in biological contexts for thin membranes of plates of tissue. In the context of materials science, the microscopic structures in bone and nacre are called lamellae. Moreover, the term lamella is often used to describe crystal structure of some materials.

== Uses of the term ==
In surface chemistry (especially mineralogy and materials science), lamellar structures are fine layers, alternating between different materials. They can be produced by chemical effects (as in eutectic solidification), biological means, or a deliberate process of lamination, such as pattern welding. Lamellae can also describe the layers of atoms in the crystal lattices of materials such as metals.

In surface anatomy, a lamella is a thin plate-like structure, often one amongst many lamellae very close to one another, with open space between.

In chemical engineering, the term is used for devices such as filters and heat exchangers.

In mycology, a lamella (or gill) is a papery hymenophore rib under the cap of some mushroom species, most often agarics.

The term has been used to describe the construction of lamellar armour, as well as the layered structures that can be described by a lamellar vector field.

In medical professions, especially orthopedic surgery, the term is used to refer to 3D printed titanium technology which is used to create implantable medical devices (in this case, orthopedic implants).

In context of water-treatment, lamellar filters may be referred to as plate filters or tube filters.

This term is used to describe a certain type of ichthyosis, a congenital skin condition. Lamellar Ichthyosis often presents with a "colloidal" membrane at birth. It is characterized by generalized dark scaling.

The term lamella(e) is used in the flooring industry to describe the finished top-layer of an engineered wooden floor. For example, an engineered walnut floor will have several layers of wood and a top walnut lamella.

In archaeology, the term is used for a variety of small flat and thin objects, such as Amulet MS 5236, a very thin gold plate with a stamped text from Ancient Greece in the 6th century BC.

In crystallography, the term was first used by Christopher Chantler and refers to a very thin layer of a perfect crystal, from which curved crystal physics may be derived.

In textile industry, a lamella is a thin metallic strip used alone or wound around a core thread for goldwork embroidery and tapestry weaving.

In September 2010, the U.S. Food and Drug Administration (FDA) announced a recall of two medications which contained "extremely thin glass flakes (lamellae) that are barely visible in most cases. The lamellae result from the interaction of the formulation with glass vials over the shelf life of the product."

== See also ==
- Lamella (cell biology)
- Middle lamella
- Annulate lamella
- Lamella (structure)
