= Zollinger =

Zollinger is a surname. Notable people with the surname include:

- Albin Zollinger (1895–1941), Swiss writer
- Charles A. Zollinger (1838–1893), American Civil War hero
- Friedrich Zollinger (1880–1945), German architect
- Heinrich Zollinger (1818–1859), Swiss botanist
- Janet Zollinger Giele (born 1934), American sociologist
- Robert Zollinger (1903–1992), American surgeon
- Rudi Zollinger (born 1944), Swiss cyclist
- Sabrina Zollinger (born 1993), Swiss ice hockey player
