= Complement receptor of the immunoglobulin family =

Protein family

V-set and immunoglobulin domain containing 4

Identifiers
- Symbol: VSIG4
- NCBI gene: 11326
- HGNC: 17032
- OMIM: 300353
- RefSeq: NM_007268
- UniProt: Q9Y279

Other data
- Locus: Chr. X q12-q13.3
Search for
- Structures: Swiss-model
- Domains: InterPro

Complement receptor of the immunoglobulin family is a protein expressed in Kupffer cells. It is a critical receptor for the phagocytosis of opsonised particles in the blood. It recognizes iC3b (inactivated C3b) deposited on microbial surfaces.

== See also ==
- complement system
- immunoglobulin
