= Lamella (structure) =

Type of roof structure

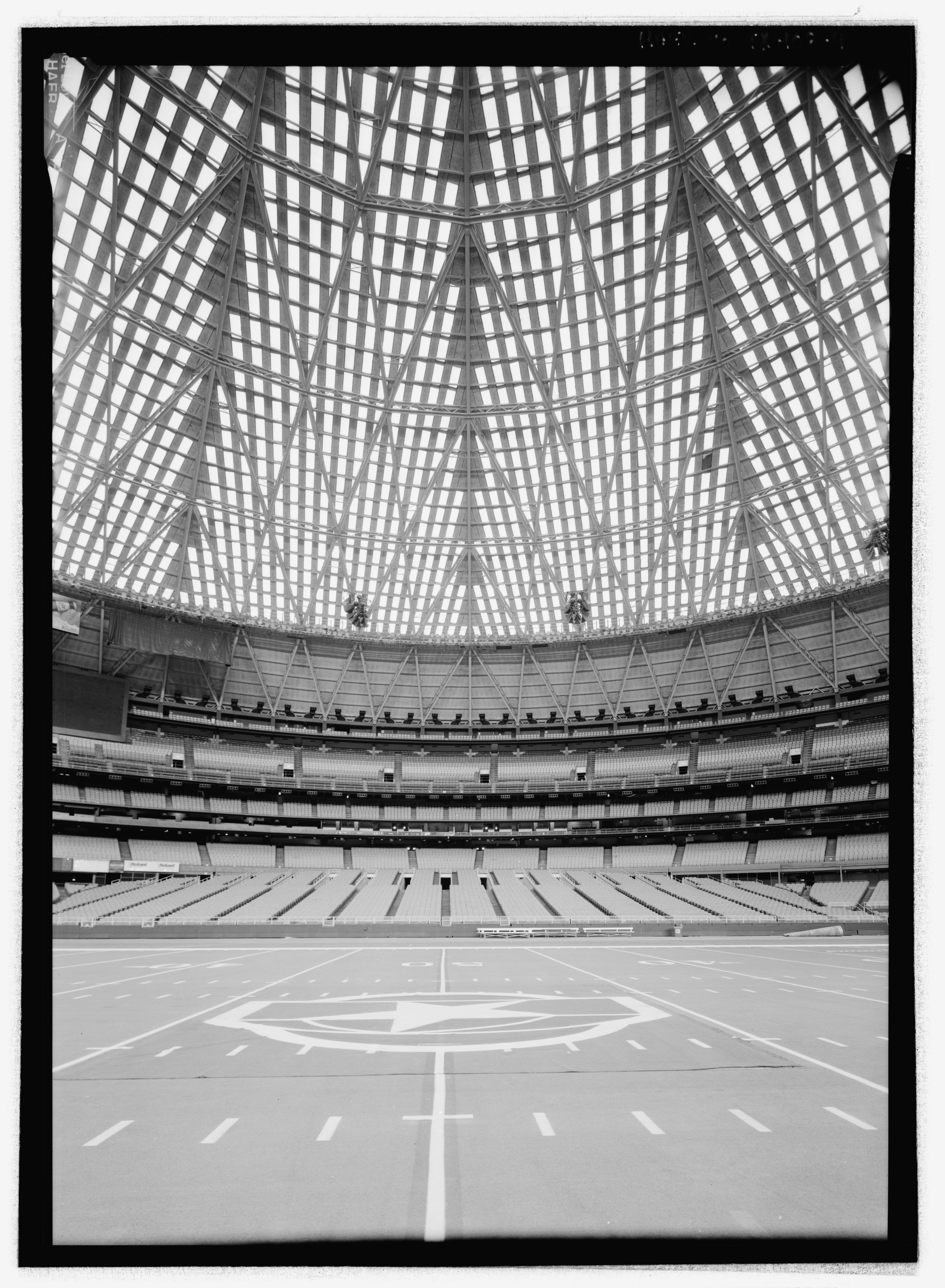
The Houston Astrodome's lamellar truss roof

A lamella roof (also called a Zollinger roof for its inventor, German engineer Friedrich Zollinger) is a construction type where the roof is supported by an arched network of overlapping lamellae in rhombic form. It is a type of gridshell roof.

This roof style was designed by Zollinger to satisfy urban expansion needs, where material costs made new construction cost-prohibitive, but existing buildings could not support additional stories by adding further masonry walls and high-pitched trusses. The vault system comprises short structural members interwoven across a curved surface in a diamond pattern. Lamella structures can be constructed of wood timber or lumber, concrete, or metal. Modern versions of this type of structure include glazed metal-framed systems referred to as "transparent shells".

== See also ==
- Geodesic dome
