= Liver sinusoid =

Hepatic sinusoidal blood vessel

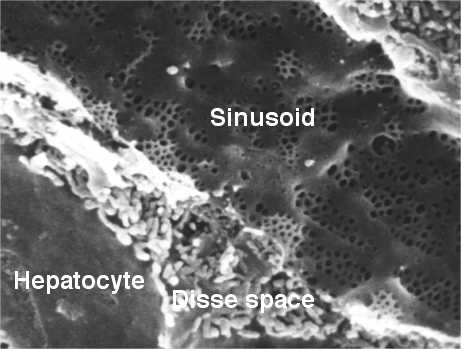
- Sinusoid of a rat liver with fenestrated endothelial cells. Fenestrae are approx 100 nm diameter, and the sinusoidal width 5 µm.

- Basic liver structure

Details
- Drains from: Hepatic portal vein
- Drains to: Central veins of liver

Identifiers
- Latin: vas sinusoideum
- TH: H3.04.05.0.00014
- FMA: 17543

A liver sinusoid is a type of capillary known as a sinusoidal capillary, discontinuous capillary or sinusoid, that is similar to a fenestrated capillary, having discontinuous endothelium that serves as a location for mixing of the oxygen-rich blood from the hepatic artery and the nutrient-rich blood from the portal vein.

The liver sinusoid has a larger caliber than other types of capillaries and has a lining of specialised endothelial cells known as the liver sinusoidal endothelial cells (LSECs), and Kupffer cells. The cells are porous and have a scavenging function. The LSECs make up around half of the non-parenchymal cells in the liver and are flattened and fenestrated. LSECs have many fenestrae that gives easy communication between the sinusoidal lumen and the space of Disse. They play a part in filtration, endocytosis, and in the regulation of blood flow in the sinusoids.

The Kupffer cells can take up and destroy foreign material such as bacteria. Hepatocytes are separated from the sinusoids by the space of Disse. Hepatic stellate cells are present in the space of Disse and are involved in scar formation in response to liver damage.

Defenestration happens when LSECs are lost rendering the sinusoid as an ordinary capillary. This process precedes fibrosis.

== Endothelium ==
The liver sinusoidal endothelial cells are cultured for a variety of research purposes. The utility of these cells are of particular interest. One problem to overcome is the reversing of cellular differentiation that has made these cells highly specialized phenotypically in vitro.

== Additional images ==
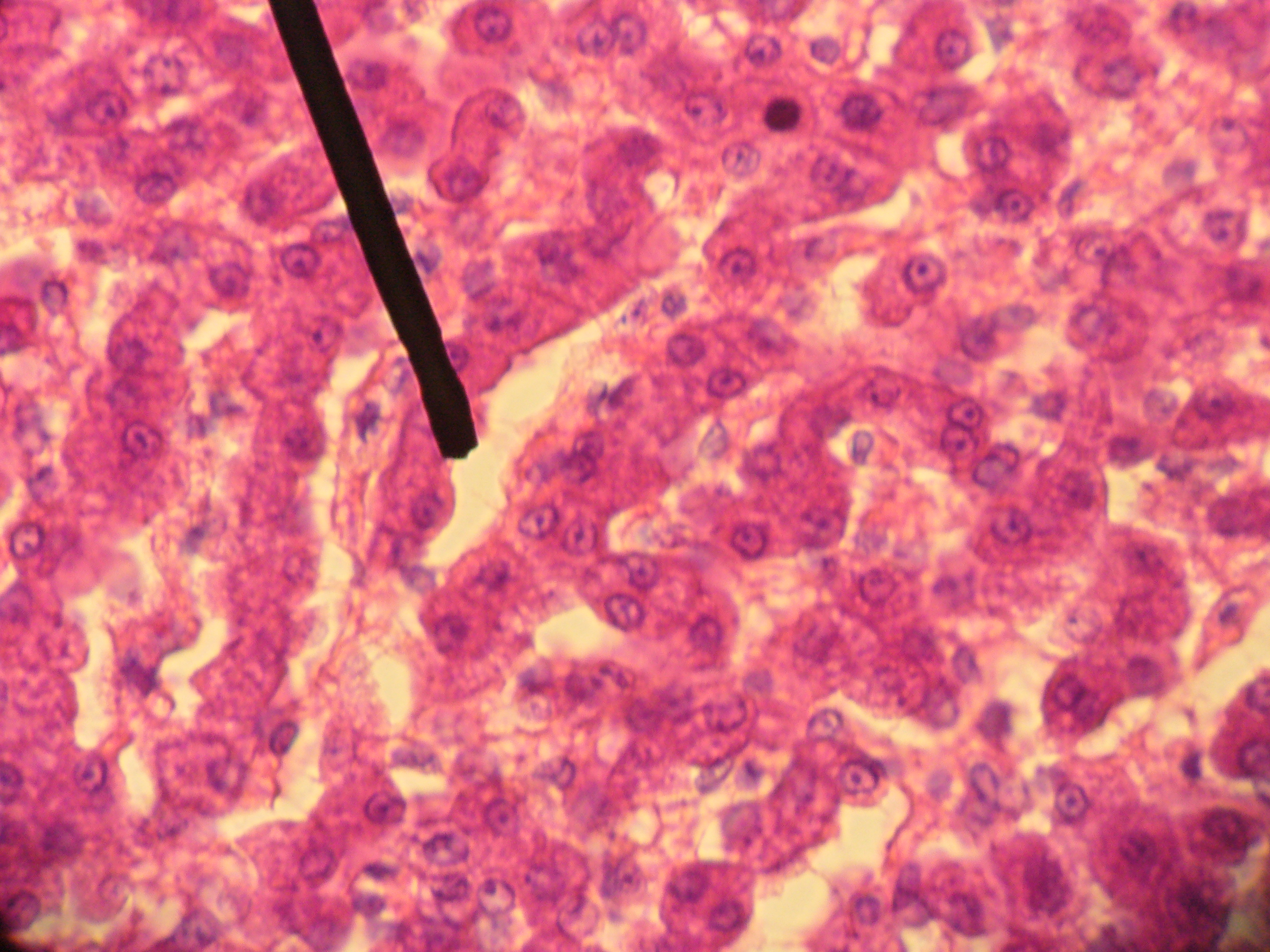
Human liver sinusoid

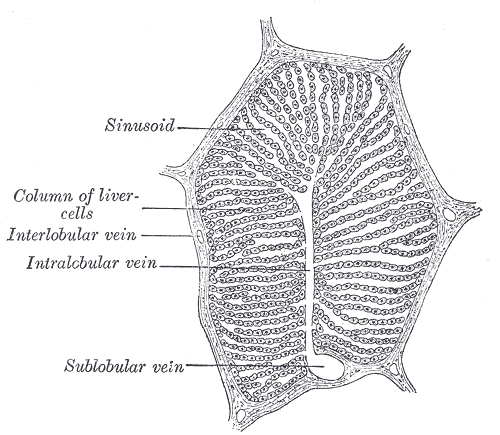
A single lobule of the liver of a pig. X 60.
