= Joseph Disse =

German anatomist and histologist (1852–1912)

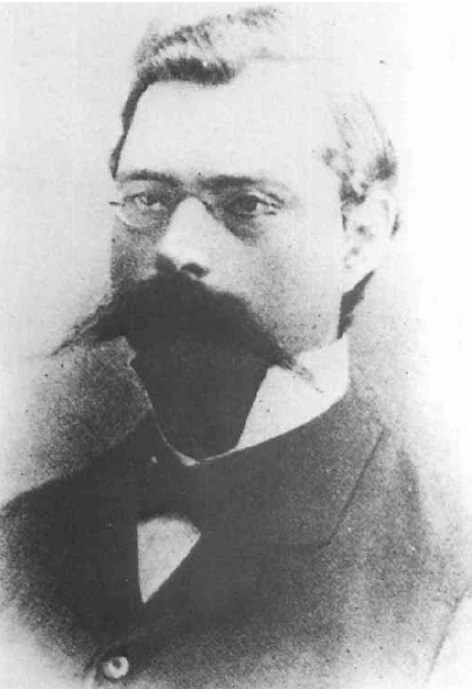
Joseph Disse (1852-1912)

Joseph Hugo Vincenz Disse (25 December 1852 – 9 July 1912) was a German anatomist and histologist born in Brakel, North Rhine-Westphalia.

== Biography ==
Disse studied at the University of Erlangen, and after graduation became an assistant to anatomist Heinrich von Waldeyer-Hartz (1836-1921) at Strassburg. From 1880 to 1888 he was an instructor at the University of Tokyo, and afterwards became an associate professor at the University of Göttingen. From 1895 to 1912 he was a professor at the University of Marburg.

He specialized in the fields of microscopic anatomy, embryology and histology. His name is associated with the "space of Disse", which is a perisinosoidal space of the liver.
