= Pancreatic stellate cell =

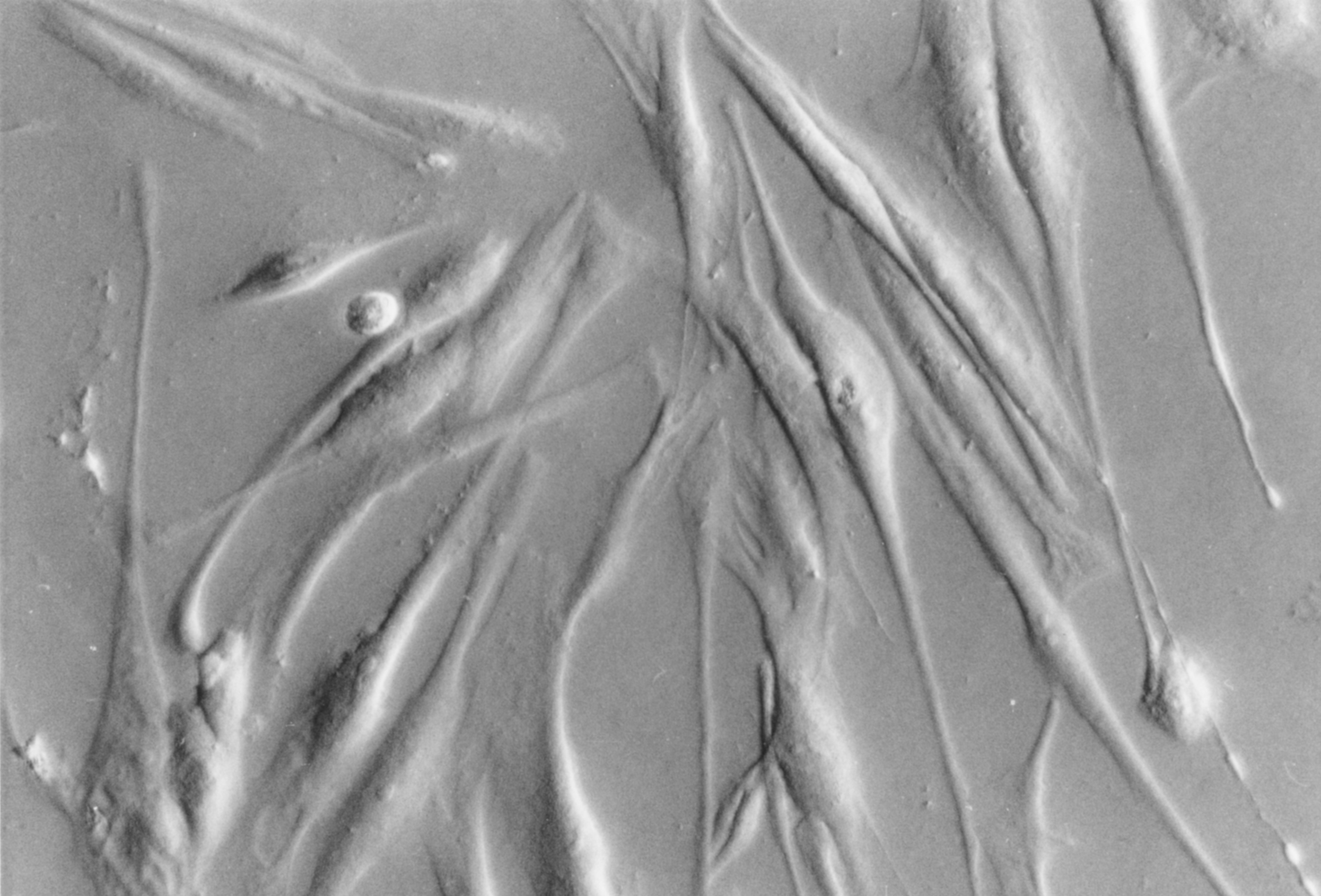
- Pancreatic stellate cells in varel contrast microscopy.

Details
- Location: Pancreas

Identifiers
- MeSH: D058954

Pancreatic stellate cells (PaSCs) are myofibroblast-like cells that are located in exocrine regions of the pancreas. These normally inactive cells get activated in situations such as tissue damage, after which they multiply, move to site of damage, and help promote tissue repair and healing. However, prolonged activation can also lead to the formation of scar tissue and fibrosis, and so they have been implicated in playing a role in diseases like chronic pancreatitis and pancreatic cancer.

PaSCs are mediated by paracrine and autocrine stimuli and share similarities with the hepatic stellate cell. Pancreatic stellate cell activation and expression of matrix molecules constitute the complex process that induces pancreatic fibrosis. Synthesis, deposition, maturation and remodeling of the fibrous connective tissue can be protective, however when persistent it impedes regular pancreatic function.

== Structure ==
PaSCs are located within the peri-acinar spaces of the pancreas and extrude long cytoplasmic processes that surround the base of the acinus. PaSCs compose 4% of the total cell mass in the gland. Stellate cells derive their name from their star shape and are located in other organs such as the kidney and lungs. The cells are located in periductal and perivascular regions of the pancreas and contain vitamin A lipid droplets in their cytoplasm. PaSCs engage in disease pathogenesis by transforming from a quiescent state into an activated state, which is also known as a “myofibroblastic” state.

PaSCs express the intermediate filament proteins desmin and glial fibrillary acidic protein. The expression of a diverse range of intermediate filament proteins enables the PaSC to harbour contractile abilities. Cellular extensions also enable the cells to sense their environment. Following inflammation or injury to the pancreas, quiescent PaSCs are activated to myofibroblast-like cells, which express α-smooth muscle actin. Several morphological changes take place including nuclear enlargement and increased growth of the endoplasmic reticulum network. The activated PaSCs then grow in number, migrate and secrete extracellular matrix components such as type I collagen, chemokines and cytokines.

== Function ==
Quiescent PaSCs produce metalloproteinases such as MMP-2, MMP-9, and MMP-13 and their inhibitors, which assist in the turnover of the extracellular matrix (ECM). As a result of regulating ECM turnover, PaSCs are involved in the maintenance of the modelling of normal tissue. MMP-2 secreted by PaSCs, however, contributes to the development of pancreatic cancer.

Fibrosis is a prominent feature of chronic pancreatitis and of the desmoplastic reaction linked with pancreatic cancer. While the pathogenesis of fibrosis remains elusive, the activation of stellate cells contribute to pancreatic fibrosis. Numerous soluble factors regulate PaSC activation, specifically IL-1, IL-6, TNF-α, TGF-B1 and activin 1. The potential sources of these activating factors include platelets, macrophages, pancreatic acinar cells and endothelial cells in inflamed pancreas. PaSCs, individually, are also capable of synthesising cytokines such as TGF-β1, activin A and IL-1. The production of these factors indicates the presence of autocrine loops that perpetuate PaSC activation, promoting the development of fibrosis.

Protein kinases such as mitogen-activated protein kinases (MAPKs) are primary mediators of activating signals initiated by the growth factors, angiotensin II and ethanol. Other signalling pathways regulating PaSC activation include PI3K, RHO kinase and TGF-β/SMAD-related pathways. Following activation, PaSCs migrate to areas of tissue damage and contract, phagocytose, and induce products that regulate the ECM through facilitating repair or by promoting fibrosis. The migration of PaSCs is modulated by Indian hedgehog (IHH), a peptide that is involved in pancreatic development, patterning and differentiation. Stellate cells express smoothened (Smo) and patched-1 (Ptch1) proteins, which are significant features of the hedgehog receptor system. Indian Hedgehog binding results in relocation of the transcriptional of transcription factor Gli-1 into the nucleus, inducing chemokinetic migration of PaSCs.

Following activation, PaSCs have two fates. If there is sustained inflammation and injury, PaSC activation is perpetuated, resulting in the growth of pancreatic fibrosis. The activation of P2 receptors induces intracellular calcium signalling which mediates the fibrogenic function of activated stellate cells. However, if inflammation and injury is minor, PaSCs undergo an apoptotic fate and become quiescent, preventing the development of fibrosis.

PaSCs also display ethanol-inducible alcohol dehydrogenase (ADH) activity. The possibility that pancreatic stellate cells may be exposed to ethanol and acetaldehyde during ethanol consumption is likely, as the pancreas metabolise ethanol to acetaldehyde through the oxidative pathway. PaSCs are activated upon exposure to ethanol and its metabolite acetaldehyde or to oxidant stress. Ethanol at clinically relevant concentrations causes α-SMA expression and collagen production in PaSCs but produce a minimal effect on cell proliferation.

Increased α-SMA expression in stellate cells exposed to ethanol suggests activation and transformation of the cells to a myofibroblast phenotype. Incubation of PaSCs with ethanol in the presence of ADH inhibitor 4MP had inhibited the increase in collagen synthesis induced by ethanol. The conversion of ethanol to acetaldehyde via ADH is a significant step in the ethanol induced activation of pancreatic stellate cells.

== Clinical significance ==
=== Pancreatitis ===
Pancreatitis is generally classified into two forms, acute and chronic. In acute pancreatitis, necroinflammation of the organ occurs, while chronic pancreatitis is distinguished by the progressive loss of endocrine and exocrine function. After pancreatic damage occurs, pathologic events such as interstitial oedema, necrosis of parenchymal cells, activation and proliferation of PaSCs take place. Inflammation and parenchymal necrosis precede PaSC activation. Activated PaSCs are located in areas of major necrosis and inflammation that harbour cytokines, growth factors and reactive oxygen species. Inflammatory processes are essential in contributing towards the activation of stellate cells. Therefore, both autocrine and paracrine mediators are involved pancreatic stellate cell activation.

Copious amounts of α- SMA-expressing cells are present in fibrotic areas of pancreatic tissue sections in patients with chronic pancreatitis. α-SMA-expressing cells in fibrotic areas yield mRNA encoding pro-collagen α1I, indicating that activated PaSCs are the predominant source of collagen in pancreatic fibrosis. Activated PaSCs and other myo-fibroblast cells contribute to the formation of a provisional matrix at the injury site, which enables cell proliferation, migration and the assembly of new parenchymal cells. In the majority of cases, activated PaSCs recede after the termination of the injurious agent, however repeated pancreatic damage can result in proliferation of PaSCs and eventual fibrosis.

In humans, persistent injury to the pancreas is linked with chronic alcohol use, pancreatic duct obstruction and genetic causes. Chronic damage leads to the sustained activation of the active PaSC phenotype. Diminished production of MMPs by PaSCs also contributes to the fibrotic phenotype. Other factors may also drive the persistent activated state of PaSCs in the event of pancreatitis. For example, PaSCs express protease-activated receptor 2 (PAR-2), which is cleaved by trypsin to become active. Active PAR-2 then instigates PaSC growth and collagen synthesis.

=== Cancer ===
Pancreatic adenocarcinomas are recognised by tumour desmoplasia, distinguished by an increase in the connective tissue that surrounds the neoplasm. Activated PaSCs in the tumour desmoplasia of human pancreatic cancers express α-SMA and co-localise with MRNA encoding pro-collagen α1I. These factors are significant contributors of the ECM proteins that compose the desmoplasia. A symbiotic relationship exists between pancreatic adenocarcinoma cells and PaSCs, which leads to an overall increase in the rate of growth of the tumour. For example, culture supernatants from human pancreatic tumour cell lines induce PaSC proliferation and the production of ECM proteins.

Pancreatic tumour cells stimulate the proliferation of PaSCs through the secretion of PDGF, and induce PaSC production of ECM proteins by secreting TGF-β1 and FGF-2. Pancreatic tumour cells and PaSCs operate in a symbiotic relationship in animal studies, however data from human pancreatic tumours is limited. Connective tissue growth factor is involved in the pathogenesis of fibrotic diseases and is predominantly found in PaSCs through regulation by TGF-β.

Pancreatic cancer cells also stimulate proliferation, ECM production and TIMP1 production in PaSCs. The production of these factors is regulated by fibroblast growth factor 2, TGF-β1, and PDGF. In addition to cytokine-mediated mechanisms, PaSCs also produce a tumour supportive micro-environment through the production of matri-cellular proteins. The up regulation of matri-cellular proteins such as galectin-1, and tenascin-C is present in the stromal tissues of pancreatic cancer and chronic pancreatitis. Matricellular proteins induce proliferation, migration and production of cytokines, ECM and angiogenic responses in PaSCs, which in turn induce cancer cell proliferation. Matri-cellular proteins may therefore directly contribute to the development of pancreatic cancer through stimulating cancer cell activity. The matricellular protein also facilitates a tumour supportive microenvironment through sustained fibrogenic stellate cell activity.

A hypoxic environment in tumours influences pancreatic cancer progression. An oxygen deficient environment concomitantly exists not only in cancer cells but also in surrounding pancreatic stellate cells. The cellular response to hypoxia is mediated by the transcription factor HIF-1, which is a heterodimer protein composed of α and β subunits. Hypoxia also stimulates nuclear expression of HIF-1α followed by the production of vascular endothelial growth factor (VEGF) in PaSCs. The induction of HIF-α indicates that PaSCs serves as oxygen sensing cells within the pancreas. PaSCs, endothelial cells and other cells involved in the development of pancreatic fibrosis therefore function in coordination with a low oxygen microenvironment.

Overall, PSCs are linked to ECM production and remodeling, intra-tumoral hypoxia, resistance/barrier to chemotherapy, proliferation, invasion, migration, reduced apoptosis, angiogenesis, immune suppression, and pain factors.

=== Ongoing research ===
Treatment of chronic pancreatitis and pancreatic cancer aims to target the major mechanisms involved in both their activation and proliferation. For example, inhibition of the receptors for PDGF, TGF-β and angiotensin II in addition to suppression of the intracellular signalling pathways downstream of these receptors is likely to be of therapeutic benefit. In vitro experiments indicate that PaSCs influence the activation and proliferation process for mitogen-activated protein kinase (MAPK) pathways, in particular ERK1/2, p38 kinase and JNK. The inhibition of the majority of MAPK pathways leads to a reduction in the activation and proliferation of PaSCs.

Anti-fibrosis treatment strategies targeting PaSCs include inhibition of the activation of quiescent PaSCs. Agents such as angiotensin receptor blockers, serine protease inhibitors and adenine dinucleotide phosphate oxidase inhibit the activation and function of PaSCs. Camostat mesilate, an oral protease inhibitor, that is used to treat patients with chronic pancreatitis inhibited the proliferation and MCP-1 production in PaSCs in vitro. The success and effect of anti-fibrosis therapies in pancreatic cancer treatment, however, remains unclear.

Rat PaSCs express COX-2 when stimulated with TGF beta 1 (TGF-β1) and other cytokines. pharmacological inhibition of COX-2 and inhibition of TGF-β1 signalling pathway decreases the expression of COX-2, α-SMA and collagen I, indicating that COX-2 may be a therapeutic target for pancreatic cancer and chronic pancreatitis. Strategies aimed at inducing PaSC transformation from an activated to a quiescent state and inducing PaSC apoptosis may also be used to treat pancreatic cancer and chronic pancreatitis. For example, the administration of vitamin A induces culture activated rat PaSCs to trans-differentiate to a quiescent state, preventing the progression of pancreatic cancer and pancreatitis.

== History ==
While the discovery of hepatic stellate cells is attributed to Karl Wilhelm von Kupffer in 1876, who had termed them “stellate cells”, the original discovery is attributed to more than one research group. The first documented observations of PaSCs were recorded by Watari et al. in 1982. Watari observed the pancreas of vitamin A primed mice using fluorescence microscopy and electron microscopy. Cells displaying fading blue-green fluorescence typical of vitamin A in the periacinar region of pancreas was observed. Watari likened these cells to hepatic stellate cells. The publication of two seminal research papers in 1998 outlining the isolation of these cells provided an in vitro method by which researchers may characterise PaSCs in both health and pathology.

== See also ==
- Hepatic stellate cell
- Stellate cell
- List of distinct cell types in the adult human body
