= Myofibroblast =

Cell type with functions of both muscular and fibrous connective tissue

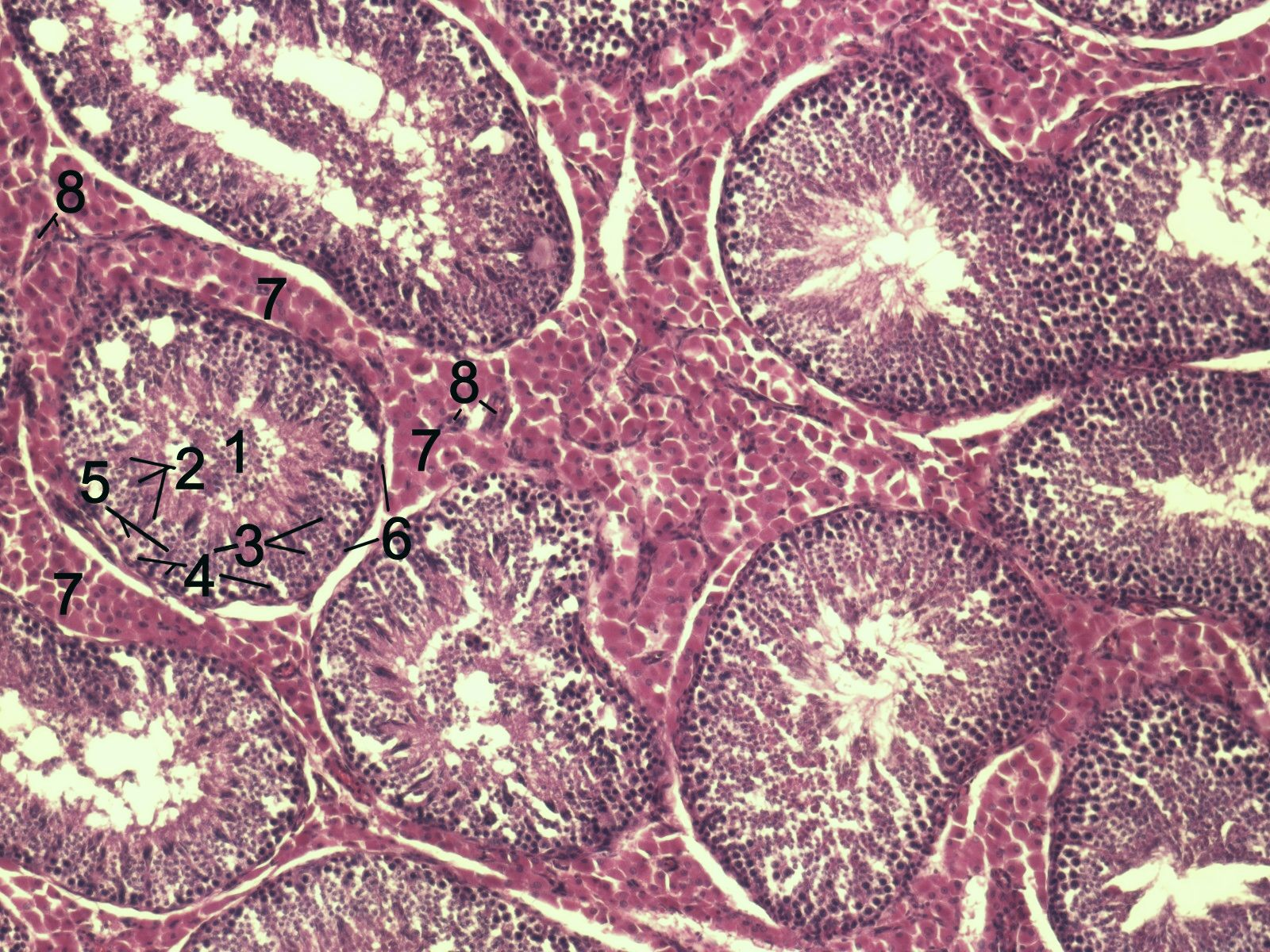
- Histological section through testicular parenchyma of a boar. 1 Lumen of tubulus seminiferus contortus, 2 spermatids, 3 spermatocytes, 4 spermatogonia, 5 Sertoli cell, 6 Myofibroblasts, 7 Leydig cells, 8 capillaries

Details

Identifiers
- Latin: myofibroblastus
- MeSH: D058628
- TH: H2.00.03.0.01013

A myofibroblast is a cell phenotype that was first described as being in a state between a fibroblast and a smooth muscle cell.

== Structure ==
Myofibroblasts are contractile web-like fusiform cells that are identifiable by their expression of α-smooth muscle actin within their cytoplasmic stress fibers.

In the gastrointestinal and genitourinary tracts, myofibroblasts are found subepithelially in mucosal surfaces. Here they not only act as a regulator of the shape of the crypts and villi, but also act as stem-niche cells in the intestinal crypts and as parts of atypical antigen-presenting cells. They have both support as well as paracrine function in most places.

== Location ==
Myofibroblasts were first identified in granulation tissue during skin wound healing. Typically, these cells are found in granulation tissue, scar tissue (fibrosis) and the stroma of tumours. They also line the gastrointestinal tract, wherein they regulate the shapes of crypts and villi.

=== Markers ===
Myofibroblasts usually stain for the intermediate filament vimentin, which is a general mesenchymal marker, α-smooth muscle actin (human gene = ACTA2), and for palladin, which is a cytoskeletal actin scaffold protein. They are positive for other smooth muscle markers, such as intermediate filament type desmin in some tissues, but may be negative for desmin in other tissues. Similar heterogeneous positivity may exist for almost every smooth muscle marker except probably a few which are positive only in contractile smooth muscles like metavinculin and smoothelin.

Myofibroblasts upregulate the expression of fibronectin, collagens, and hyaluronic acid during and after their differentiation from fibroblasts. Among these, the EDA isoform of fibronectin (EDA-FN), and collagen type I (COL1A1/COL1A2) are typical markers of myofibroblast-dependent synthesis of pro-fibrotic extracellular matrix.

Some myofibroblasts (especially if they have a stellate form) may also be positive for GFAP.

== Development ==
There are many possible ways of myofibroblast development:

1. Partial smooth muscle differentiation of a fibroblastic cell
2. Activation of a stellate cell (e.g. hepatic Ito cells or pancreatic stellate cells).
3. Loss of contractile phenotype (or acquisition of "synthetic phenotype") of a smooth muscle cell.
4. Direct myofibroblastic differentiation of a progenitor cell resident in a stromal tissue.
5. Homing and recruitment of a circulating mesenchymal precursor which can directly differentiate as above or indirectly differentiate through the other cell types as intermediates.
6. Epithelial to mesenchymal transdifferentiation (EMT) of an epithelial cell.

Perhaps the most studied pathway of myofibroblast formation is TGF-beta1 dependent differentiation from fibroblast cells. Activation of the TGF-beta receptor 1 and TGF-beta receptor 2 leads to induction of the canonical SMAD2/SMAD3 pathway. Together with the co-activation of the non-canonical EGFR pathway, these events lead to upregulation of the ACTA2 gene and subsequent alpha smooth muscle actin protein production. Several regulators of the myofibroblast differentiation pathway have been described, including hyaluronan and CD44 co-receptor activation of EGFR.

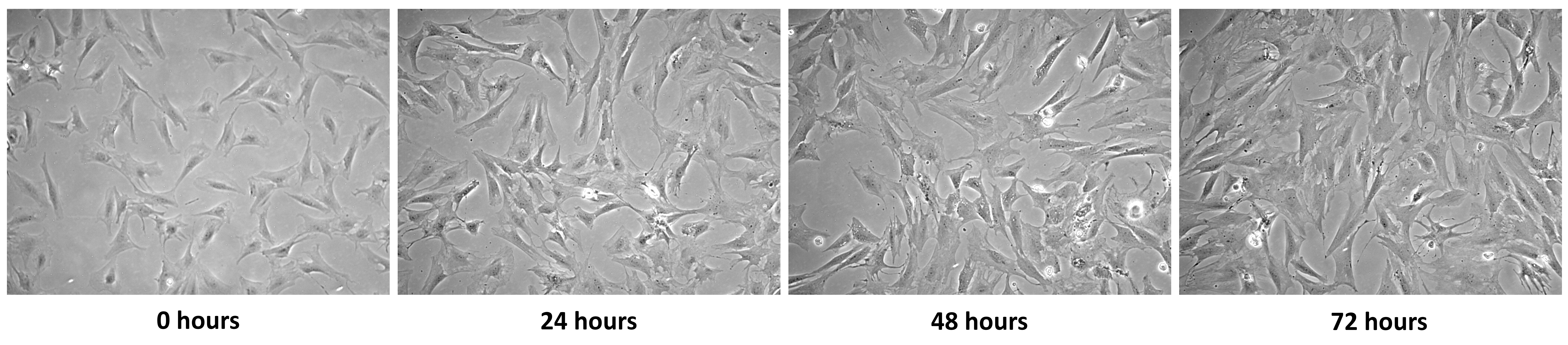
Primary culture of cardiac fibroblasts stimulated with TGF-beta to differentiate them to myofibroblasts. Images taken at different post-stimulus times.

== Function ==
In many organs like liver, lung, and kidneys, they are primarily involved in fibrosis. In the wound tissue they are implicated in wound strengthening by extracellular collagen fiber deposition and then wound contraction by intracellular contraction and concomitant alignment of the collagen fibers by integrin-mediated pulling on to the collagen bundles. Pericytes and renal mesangial cells are some examples of modified myofibroblast-like cells.

Myofibroblasts may interfere with the propagation of electrical signals controlling heart rhythm, leading to arrhythmia in both patients who have suffered a heart attack and in foetuses. Ursodiol is a promising drug for this condition.

=== Wound healing ===
Myofibroblasts can contract by using smooth muscle type actin-myosin complex, rich in a form of actin called alpha-smooth muscle actin. These cells are then capable of speeding wound repair by contracting the edges of the wound.

Early work on wound healing showed that granulation tissue taken from a wound could contract in vitro (or in an organ bath) in a similar fashion to smooth muscle, when exposed to substances that cause smooth muscle to contract, such as adrenaline or angiotensin.

More recently it has been shown that fibroblasts can transform into myofibroblasts with photobiomodulation.

After healing is complete, these cells are lost through apoptosis and it has been suggested that in several fibrotic diseases (for example liver cirrhosis, kidney fibrosis, retroperitoneal fibrosis) that this mechanism fails to work, leading to persistence of the myofibroblasts, and consequently expansion of the extracellular matrix (fibrosis) with contraction.

Similarly, in wounds that fail to resolve and become keloids or hypertrophic scars, myofibroblasts may persist, rather than disappearing by apoptosis.

== See also ==
- List of human cell types derived from the germ layers
