= Friedrich Zollinger =

German architect, engineer and town planner

Friedrich Reinhard Balthasar Zollinger, also known as Fritz Zollinger (31 March 1880 – 19 April 1945), was a German architect, engineer, building official and town planner.

He served as city architect in Merseburg, and developed the "Zollinger roof" (a timber lamella roofing system of a gridshell type), and the no-fines concreting process.

Fritz Zollinger was not related to the Swiss architect Otto Zollinger (1886–1970) who worked in Saarbrücken from 1924 to 1944.

== Life ==
Born and raised in Wiesbaden, Zollinger completed his Abitur in 1898 to graduate from secondary school (Städtischen Oberrealschule). He went on to study architecture and urban planning at the Technical University of Darmstadt (Technische Hochschule Darmstadt). He completed his studies in 1907 with a thesis in the field of urban planning. Following his military service (1907–1908) he went into government service. From 1908 to 1910 he worked for the Building Department in Dieburg, following which he worked for the Ministry of Finance of the Grand Duchy of Hesse in Darmstadt and for the Railway Directorate in Frankfurt am Main. From October 1911 to December 1912 he was city architect in Aschaffenburg, in charge of the building construction department. From the beginning of 1913, Zollinger served as city construction inspector in Neukölln near Berlin. At the beginning of the First World War he served in the military for three months before taking the place of the recently deceased city architect of Neukölln.

In 1918 he was appointed city architect in Merseburg. Following the First World War there was a severe housing shortage in the industrial region around Merseburg. As city architect, Zollinger created a general development plan for the city in 1922. At the same time he founded the Merseburg construction company, where he was able to apply his creativity to provide low-cost accommodation. The construction process used streamlined design, poured concrete construction, the Zollinger lamella roof, and also involved the future residents in a number of activities. By following this approach much affordable housing could be constructed in a short time. Between 1922 and 1929 the Merseburg construction company built 1250 housing units. In 1930 Zollinger decided not to extend his contract with the city of Merseburg. In the following years he was self-employed and undertook several educational trips, including to Britain and France.

In 1932 Zollinger finally left Merseburg and until 1934 he taught at the Technical University of Darmstadt, after which he moved to Munich. He died in 1945 in Aising-Kaltmühl in Southern Bavaria near the border with Austria.

== The Zollinger System ==
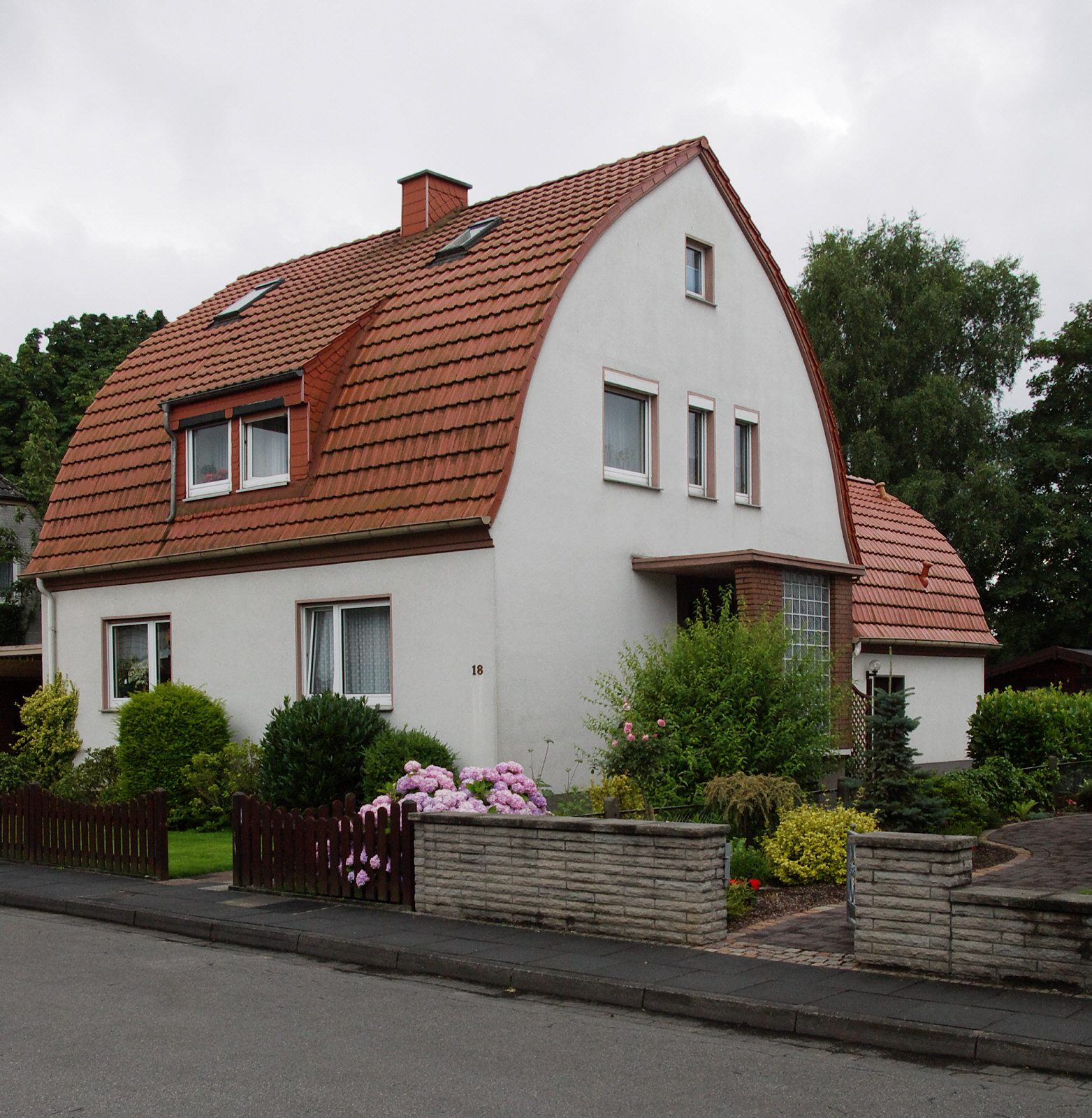
House with Zollinger roof in Schweicheln-Bermbeck, Germany

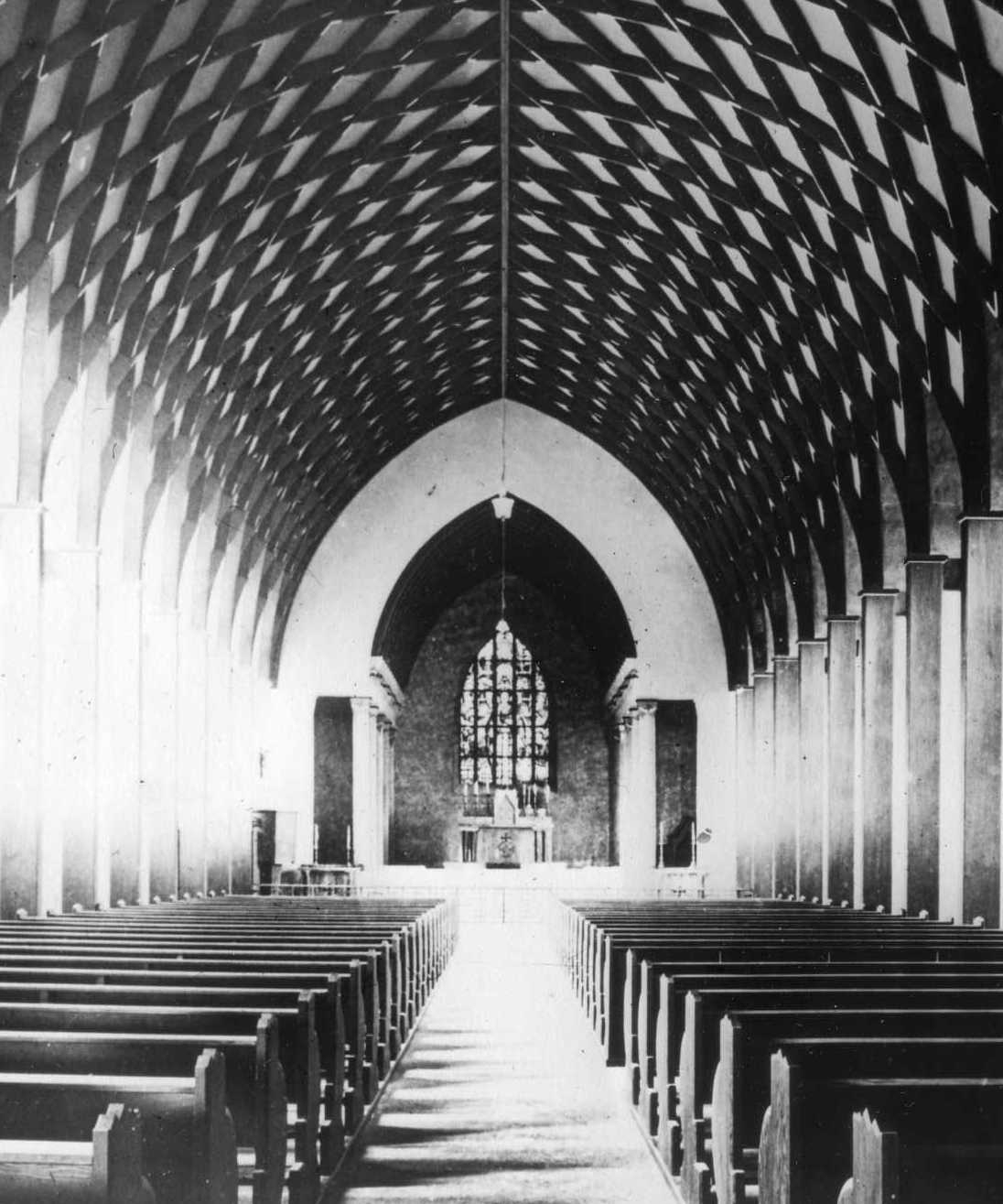
Interior view of the Augustinus church in Heilbronn

The Zollinger system is a lamella gridshell construction system for timber roofs in which a large number of short planks is put together in a diamond grid. The system has been developed in Germany in the early 20th century by Friedrich Zollinger and has been mostly used to construct curved roofs.

=== Properties ===
Compared to traditional saddle roofs (with flat roof surfaces), roofs that are constructed with the Zollinger system have various advantages:

- The arched outer shape of the roof and the absence of beams and supports results in a larger and more usable space under the roof.
- The amount of wood required for the roof construction is 40 percent lower than what would be used using traditional construction types.
- The need for long straight planks is reduced due to the segmental arrangement of short pieces of wood.
- Openings for windows or dormers can easily be cut out from the roof structure.
- Due to the standardized dimensions of the lamellas, they could be prefabricated in large quantities in the sawmill, independent of any specific project.
- The installation of the roof is relatively simple and thus building owners or future tenants could help to erect it and thus save costs.
- Due to the small size of the planks, a roof could be built without the use of a crane.

A downside of the construction is that it takes relatively much labour to put together. Additionally, the bolted connections need to be checked regularly and retightened if necessary. Furthermore, as the planks are typically only a couple of cm thick, they cannot withstand fire for long.

Apart from residential construction, the construction system has also been used for the construction of public buildings, barns, hangars and railway halls, stadiums, market halls and churches.

Most Zollinger roofs were designed as a pointed saddleback roof, but examples of hipped roofs exist as well, for example the Protestant church in Lauta or the Römerhof in Freiburg im Breisgau. Barrel roofs using the Zollinger system have been used for the construction of industrial buildings.

=== Development ===
The housing shortage in Germany in the 1920s led to the need to build housing as quickly and cheaply as possible. Existing building techniques were improved, procedures rationalised and new ideas developed. In Merseburg, City Planning Councillor Friedrich Zollinger was involved with developing industrial mass production methods for standardised building systems. Using barrel vaults that are constructed by connecting parallel rafters with staggered boards as a reference, Zollinger developed the principle of a diamond lamella roof without planks and rafters. On 14 October 1921, he applied for a patent for his roof construction made of short planks, which was granted on 28 December 1923. The patent describes space-enclosing, flat or curved constructions. From 1921 until 1926, the construction system was marketed and distributed by the Deutsche Zollbau-Licenz-Gesellschaft m.b.H., which afterwards was replaced by the Europäische Zollbau-Syndikat A.G.. In 1926, the European Customs Construction Syndicate AG advertised on a leaflet with 850,000 square metres already built.

The flat variant mentioned in the patent specification differed from the curved variant only in the use of flat instead of curved slats. For the arched roofs, both the top and the bottom edge of boards were initially cut in a curve shape, with the amount of curvature determining the curvature of the roof. After a short time, only the side of the board that faces upward was curved; the lower side remained straight.

=== Construction ===
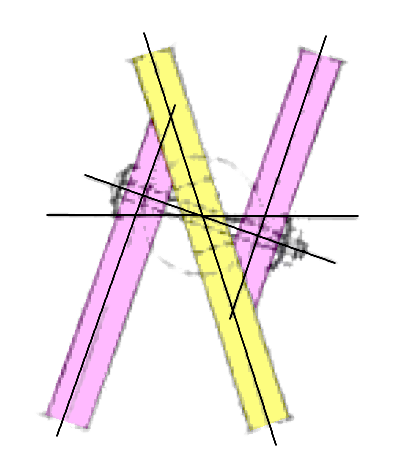
Typical connection between planks in a Zollinger roof

In the Zollinger construction system, short planks are arranged in such a way that two planks meet in the middle of a vertically running plank. A typical connection details consists of a bolt that goes through a slotted hole in the middle plank, with toothed washers being placed between the planks. Typical dimensions for the planks used in roofs constructed in the interwar period are 3 cm × 20 cm, with lengths between 2 and 2.5 m.

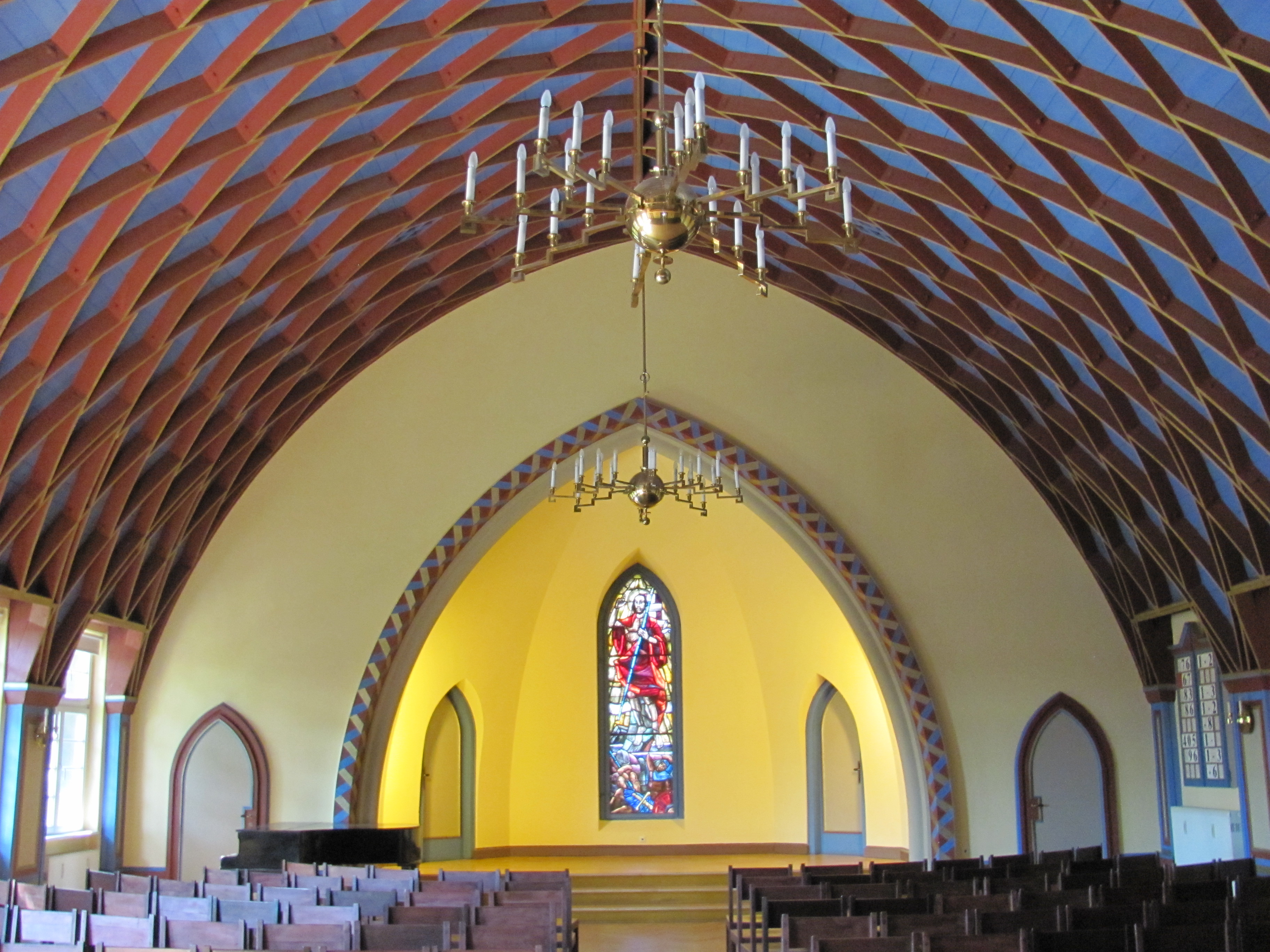
Luthersaal in the Lutherhaus in Kötzschenbroda: West side

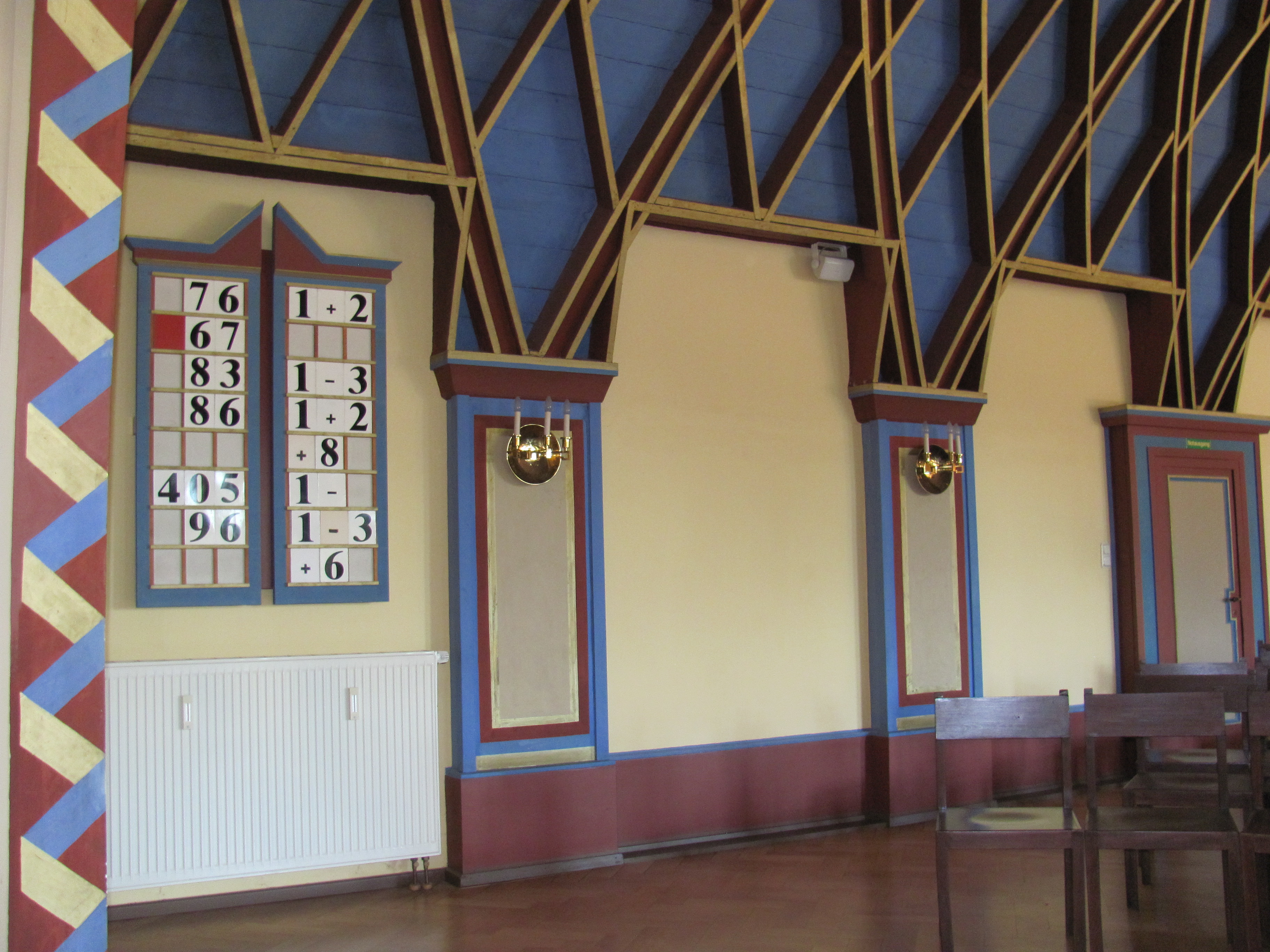
Lutherhaus in Kötzschenbroda: connection between roof and wall

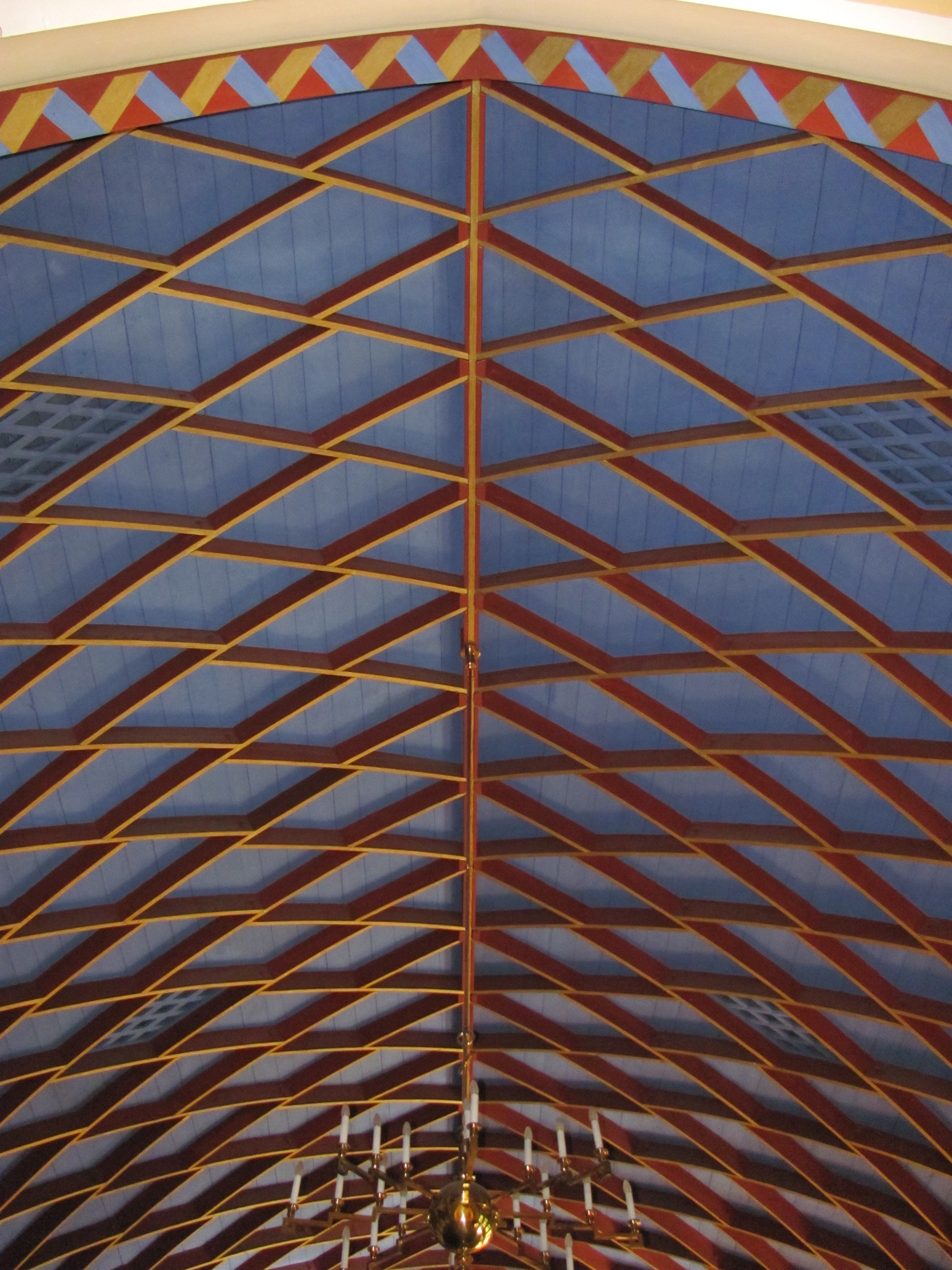
Lutherhaus in Kötzschenbroda: roof construction

=== Structural calculations ===
At the time of the patent application, the statics of the Zollbau lamella roof could not be calculated exactly. The Berlin-Lichterfelde State Materials Testing Office therefore carried out practical load tests on various Zollinger roofs in the summer of 1922 and spring of 1923, as did the materials testing offices of the Technical Universities in Dresden and Hanover. Even if from today's point of view the approximate calculations carried out at that time prove to be insufficient, the large number of preserved roofs shows that the Zollinger construction had sufficient load-bearing capacity.

=== Recent examples ===
In recent years, the Zollinger system has been used in a number of projects, including the Hansemesse Rostock, Germany (albeit with a different connection detail), the bird observatory in Haringvliet, Netherlands and an exhibition space in Nuuksio, Finland.

== Selected buildings ==
- 1924: little villa in Merseburg (home of Friedrich Zollinger for many years)
- 1927/1929: Labour, Welfare and Health Office in Merseburg; now the "Zollinger House" with 14 flats
- 1927–28: Albrecht Dürer School Merseburg with a gymnasium and an auditorium including stage under the school roof
- 1929: Merseburg Upper Secondary School in Lessingstraße (so called "Glass box" or "Glas house")

== Publications ==
- City of Merseburg (Pub.), Friedrich Zollinger (Ed.): Merseburg. (= Deutschlands Städtebau.) DARI-Verlag, Berlin-Halensee, 1922.
