= Hepatocyte =

Liver cell type

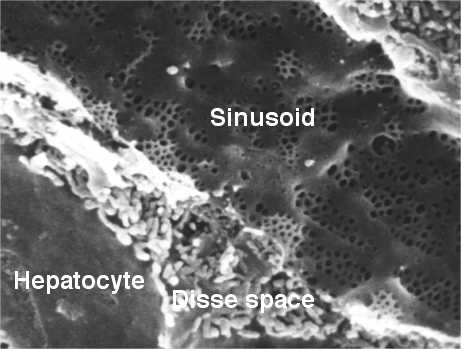
- Hepatocyte and sinusoid (venule) in a section of rat liver, scanning electron micrograph

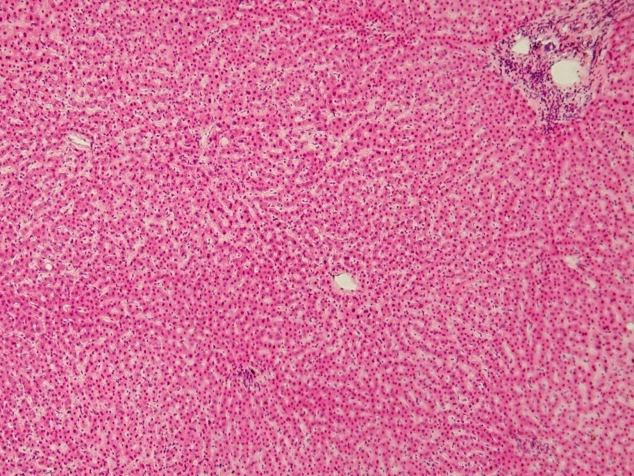
- Human liver stained with hematoxylin and eosin showing hepatocytes organized into plates and lobules

Details
- Location: Liver

Identifiers
- MeSH: D022781
- TH: H3.04.05.0.00006
- FMA: 14515

A hepatocyte is a cell of the main parenchymal tissue of the liver. Hepatocytes make up 80% of the liver's mass.

These cells are involved in:

- Protein synthesis
- Protein storage
- Transformation of carbohydrates
- Synthesis of cholesterol, bile salts and phospholipids
- Detoxification, modification, and excretion of exogenous and endogenous substances
- Initiation of formation and secretion of bile

== Structure ==
The typical hepatocyte is cubical with sides of 20–30 μm, (in comparison, a human hair has a diameter of 17 to 180 μm). The typical volume of a hepatocyte is 3.4 × 10^{−9} cm^{3}.

=== Microanatomy ===
Hepatocytes display an eosinophilic cytoplasm, reflecting numerous mitochondria, and basophilic stippling due to large amounts of rough endoplasmic reticulum and free ribosomes. Brown lipofuscin granules are also observed (with increasing age) together with irregular unstained areas of cytoplasm; these correspond to cytoplasmic glycogen and lipid stores removed during histological preparation.

Hepatocyte nuclei are round with dispersed chromatin and prominent nucleoli. Anisokaryosis (or variation in the size of the nuclei) is common and often reflects tetraploidy and other degrees of polyploidy, a normal feature of 30–40% of hepatocytes in the adult human liver. Binucleate cells are also common.

Hepatocytes are organised into plates separated by vascular channels (sinusoids), an arrangement supported by a reticulin (collagen type III) network. The hepatocyte plates are one cell thick in mammals and two cells thick in the chicken. Sinusoids display a discontinuous, fenestrated endothelial cell lining. The endothelial cells have no basement membrane and are separated from the hepatocytes by the space of Disse, which drains lymph into the portal tract lymphatics.

Kupffer cells are scattered between endothelial cells; they are part of the reticuloendothelial system and phagocytose spent erythrocytes. Stellate (Ito) cells store vitamin A and produce extracellular matrix and collagen; they are also distributed amongst endothelial cells but are difficult to visualise by light microscopy.

== Function ==
=== Protein synthesis ===
The hepatocyte is a cell in the body that manufactures serum albumin, fibrinogen, and the prothrombin group of clotting factors (except for Factors 3 and 4).

It is the main site for the synthesis of lipoproteins, ceruloplasmin, transferrin, complement, and glycoproteins. Hepatocytes manufacture their own structural proteins and intracellular enzymes.

Synthesis of proteins is by the rough endoplasmic reticulum (RER), and both the rough and smooth endoplasmic reticulum (SER) are involved in secretion of the proteins formed.

The endoplasmic reticulum (ER) is involved in conjugation of proteins to lipid and carbohydrate moieties synthesized by, or modified within, the hepatocytes.

Proteins produced by hepatocytes that function as hormones are known as hepatokines.

=== Carbohydrate metabolism ===
The liver forms fatty acids from carbohydrates and synthesizes triglycerides from fatty acids and glycerol. Hepatocytes also synthesize the apoproteins with which they then assemble and export lipoproteins (VLDL, HDL).

The liver is also the main site in the body for gluconeogenesis, the formation of carbohydrates from precursors such as alanine, glycerol, and oxaloacetate.

=== Lipid metabolism ===
The liver receives many lipids from the systemic circulation and metabolizes chylomicron remnants. It also synthesizes cholesterol from acetate and further synthesizes bile salts. The liver is the sole site of bile salts formation.

=== Detoxification ===
Hepatocytes contain abundant endoplasmic reticulum.

Hepatocytes have the ability to metabolize, detoxify, and inactivate exogenous compounds such as drugs (see drug metabolism), insecticides, and endogenous compounds such as steroids.

The drainage of the intestinal venous blood into the liver requires efficient detoxification of miscellaneous absorbed substances to maintain homeostasis and protect the body against ingested toxins.

One of the detoxifying functions of hepatocytes is to modify ammonia into urea for excretion. Hepatic encephalopathy occurs when the liver fails to perform this function, causing the built-up ammonia to interfere with the functions of the brain.

=== Renewal, regeneration and aging ===
Hepatocytes are able to self-renew. Homeostatic self-renewal is mostly carried out by diploid cells (71%/year), but binucleated double-diploid cells (10%/year) and tetraploid cells (1%/year) also contribute. The diploid and binucleated cells have higher annual birth rates in younger people, settling into a stable value around adulthood. Even in an 80-year-old person, the average age of the diploid cell population does not exceed one year and the other cell types 5 years. There is limited switching between these three cell types.

The human and rodent livers are also famously able to regenerate after damage and/or partial excision: it expands to around its original size without retaining the original shape. As in self-renewal, regeneration is mostly carried out by the diploid hepatocyte population, with the addition of some small contribution from cholangiocytes converting to hepatocytes. When damage happens, a migratory population of ANXA2^{+} hepatocytes leads the charge in the necrotic region to close the wound as the sheets of regular hepatocytes move and expand behind them. Wound closure predates most of the proliferation activity.

As mammalian liver cells age, damages in their DNA increase in prevalence. A review of the literature indicated that in mouse liver cells DNA damages (single-strand breaks, oxidized bases and 7-methylguanine) increase with age. Also, in rat liver, DNA single- and double-strand breaks, oxidized bases, and methylated bases increase with age; and in rabbit liver, cross-linked bases increase with age. Liver cells depend on DNA repair pathways that specifically protect the transcribed compartment of the genome to promote sustained functionality and cell preservation with age.

== Society and culture ==
=== Use in research ===
Primary hepatocytes are commonly used in cell biological and biopharmaceutical research as they closely reflect the metabolic, transporter, and detoxification functions of the human liver. They have greatly contributed to understanding the physiological and pathological functions of the liver. However, they present some limitations: limited availability, short lifespan in culture, and significant donor-to-donor variability.

To address these constraints, several human hepatic models have been developed. First, liver cancer cell lines such as HepG2 and HuH-7 were widely used due to their ease of culture and proliferation, but their metabolic and functional profiles remained limited compared to primary human hepatocytes (PHH). The development of HepaRG cells marked a significant advancement, as they display characteristics remarkably similar to PHH, including drug-metabolizing enzyme activity. More recently, progress in stem cell biology has enabled the differentiation of induced pluripotent stem cells (iPSCs) into hepatocyte-like cells, expanding the repertoire of human liver models. In parallel, techniques to repopulate the liver of immunodeficient mice with PHH have created humanized livers, allowing for the continuous procurement of fresh human hepatocytes for research purposes. HepaSH cells build on these advances, combining the functionality of PHH with the scalability and reproducibility required for advanced in vitro studies.

While each model provides unique strengths and specific limitations, primary human hepatocytes continue to serve as the gold standard against which all other hepatic systems are benchmarked.

Primary hepatocytes are usually isolated from animal or human whole liver or liver tissue by collagenase digestion, which is a two-step process. In the first step, the liver is placed in an isotonic solution, in which calcium is removed to disrupt cell-cell tight junctions by the use of a calcium chelating agent. Next, a solution containing collagenase is added to separate the hepatocytes from the liver stroma. This process creates a suspension of hepatocytes, which can be seeded in multi-well plates and cultured for many days or even weeks. For optimal results, culture plates should first be coated with an extracellular matrix (e.g. collagen, Matrigel) to promote hepatocyte attachment (typically within 1–3 hours after seeding) and maintenance of the hepatic phenotype. In addition, an overlay with an additional layer of extracellular matrix is often performed to establish a sandwich culture of hepatocytes. The application of a sandwich configuration supports prolonged maintenance of hepatocytes in culture. Freshly isolated hepatocytes that are not used immediately can be cryopreserved and stored. They do not proliferate in culture and are intensely sensitive to damage during cryopreservation, including freezing and thawing. Even after the addition of classical cryoprotectants there can still be cellular damage. Nevertheless, recent cryopreservation and resuscitation protocols support the application of cryopreserved hepatocytes for most biopharmaceutical applications.

== Additional images ==
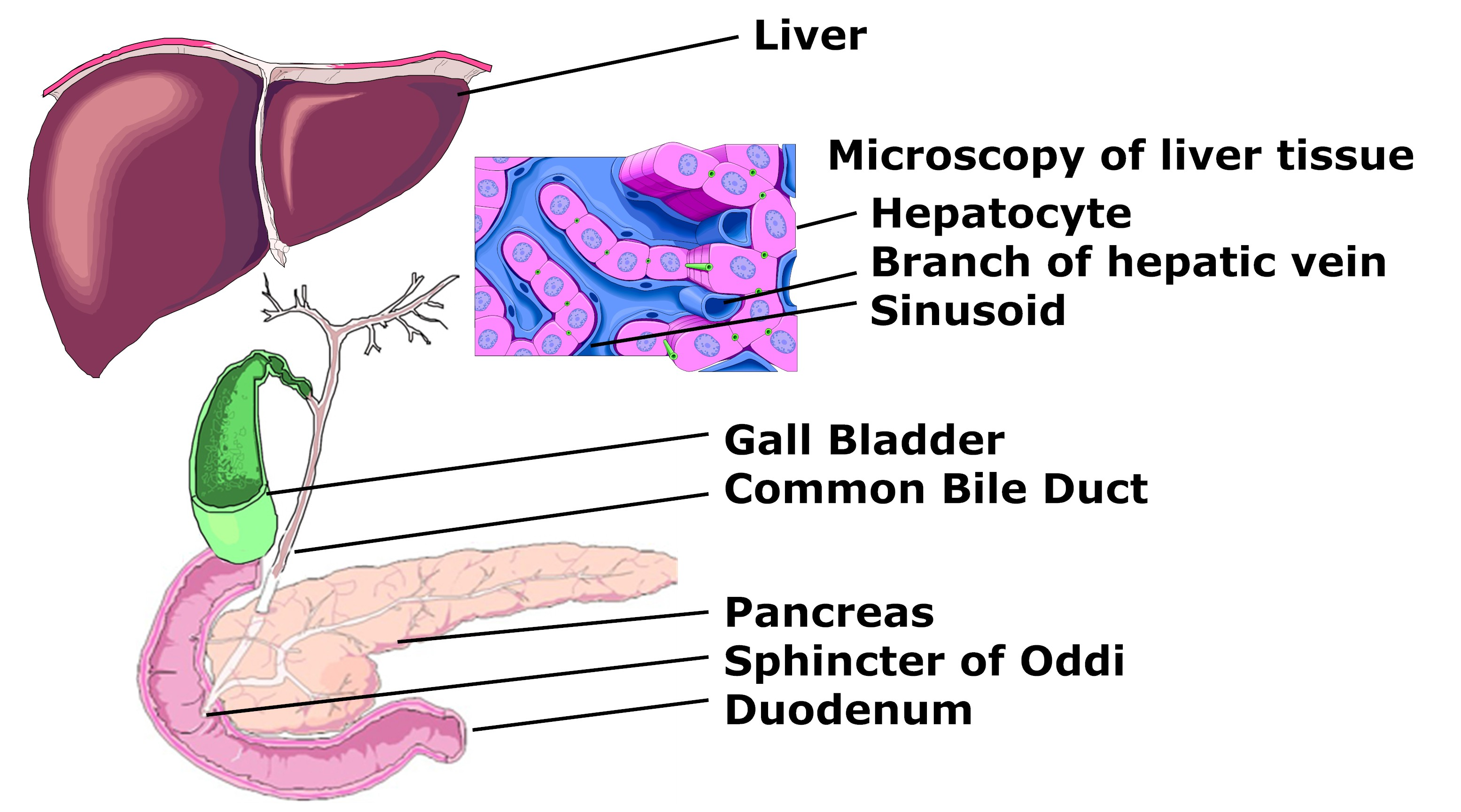
Schematic diagram of biliary system

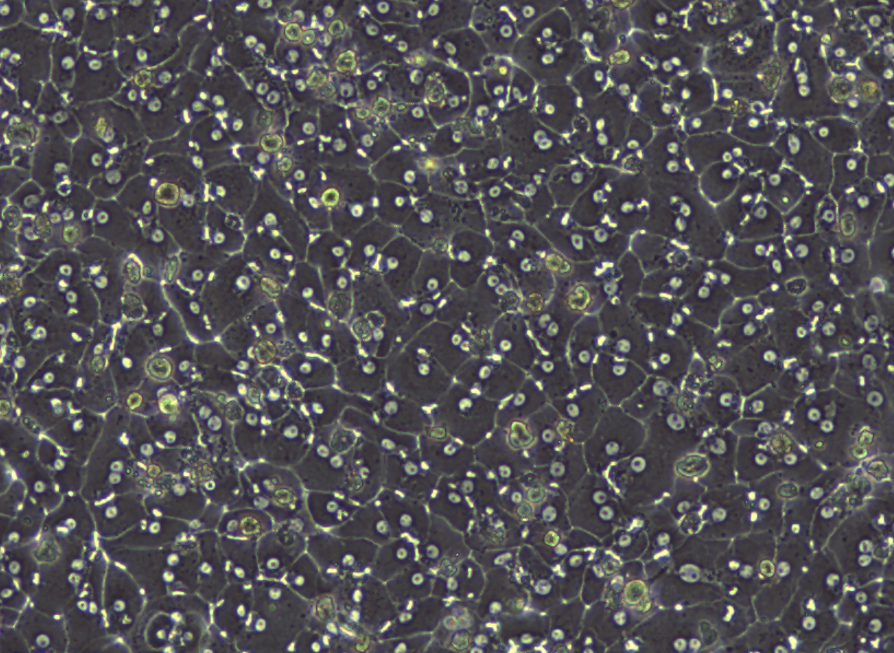
Hepatocytes in cell culture

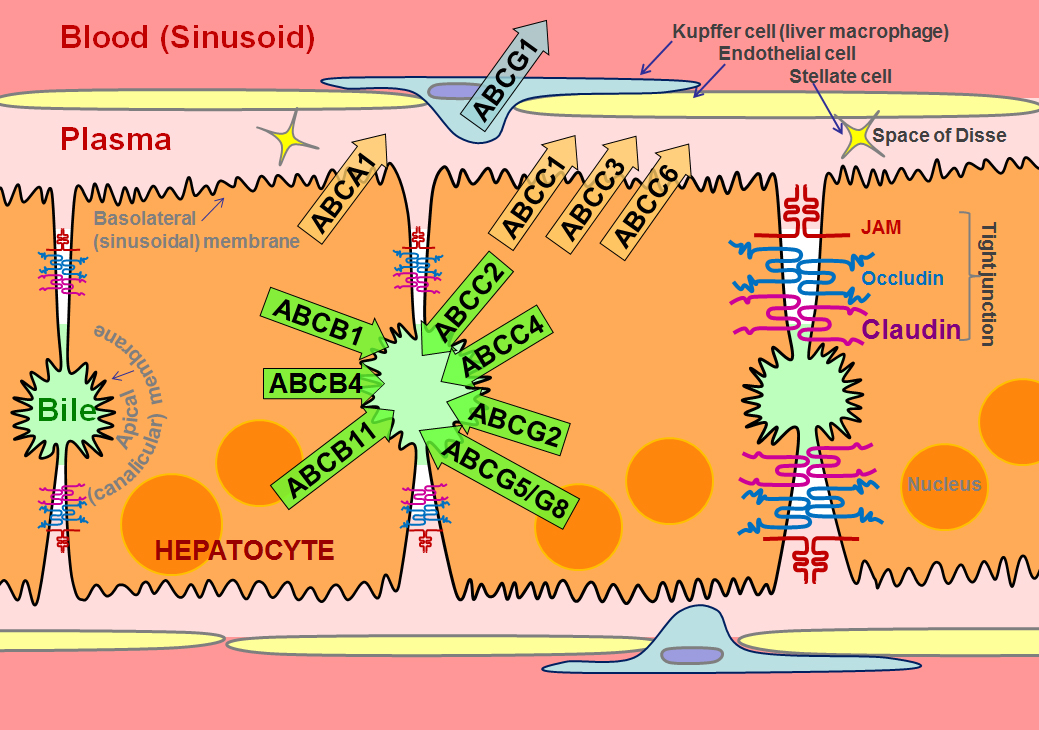
Schematic of hepatocyte polarization, showing proteins localized to the basolateral and apical surfaces of the hepatocyte, referred to as the sinusoidal and canalicular membranes, respectively

== See also ==
- List of human cell types derived from the germ layers
