= Perisinusoidal space =

Location in liver between hepatocyte and sinusoid

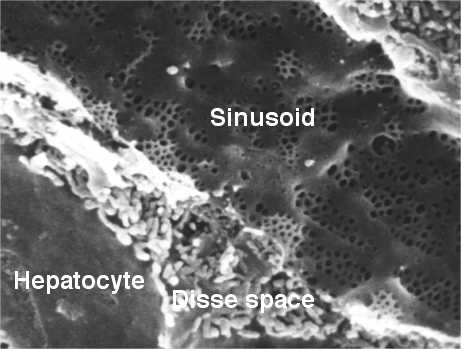
- Sinusoid of a rat liver with fenestrated endothelial cells. Fenestrae are approx 100 nm diameter, and the sinusoidal width 5 µm. Scanning electron micrograph by Robin Fraser, University of Otago.

- Basic liver structure

Details
- Location: Liver

Identifiers
- Latin: spatium perisinusoideum
- TH: H3.04.05.0.00012

The perisinusoidal space (or space of Disse) is a space between a hepatocyte, and a sinusoid in the liver. It contains the blood plasma. Microvilli of hepatocytes extend into this space, allowing proteins and other plasma components from the sinusoids to be absorbed by the hepatocytes. Fenestration and discontinuity of the sinusoid endothelium facilitates this transport. The perisinusoidal space also contains hepatic stellate cells (also known as Ito cells or lipocytes), which store vitamin A in characteristic lipid droplets.

This space may be obliterated in liver disease, leading to decreased uptake by hepatocytes of nutrients and wastes such as bilirubin.

The Space of Disse is named for the German anatomist Joseph Disse (1852–1912).

== Pathophysiology ==
=== Fibrosis ===
Liver injury from a number of causes can activate the hepatic stellate cells into transdifferentiated and prolific myofibroblasts. The myofibroblasts synthesize and secrete components of the extracellular matrix including collagen into the perisinusoidal space. This in turn promotes the development of fibrosis, and continuing fibrosis is thought to be responsible for the development of cirrhosis, and liver cancer.
