= Hepatic stellate cell =

Type of liver cell

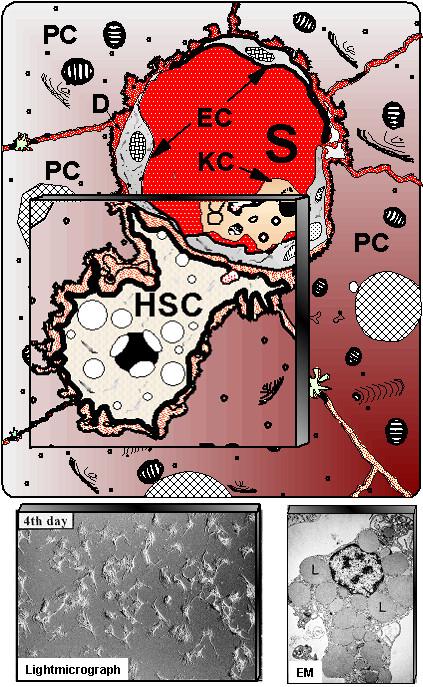
- Schematic presentation of hepatic stellate cells (HSC) located in the vicinity of adjacent hepatocytes (PC) beneath the sinusoidal endothelial cells (EC). S – liver sinusoids; KC – Kupffer cells. Down left shows cultured HSC at light-microscopy, whereas at down right electron microscopy (EM) illustrates numerous fat vacuoles (L) in a HSC, in which retinoids are stored.

- Basic liver structure

Details
- Location: Perisinusoidal space of liver

Identifiers
- Latin: cellula perisinusoidalis; cellula accumulans adipem
- MeSH: D055166
- TH: H3.04.05.0.00013

Hepatic stellate cells (HSC), also known as perisinusoidal cells or Ito cells (earlier lipocytes or fat-storing cells), are pericytes found in the perisinusoidal space of the liver, also known as the space of Disse (a small area between the sinusoids and hepatocytes). The stellate cell is the major cell type involved in liver fibrosis, which is the formation of scar tissue in response to liver damage; in addition these cells store and concentrate vitamin A.

== Structure ==
Hepatic stellate cells can be selectively stained with gold chloride, but their distinguishing feature in routine histological preparations is the presence of multiple lipid droplets in their cytoplasm. Cytoglobin expression has been shown to be a specific marker with which hepatic stellate cells can be distinguished from portal myofibroblasts in the damaged human liver. In murine (rats, mice) liver, reelin expressed by Ito cells has been shown to be a reliable marker in discerning them from other myofibroblasts. The expression of reelin is increased after liver injury.

== Function ==
In normal liver, stellate cells are described as being in a quiescent state. Quiescent stellate cells represent 5-8% of the total number of liver cells. Each cell has several long cytoplasmic protrusions that extend from the cell body and wrap around the sinusoids. The lipid droplets in the cell body store vitamin A as retinyl palmitate. Hepatic stellate cells store 50–80% of the body's vitamin A.

Besides storing Vitamin A, quiescent hepatic stellate cells maintain liver homeostasis by controlling liver zonation and function through the secretion of R-spondin 3, a key regulator of the WNT pathway. Recent evidence suggests a role as a liver-resident antigen-presenting cell, presenting lipid antigens to and stimulating proliferation of NKT cells.

When the liver is damaged, stellate cells can change into an activated state. The activated stellate cell is characterized by proliferation, contractility, and chemotaxis. This change is seen as a transdifferentiation whereby the cells lose their stellate shape and acquire that of myofibroblasts. This state of the stellate cell is the main source of extracellular matrix production in liver injury. This attribute makes it a key factor in the pathophysiology of the liver. The amount of stored vitamin A decreases progressively in liver injury. The activated stellate cell as a myofibroblast is also responsible for secreting components of the extracellular matrix including collagen that can promote the development of fibrosis and the formation of scar tissue. Continued fibrosis is thought to be responsible for the development of cirrhosis and liver cancer.

Studies have also shown that in vivo activation of hepatic stellate cells by agents causing liver fibrosis can eventually lead to senescence in these cells, marked by increased SA-beta-galactosidase staining, as well as p53 accumulation and activation of Rb—hallmarks of cellular senescence. Senescent hepatic stellate cells have been demonstrated to limit liver fibrosis by activating interactions with NK cells. Senescence of hepatic stellate cells could prevent progression of liver fibrosis, although this has not been implemented as a therapy, and would carry the risk of hepatic dysfunction.

== History ==
The term Ito cell is a reference to Toshio Ito, a twentieth-century Japanese physician, who introduced a fat-staining method to identify the "fat-storing cells" of the liver. Early on, there were many synonymous terms in common use. In 1996, a group of 98 researchers signed a letter promoting the use of the term hepatic stellate cell in order to standardize the nomenclature. Stellate refers to their star-like shape, while hepatic refers to their location in the liver, which is important to distinguish them from the cells called “stellate cells” in other parts of the body.

== See also ==
- Pancreatic stellate cell
- Stellate cell
- List of human cell types derived from the germ layers
- List of distinct cell types in the adult human body
