= Annulate lamella =

Type of double-walled membrane

Annulate lamella is one of the cell membrane classes, occurring as a set of parallel elements with double-walled membranes in the same plane/dimension, just as the nuclear envelope. These lamella have pore complexes which are identical to those of the nuclear envelope. It is arranged in a highly ordered structure with regular spacing between themselves.

These lamella are characteristics of the oocytes, spermatocytes, some somatic and cancer cells. They are characteristic of actively growing cells, including many functions in genetic information transfer and storage. They are probably formed from the nuclear envelope.

Similar membranes are found in both the cytoplasm and nucleoplasm. In the nucleoplasm, they are small, irregular, and short-lived. It has been established that in some conditions ribosomes are directly connected to the annulate lamellar membrane, supposing a role in the process of protein synthesis.

== See also ==
- Cell membranes
- Nuclear envelope
