= List of talpids =

Species in mammal family Talpidae

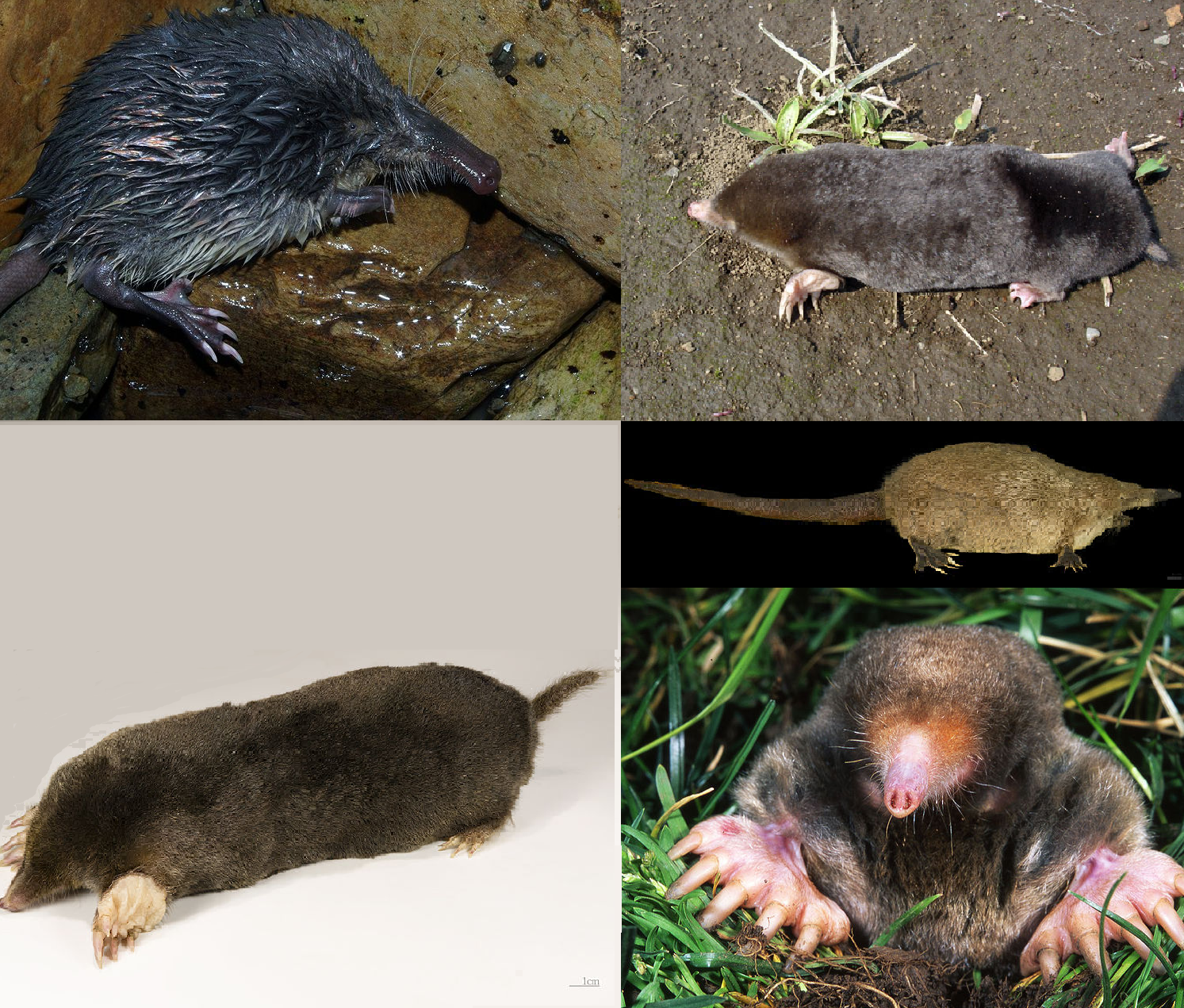
Clockwise from top right: Small Japanese mole (Mogera imaizumii), Russian desman (Desmana moschata), Eastern mole (Scalopus aquaticus), European mole (Talpa europaea), Pyrenean desman (Galemys pyrenaicus)

Talpidae is one of the four families of small mammals in the order Eulipotyphla. A member of this family is called a talpid and the family includes moles, shrew moles, and desmans. Talpids are found in North America, Europe, and Asia, primarily in forests, shrublands, grasslands, and wetlands, though some species can also be found in deserts or coastal areas. They range in size from the Chinese shrew mole, at 6 cm (2 in) plus a 5 cm (2 in) tail, to the Russian desman, at 22 cm (9 in) plus a 22 cm (9 in) tail. Talpids primarily eat earthworms, insects, and other invertebrates, but some also consume fish, mollusks, amphibians, crustaceans, plants, and fungi. No talpids have population estimates, but the Pyrenean desman and Echigo mole are categorized as endangered species, while the Russian desman is categorized as critically endangered.

The forty-five extant species of Talpidae are divided into three subfamilies: Scalopinae, containing seven mole species in five genera, Talpinae, containing thirty-three mole, shrew mole, and desman species in eleven genera, and Uropsilinae, containing four shrew mole species in a single genus. A few extinct prehistoric Talpidae species have been discovered, though due to ongoing research and discoveries the exact number and categorization is not fixed.

== Conventions ==
IUCN Red List categories
Conservation status
- EX: Extinct (0 species)
- EW: Extinct in the wild (0 species)
- CR: Critically endangered (1 species)
- EN: Endangered (2 species)
- VU: Vulnerable (1 species)
- NT: Near threatened (3 species)
- LC: Least concern (36 species)

Other categories
- DD: Data deficient (1 species)
- NE: Not evaluated (0 species)

The author citation for the species or genus is given after the scientific name; parentheses around the author citation indicate that this was not the original taxonomic placement. Conservation status codes listed follow the International Union for Conservation of Nature (IUCN) Red List of Threatened Species. Range maps are provided wherever possible; if a range map is not available, a description of the talpid's range is provided. Ranges are based on the IUCN Red List for that species unless otherwise noted.

== Classification ==
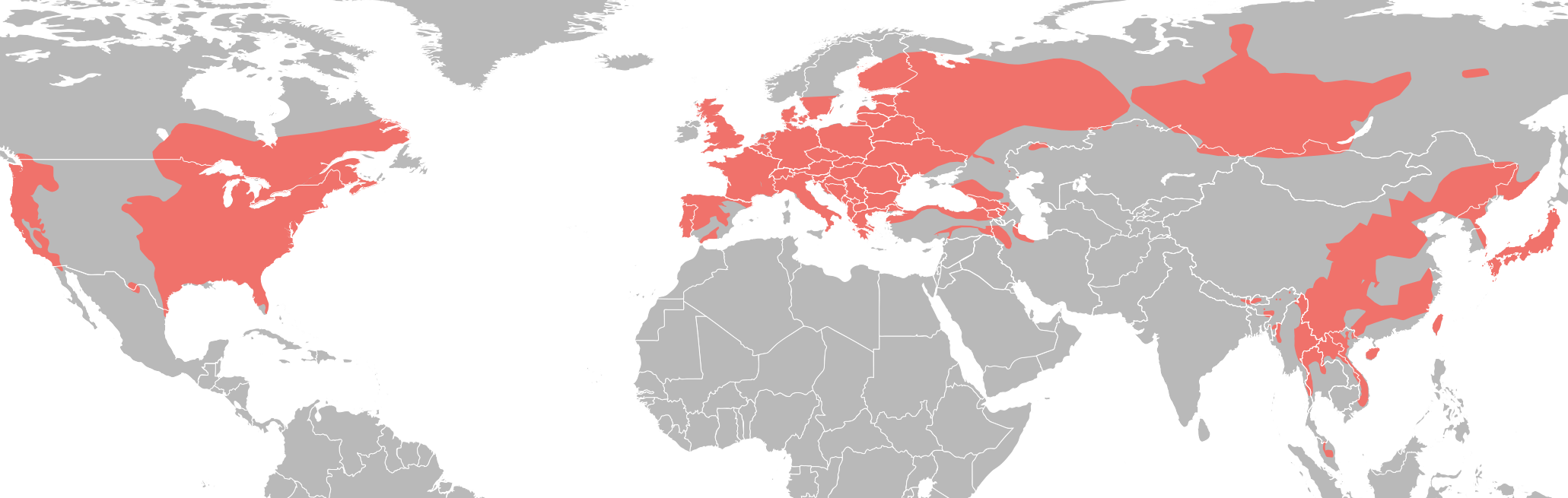
Talpidae distribution

The family Talpidae consists of forty-five extant species in three subfamilies: Scalopinae, containing seven mole species in five genera, Talpinae, containing thirty-three mole, shrew mole, and desman species in eleven genera, and Uropsilinae, containing four shrew mole species in a single genus.

Family Talpidae

- Subfamily Scalopinae
  - Genus Condylura (star-nosed mole): one species
  - Genus Parascalops (hairy-tailed mole): one species
  - Genus Scalopus (eastern mole): one species
  - Genus Scapanulus (Gansu mole): one species
  - Genus Scapanus (western moles): three species
- Subfamily Talpinae
  - Genus Desmana (Russian desman): one species
  - Genus Dymecodon (True's shrew mole): one species
  - Genus Euroscaptor (Asiatic moles): seven species
  - Genus Galemys (Pyrenean desman): one species
  - Genus Mogera (East Asian moles): seven species
  - Genus Neurotrichus (American shrew mole): one species
  - Genus Parascaptor (white-tailed mole): one species
  - Genus Scaptochirus (short-faced mole): one species
  - Genus Scaptonyx (long-tailed mole): one species
  - Genus Talpa (European moles): eleven species
  - Genus Urotrichus (Japanese shrew mole): one species
- Subfamily Uropsilinae
  - Genus Uropsilus (shrew-like moles): four species

- Talpidae
  - - Scalopinae
      - - - Scapanulus
          - Parascalops
        - - Scalopus
          - Scapanus
      - Condylura
    - Talpinae
      - - Desmana
        - Galemys
      - - - Scaptonyx
          - - - Urotrichus
              - Dymecodon
            - Neurotrichus
        - - Talpa
          - - - Euroscaptor
              - Mogera
            - - Parascaptor
              - Neurotrichus
  - - Uropsilinae
      Uropsilus

== Talpids ==
The following classification is based on the taxonomy described by the reference work Mammal Species of the World (2005), with augmentation by generally accepted proposals made since using molecular phylogenetic analysis, as supported by both the IUCN and the American Society of Mammalogists.

=== Subfamily Scalopinae ===
Genus Condylura – Illiger, 1811 – one species
Common name	Scientific name and subspecies	Range	Size and ecology	IUCN status and estimated population
Star-nosed mole	C. cristata (Linnaeus, 1758)	Eastern United States and Canada	Size: 10–13 cm (4–5 in) long, plus 5–9 cm (2–4 in) tail Habitat: Forest, shrubland, and inland wetlands Diet: Aquatic invertebrates, as well as other invertebrates, crustaceans, mollusks and small fish	LC Unknown

Genus Parascalops – True, 1894 – one species
Common name	Scientific name and subspecies	Range	Size and ecology	IUCN status and estimated population
Hairy-tailed mole	P. breweri (Bachman, 1842)	Eastern United States and Canada	Size: 13–18 cm (5–7 in) long, plus 3 cm (1 in) tail Habitat: Forest, shrubland, and grassland Diet: Insects, as well as other invertebrates	LC Unknown

Genus Scalopus – Geoffroy, 1803 – one species
Common name	Scientific name and subspecies	Range	Size and ecology	IUCN status and estimated population
Eastern mole	S. aquaticus (Linnaeus, 1758) Four subspecies: S. a. anastasae (Anastasia Island mole); S. a. aquaticus (Eastern mole); S. a. bassi (Englewood mole); S. a. texanus (Presidia mole)	Eastern and central North America	Size: 14–19 cm (6–7 in) long, plus 1–4 cm (0.4–1.6 in) tail Habitat: Forest and grassland Diet: Insects and earthworms, as well as plants	LC Unknown

Genus Scapanulus – Thomas, 1912 – one species
Common name	Scientific name and subspecies	Range	Size and ecology	IUCN status and estimated population
Gansu mole	S. oweni Thomas, 1912	Central China	Size: 9–11 cm (4 in) long, plus 3–4 cm (1–2 in) tail Habitat: Forest Diet: Earthworms and other invertebrates	LC Unknown

Genus Scapanus – Pomel, 1848 – three species
Common name	Scientific name and subspecies	Range	Size and ecology	IUCN status and estimated population
Coast mole	S. orarius (True, 1896) Two subspecies: S. o. orarius; S. o. schefferi (Scheffer's coast mole)	Western United States and Canada	Size: 13–19 cm (5–7 in) long, plus 3–5 cm (1–2 in) tail Habitat: Forest, grassland, and coastal marine Diet: Earthworms, as well as other invertebrates, mollusks, plants, and fungi	LC Unknown
Northern broad-footed mole	S. latimanus (Bachman, 1842) Six subspecies: S. l. anthonyi (Mexican mole); S. l. insularis; S. l. latimanus; S. l. minusculus; S. l. occultus (Southern broad-footed mole); S. l. parvus	Western United States and Mexico	Size: 11–19 cm (4–7 in) long, plus 2–6 cm (1–2 in) tail Habitat: Grassland, savanna, and forest Diet: Earthworms and other invertebrates	LC Unknown
Townsend's mole	S. townsendii (Bachman, 1839)	Western United States and Canada	Size: 11–19 cm (4–7 in) long, plus 2–6 cm (1–2 in) tail Habitat: Forest and grassland Diet: Earthworms, as well as other invertebrates and plants	LC Unknown

=== Subfamily Talpinae ===
Genus Desmana – Güldenstädt, 1777 – one species
Common name	Scientific name and subspecies	Range	Size and ecology	IUCN status and estimated population
Russian desman	D. moschata (Linnaeus, 1758)	Western and central Asia	Size: 18–22 cm (7–9 in) long, plus 17–22 cm (7–9 in) tail Habitat: Inland wetlands Diet: Fish, mollusks, amphibians, crustaceans, and insects	CR Unknown

Genus Dymecodon – True, 1886 – one species
Common name	Scientific name and subspecies	Range	Size and ecology	IUCN status and estimated population
True's shrew mole	D. pilirostris (True, 1886)	Japan	Size: 6–11 cm (2–4 in) long, plus 2–5 cm (1–2 in) tail Habitat: Forest, shrubland, and grassland Diet: Worms, insects, and other invertebrates	LC Unknown

Genus Euroscaptor – Miller, 1940 – seven species
Common name	Scientific name and subspecies	Range	Size and ecology	IUCN status and estimated population
Greater Chinese mole	E. grandis Miller, 1940	Southern China	Size: About 15 cm (6 in) long, plus 10 cm (4 in) tail Habitat: Forest Diet: Insects and other invertebrates	LC Unknown
Himalayan mole	E. micrura (Hodgson, 1841)	Southern Asia	Size: 12–14 cm (5–6 in) long, plus 5–9 cm (2–4 in) tail Habitat: Forest Diet: Insects and other invertebrates	LC Unknown
Japanese mountain mole	E. mizura (Günther, 1880)	Japan	Size: About 10 cm (4 in) long, plus 2 cm (1 in) tail Habitat: Forest and grassland Diet: Insects and other invertebrates	LC Unknown
Kloss's mole	E. klossi (Thomas, 1929)	Southeastern Asia	Size: 12–14 cm (5–6 in) long, plus 11–17 cm (4–7 in) tail Habitat: Forest Diet: Insects and other invertebrates	LC Unknown
Long-nosed mole	E. longirostris (A. Milne-Edwards, 1870)	Southeastern China	Size: 9–15 cm (4–6 in) long, plus 1–3 cm (0.4–1.2 in) tail Habitat: Forest Diet: Insects and other invertebrates	LC Unknown
Small-toothed mole	E. parvidens Miller, 1940	Southeastern Asia	Size: About 14 cm (6 in) long, plus 6 cm (2 in) tail Habitat: Forest Diet: Insects and other invertebrates	NT Unknown
Vietnamese mole	E. subanura Kawada, Son, & Can, 2012	Northern Vietnam	Size: 7–9 cm (3–4 in) long, plus 4–6 cm (2–2 in) tail Habitat: Forest Diet: Insects and other invertebrates	LC Unknown

Genus Galemys – Kaup, 1829 – one species
Common name	Scientific name and subspecies	Range	Size and ecology	IUCN status and estimated population
Pyrenean desman	G. pyrenaicus (Geoffroy, 1811) Two subspecies: G. p. pyrenaicus; G. p. rufulus	Iberian Peninsula	Size: 11–16 cm (4–6 in) long, plus 12–16 cm (5–6 in) tail Habitat: Inland wetlands Diet: Insects and crustaceans	EN Unknown

Genus Mogera – Pomel, 1848 – seven species
Common name	Scientific name and subspecies	Range	Size and ecology	IUCN status and estimated population
Echigo mole	M. etigo Yoshiyuki & Imaizumi, 1991	Central Japan	Size: 15–18 cm (6–7 in) long, plus 2–3 cm (1 in) tail Habitat: Grassland Diet: Likely earthworms and other invertebrates	EN Unknown
Insular mole	M. insularis Swinhoe, 1863 Three subspecies: M. i. hainana; M. i. insularis; M. i. latouchei (La Touche's mole)	Eastern China, Hainan Island, and Taiwan	Size: 8–14 cm (3–6 in) long, plus 1–2 cm (0.4–0.8 in) tail Habitat: Forest Diet: Likely earthworms and other invertebrates	LC Unknown
Japanese mole	M. wogura (Temminck, 1842)	Southern Japan	Size: 12–18 cm (5–7 in) long, plus 1–3 cm (0.4–1.2 in) tail Habitat: Grassland, shrubland, and forest Diet: Likely earthworms and other invertebrates	LC Unknown
Sado mole	M. tokudae Kuroda, 1940	Sado Island, Japan	Size: 13–17 cm (5–7 in) long, plus 2–3 cm (1 in) tail Habitat: Forest, shrubland, and grassland Diet: Likely earthworms and other invertebrates	NT Unknown
Senkaku mole	M. uchidai Abe, Shiraishi, & Arai, 1991	Senkaku Islands	Size: About 13 cm (5 in) long, plus 2 cm (1 in) tail Habitat: Grassland Diet: Likely earthworms and other invertebrates	VU Unknown
Small Japanese mole	M. imaizumii Kuroda, 1957	Japan	Size: 10–16 cm (4–6 in) long, plus 1–3 cm (0.4–1.2 in) tail Habitat: Forest, shrubland, and grassland Diet: Likely earthworms and other invertebrates	LC Unknown
Ussuri mole	M. robusta Nehring, 1891	Eastern Asia	Size: 14–20 cm (6–8 in) long, plus about 2 cm (1 in) tail Habitat: Forest Diet: Earthworms, caterpillars and insects	LC Unknown

Genus Neurotrichus – Günther, 1880 – one species
Common name	Scientific name and subspecies	Range	Size and ecology	IUCN status and estimated population
American shrew mole	N. gibbsii (Baird, 1858)	Western North America	Size: 6–9 cm (2–4 in) long, plus 3–5 cm (1–2 in) tail Habitat: Forest, shrubland, grassland, and inland wetlands Diet: Earthworms, insects, other invertebrates, fungi, and seeds	LC Unknown

Genus Parascaptor – Gill, 1875 – one species
Common name	Scientific name and subspecies	Range	Size and ecology	IUCN status and estimated population
White-tailed mole	P. leucura (Blyth, 1850)	Eastern Asia	Size: 11–12 cm (4–5 in) long, plus 1–2 cm (0.4–0.8 in) tail Habitat: Forest Diet: Likely earthworms and other invertebrates	LC Unknown

Genus Scaptochirus – H. Milne-Edwards, 1867 – one species
Common name	Scientific name and subspecies	Range	Size and ecology	IUCN status and estimated population
Short-faced mole	S. moschatus H. Milne-Edwards, 1867	Northern China	Size: About 14 cm (6 in) long, plus 1–2 cm (0.4–0.8 in) tail Habitat: Desert and grassland Diet: Arthropod larvae	LC Unknown

Genus Scaptonyx – H. Milne-Edwards, 1872 – one species
Common name	Scientific name and subspecies	Range	Size and ecology	IUCN status and estimated population
Long-tailed mole	S. fusicaudus H. Milne-Edwards, 1872	Eastern Asia	Size: 6–9 cm (2–4 in) long, plus 4–6 cm (2 in) tail Habitat: Forest Diet: Likely earthworms and other invertebrates	LC Unknown

Genus Talpa – Linnaeus, 1758 – eleven species
Common name	Scientific name and subspecies	Range	Size and ecology	IUCN status and estimated population
Altai mole	T. altaica Nikolsky, 1833	Northern Asia	Size: 9–18 cm (4–7 in) long, plus 1–4 cm (0.4–1.6 in) tail Habitat: Forest Diet: Earthworms, as well as insects	LC Unknown
Balkan mole	T. stankovici Martino & Martino, 1931	Balkans in Europe	Size: 9–18 cm (4–7 in) long, plus 1–4 cm (0.4–1.6 in) tail Habitat: Coastal marine Diet: Worms and insects	LC Unknown
Blind mole	T. caeca Savi, 1822	Southern Europe	Size: 9–18 cm (4–7 in) long, plus 1–4 cm (0.4–1.6 in) tail Habitat: Forest and grassland Diet: Earthworms and other invertebrates	LC Unknown
Caucasian mole	T. caucasica Satunin, 1908	Caucasus Mountains in Russia and Georgia	Size: 9–18 cm (4–7 in) long, plus 1–4 cm (0.4–1.6 in) tail Habitat: Forest and grassland Diet: Earthworms, as well as insects	LC Unknown
European mole	T. europaea Linnaeus, 1758	Europe and western Asia	Size: 11–16 cm (4–6 in) long, plus 2–4 cm (1–2 in) tail Habitat: Forest, shrubland, and grassland Diet: Earthworms and insects	LC Unknown
Levant mole	T. levantis Thomas, 1906	Caucasus and Northern Turkey	Size: 9–18 cm (4–7 in) long, plus 1–4 cm (0.4–1.6 in) tail Habitat: Forest and grassland Diet: Earthworms and other invertebrates	LC Unknown
Ognev's mole	T. ognevi Stroganov, 1948	Georgia and northeastern Turkey	Size: 9–18 cm (4–7 in) long, plus 1–4 cm (0.4–1.6 in) tail Habitat: Forest and grassland Diet: Worms and insects	LC Unknown
Père David's mole	T. davidiana (H. Milne-Edwards, 1884)	Turkey and northwestern Iran	Size: 9–18 cm (4–7 in) long, plus 1–4 cm (0.4–1.6 in) tail Habitat: Grassland Diet: Worms and insects	DD Unknown
Roman mole	T. romana Thomas, 1902	Southern Italy	Size: 9–18 cm (4–7 in) long, plus 1–4 cm (0.4–1.6 in) tail Habitat: Forest Diet: Earthworms	LC Unknown
Spanish mole	T. occidentalis A. Cabrera, 1907	Spain and Portugal	Size: 9–18 cm (4–7 in) long, plus 1–4 cm (0.4–1.6 in) tail Habitat: Forest, shrubland, and grassland Diet: Earthworms and other invertebrates	LC Unknown
Talysch mole	T. talyschensis Vereshchagin, 1945	Southern Azerbaijan and northern Iran	Size: 9–18 cm (4–7 in) long, plus 1–4 cm (0.4–1.6 in) tail Habitat: Forest and shrubland Diet: Worms and insects	LC Unknown

Genus Urotrichus – Temminck, 1841 – one species
Common name	Scientific name and subspecies	Range	Size and ecology	IUCN status and estimated population
Japanese shrew mole	U. talpoides Temminck, 1841	Japan	Size: 6–11 cm (2–4 in) long, plus 2–5 cm (1–2 in) tail Habitat: Forest, shrubland, and grassland Diet: Insects, spiders, worms, and other invertebrates	LC Unknown

=== Subfamily Uropsilinae ===
Genus Uropsilus – A. Milne-Edwards, 1871 – four species
Common name	Scientific name and subspecies	Range	Size and ecology	IUCN status and estimated population
Anderson's shrew mole	U. andersoni (Thomas, 1911)	Central China	Size: 6–9 cm (2–4 in) long, plus 5–8 cm (2–3 in) tail Habitat: Unknown Diet: Invertebrates	NT Unknown
Chinese shrew mole	U. soricipes A. Milne-Edwards, 1871	Central China	Size: 6–8 cm (2–3 in) long, plus 5–7 cm (2–3 in) tail Habitat: Forest Diet: Invertebrates	LC Unknown
Gracile shrew mole	U. gracilis (Thomas, 1911)	Southern China and northern Myanmar	Size: 6–9 cm (2–4 in) long, plus 5–8 cm (2–3 in) tail Habitat: Forest, shrubland, and grassland Diet: Invertebrates	LC Unknown
Inquisitive shrew mole	U. investigator (Thomas, 1922)	Southern China	Size: 6–9 cm (2–4 in) long, plus 5–8 cm (2–3 in) tail Habitat: Forest and grassland Diet: Invertebrates	LC Unknown

== Sources ==
- Nowak, Ronald M. (1999). Walker's Mammals of the World. Vol. 1. Johns Hopkins University Press. ISBN 978-0-8018-5789-8.
- Smith, Andrew T.; Xie, Yan, eds. (2010). A Guide to the Mammals of China. Princeton University Press. ISBN 978-1-4008-3411-2.
- Hutterer, Rainer (2005). Wilson, Don E.; Reeder, DeeAnn M. (eds.). Mammal Species of the World. Vol. 1 (3rd ed.). Johns Hopkins University Press. ISBN 978-0-8018-8221-0.
