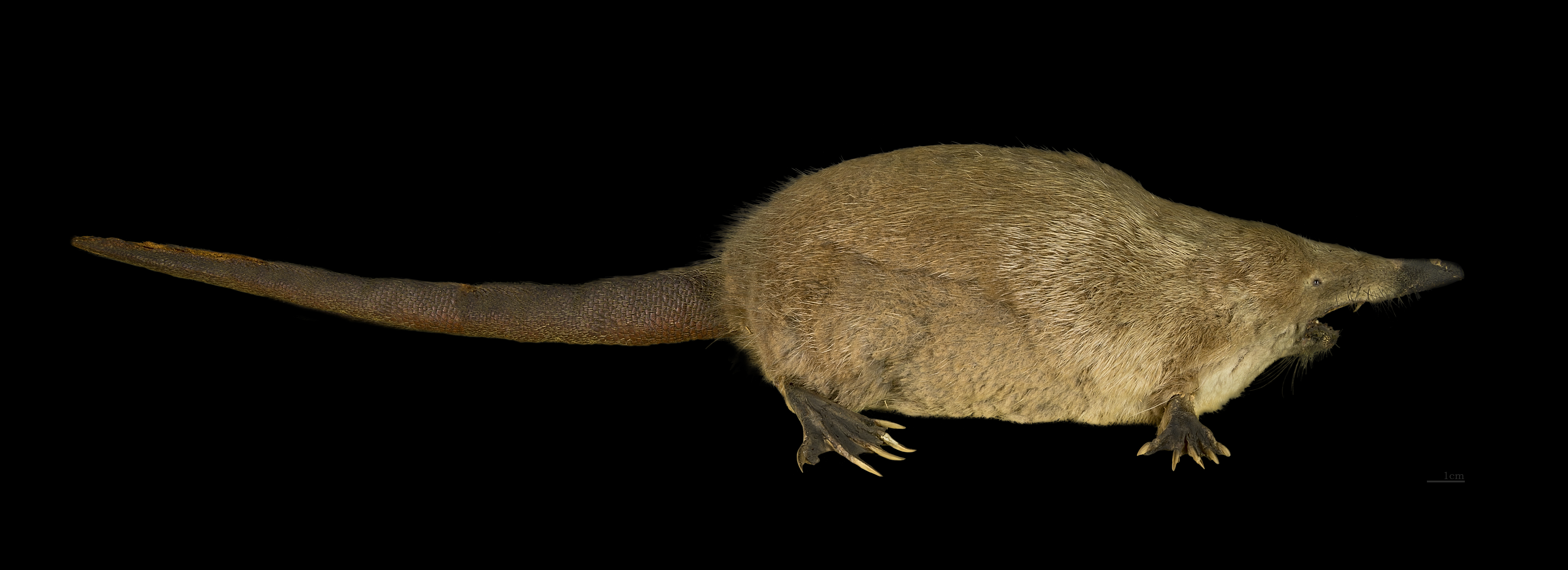
- Russian desman (Desmana moschata)

Scientific classification
- Kingdom: Animalia
- Phylum: Chordata
- Class: Mammalia
- Order: Eulipotyphla
- Family: Talpidae
- Subfamily: Talpinae; G. Fischer, 1814

Genera
- See species list

= Talpinae =

Subfamily of mammals

The subfamily Talpinae, sometimes called "Old World moles" or "Old World moles and relatives", is one of three subfamilies of the mole family Talpidae, the others being the Scalopinae, or New World moles, and the Uropsilinae, or shrew-like moles.

These mammals in the order Eulipotyphla mainly live under ground. The species in this group are all found in Eurasia, except Neurotrichus gibbsii. Most species have front paws specialized for tunneling which are clawed and face outwards from the body. They mainly eat insects and other small invertebrates.

== Taxonomy ==
Although most systems recognize this subfamily as monophyletic, some studies indicate that it as currently defined is paraphyletic with respect to the Scalopinae, with Desmanini being the most basal member, then a clade comprising Neurotrichini, Scaptonychini, and Urotrichini, then the Condylurini (otherwise classified in the Scalopinae), and then Talpini and Scalopini being sister groups to one another.

The list of species is:

- Subfamily Talpinae
  - Tribe Desmanini
    - Genus Desmana
      - Russian desman, Desmana moschata
    - Genus Galemys
      - Pyrenean desman, Galemys pyrenaicus
  - Tribe Neurotrichini
    - Genus Neurotrichus
      - American shrew mole, Neurotrichus gibbsii
  - Tribe Scaptonychini
    - Genus Scaptonyx
      - Long-tailed mole, Scaptonyx fusicauda
  - Tribe Talpini
    - Genus Euroscaptor
      - Greater Chinese mole, E. grandis
      - Kloss's mole, E. klossi
      - Kuznetsov's mole, E. kuznetsovi
      - Long-nosed mole, E. longirostris
      - Malaysian mole, E. malayanus
      - Himalayan mole, E. micrurus
      - Ngoc Linh mole, E. ngoclinhensis
      - Orlov's mole, E. orlovi
      - Small-toothed mole, E. parvidens
      - Vietnamese mole, E. subanura
    - Genus Mogera
      - Echigo mole, M. etigo
      - Small Japanese mole, M. imaizumii
      - Insular mole, M. insularis
      - Kano's mole, M. kanoana
      - La Touche's mole, M. latouchei
      - Ussuri mole, M. robusta
      - Sado mole, M. tokudae
      - Senkaku mole, M. uchidai
      - Japanese mole, M. wogura
    - Genus Oreoscaptor
      - Japanese mountain mole, O. mizura
    - Genus Parascaptor
      - White-tailed mole, P. leucura
    - Genus Scaptochirus - China
      - Short-faced mole, S. moschatus
    - Genus Talpa
      - Altai mole, T. altaica
      - Aquitanian mole, T. aquitania
      - Blind mole, T. caeca
      - Caucasian mole, T. caucasica
      - Père David's mole, T. davidiana
      - European mole, T. europaea
      - Levant mole, T. levantis
      - Martino's mole, T. martinorum
      - Spanish mole, T. occidentalis
      - Ognev's mole, T. ognevi
      - Roman mole, T. romana
      - Balkan mole, T. stankovici
      - Talysch mole, T. talyschensis
  - Tribe Urotrichini
    - Genus Dymecodon
      - True's shrew mole, Dymecodon pilirostris
    - Genus Urotrichus
      - Japanese shrew mole, Urotrichus talpoides
