= Shrew mole =

A shrew mole or shrew-mole is a mole that resembles a shrew. Species with this name include:

- Five species in the subfamily Uropsilinae, or "shrew-like moles", native to China:
  - Equivalent teeth shrew mole (Uropsilus aequodonenia)
  - Anderson's shrew mole (Uropsilus andersoni)
  - Gracile shrew mole (Uropsilus gracilis)
  - Inquisitive shrew mole (Uropsilus investigator)
  - Chinese shrew mole (Uropsilus soricipes)
- Two species in the tribe Urotrichini, or himizu, native to Japan:
  - Japanese shrew mole (Urotrichus talpoides)
  - True's shrew mole (Dymecodon pilirostris)
- One species in the tribe Neurotrichini, native to Pacific North America:
  - American shrew mole (Neurotrichus gibbsii)

For a list of all mole species, see list of talpids.
