= Dabie Mountains shrew mole =

Scientific classification
- Kingdom: Animalia
- Phylum: Chordata
- Class: Mammalia
- Order: Eulipotyphla
- Family: Talpidae
- Genus: Uropsilus
- Species: U. dabieshanensis

Binomial name
- Uropsilus dabieshanensis Hu et al., 2021

Species of mammal

The Dabie Mountains shrew mole (Uropsilus dabieshanensis) is a species of mammal in the family Talpidae and genus Uropsilus. It is endemic to Anhui Province in China, where, as its name suggests, it is only known from the Dabie Mountains.

Phylogenetic evidence supports it being a sister species to a clade containing the gracile shrew mole (U. gracilis), black-backed shrew mole (U. atronates), and several undescribed species, with U. dabieshanensis diverging from the rest of the genus in the early Pleistocene.

== See also ==
- List of living mammal species described in the 2020s
