= Snow Mountain shrew mole =

Scientific classification
- Kingdom: Animalia
- Phylum: Chordata
- Class: Mammalia
- Order: Eulipotyphla
- Family: Talpidae
- Genus: Uropsilus
- Species: U. nivatus

Binomial name
- Uropsilus nivatus (Allen, 1923)

Species of mammal

The Snow Mountain shrew mole (Uropsilus nivatus) is a species of mammal in the family Talpidae. It is native to Yunnan Province in China and potentially Myanmar. Its common name references Jade Dragon Snow Mountain, which is the type locality of the species. Aside from there, the only other confirmed specimen is from Cang Mountain.

It was formerly considered synonymous with the gracile shrew mole (U. gracilis), but a 2018 phylogenetic study found it to be a distinct species. The study found it to be the second most basal member of Uropsilus (with only the inquisitive shrew mole, U. investigator, being more basal), diverging from the rest of the genus during the early-mid Pliocene.
