= Hoàng Liên National Park =

National park in Vietnam

- Vườn quốc gia Hoàng Liên
- IUCN category II (national park)
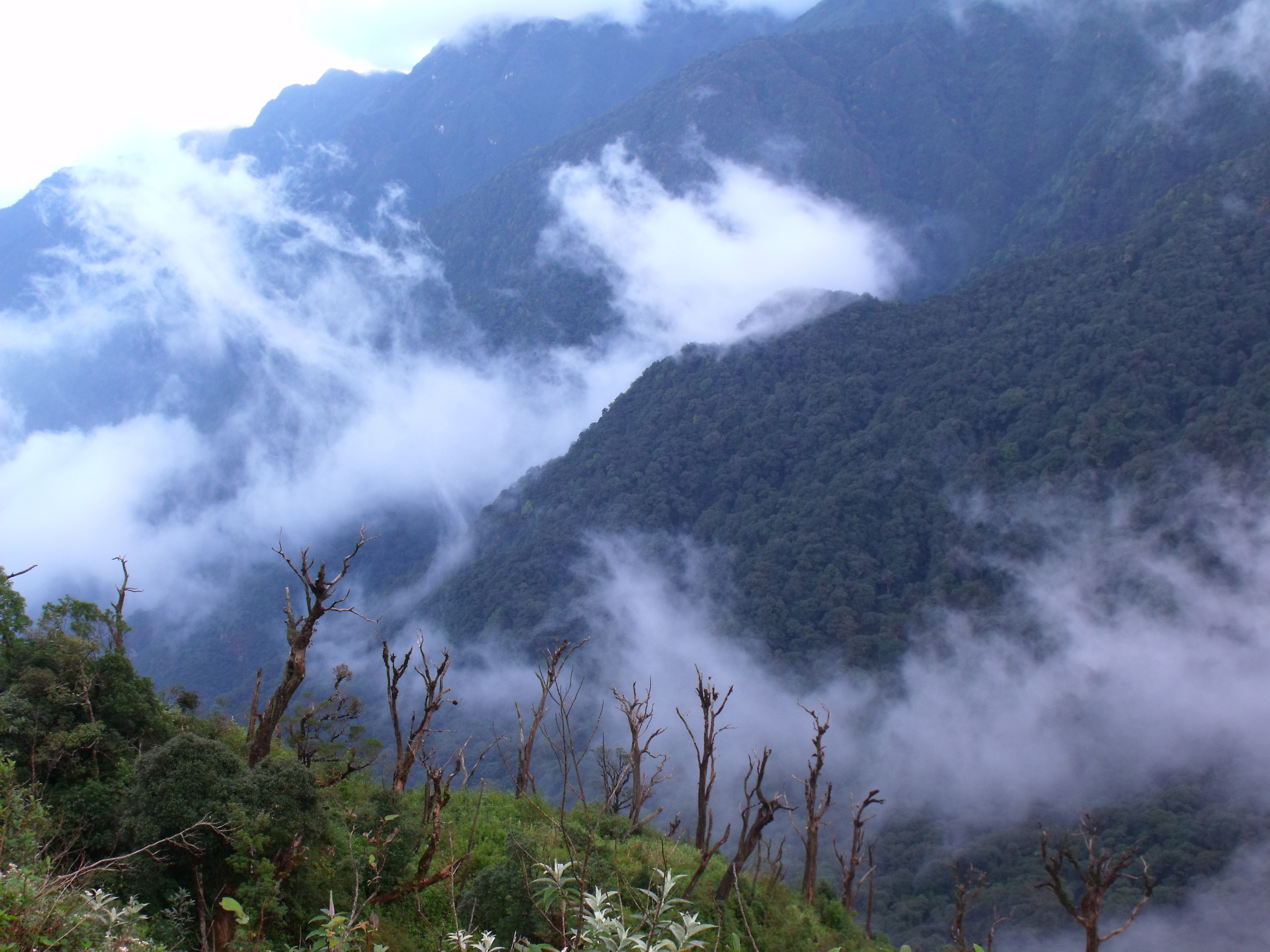
- Part of Hoàng Liên National Park

- Location within Vietnam
- Location: Northern Vietnam
- Nearest city: Hanoi
- Coordinates: 22°15′00″N 103°30′00″E
- Area: 68,569 ha (169,440 acres)
- Established: 2002
- Governing body: UBND of Lào Cai Province
- Website: www.laocai.gov.vn/sites/vuonquocgia/Trang/trangchu.aspx

Hoang Lien National Park (Vietnamese: Vườn quốc gia Hoàng Liên, also known as Hoàng Liên Sơn, Dãy Hoàng Liên) is a national park within Hoang Lien Son Range, in the area of Sa Pa in Lào Cai Province, the area of Than Uyên and part of Phong Thổ area in Lai Châu Province in Northern Vietnam. Its area is 68,569 hectares (264.75 sq mi) with terrain mostly between 1,000 and 3,000 meters above sea level.

The national park was established according to the Decision number 90/2002/QĐ-TTg dated 12 July 2006 by the government of Vietnam. This decision turned the Nature Reserve into a National Park. Hoang Lien National Park is recognized as a part of ASEAN Heritage Parks and a Centre of Plant Diversity in the International Union for Conservation of Nature's (IUCN) Plant Conservation Program.

== Location ==
Hoang Lien National Park is Vietnam's mountainous Northwest and includes Fansipan, the highest mountain in Vietnam and on the Indochinese Peninsula.

The total area of the core national park is 29,845 hectares (115.23 sq mi), which includes a strict protected area of 11,875 ha; a "forest rehabilitation area" of 17,900 ha; and an administration services area of 70 ha. The core part of Hoang Lien National Park is within San Sa Ho, Lao Chai, Ta Van, Ban Ho populated places, Sa Pa district, Lao Cai Province, and a part of Muong Khoa, Than Thuoc communes, Than Uyen district.

The total peripheral area, the Hoang Lien Son-Van Ban section, is 38,724 hectares (149.51 sq mi), consisting of Sa Pa town and a few communes within Sa Pa and Van Ban districts, Lao Cai Province; and 2 communes within Phong Tho district, Lai Chau. There are six ethnic groups living in this area, with Dao and H'mong people being the majority.

== Biodiversity ==
Hoang Lien National Park is home to numerous species of plants and animals, many of which are rare and endangered.

=== Flora and fauna ===
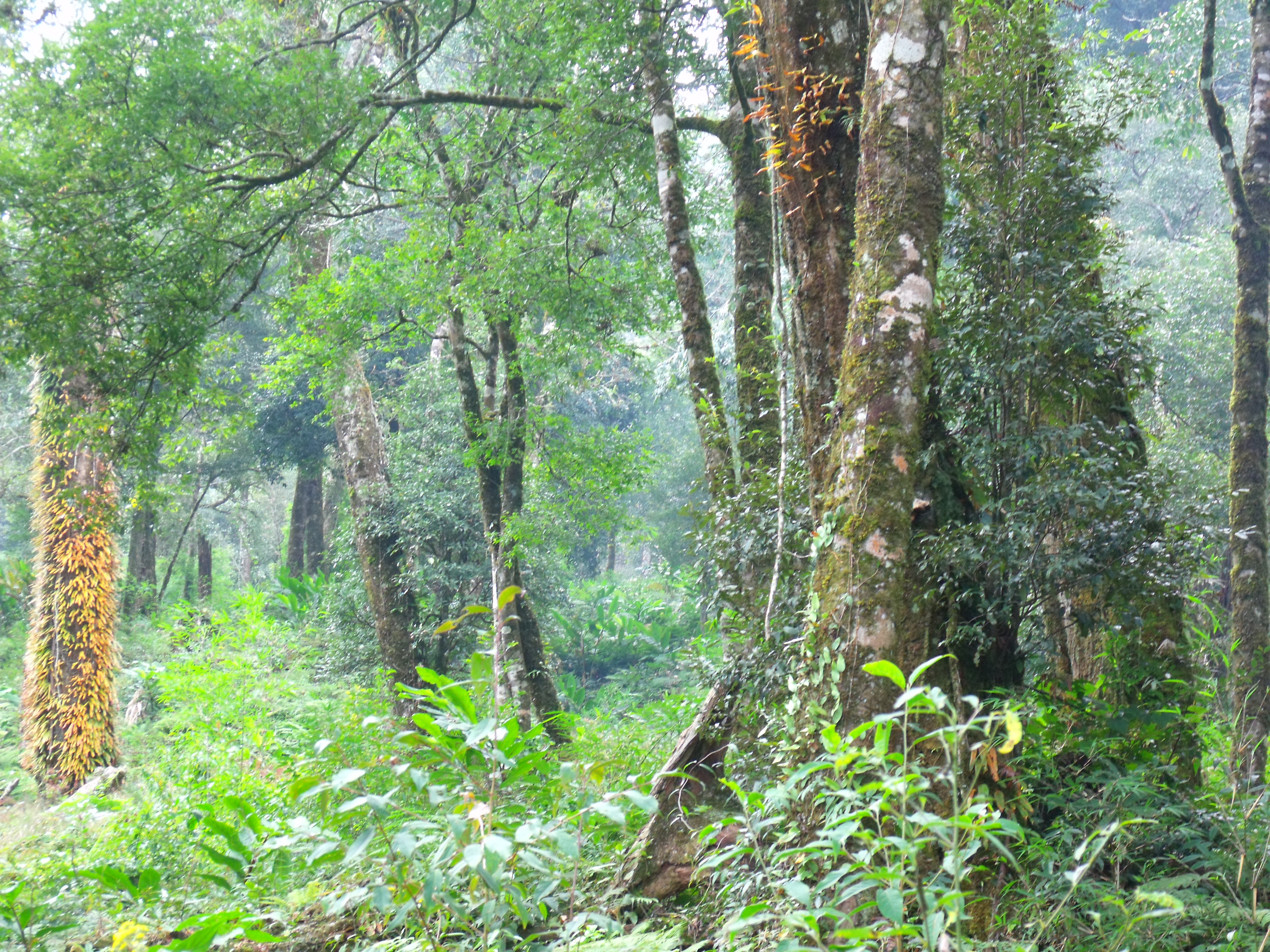
Evergreen forest at 2,200 metres (7,200 ft)

Over 3000 plant species have been recorded in the park, including many endemic and endangered species. The mountainous terrain of the park means distinct altitudinal zonation is seen, with the flora changing from tropical plants at low elevations to temperate alpine plants at high elevations. An estimated amount of 25 percent of Vietnam's endemic plants are found on Fansipan mountain.

=== Butterflies and Moths ===
At the turn of the century, a total of 199 butterfly species had been observed in Hoang Lien National Park. For moths, the Tortricid Fansipaniana is named after the mountain, which is the type locality; other records include 78 species of sphynx moths and a total of 286 species of Noctuidae.

=== Vertebrates ===
There are ten species of animals and four species of birds which are globally endangered were recorded in the park, including the Fansipan shrew mole. The population of mammals in Hoang Lien National Park is low due to poaching.

In 1999, it is recorded that there are 347 bird species in and around the nature reserve, including 49 species that are restricted in Vietnam to North-west Tonkin. Fansipan is the type locality for the snake Protobothrops cornutus and about one-third of amphibian species present in Vietnam can be found in the park. A total of 38 different anuran (frogs and toads) species were observed in Hoang Lien National Park in 1997–1998.

== See also ==
- Fansipan, a mountain in the national park
- Southeast Asian Massif, a term describing the mountainous uplands
