= Black-backed shrew mole =

Scientific classification
- Kingdom: Animalia
- Phylum: Chordata
- Class: Mammalia
- Order: Eulipotyphla
- Family: Talpidae
- Genus: Uropsilus
- Species: U. atronates

Binomial name
- Uropsilus atronates (Allen, 1923)

Species of mammal

The black-backed shrew mole (Uropsilus atronates) is a species of mammal in the family Talpidae. It is endemic to China, where it is only known from the vicinity of Mucheng in Yunnan Province.

It was first named as a subspecies of Anderson's shrew mole, Rhynchonax andersoni atronates, by Glover Morrill Allen in 1923. Later it was considered synonymous with the gracile shrew mole (U. gracilis), but a 2018 phylogenetic study found it to be a distinct species. The study found it to be sister species to a clade comprising U. gracilis and a putative undescribed species of Uropsilus. Both groups likely diverged during the early-mid Pleistocene.
