= Fansipan shrew mole =

Scientific classification
- Kingdom: Animalia
- Phylum: Chordata
- Class: Mammalia
- Order: Eulipotyphla
- Family: Talpidae
- Genus: Uropsilus
- Species: U. fansipanensis

Binomial name
- Uropsilus fansipanensis Bui, Okabe, Le, Nguyen, & Motokawa, 2023

Species of mammal

The Fansipan shrew mole (Uropsilus fansipanensis) is a shrew-like mole native to Vietnam.

== See also ==
- List of living mammal species described in the 2020s
