= Equivalent-teeth shrew mole =

Scientific classification
- Kingdom: Animalia
- Phylum: Chordata
- Class: Mammalia
- Order: Eulipotyphla
- Family: Talpidae
- Genus: Uropsilus
- Species: U. aequodonenia

Binomial name
- Uropsilus aequodonenia Y. Liu et al., 2013

Species of mammal

The equivalent-teeth shrew mole (Uropsilus aequodonenia) is a species of mammal in the family Talpidae. It is endemic to Sichuan, China. It is characterized by having nine teeth in the row above and nine teeth in the lower row. The data indicate that it is the sister taxon of U. andersoni. Its specific name, aequodonenia, means 'equivalent teeth' in Latin.
