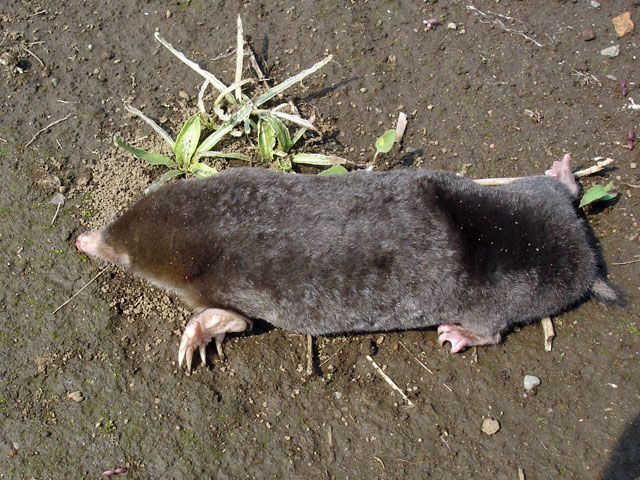

Conservation status
- Least Concern (IUCN 3.1)

Scientific classification
- Kingdom: Animalia
- Phylum: Chordata
- Class: Mammalia
- Order: Eulipotyphla
- Family: Talpidae
- Genus: Mogera
- Species: M. i. . H. 2. (.) K. 1957)

Binomial name
- Mogera imaizumii Hutterer, 2005 (Kuroda 1957) Kuroda, 1936
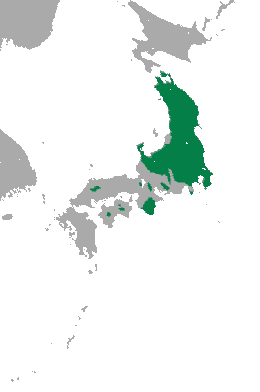
- Small Japanese mole range

Synonyms
- Mogera wogura minor Kuroda, 1936; Talpa micrura imaizumii (Kuroda, 1957); Mogera minor Hutterer, 1993

= Small Japanese mole =

Species of mammal

The small Japanese mole, lesser Japanese mole or Japanese Eastern Mole (Mogera imaizumii) is a species of mammal in the family Talpidae. It is endemic to Japan.

== Distribution ==
Populations of the species occur mostly in Eastern and Northern Honshū (mainland of Japan). Namely, Shizuoka, Nagano, and Ishikawa Prefectures and further north up to the mountainous edges of the Shimokita Peninsula. except for a portion of the Echigo Plain of Niigata Prefecture. They are also found in sporadic populations in mountainous regions in the West and South, (Note: "西南本州で確認される本種は、"西南本州では山地に飛石的に分布しているにすぎない") in mountains terrains within Kyoto Prefecture and the city of Shōbara, Hiroshima, in the Suzuka Mountains in Mie, southern Kii Peninsula (Wakayama), Mount Tsurugi, Mount Ishizuchi, etc. in Shikoku, and parts of Shōdo Island. It is endemic to Japan.

Although it can still be found within the inner city (23 wards of Tokyo) in places where crop fields remain, but they become scarce when such sites undergo urban development. For example, they are rarely spotted inside the circular track of the Yamanote Line. However, it is found within the grounds of the Imperial Palace. These moles were cut off from the surrounding environment after the completion of the palace moat in the 1630s, and the isolated gene pool is thought to have survived since then within the palace grounds. However, DNA sequence studies have shown the population to have a 98.5% close match to the genetics of moles found in Hino, Tokyo and confirmed to be the same species as the M. imaizumii of the Kantō region. (Note: There are alsopockets of sites in the Tokyo area where the mole has been extirpated, but some specimens have been preserved which were used in the comparative DNA study.)

=== Mole war ===
Thus eastern Japan is essentially the "territory" of the lesser Japanese mole (azuma mogura, lit. "eastern mole"), and western Japan is the territory of the Japanese mole (M. wogura, referred to as the "Kobe mole" in Japan). This competition over habitat has been dubbed mogura sensō (モグラ戦争; "mole war"), and the boundary ("front") was once west of Mount Fuji (Shizuoka Prefecture) but moved to Mount Hakone (Kanagawa Prefecture), and later to the northern limits of Mt. Hakone, so that that the encroachment of the bigger species into Kantō may be imminent. Mt. Fuji and Mt. Hakone have corridors of hardened lava flow which are thought to have posed barriers preventing the larger species' encroachment.

The isolated population groups are considered to be remnants of a much more widespread population that once existed in the west, in fact all over Japan, but this older type mole has kept losing its habitat to the bigger species.

It is thought that M. imaizuimi in mountain terrains have been protected from incursion by the M. wogura due to shallower soil layers that are not optimal habitat for the larger species. Kii peninsula and Shōdo Island owing to their cliffs have shallow-soil zones that also prevent their incursion.

== Morphology ==
They measure a full length of 12.1 to 15.9 centimetres (4.8 to 6.3 in), with tail length 1.4 to 2.2 centimetres (0.55 to 0.87 in), weighing 48 to 127 grams (1.7 to 4.5 oz). There is considerable variation in size, and the mountainous populations are smaller while the Pacific coastal plain populations tend to be larger, almost double by weight. They have poor eyesight, and the tails are short. (Note: Which are characteristics common to Moger genus and monotypic Oreoscaptor mizura moles of Japan.) Dark-brown furred in mountainous regions, more brownish tinted in floodplain populations.

The naked (hairless) area on its upper snout is rectangular-shaped. (Note: This trait is common to Moger genus overall in Japan.) Palate of normal size and length. Upper incisors aligned in widened V-shape fashion. 3 upper premolars per each (right or left) side, 2 lower premolars per side.

== Komogura types ==
The appellation komogura (コモグラ; lit. "small mole") had been applied to Japanese mammalogists to refer to the dwarf populations dwelling in hilly, mountainous, or plateau habitats, reserving the common name azumamogura (アズマモグラ; lit. "eastern mole") for normal-sized populations in plains, crop fields, etc.

Nagamichi Kuroda had published komogura as subspecies, later renaming it (Mogera wogura minor Kuroda, 1936; Talpa micrura imaizumii (Kuroda, 1957)) But the ASM (American Society of Mammalogists) database registers these as synonym for the species.

== Sexing ==
Female moles close their vaginal openings except during breeding season (though they are not known to close completely in Japanese species), and since males do not have an exterior hanging scrotum either, (Note: Kuroda (1954) generalizes this for the now disused Insectivora order, which he divides into the "no appendix" Lipotyphla sub order and "with appendix" Menotyphla. Quote: "睾丸は会陰部内に留まり,陰嚢はない".), which makes sexing the males and females difficult or easily mistakable. However, anogenital distance (AGD) measurements can be used to determine the sex.

== Behavioral traits ==
Their habitat ranges from grassland plains or farmed lands in the lowlands to forested hills and mountainous terrain, but prefer the moist, deep soil in the plains. They burrow tunnels underground in which they live. The removed soil are taken to the surface to form mole mounds. They live on a cycle of shifting from activity to rest 3 times a day.

In February 2025, a Yamagata University team reported on the distribution densities of the species in mountain forests, with quantified population analysis comparing different sites. The study involved thorough investigation of the species' tunnels found while trekking the hiking paths, and found that the population density varied greatly according to the forest type (vegetation) and soil environments, and that abundance of earthworms correlated with the mole's abundance.。

Although they mainly prey on insects and earthworms, they also feed on soil centipedes, leeches, and plant seeds.

They build their nest deep in the forest, about 40 centimetres (16 in) diameter and 36 centimetres (14 in) height, where they gather deciduous leaves for lining, in order to breed. They have their litter in the spring (sometimes fall), with 1 to 6 pups per birth. A study of the microsatellite genetic markers on the mother and 3 offspring revealed a single father for the offspring. and follow-up studies using greater number of samples is anticipated. Their lifespan is approximately 3 years.

== Conservation status ==
The species as a whole is rated least concern conservation status by the IUCN.

The Red Data Book for some of the prefectures across Japan have listed the species' endangered statuses as follows:

- Aichi・Ehime - Concern II (VU -vulnerable)
- Kyoto, Tottori, Hiroshima, Kagawa, Kochi - NT
- Shiga - Rare species
- Yamaguchi - Information lacking
