= Orlov's mole =

Scientific classification
- Kingdom: Animalia
- Phylum: Chordata
- Class: Mammalia
- Order: Eulipotyphla
- Family: Talpidae
- Genus: Euroscaptor
- Species: E. orlovi

Binomial name
- Euroscaptor orlovi Zemlemerova, Bannikova, Lebedev, Rozhnov, & Abramov, 2016
- Orlov's mole range

Species of mole

Orlov's mole (Euroscaptor orlovi) is a species of mammal in the family Talpidae. It is known from northern Vietnam, southern China, and possibly Laos. It was named after Russian zoologist Nikolai L. Orlov of the Russian Academy of Sciences.

== Taxonomy ==
E. orlovi and its sister species, Kuznetsov's mole (E. kuznetsovi) were formerly considered populations of the long-nosed mole (E. longirostris), but a 2016 study found sufficient genetic divergence to split the populations as distinct species. The Red River likely serves as the geographical barrier separating E. orlovi from E. kuznetsovi.

== Distribution ==
It is known from Lào Cai Province in northern Vietnam and Yunnan in southern China. However, it may have a wider distribution in the highlands of northern Laos and in areas of northwestern Vietnam west of the Red River.

== Description ==
It is a large-sized mole comparable in size to E. longirostris. It can be distinguished by its long, club-shaped tail as well as its small, light-built skull with a narrow rostrum compared to E. kuznetsovi. It has shorter toothrows than E. longirostris.
