= Kuznetsov's mole =

Scientific classification
- Kingdom: Animalia
- Phylum: Chordata
- Class: Mammalia
- Order: Eulipotyphla
- Family: Talpidae
- Genus: Euroscaptor
- Species: E. kuznetsovi

Binomial name
- Euroscaptor kuznetsovi Zemlemerova, Bannikova, Lebedev, Rozhnov, & Abramov, 2016

Species of mole

Kuznetsov's mole (Euroscaptor kuznetsovi) is a species of mammal in the family Talpidae. It is found in northern Vietnam and southern China. It was named after Russian mammalogist German V. Kuznetsov of the Russian Academy of Sciences.

== Taxonomy ==
E. kuznetsovi, alongside Orlov's mole (E. orlovi), was formerly considered a population of the long-nosed mole (E. longirostris), but a 2016 study found sufficient genetic divergence to split the populations as distinct species, with the Red River serving as the main geographical barrier leading to E. kuznetsovi's divergence. It is the sister species to E. orlovi.

== Distribution ==
It has been recorded from northeastern Vietnam in Vĩnh Phúc and Cao Bằng provinces, at elevations of 750 to 950 meters asl. A record from Guangxi in southeastern China also likely belongs to this species. It is found east of the Red River.

== Description ==
It is a large-sized mole comparable to E. longirostris and E. orlovi in size. Morphologically, it can be distinguished by its large, club-shaped tail, larger skull size, short molar rows, and wider rostrum.
