= Malaysian mole =

Scientific classification
- Kingdom: Animalia
- Phylum: Chordata
- Class: Mammalia
- Order: Eulipotyphla
- Family: Talpidae
- Genus: Euroscaptor
- Species: E. malayanus

Binomial name
- Euroscaptor malayanus (Chasen, 1940)
- Malaysian mole range

Synonyms
- Talpa klossi malayana (Chasen, 1940); Euroscapter malayanus D.E. Wilso & Mittermeier, 2018; Euroscapter malayana Mammal Diversity Database, 2018

Species of mammal

The Malaysian mole (Euroscaptor malayanus) is a species of mammal in the family Talpidae. It is endemic to the highlands of peninsular Malaysia, making it the southernmost known species of mole.

== Taxonomy ==
This species was formerly classified as a subspecies of Kloss's mole (E. klossi) or (when considered an introduced species) the Himalayan mole (E. micrurus) but a 2008 study found notable morphological and genetic divergence, and split it as a distinct species.

== Distribution ==
This species is known only from the Cameron Highlands, at altitudes from 1,300 to 1,600 meters above sea level. Specimens have been collected from tea plantations and surrounding gardens. This species' association with tea plantations (which goes back to its discovery in 1937 in a forest being converted into a tea plantation), as well as its heavily disjunct range from any other mole species, led to past speculation that it was an E. micrurus population that was accidentally introduced to Malaysia from Darjeeling, where the tea in the Cameron Highlands originated, with some taxonomists even describing it as a subspecies of E. micrurus. However, its heavy morphological and genetic divergence from other mole species, with taxonomic studies finding it to be most closely related to E. klossi, have confirmed its identity as a species native to Malaysia.

== Description ==
The relative size of the upper molars to the greatest length of the skull is the largest in the genus Euroscaptor.

== Conservation ==
The Malaysian mole is likely a relict species that persisted on the Cameron Highlands due to the cooler temperatures optimal for moles. The lowland areas of Malaysia are not suitable habitat due to their largely tropical climate, leading to scarcity of litter deposits and poor soil development. Due to this, the Malaysian mole may be at risk from global warming, as this may lead to a change in the optimal conditions for the species in the highlands.
