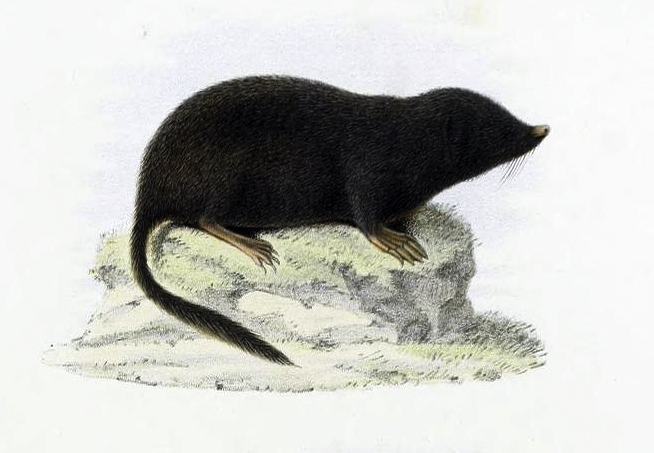

Conservation status
- Least Concern (IUCN 3.1)

Scientific classification
- Kingdom: Animalia
- Phylum: Chordata
- Class: Mammalia
- Order: Eulipotyphla
- Family: Talpidae
- Subfamily: Talpinae
- Tribe: Scaptonychini; Van Valen, 1967
- Genus: Scaptonyx; Milne-Edwards, 1872
- Species: S. fusicauda

Binomial name
- Scaptonyx fusicauda Milne-Edwards, 1872
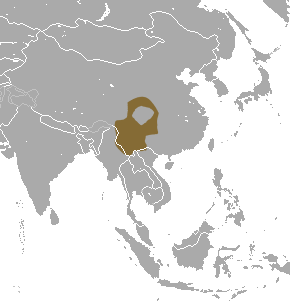
- Long-tailed Mole range

Synonyms
- Scaptonyx affinis Thomas, 1912; Scaptonyx fuscicaudus

= Long-tailed mole =

Species of mammal

The long-tailed mole (Scaptonyx fusicauda) is a species of mole in the family Talpidae. It is found in China, Vietnam and Myanmar.

== Taxonomy ==
The species is the only species in the genus Scaptonyx and the tribe Scaptonychini. At least two subspecies are recognized in China: S. f. affinis occurs in Yunnan and Guizhou, S. f. fusicauda in Sichuan, Shaanxi, and Guizhou.

== Ecology ==
This mole is fully fossorial and spends its life underground. It has been found at relatively high elevations of 2,000-4,100 m and appears to prefer damp, coniferous montane forests.
