= Sergey Ognev =

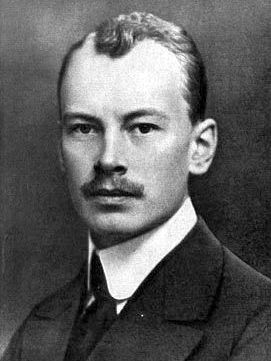
- Born: Серге́й Ива́нович Огнёв; Sergey Ivanovich Ognev; 17 November 1886; Moscow
- Died: 20 December 1951 (aged 65); Moscow
- Education: Moscow University
- Known for: Mammals of Russia and adjacent territories (never completed)
- Scientific career
- Fields: Zoology, especially mammology
- Institutions: Moscow Pedagogical State University
- Author abbrev. (zoology): Ognev

Sergey Ivanovich Ognev (Russian: Серге́й Ива́нович Огнёв) (17 November 1886 in Moscow – 20 December 1951 in Moscow) was a scientist, zoologist and naturalist, remembered for his work on mammalogy. He graduated from Moscow University in 1910, the same year in which he published his first monograph. In 1928, he became a professor at the Moscow State Pedagogical University. He published a variety of textbooks in zoology and ecology. His magnum opus, Mammals of Russia and adjacent territories, was never completed.

He is remembered in the species names of three mammals: Talpa ognevi, Cnephaeus ognevi, and Plecotus ognevi, and the common name of Ognev's Mouse-tailed Dormouse.
