= Himalayan mole =

Conservation status
- Least Concern (IUCN 3.1)

Scientific classification
- Kingdom: Animalia
- Phylum: Chordata
- Class: Mammalia
- Order: Eulipotyphla
- Family: Talpidae
- Genus: Euroscaptor
- Species: E. micrurus

Binomial name
- Euroscaptor micrurus (Hodgson, 1841)
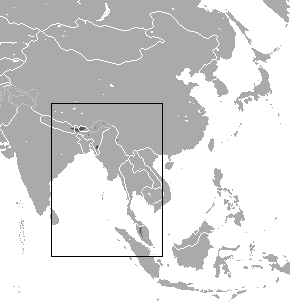
- Himalayan mole range (erroneously includes E. malayanus)

Synonyms
- Euroscaptor micrura

Species of mammal

The Himalayan mole (Euroscaptor micrurus) or short-tailed mole is a species of mammal in the family Talpidae.

== Taxonomy ==
The Malaysian mole (E. malayanus) of peninsular Malaysia was sometimes (erroneously) considered to be a population of the Himalayan mole accidentally introduced to the Cameron Highlands in the soil of tea imported from Darjeeling, due to its highly disjunct range from any other mole species and it mostly being found around tea plantations. However, genetic studies have affirmed its status as a distinct species endemic to Malaysia.

== Behaviour and habitat ==
The Himalayan mole is nocturnal and solitary in nature and lives in a burrow. It is found in Bangladesh, Bhutan, China, India, Malaysia, and Nepal. In Bangladesh, it was found from Lawachara National Park in 1980 and 2011. In March 2017, an individual was found in a tea garden in Sreemangal Upazila, Bangladesh.
