= Long-nosed mole =

Conservation status
- Least Concern (IUCN 3.1)

Scientific classification
- Kingdom: Animalia
- Phylum: Chordata
- Class: Mammalia
- Order: Eulipotyphla
- Family: Talpidae
- Genus: Euroscaptor
- Species: E. longirostris

Binomial name
- Euroscaptor longirostris (Milne-Edwards, 1870)
- Long-nosed mole range

Species of mammal

The long-nosed mole (Euroscaptor longirostris) is a species of mammal in the family Talpidae. It is endemic to China, where it has a widespread distribution.

Orlov's mole (E. orlovi) and Kuznetsov's mole (E. kuznetsovi), both of which range from southern China into northern Vietnam, were formerly considered populations of E. longirostris, but a 2016 described them as distinct species. The Yangtze River is thought to serve as the barrier separating E. longirostris from the two southern species, with E. longirostris only being found north of the Yangtze.
