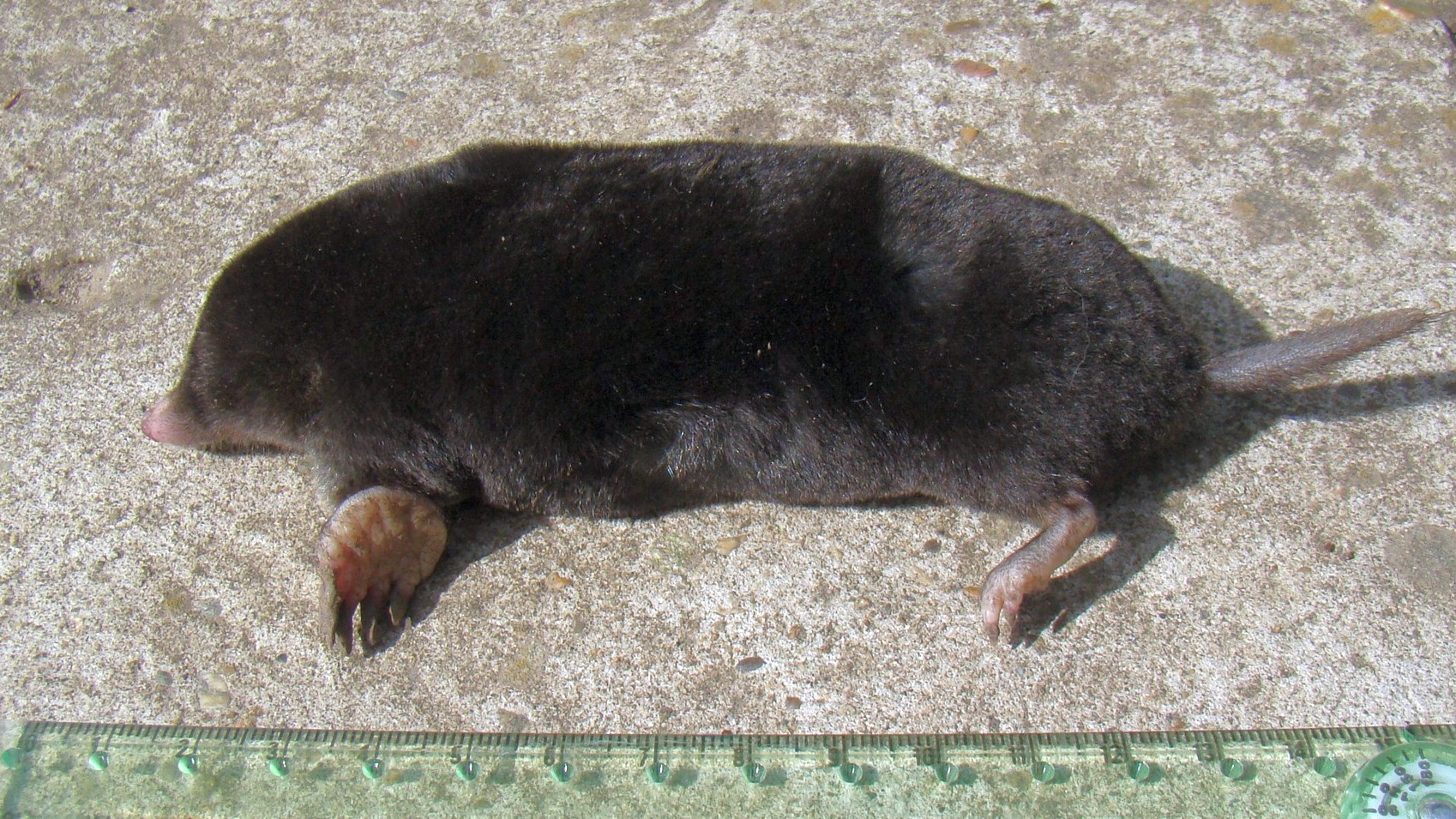

Conservation status
- Least Concern (IUCN 3.1)

Scientific classification
- Kingdom: Animalia
- Phylum: Chordata
- Class: Mammalia
- Order: Eulipotyphla
- Family: Talpidae
- Genus: Talpa
- Species: T. caucasica

Binomial name
- Talpa caucasica Satunin, 1908
- Caucasian mole range

= Caucasian mole =

Species of mammal

The Caucasian mole (Talpa caucasica) is a mammal in the family Talpidae that is endemic to the Caucasus Mountains of Russia and Georgia.

Ognev's mole (T. ognevi) was formerly classified as a subspecies, but is now thought to be a distinct species.
