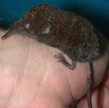

Scientific classification
- Kingdom: Animalia
- Phylum: Chordata
- Class: Mammalia
- Order: Eulipotyphla
- Family: Talpidae
- Subfamily: Uropsilinae; Dobson, 1883
- Genus: Uropsilus; Milne-Edwards, 1871

Type species
- Uropsilus soricipes

Species
- See text

= Uropsilus =

Genus of mammals

The shrew moles or shrew-like moles (Uropsilus) are shrew-like members of the mole family of mammals endemic to the forested, high-alpine region bordering China, Myanmar, and Vietnam. They possess a long snout, a long slender tail, external ears, and small forefeet unspecialized for burrowing. Although they are similar to shrews in size, external appearance, and, presumably, ecological habits, they are nevertheless talpids and considered true moles, as they share a full zygomatic arch with all other moles, while this arch is completely absent in shrews.

The genus is the only one of the subfamily Uropsilinae, which is one of the three main subfamilies of Talpidae, the other two being Talpinae, or Old World moles and relatives; and the Scalopinae, or New World moles. Although little is currently known regarding any aspect of their natural history, the Uropsilinae are thought to be the most ancestral group of moles, and as such, very similar to the primitive talpid from which all Talpidae have evolved. Uropsilus is thought to be a relict genus; despite the small distribution of the modern-day species, the subfamily once had a much wider range throughout Eurasia.

== Species ==
The genus contains the following species:

- U. aequodonenia: Equivalent-teeth shrew mole
- U. andersoni Anderson's shrew mole
- U. atronates: Black-backed shrew mole
- U. dabieshanensis: Dabie Mountains shrew mole
- U. fansipanensis: Fansipan shrew mole - Lao Cai Province, Vietnam
- U. gracilis: Gracile shrew mole
- U. huanggangensis: Huangang shrew mole - China
- U. investigator: Inquisitive shrew mole
- U. nivatus: Snow Mountain shrew mole
- U. soricipes: Chinese shrew mole

Although each species' official English common name still calls them "shrew moles", Uropsilus today are referred to as "shrew-like moles" to distinguish them from other shrew moles, Neurotrichus gibbsii of North America and the Urotrichini, or Japanese shrew moles, both of which are morphologically quite different from Uropsilus and are grouped with the Old World moles and relatives. As a result, the term "shrew-like moles" has been used to refer to Uropsilus, although specific species are still called "shrew moles".
