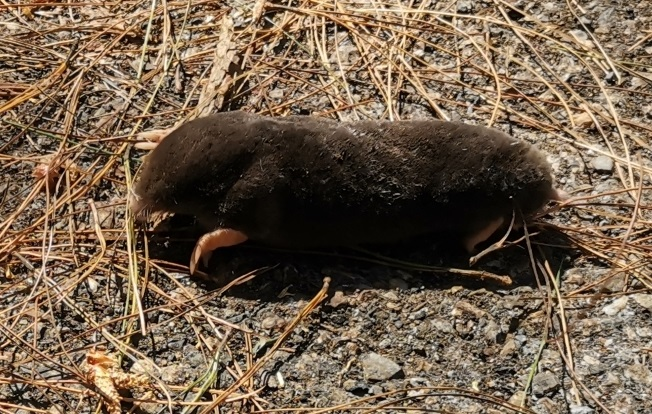

Conservation status
- Least Concern (IUCN 3.1)

Scientific classification
- Kingdom: Animalia
- Phylum: Chordata
- Class: Mammalia
- Order: Eulipotyphla
- Family: Talpidae
- Genus: Euroscaptor
- Species: E. klossi

Binomial name
- Euroscaptor klossi (Thomas, 1929)
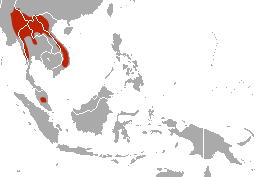
- Kloss's mole range (includes Malaysian mole)

= Kloss's mole =

Species of mammal

Kloss's mole (Euroscaptor klossi) is a species of mammal in the family Talpidae. It is found in Laos and Thailand. It was named after zoologist C. Boden Kloss.

The Malaysian mole (E. malayanus) was formerly considered a subspecies, but a 2008 study supported it being a distinct species.
