= Ognev's mole =

Conservation status
- Least Concern (IUCN 3.1)

Scientific classification
- Kingdom: Animalia
- Phylum: Chordata
- Class: Mammalia
- Order: Eulipotyphla
- Family: Talpidae
- Genus: Talpa
- Species: T. ognevi

Binomial name
- Talpa ognevi Stroganov 1944
- Ognev's mole distribution

Synonyms
- Talpa caucasica ognevi

Species of mammal

Ognev's mole (Talpa ognevi) is a species of mammal in the family Talpidae. It occurs in the southeastern coastal area of the Black Sea from northeastern Turkey to Georgia. It inhabits different habitats associated with moist soils in lowland areas. Little information is available about its life history.

Externally, Ognev's mole resembles the Caucasian mole (T. caucasica), which occurs further north, but is larger and has more robust teeth. It was scientifically named in 1944, but for a time it was considered a subspecies of T. caucasica. However, genetic analysis found major differences, and in 2018 Ognev's mole was recognized as an independent species. No data has yet been collected on the status of the population.

== Taxonomy ==
Ognev's mole is a species of the genus Talpa, which contains Eurasian moles. The genus includes around a dozen other members, including the European mole (Talpa europaea) as its most famous representative. The Eurasian moles belong to the tribe of true moles (Talpini) and the mole family (Talpidae). The true moles in turn include the mostly burrowing forms of the moles, while other members of the family only partially live underground, move above ground or have a semi-aquatic way of life.

=== Description ===
The first scientific description of Ognev's mole was made in 1944 by Sergei Uljanovich Stroganov under the name Talpa romana ognevi and thus as a subspecies of the Roman mole (T. romana). The comparatively larger size of the animals and their robust tooth structure compared to the Caucasian mole, which occurs further north, was primarily what motivated Stroganov to incorporate the new species into the Roman mole. As a type locality, he gave Bakuriani in the region around Borjomi in southern Georgia. The holotype is formed by an adult male animal originating from there. In addition, Stroganov examined seven other individuals, some of which had been found in the vicinity of Kutaisi. With the specific epithet, Stroganow honored the Soviet zoologist Sergey Ivanovich Ognev.

In 1989, Ognev's mole was designated as one of three subspecies of the Caucasian mole by Vladimir Sokolov. The distinction was based on size, as the body shape of Ognev's mole stood out as extremely distinctive from the other Caucasian moles. In line with the moles of the Caucasus region and southern Europe, Ognev's mole also has a caecoidal structure of the sacrum (the opening of the foramen on the fourth sacral vertebra is directed backwards). This is a striking difference from the europaeoidal structure (the opening of the foramen on the fourth sacral vertebra is covered by a bone bridge) of the pelvic area in numerous Central and Western European moles.

Molecular genetic studies since the 2010s have shown a relatively basal position of the Caucasian moles together with the Altai mole (T. altaica) within the Eurasian moles. The separation of this group dates back to the transition from the Miocene to the Pliocene more than 5 million years ago. In 2015, genetic analyses showed a clear separation between the moles of the northern and southern Caucasus region. This was supported by the deep divergence between the two lines, which, according to the results, had been distinct since the end of the Pliocene around 3 to 2.5 million years ago. The authors of the study therefore suspected an independent position of Ognev's mole, but omitted a species position, as no genetic material from individuals from the type locality was available to them. Three years later, in the eighth volume of the standard work Handbook of the Mammals of the World, Ognev's mole was granted species status. This separation from the Caucasian mole is also supported by individual cytogenetic data, since the largest chromosome in Ognev's mole has two arms, whereas the Caucasian mole has an acrocentric structure.

== Distribution and habitat ==
The distribution of Ognev's mole includes the southeastern coastal areas of the Black Sea. It occurs from the Artvin province in northeastern Turkey to the neighboring areas of Georgia to the north, where the habitat extends inland to the upper reaches of the Kura River. The northern limit of the distribution has not been adequately delineated. The animals prefer lowlands and river valleys near the coast. Higher areas are mostly inhabited by the sympatric Levant mole (T. levantis transcaucasica). Ognev's mole can be found in gardens, fields, and wooded landscapes with moist soils.

== Characteristics ==
=== Anatomy ===
Ognev's mole reaches a head-trunk length of 13.4 to 14.2 cm, a tail length of 2.0 to 2.6 cm and a weight of 62 to 91 g. The sexual dimorphism is only slightly pronounced, males are on average 5% heavier than females. With the specified dimensions, Ognev's mole is larger than the closely related Caucasian mole. Outwardly, both types are similar. Like all moles, they are characterized by a cylindrical and robust body, a short neck and shovel-like front feet. The coat color has a blackish gray to black hue. Occasionally, yellowish spots are formed on the muzzle, throat and chest. Similar to the Caucasian mole, but unlike the European mole (Talpa europaea), the eyes are covered with a translucent skin. The rear foot has a length of 1.8 to 2.0 cm.

=== Features of skull and teeth ===
The length of the skull varies between 33.6 and 35.0 mm, the width on the zygomatic arch is 12.1 to 13.7 mm, and the cranium is 15.9 to 17.2 mm. It has a robust rostrum that is between 9.0 and 10.1 mm wide. The dentition has 44 teeth with the following tooth formula: $\frac{3.1.4.3}{3.1.4.3}$.

Compared to the Caucasian mole, the upper molars are very strong. The upper row of teeth extends over 14.7 to 15.8 mm in length, of which the molars take up 6.0 to 7.4 mm. In proportion, the upper row of teeth takes up around 40% of the length of the skull.

=== Genetic characteristics ===
The diploid number is 2n = 38. It consists of 8 metacentric, 3 submetacentric, 2 subtelocentric and 5 teloacrocentric pairs of chromosomes. The largest chromosome has two arms. The X chromosome is (sub) metacentric, the Y chromosome is speckled.

== Life history ==
There is little information about the life history of Ognev's mole. Presumably it resembles that of the Caucasian mole.

== Threats and conservation ==
Ognev's mole has been assessed by the IUCN as "Least Concern". Information on the status of populations and protective measures is not available.

== Literature ==
- Boris Kryštufek and Masaharu Motokawa (2018). "Talpidae (Moles, Desmans, Star-nosed Moles and Shrew Moles)". In Don E. Wilson and Russell A. Mittermeier (eds.). Insectivores, Sloths, Colugos. Handbook of the Mammals of the World. Vol. 8. Barcelona: Lynx Edicions. pp. 552–620. ISBN 978-84-16728-08-4.
