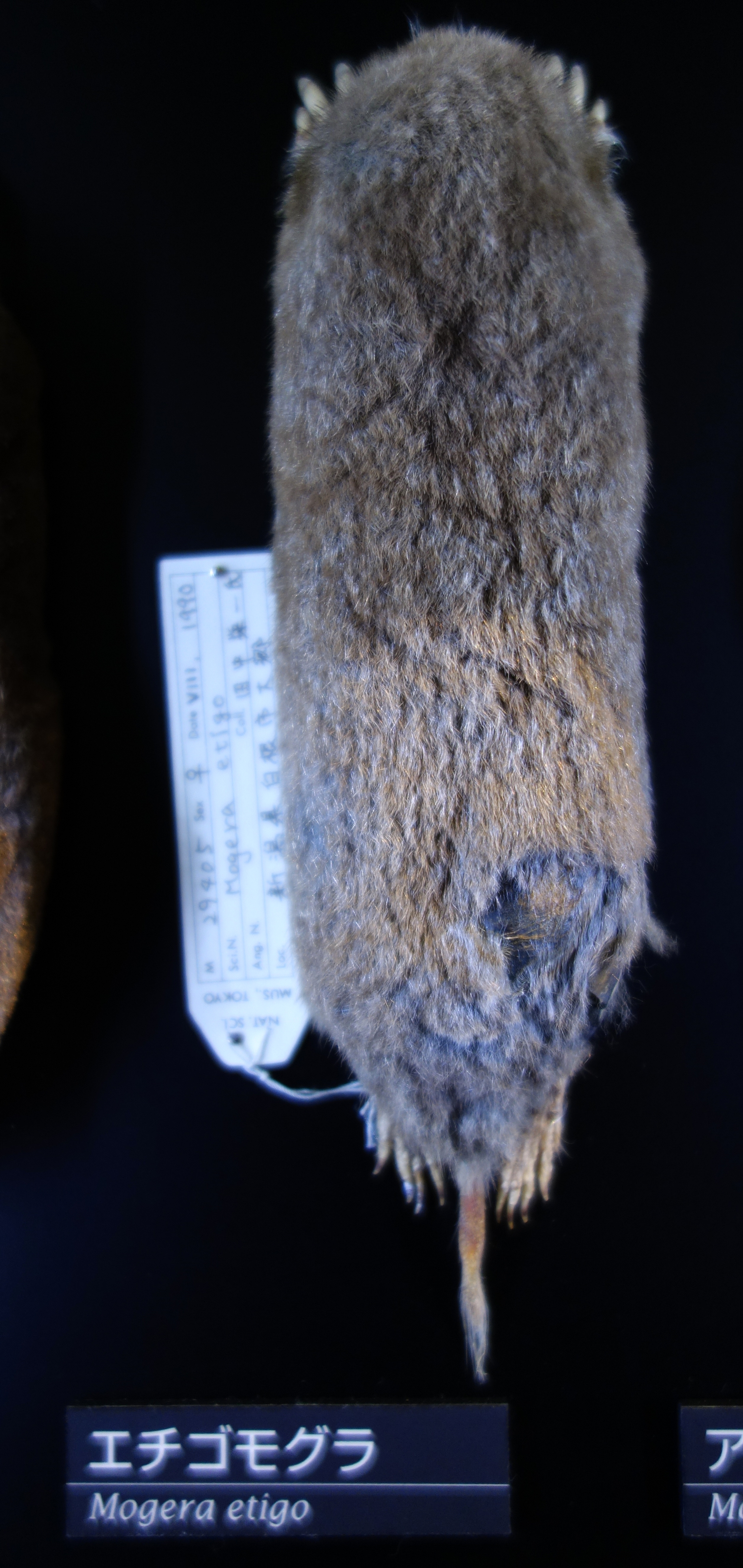

Conservation status
- Endangered (IUCN 3.1)

Scientific classification
- Kingdom: Animalia
- Phylum: Chordata
- Class: Mammalia
- Order: Eulipotyphla
- Family: Talpidae
- Genus: Mogera
- Species: M. etigo

Binomial name
- Mogera etigo Yoshiyuki & Imaizumi, 1991
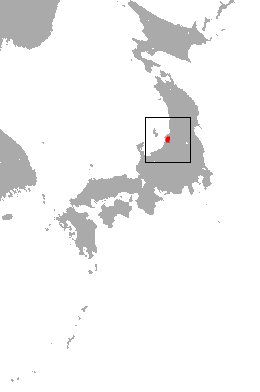
- Echigo Mole range

= Echigo mole =

Species of mammal

The Echigo mole (Mogera etigo) is an endangered species of mammal in the family Talpidae. It is endemic to Japan, being found only on the Echigo plain, Niigata prefecture.
