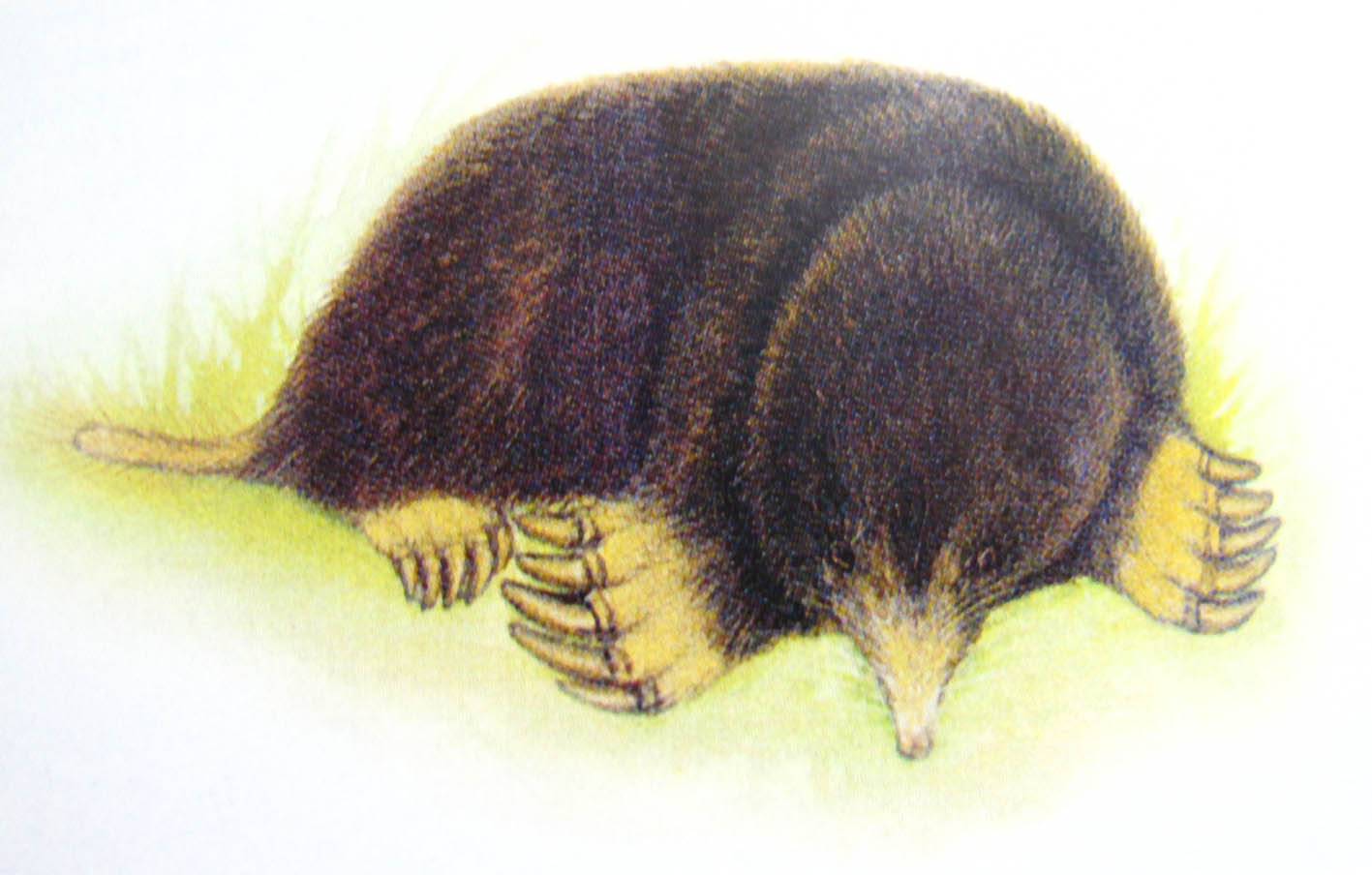

Conservation status
- Least Concern (IUCN 3.1)

Scientific classification
- Kingdom: Animalia
- Phylum: Chordata
- Class: Mammalia
- Order: Eulipotyphla
- Family: Talpidae
- Genus: Euroscaptor
- Species: E. grandis

Binomial name
- Euroscaptor grandis Miller, 1940
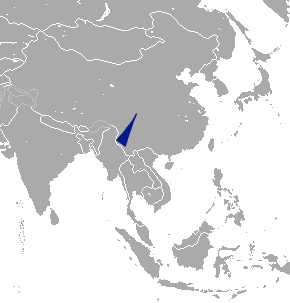
- Greater Chinese Mole range

= Greater Chinese mole =

Species of mammal

The greater Chinese mole (Euroscaptor grandis) is a species of mammal in the family Talpidae. It is found in China and potentially Myanmar.
