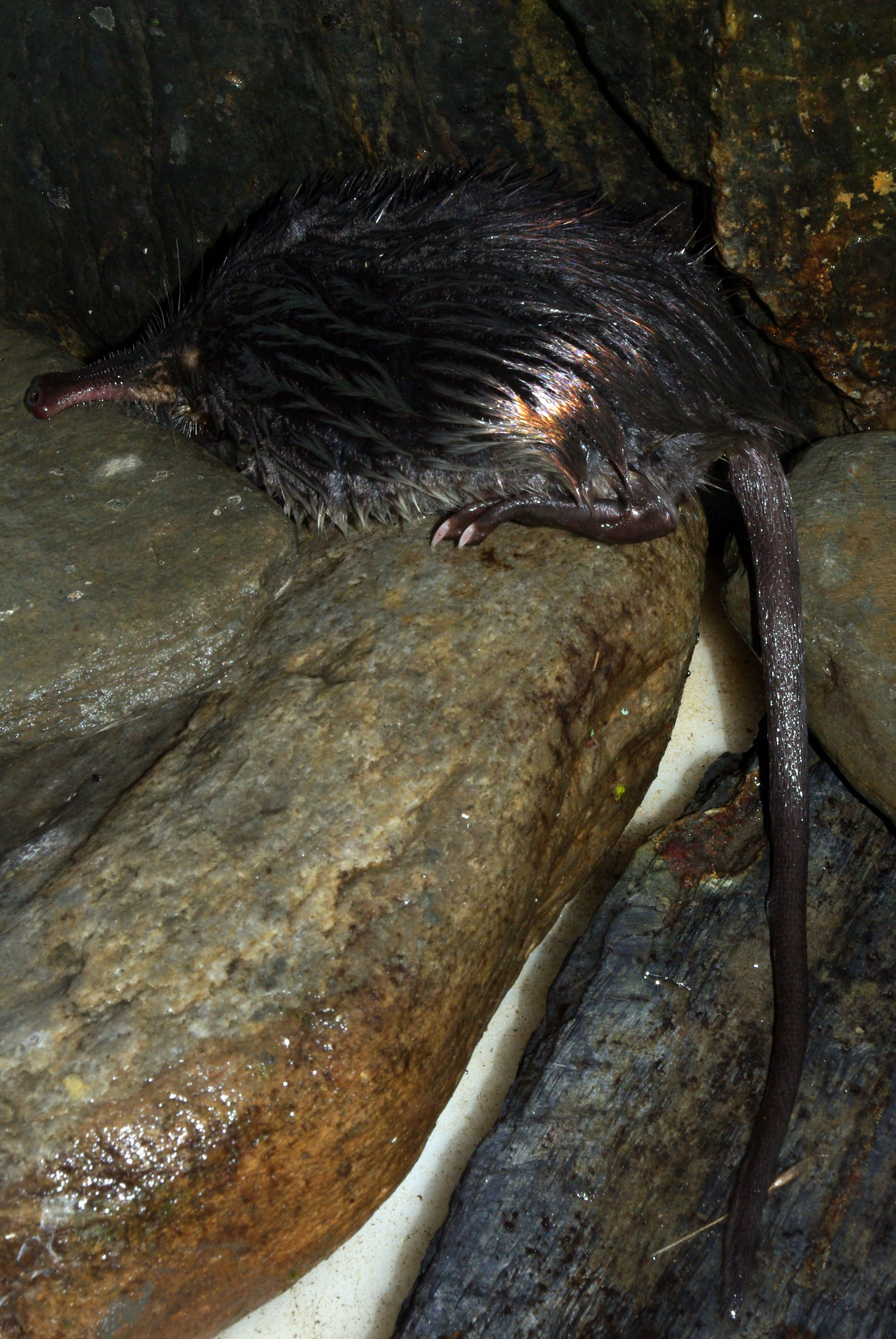
- Pyrenean desman (Galemys pyrenaicus)

Scientific classification
- Kingdom: Animalia
- Phylum: Chordata
- Class: Mammalia
- Order: Eulipotyphla
- Family: Talpidae
- Tribe: Desmanini
- Genus: Galemys; Kaup, 1829

Type species
- Mygale pyrenaica Geoffroy, 1811

Species
- Galemys pyrenaicus; †Galemys kormosi; †Galemys semseyi; †Galemys sulimskii

= Galemys =

Galemys Temporal range: Early Pliocene - Recent

Genus of mammals

Galemys is a genus of mole containing the living Pyrenean desman (Galemys pyrenaicus) and several fossil species.

Many of these extinct species were far more widespread than the living species; for example, the Early Pleistocene Galemys kormosi was found in freshwater habitats throughout much of Europe, including the British Isles. Galemys probably evolved in the Early Pliocene from a species in the extinct genus Archaeodesmana.
