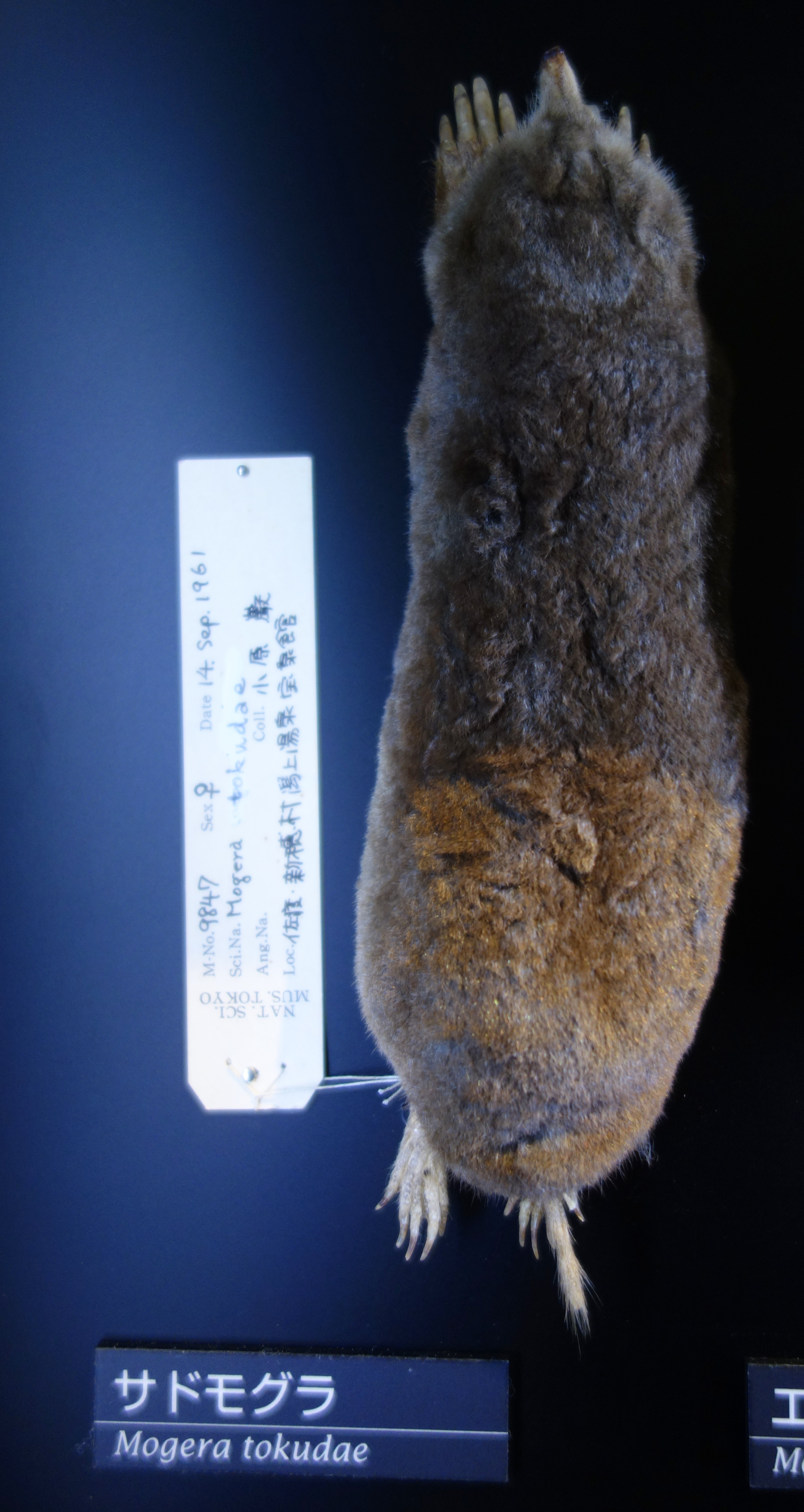

Conservation status
- Near Threatened (IUCN 3.1)

Scientific classification
- Kingdom: Animalia
- Phylum: Chordata
- Class: Mammalia
- Order: Eulipotyphla
- Family: Talpidae
- Genus: Mogera
- Species: M. tokudae

Binomial name
- Mogera tokudae Kuroda, 1940
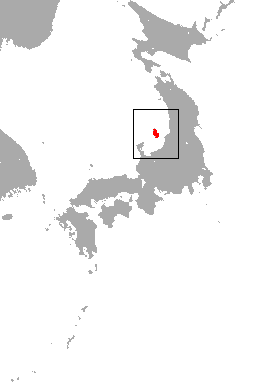
- Sado mole range

= Sado mole =

Species of mammal

The Sado mole or Tokuda's mole (Mogera tokudae) is a species of mammal in the family Talpidae. It is endemic to Sado Island, Japan.
