= Chinese shrew mole =

Conservation status
- Least Concern (IUCN 3.1)

Scientific classification
- Kingdom: Animalia
- Phylum: Chordata
- Class: Mammalia
- Order: Eulipotyphla
- Family: Talpidae
- Genus: Uropsilus
- Species: U. soricipes

Binomial name
- Uropsilus soricipes Milne-Edwards, 1871
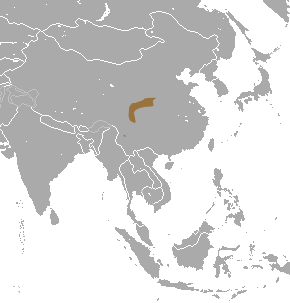
- Chinese shrew mole range

Species of mammal

The Chinese shrew mole (Uropsilus soricipes) is a species of mammal in the family Talpidae. It is endemic to China, Sichuan Province. Its natural habitat is temperate forests.
