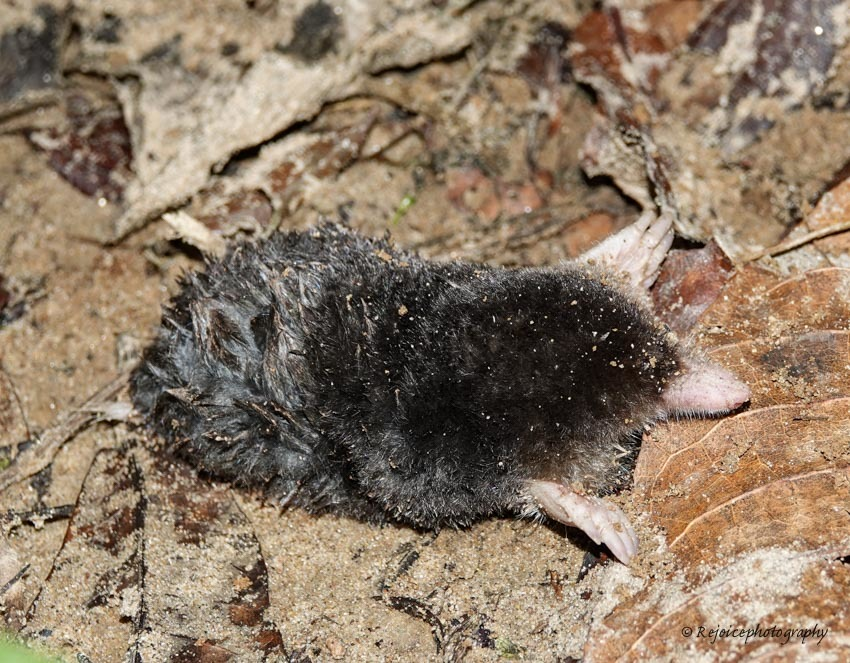

Conservation status
- Least Concern (IUCN 3.1)

Scientific classification
- Kingdom: Animalia
- Phylum: Chordata
- Class: Mammalia
- Order: Eulipotyphla
- Family: Talpidae
- Genus: Parascaptor; Gill, 1875
- Species: P. leucura

Binomial name
- Parascaptor leucura (Blyth, 1850)
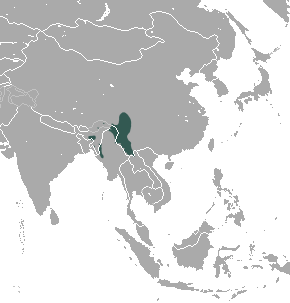
- White-tailed mole range

= White-tailed mole =

Species of mole

The white-tailed mole (Parascaptor leucura) is a species of mammal in the family Talpidae. It is found in Bangladesh, China, India, and Myanmar. This species are endemic to East Asia and exhibit limited distributions. It is the only species in the genus Parascaptor.

It has a looser articulation between the malleus and the ectotympanic bone and a reduced or absent orbicular apophysis. Parascaptor has a hypertrophied malleus, a feature shared with Scaptochirus but not found in any other talpid genera. It lacks a tensor tympani muscle, possess complete bullae, and has extensions of the middle ear cavity that pneumatize the surrounding basicranial bones.
