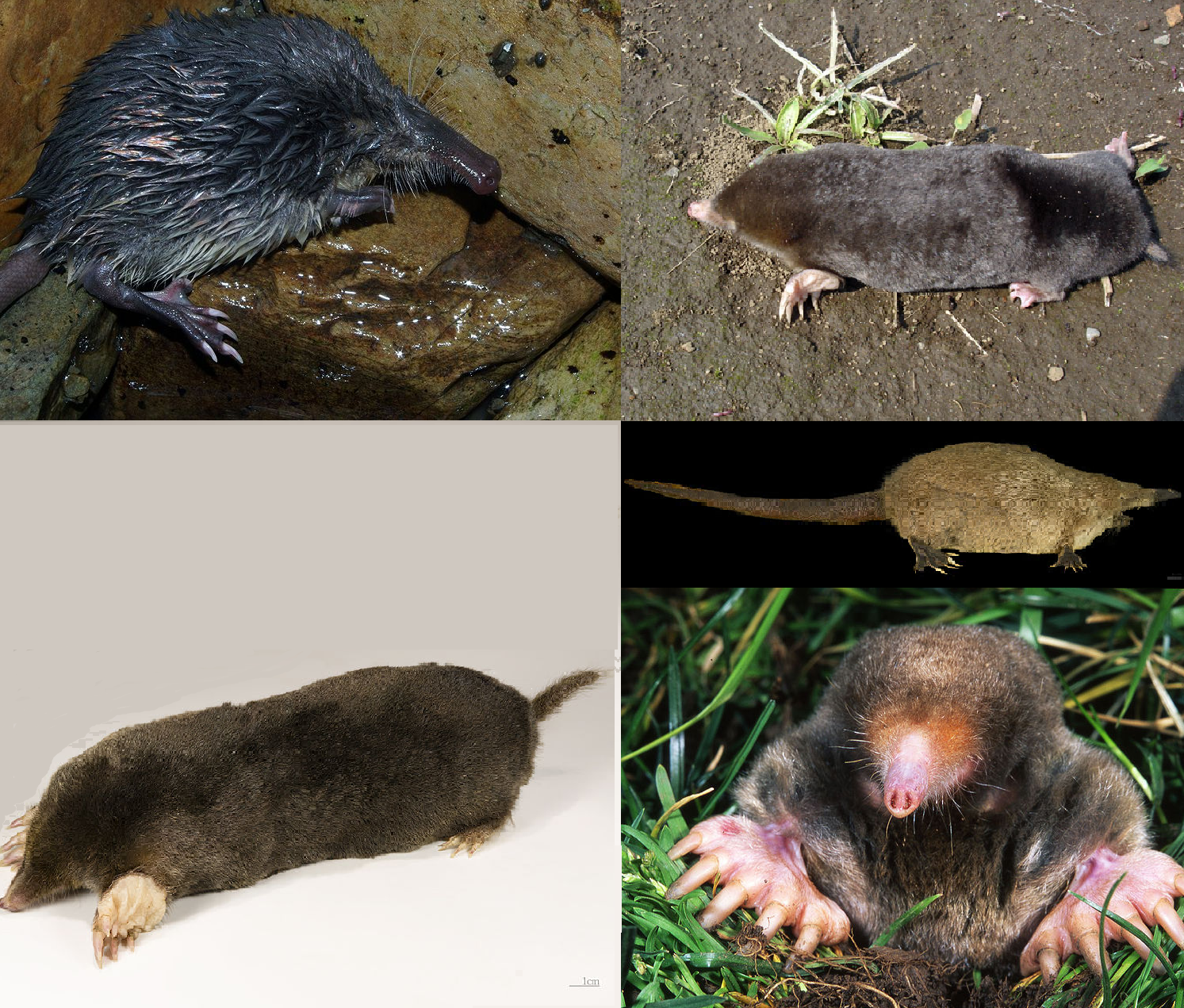
- Left column: Top: Pyrenean desman; Bottom: European mole; Right column: Top: Small Japanese mole; Middle: Russian desman; Bottom: Eastern mole

Scientific classification
- Kingdom: Animalia
- Phylum: Chordata
- Class: Mammalia
- Order: Eulipotyphla
- Superfamily: Talpoidea
- Family: Talpidae; G. Fischer, 1814

Type genus
- Talpa Linnaeus, 1758

Subfamilies
- Talpinae; Scalopinae; Uropsilinae
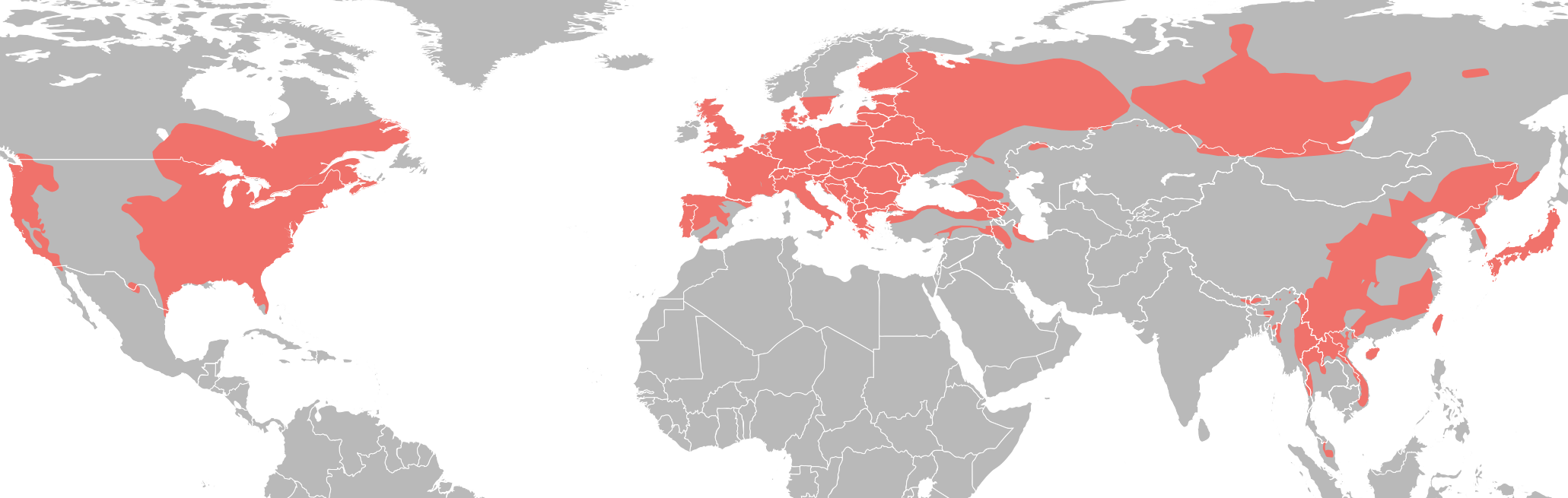
- Talpidae distribution

= Talpidae =

Talpidae Temporal range: Late Eocene–Recent

Family of small insectivorous mammals

The family Talpidae (/ˈtælpɪdiː/) includes the true moles (as well as the shrew moles and desmans), who are small insectivorous mammals of the order Eulipotyphla. Talpids are all digging animals to various degrees: moles are completely subterranean animals; shrew moles and shrew-like moles somewhat less so; and desmans, while basically aquatic, excavate dry sleeping chambers; whilst the quite unique star-nosed mole is equally adept in the water and underground. Talpids are found across the Northern Hemisphere of Eurasia and North America (although none are found in Ireland nor in the Americas south of northern Mexico), and range as far south as the montane regions of tropical Southeast Asia.

The first talpids evolved from shrew-like animals which adapted to digging late in the Eocene in Europe. Eotalpa anglica is the oldest known mole, discovered in the Late Eocene deposits of Hampshire Basin, UK. The most primitive living talpids are believed to be the shrew-like moles, with other species having adapted further into the subterranean, and, in some cases, aquatic lifestyles.

== Characteristics ==
Talpids are small, dark-furred animals with cylindrical bodies and hairless, tubular snouts. They range in size from the tiny shrew moles of North America, as small as 10 cm in length and weighing under 12 grams, to the Russian desman, with a body length of 18–22 cm, and a weight of about 550 grams. The fur varies between species, but is always dense and short; desmans have waterproof undercoats and oily guard hairs, while the subterranean moles have short, velvety fur lacking any guard hairs. The forelimbs of moles are highly adapted for digging, with powerful claws, and the paws turned permanently outwards to aid in shovelling dirt away from the front of the body. By contrast, desmans have webbed paws with a fringe of stiff fur to aid in swimming. Moles generally have short tails, but those of desmans are elongated and flattened.

All species have small eyes and poor eyesight, but only a few are truly blind. The external ears are very small or absent. Talpids rely primarily on their sense of touch, having sensory vibrissae on their faces, legs, and tails. Their flexible snouts are particularly sensitive. Desmans are able to close both their nostrils and ears while diving. Unusually, the penis of talpids points backwards, and they have no scrotum.

Females have six or eight teats. Both sexes have claws on all five fingers and on all five toes. The paw has an additional bone called the os falciforme. In burrowing moles, the clavicle and the humeral head are connected. The tibia and the fibula are partially fused in all talpids. The pubis does not connect the two halves of the pelvic girdle. The skull is long, narrow, and rather flattened.

Talpids are generally insectivorous. Moles eat earthworms, insect larvae, and occasionally slugs, while desmans eat aquatic invertebrates such as shrimps, insect larvae, and snails. Talpids have relatively unspecialized teeth, with the dental formula:

Dentition
2-3.1.3-4.3
1-3.0-1.3-4.3

=== Sex characteristics ===
Many species of talpid moles exhibit peniform clitorises that are tunneled by the urethra and are found to have erectile tissue, most notably species from the Talpa genus found in Europe. Unique to this clade are the presence of ovotestes, wherein the female ovary also is mostly made up of sterile testicular tissue that secretes testosterone with only a small portion of the gonad containing ovarian tissue. Genetic studies have revealed that females of these species have an XX genotype and do not have any translocated Y-linked genes. Detailed developmental studies of Talpa occidentalis have revealed that the female gonads develop in a "testis-like pattern". DMRT1, a gene that regulates development of Sertoli cells, was found to be expressed in female germ cells before meiosis, however no Sertoli cells were present in the fully-developed ovotestes. Additionally, the female germ cells only enter meiosis postnatally, a phenomenon that has not been found in any other eutherian mammal. Phylogenetic analyses have suggested that, like in lemuroids, this trait must have evolved in a common ancestor of the clade, and has been "turned off and on" in different talpid lineages.

Female European moles are highly territorial and will not allow males in to their territory outside of breeding season, the probable cause of this behavior being the high levels of testosterone secreted by the female ovotestes. During the non-breeding season, their vaginal opening is covered by skin, akin to the condition seen in mouse and dwarf lemurs.

=== Behavior ===
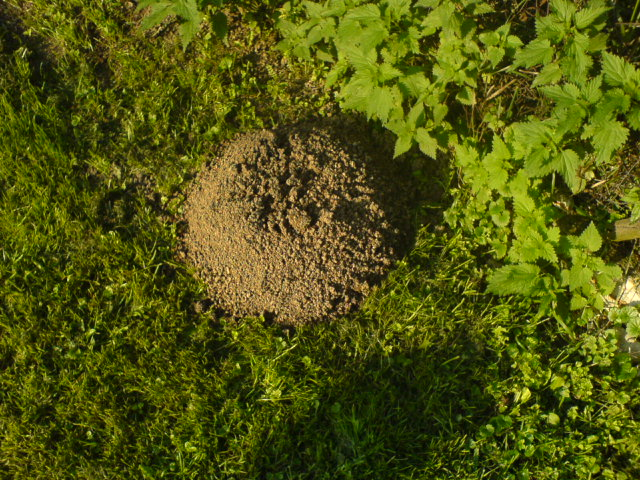
Molehill

Desmans and shrew moles are primarily nocturnal, but moles are active day and night, usually travelling above ground only under cover of darkness. Most moles dig permanent burrows, and subsist largely on prey that falls into them. The shrew moles dig burrows to access deep sleeping chambers, but forage for food on the forest floor by night. Desmans dig burrows in riverbanks for shelter and forage in the water of rivers and lakes. The star-nosed mole is able to make a living much as other moles do, but are also very capable aquatic creatures, where they are able to smell underwater by using their unique proboscis to hold out a bubble of air into the water.

Talpids appear to be generally quite antisocial animals, and although at least one species, the star-nosed mole, will share burrows, talpids are known to engage in much territorial behavior, including extraordinarily fast battles.

== Classification ==
The family is divided into three subfamilies, 19 genera and 59 species.

- Family Talpidae
  - Subfamily Uropsilinae - Asian shrew-like moles (Chinese shrew moles)
    - Genus Uropsilus - eight species in China, Bhutan, and Myanmar
      - Equivalent-teeth shrew mole, U. aequodonenia
      - Anderson's shrew mole, U. andersoni
      - Black-backed shrew mole, U. atronates
      - Dabie Mountains shrew mole, U. dabieshanensis
      - Gracile shrew mole, U. gracilis
      - Inquisitive shrew mole, U. investigator
      - Snow Mountain shrew mole, U. nivatus
      - Chinese shrew mole, U. soricipes
  - Subfamily Scalopinae - New World moles
    - Tribe Condylurini - condylurine moles
      - Genus Condylura - one species in eastern North America
        - Star-nosed mole, C. cristata
    - Tribe Scalopini - scalopine moles
      - Genus Alpiscaptulus - one species in China
        - Medog mole, A. medogensis
      - Genus Parascalops - one species in northeastern North America
        - Hairy-tailed mole, P. breweri
      - Genus Scalopus - one species in eastern North America
        - Eastern mole, S. aquaticus
      - Genus Scapanulus - one species in China
        - Gansu mole, S. oweni
      - Genus Scapanus - five species in western North America
        - Mexican mole, S. anthonyi
        - Northern broad-footed mole, S. latimanus
        - Southern broad-footed mole, S. occultus
        - Coast mole, S. orarius
        - Townsend's mole, S. townsendii
  - Subfamily Talpinae - Old World moles, desmans, and shrew moles
    - Tribe Talpini - talpine moles
      - Genus Euroscaptor - ten species in East, South, and Southeast Asia
        - Greater Chinese mole, E. grandis
        - Kloss's mole, E. klossi
        - Kuznetsov's mole, E. kuznetsovi
        - Long-nosed mole, E. longirostris
        - Malaysian mole, E. malayanus
        - Himalayan mole, E. micrurus
        - Ngoc Linh mole, E. ngoclinhensis
        - Orlov's mole, E. orlovi
        - Small-toothed mole, E. parvidens
        - Vietnamese mole, E. subanura
      - Genus Mogera - nine species from East Asia
        - Echigo mole, M. etigo
        - Small Japanese mole, M. imaizumii
        - Insular mole, M. insularis
        - Kano's mole, M. kanoana
        - La Touche's mole, M. latouchei
        - Ussuri mole, M. robusta
        - Sado mole, M. tokudae
        - Senkaku mole, M. uchidai
        - Japanese mole, M. wogura
      - Genus Oreoscaptor - one species in Japan
        - Japanese mountain mole, O. mizura
      - Genus Parascaptor - one species in southern Asia
        - White-tailed mole, P. leucura
      - Genus Scaptochirus - China
        - Short-faced mole, S. moschatus
      - Genus Talpa - thirteen species, Europe and western Asia
        - Altai mole, T. altaica
        - Aquitanian mole, T. aquitania
        - Blind mole, T. caeca
        - Caucasian mole, T. caucasica
        - Père David's mole, T. davidiana
        - European mole, T. europaea
        - Levant mole, T. levantis
        - Martino's mole, T. martinorum
        - Spanish mole, T. occidentalis
        - Ognev's mole, T. ognevi
        - Roman mole, T. romana
        - Balkan mole, T. stankovici
        - Talysch mole, T. talyschensis
    - Tribe Scaptonychini
      - Genus Scaptonyx - one species in China and Myanmar
        - Long-tailed mole, S. fusicauda
    - Tribe Desmanini - desmans
      - Genus Desmana
        - Russian desman, D. moschata
      - Genus Galemys
        - Pyrenean desman, G. pyrenaicus
    - Tribe Urotrichini - Japanese shrew moles
      - Genus Dymecodon
        - True's shrew mole, D. pilirostris
      - Genus Urotrichus
        - Japanese shrew mole, U. talpoides
    - Tribe Neurotrichini - New World shrew moles
      - Genus Neurotrichus - Pacific northwest US, southwest British Columbia
        - American shrew mole, N. gibbsii

Some studies suggest that this classification into three subfamilies is not entirely accurate, finding Uropsilinae to be the most basal member, then Desmanini, then a clade comprising Neurotrichini, Scaptonychini, and Urotrichini, then the Condylurini, and then Talpini and Scalopini being sister groups to one another. The current classification into 3 subfamilies renders both Talpinae and Scalopinae paraphyletic.

=== Unrelated mammals built like moles ===
The following mammals have burrowing habits, and have by virtue of convergent evolution many derived characters in common with true moles from the family Talpidae but are nonetheless unrelated.

- Marsupial moles (2 species): Notoryctes typhlops, and N. caurinus.
- Golden moles (21 species), belonging to the Afrotheria.

== Relationship with humans ==
All species in the family Talpidae are classed as "prohibited new organisms" under New Zealand's Hazardous Substances and New Organisms Act 1996, preventing them from being imported into the country.

== See also ==
- Mouldwarp
