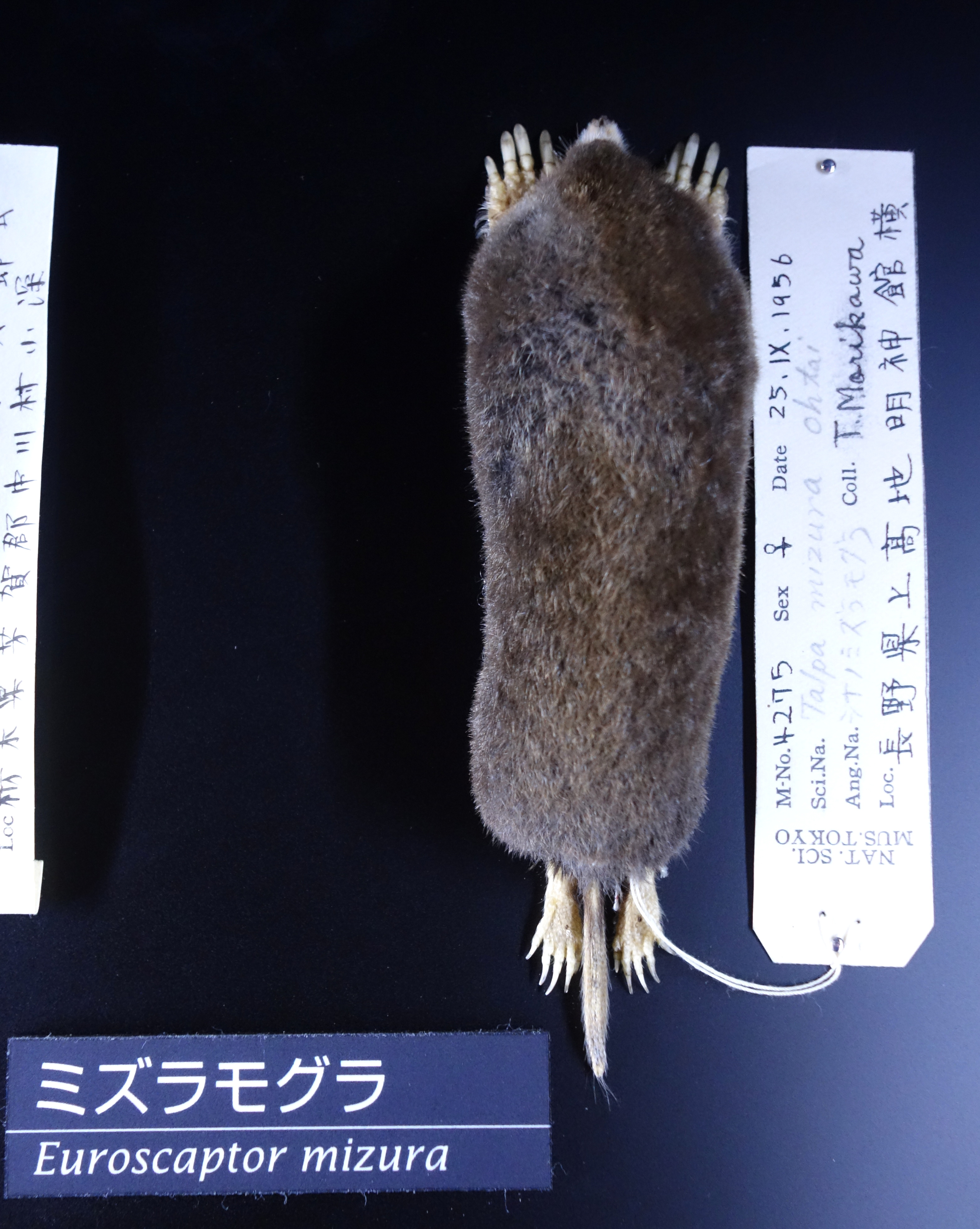

Conservation status
- Least Concern (IUCN 3.1)

Scientific classification
- Kingdom: Animalia
- Phylum: Chordata
- Class: Mammalia
- Order: Eulipotyphla
- Family: Talpidae
- Tribe: Talpini
- Genus: Oreoscaptor; Kawada, 2016
- Species: O. mizura

Binomial name
- Oreoscaptor mizura (Günther, 1880)
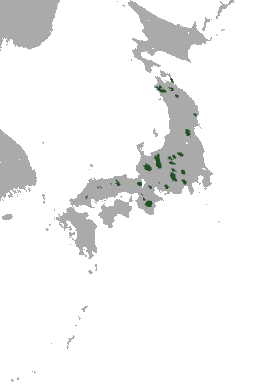
- Japanese Mountain Mole range

Synonyms
- Euroscaptor mizura

= Japanese mountain mole =

Species of mammal

The Japanese mountain mole (Oreoscaptor mizura) is a species of Old World mole in the family Talpidae. It is endemic to Japan. It is the only member of the monotypic genus Oreoscaptor. Its natural habitats are temperate forests and temperate grassland.

== Taxonomy ==
Although the Japanese mountain mole was formerly classified in the genus Euroscaptor, a study published by the American Society of Mammalogists found that they did not truly belong to the genus because of earlier evolutionary divergence from other Euroscaptor species. In 2016, the species was reclassified into the new genus Oreoscaptor.

== Morphology ==
The taxonomic position of the species was reassessed in 2016 based on its external and skeletal morphologies. It was found that the muzzle of this species showed a unique groove on the ventral side, separating it from the rest of the moles in the family.
