= Gracile shrew mole =

Conservation status
- Least Concern (IUCN 3.1)

Scientific classification
- Kingdom: Animalia
- Phylum: Chordata
- Class: Mammalia
- Order: Eulipotyphla
- Family: Talpidae
- Genus: Uropsilus
- Species: U. gracilis

Binomial name
- Uropsilus gracilis (Thomas, 1911)
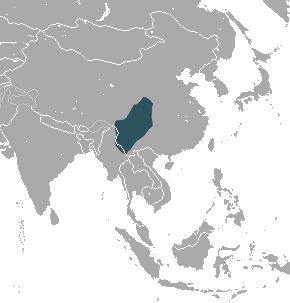
- Gracile shrew mole range (includes U. atronates and U. nivatus range)

Synonyms
- Uropsilus atronates Allen, 1923; Uropsilus nivatus Allen, 1923

Species of mammal

The gracile shrew mole (Uropsilus gracilis) is a species of mammal in the family Talpidae. It is endemic to China; populations known from Myanmar likely represent other species (see below).

The black-backed shrew mole (U. atronates) and the Snow Mountain shrew mole (U. nivatus) were formerly considered subspecies, but a 2018 phylogenetic study split them as distinct species. The study found U. gracilis to be the sister species to an undescribed species of Uropsilus, with the clade comprising both being sister to U. atronates. U. atronates and the clade containing U. gracilis likely diverged during the early-mid Pleistocene.
