= Inquisitive shrew mole =

Conservation status
- Least Concern (IUCN 3.1)

Scientific classification
- Kingdom: Animalia
- Phylum: Chordata
- Class: Mammalia
- Order: Eulipotyphla
- Family: Talpidae
- Genus: Uropsilus
- Species: U. investigator

Binomial name
- Uropsilus investigator (Thomas, 1922)
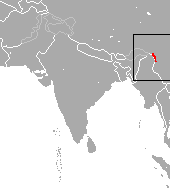
- Inquisitive shrew mole range

Species of mammal

The inquisitive shrew mole (Uropsilus investigator) is a species of mammal in the family Talpidae. It is only known from Yunnan province of China, although its range is thought to extend over the border into Myanmar.

A 2018 phylogenetic study found U. investigator to be the sister lineage to all other species in the genus Uropsilus, having diverged from the rest of the genus during the late Miocene.
