= Anderson's shrew mole =

Conservation status
- Data Deficient (IUCN 3.1)

Scientific classification
- Kingdom: Animalia
- Phylum: Chordata
- Class: Mammalia
- Order: Eulipotyphla
- Family: Talpidae
- Genus: Uropsilus
- Species: U. andersoni

Binomial name
- Uropsilus andersoni (Thomas, 1911)
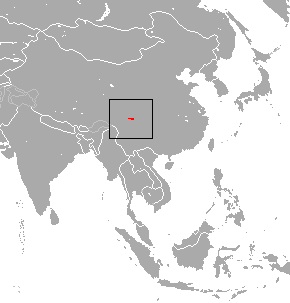
- Anderson's shrew mole range

Species of mammal

The Anderson's shrew mole (Uropsilus andersoni) is a species of mammal in the family Talpidae. It is endemic to China. Its species name "andersoni" was chosen to honor American scientific collector Malcolm Playfair Anderson.
