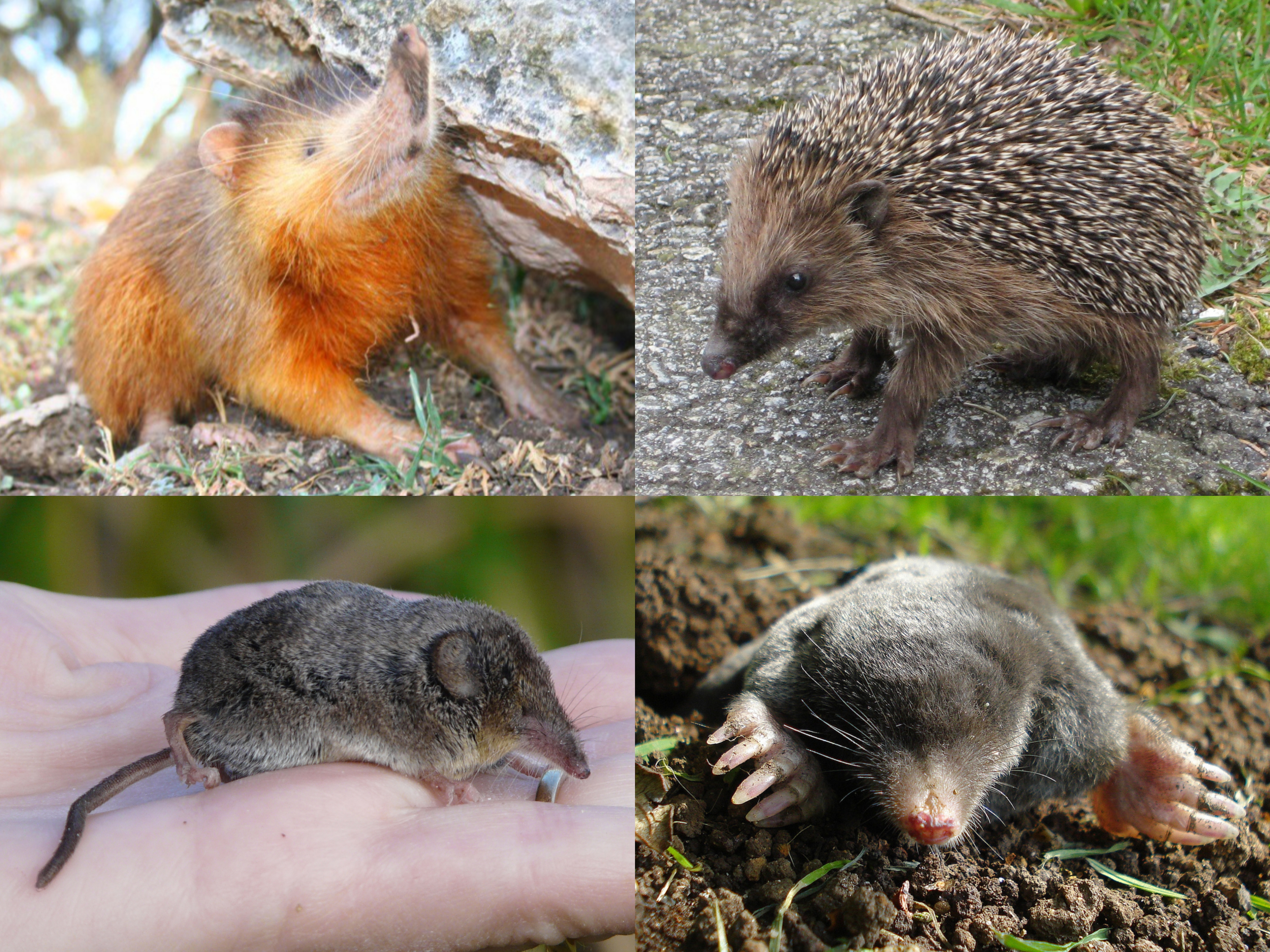
- Clockwise from upper left: a solenodon, hedgehog, (Note: Either a European hedgehog or a northern white-breasted hedgehog) mole and shrew

Scientific classification
- Kingdom: Animalia
- Phylum: Chordata
- Class: Mammalia
- Magnorder: Boreoeutheria
- Superorder: Laurasiatheria
- Order: Eulipotyphla; Waddell et al., 1999

Families
- †Amphilemuridae; †Geolabididae; †Nyctitheriidae; †Plesiosoricidae; Solenodonota Brace et al., 2016; †Nesophontidae; Solenodontidae; Erinaceota van Valen, 1967; Talpidae; Soricidae; Erinaceidae

Synonyms
- Euinsectivora; Insectivora

= Eulipotyphla =

Eulipotyphla Temporal range: Paleocene–Recent

Order of mammals

Eulipotyphla (/juːˌlaɪpəˈtɪflə/, from eu- "true" + Lipotyphla "lacking blind gut"; sometimes called true insectivores) is an order of mammals comprising the families Erinaceidae (hedgehogs and gymnures), Solenodontidae (solenodons), Talpidae (moles, shrew-like moles and desmans), and Soricidae (true shrews).

== Taxonomic history ==
Historically, these animals were grouped with others such as treeshrews, elephant shrews, and colugos, under the broader category Insectivora, comprising all small insect-eating placental mammals. Wilhelm Peters identified two sub-groups of Insectivora, distinguished by the presence or absence of a cecum in the large intestine. In his 1866 Generelle morphologie der organismen, Ernst Haeckel named these groups Menotyphla and Lipotyphla, respectively from μένω ("remain")/λείπω ("lack" or "leave behind") + τυφλὸν literally "blind", as in τυφλὸν ἔντερον ("blind intestine", from which the Latin intestinum caecum derives as a calque).

Since the late 1990s, molecular studies have produced evidence that the Lipotyphla are not a monophyletic group. This led to tenrecs, otter shrews, and golden moles being placed in a new order (Afrosoricida, in the superorder Afrotheria), with the remaining members of Lipotyphla being reclassified as Eulipotyphla.

A 2023 study suggested that the order began to diversify prior to the K-Pg extinction, based on molecular clock estimates.

== Classification ==
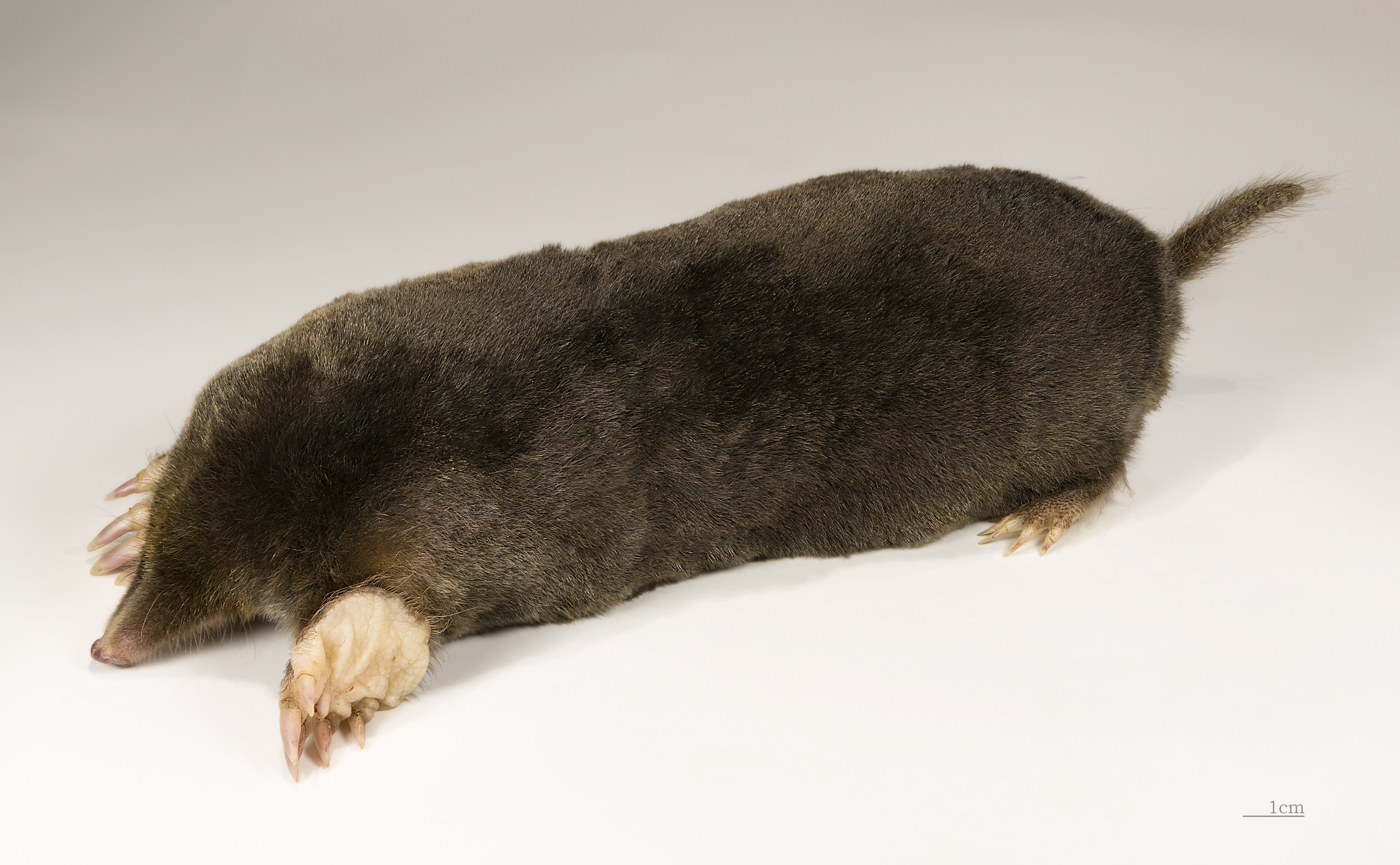
European mole (Talpidae)

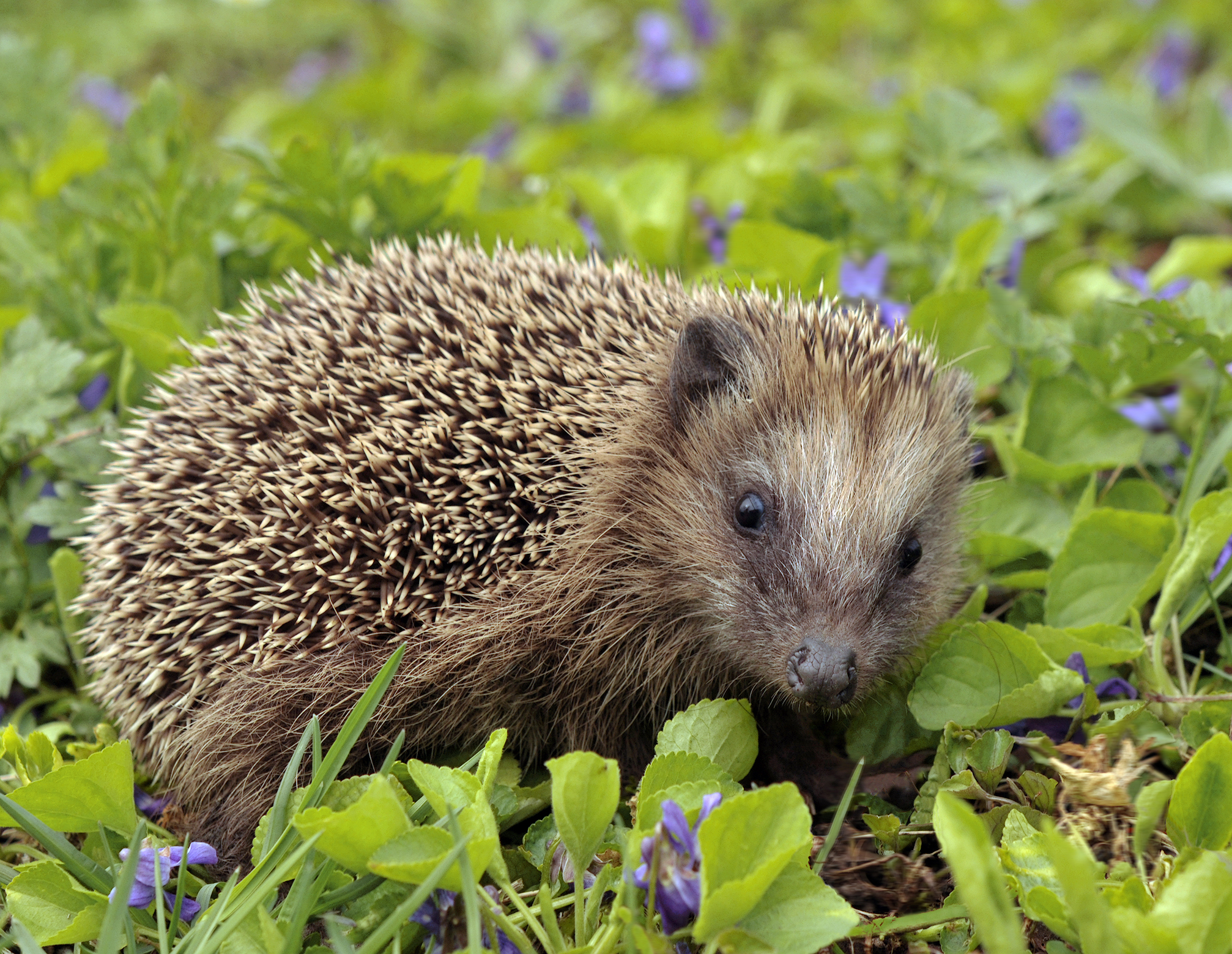
European hedgehog (Erinaceidae)

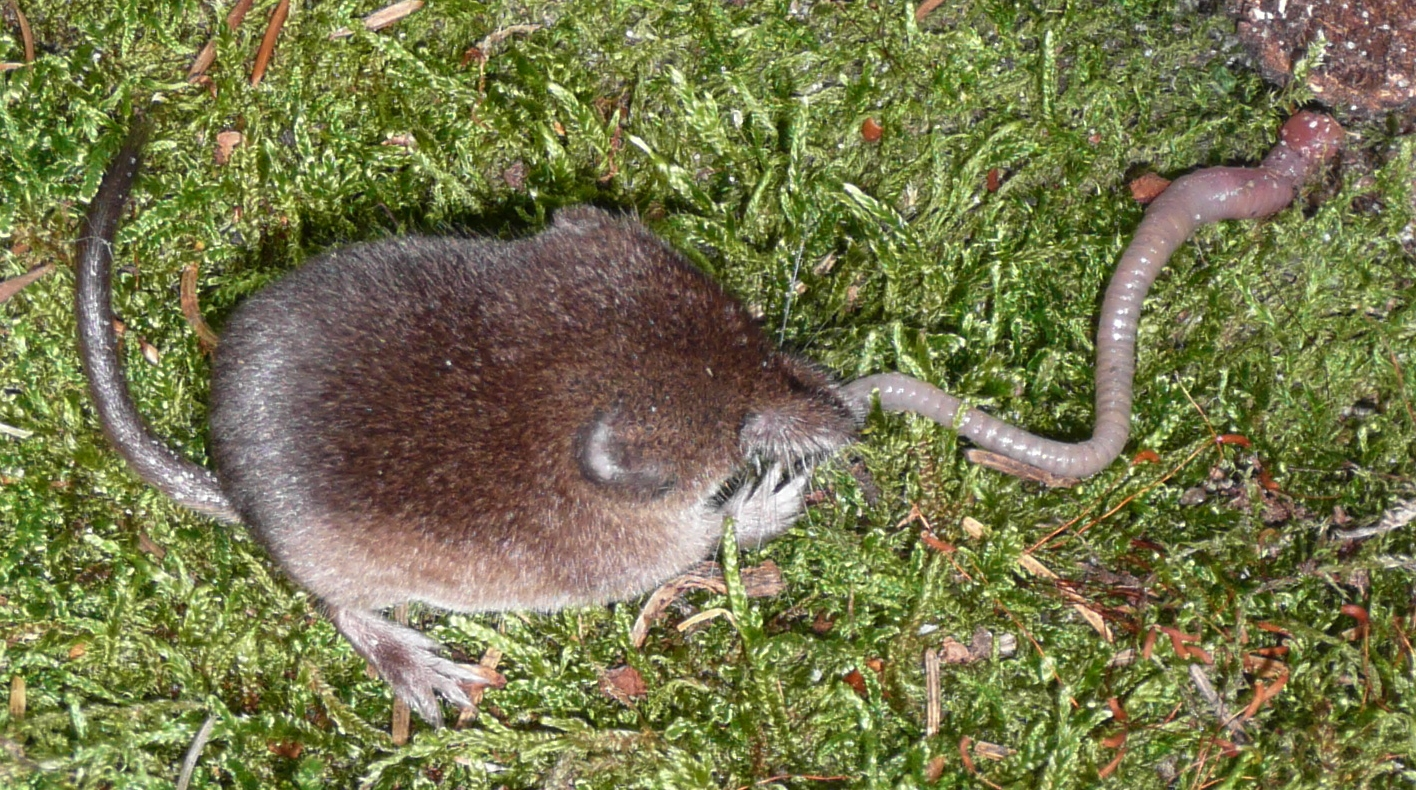
Common shrew (Soricidae)

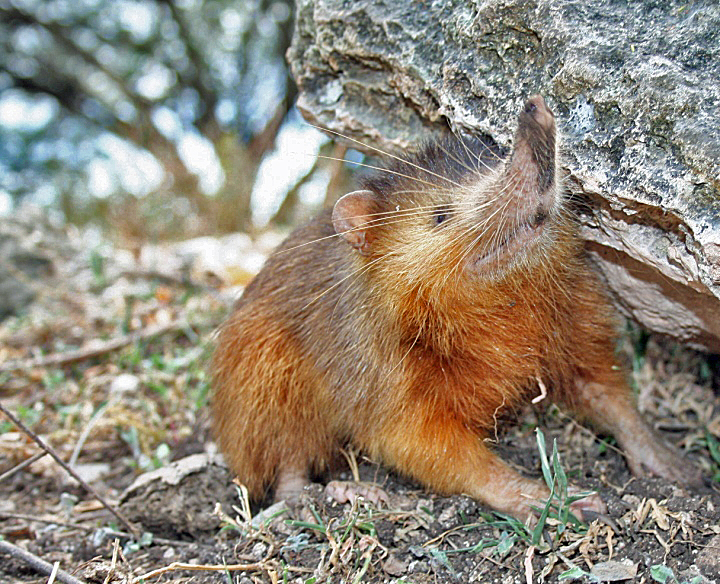
Hispaniolan solenodon (Solenodontidae); solenodons are estimated to have diverged from other extant eulipotyphlans in the Late Cretaceous.

- Order Eulipotyphla (= 'Lipotyphla' - Afrosoricida = 'Erinaceomorpha' + 'Soricomorpha')
  - Family Erinaceidae
    - Subfamily Erinaceinae: hedgehogs
    - Subfamily Galericinae: gymnures or moonrats
  - Family Soricidae
    - Subfamily Crocidurinae: white-toothed shrews
    - Subfamily Soricinae: red-toothed shrews
    - Subfamily Myosoricinae: African white-toothed shrews
  - Family Talpidae
    - Subfamily Talpinae: Old World moles and desmans
    - Subfamily Scalopinae: New World moles
    - Subfamily Uropsilinae: shrew-like moles
  - Family Solenodontidae: solenodons
  - † Family Nesophontidae: extinct West Indian shrews
  - † Family Amphilemuridae
  - † Family Nyctitheriidae
  - † Family Plesiosoricidae

Family-level cladogram of modern eulipotyphlan relationships, following Roca et al. and Brace et al.:

- Eulipotyphla
  - - †Nesophontidae
    - Solenodontidae
  - - Talpidae
    - - Soricidae
      - Erinaceidae

The upper and lower basal subclades within the tree are the suborders Solenodonota and Erinaceota, respectively. These two branches are estimated to have split ~72–74 million years (Ma) ago. The Nesophontidae and Solenodontidae are thought to have separated roughly 57 Ma ago. Split times for talpids vs. soricids plus erinaceids, and for soricids vs. erinaceids, have been estimated at 69 Ma and 64 Ma ago, respectively.
