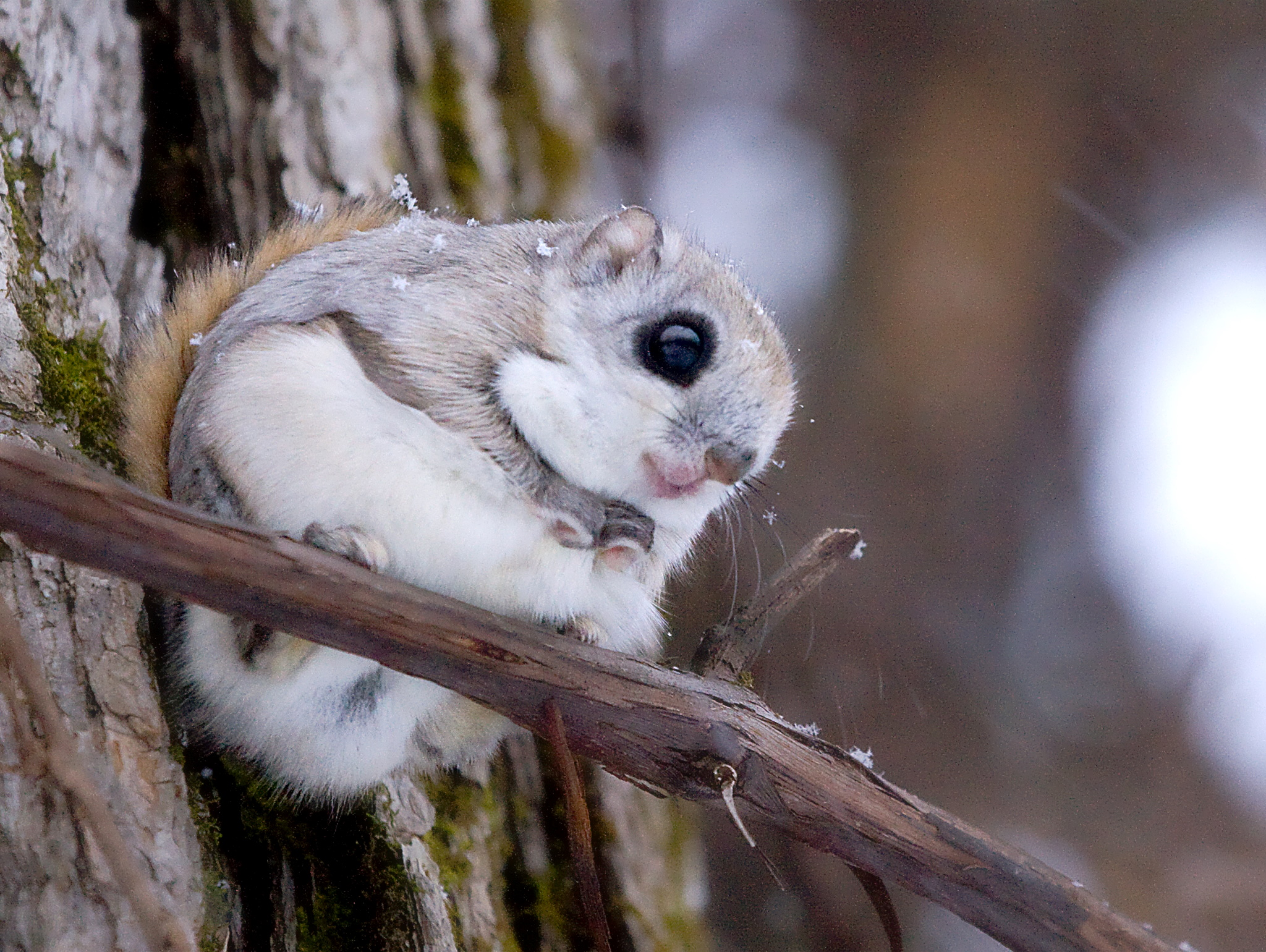
- In Higashikawa (March 2009)

Scientific classification
- Kingdom: Animalia
- Phylum: Chordata
- Class: Mammalia
- Order: Rodentia
- Family: Sciuridae
- Genus: Pteromys
- Species: P. volans
- Subspecies: P. v. orii

Trinomial name
- Pteromys volans orii (Kuroda, 1921)

Synonyms
- Sciuropterus russicus orii Pteromys orii Pteromys volans orii

= Ezo flying squirrel =

Subspecies of mammal

The Ezo flying squirrel (Pteromys volans orii) or Ezo-momonga (Japanese: エゾモモンガ) is a subspecies of the Siberian flying squirrel. It is endemic to Hokkaidō, Japan, part of the region once known as Ezo. In the legends of the local Ainu, the Ezo flying squirrel or A-kamui (Ainu: アッ・カムイ) is a tutelary deity of children. Together with the Ezo chipmunk (Eutamias sibiricus lineatus) and Ezo squirrel (Sciurus vulgaris orientis), it is one of the three sciurids (members of the squirrel family (Sciuridae)) found on the island, to the north of Blakiston's Line, each having its own particular ecological niche.

== Taxonomy ==
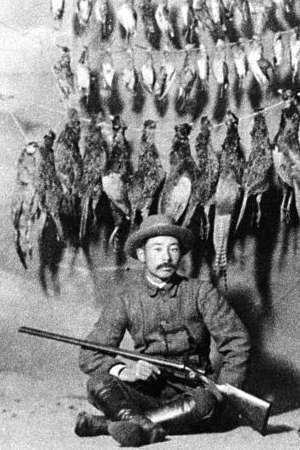
Specimen collector Orii Hyōjirō in Taishō 2 (1913)

The Ezo flying squirrel was first described by Nagamichi Kuroda in 1921, as Sciuropterus russicus orii. In 1940, John Reeves Ellerman elevated the Ezo flying squirrel to species rank and transferred it to the genus Pteromys, the new combination being Pteromys orii. In 1951, Ellerman and Morrison-Scott again treated the Ezo flying squirrel as a subspecies of the Siberian flying squirrel, under the combination Pteromys volans orii. The subspecific name honours Orii Hyōjirō, collector of the type specimen in "Uyenai" (植苗) (now part of the city of Tomakomai), old Iburi Province, on 13 March 1920.

== Description ==
The Ezo flying squirrel is a small arboreal rodent with a white belly and a back and tail that is dark brown in summer and is grey-brown in winter. Around the eyes, there is a ring of dark brown fur. Males are slightly longer in length than females, with male's body length being 16 to 18 cm (6.3 to 7.1 in), and females about 15 cm (5.9 in). The length of the body from head to tail is on average 30 cm (12 in) together. Tail length ranges from 9.2 to 11.8 cm (3.6 to 4.6 in), the hind feet (excluding claws) from 3.2 to 3.65 cm (1.26 to 1.44 in), and the ears from 1.75 to 2.15 cm (0.69 to 0.85 in). The body weight ranges from 62 to 123 g (2.2 to 4.3 oz) (n=22).

== Distribution and habitat for living ==
While the Siberian flying squirrel (P. volans) at species level may be found across the coniferous forest zone from Finland and the Baltic to Korea, the Hokkaidō population is recognized as a distinct, endemic subspecies. On Hokkaidō, it inhabits the coniferous, broad-leaved deciduous, and mixed forests, both montane and lowland, and may also be found in windbreaks and groves in urban parks. Males may range over an area of some 2.2 to 4.8 hectares (5.4 to 11.9 acres), while the home range of females is typically around 1.7 ha (4.2 acres). In Furano, population density has been estimated at two individuals per hectare.

== Behaviour and ecology ==
The Ezo flying squirrel is nocturnal, typically leaving the nest to forage several times a night, from 15–20 minutes after sunset to 20–25 minutes before sunrise. It does not hibernate, but activity beyond the nest is reduced during winter; squirrels emerge once a day for food around daybreak. Lifespan in the wild rarely exceeds three years, but captive specimens can live for four or five years.

=== Locomotion ===
In a study of thirty-one squirrel glides in Obihiro, there was a mean horizontal gliding distance of 18.90 metres (62.0 ft), horizontal distances ranging from 4.30 to 49.40 metres (14.1 to 162.1 ft). The mean glide ratio (calculated as horizontal distance travelled divided by vertical descent) was 1.70, with again a wide range of values, glide ratios ranging between 0.48 and 3.31. While the females were heavier than the males, there was no significant sex- or weight-related difference in glide distances or ratios.

=== Diet and predation ===
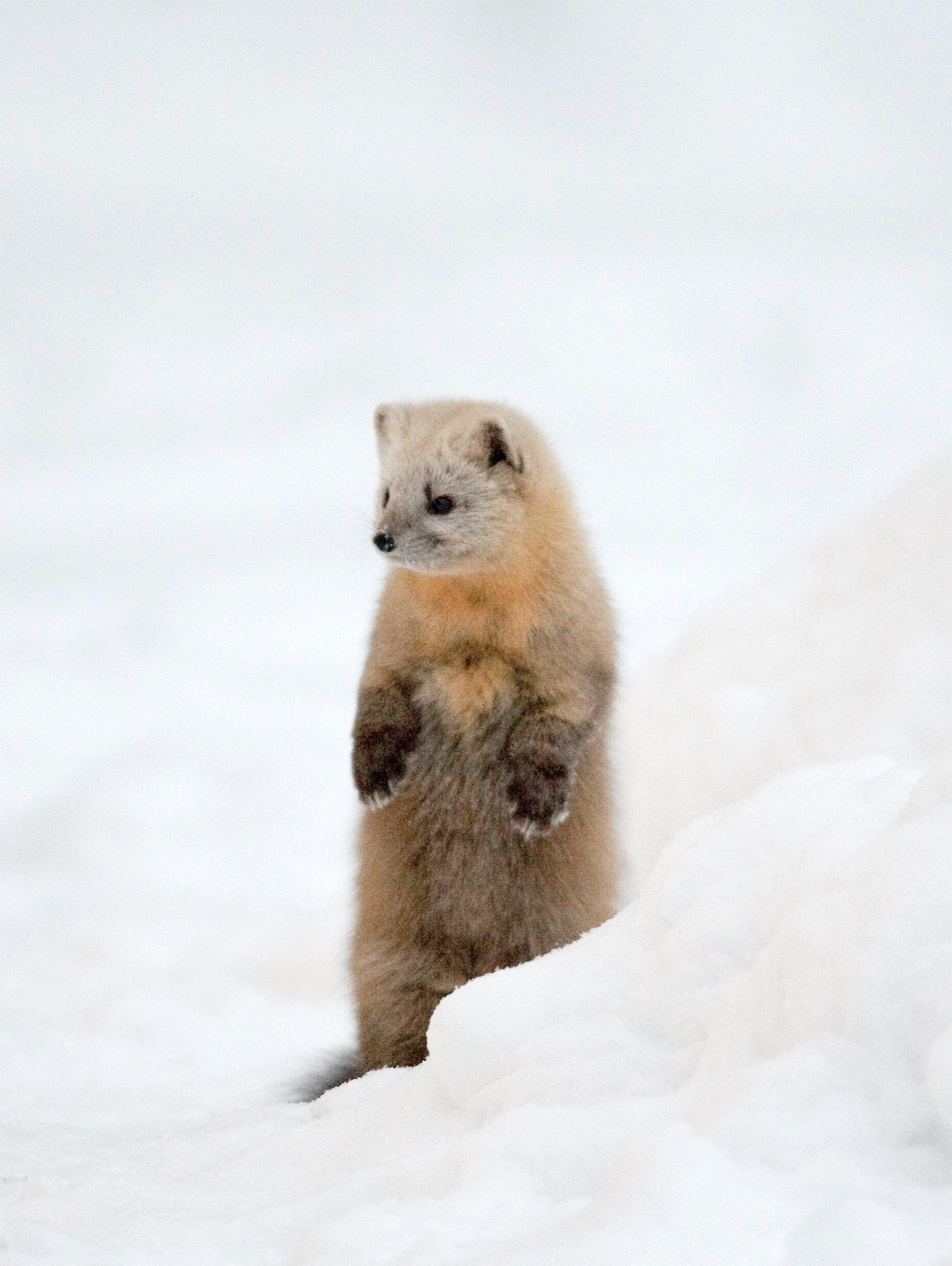
Remains of Ezo flying squirrels are sometimes found in Ezo sable droppings

The Ezo flying squirrel is entirely herbivorous, feeding on leaves, buds, flowers, seeds, acorns, catkins, and fruits of both broad-leaf trees and conifers, with significant seasonal variation. In spring, young leaves form a major part of the diet, including those of willows (Salix spp.), Japanese white birch (Betula platyphylla), and East Asian alder (Alnus japonica); in summer, cherries, mulberries, birch and maple seeds, and the unripe acorns of the daimyō oak (Quercus dentata) and Mongolian oak (Quercus crispula); prior to winter, in order to put on weight—and increase the chance of survival—there is increased foraging of highly nutritious pine nuts; during the winter, birch and alder leaves and buds are consumed.

Predators include the Ezo red fox (Vulpes vulpes schrencki), Ezo sable (Martes zibellina brachyura), Ural owl (Strix uralensis), Blakiston's fish owl (Bubo blakistoni), sparrowhawk (Accipiter nisus), black kite (Milvus migrans), and domestic cat (Felis catus).

=== Nesting ===
Nests are in tree hollows and, on occasion, man-made bird boxes. A study of thirty-six winter nests found Sakhalin fir (Abies sachalinensis) was the preferred choice (52.8%), followed by the painted maple (Acer pictum subsp. mono), Erman's birch (Betula ermanii), Mongolian oak (Quercus mongolica var. grosseserrata), prickly castor oil tree (Kalopanax septemlobus), and Japanese walnut (Juglans ailantifolia). The holes used for nests, most of which were located at least 10 metres (33 ft) up the tree, heights ranging from 1 to 12 metres (3 ft 3 in to 39 ft 4 in), had typically originally been excavated by woodpeckers, or coincided with knots, frost cracks, and areas damaged by tree fungus. To line the nest, the finely shredded inner bark of vines such as yama-budō (Vitis coignetiae) and dry moss are used. Repurposed nests include those of the great spotted woodpecker (Dendrocopos major), Oriental turtle dove (Streptopelia orientalis), and members of the crow family (Corvidae). In winter, deeper holes are preferred, and three to five individuals may share a single nest, to help keep warm.

=== Reproduction ===
There are two mating seasons, the first in late February/early March (with birth from the middle of April to early May), the second in June (with birth from late July to the middle of August). During this time, females have their own territory, while males overlap with each other and with more than one female. The litter size averages 3.3 kittens, ranging from two to six. Kittens weigh 3 to 4 grams (0.11 to 0.14 oz) at birth and are red and hairless, their eyes and ears closed. Their digits, initially joined together, begin to separate one-by-one after ten to twelve days. Teeth in the lower jaw begin to appear after twenty days, and a week or so later in the upper jaw. Around thirty days after birth, the whole body is covered with fur. After 35 days, the eyes open. Movement of the back legs develops later than that of the front legs, after around twenty days; from around 28 days, kittens are able to walk using all four limbs. Approximately 40 days after birth, young leave the nest for the first time and begin to consume solid food. After around 50 days, kittens start to practise gliding. Young squirrels leave the nest and their parents around 60 days after birth.

== Conservation ==
The Ezo flying squirrel is classed as a protected (rather than game) species. Forest fragmentation has been identified as a threat due to their method of locomotion.

== Ainu culture ==
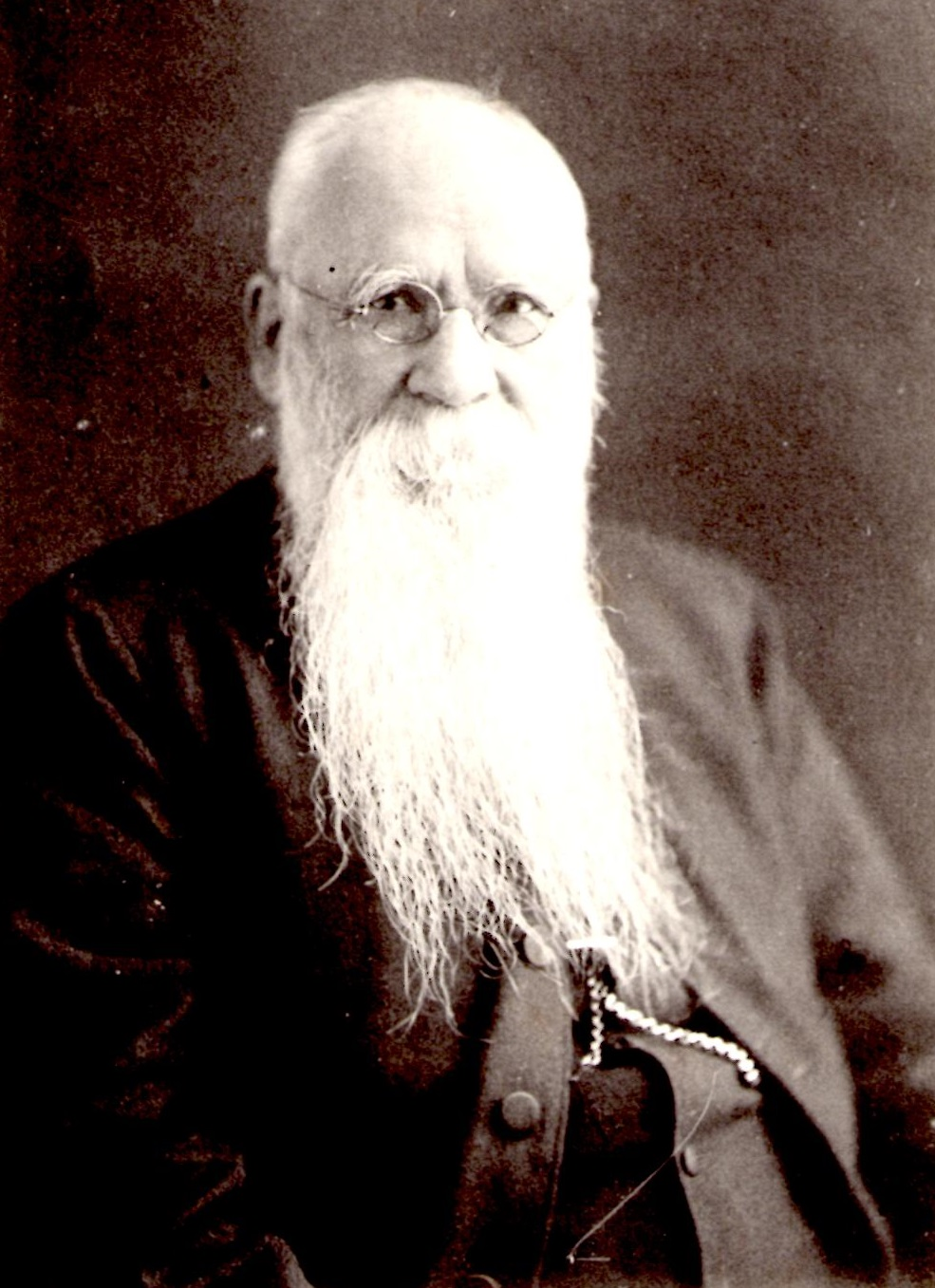
Missionary John Batchelor documented the importance of the flying squirrel to the Ainu

According to John Batchelor's account of the folklore of the Ainu of Hokkaidō, the flying squirrel—of the three Japanese flying squirrels, the Japanese giant flying squirrel (Petaurista leucogenys), Japanese dwarf flying squirrel (Pteromys momonga), and Ezo flying squirrel, the last is the only one to be found north of Blakiston's Line—was known as At-kamui or "the Divine prolific one", due to the belief that it could produce up to thirty young in one litter, and regarded as a bird, since it could fly. Where an Ainu man and his wife were childless, and initial appeal to the goddess of fire and her consort was to no avail, the husband, without his wife's knowledge, should go into the mountains to hunt for a flying squirrel, which he should then cut into small pieces, boil, and place upon a tray. Using Inau sticks, and praying to the sacrificed squirrel for assistance, he should give the meat to his wife to eat, again without her knowing from what "bird" it was derived. Only if this feast, known as uatama marapto or "the feast of placing the prolific one", proved unsuccessful should he resort to taking a second or third wife.

== See also ==
- List of mammals in Japan
- Japanese Red List
- Japanese dwarf flying squirrel
