= Blakiston's Line =

Line separating the fauna of Hokkaidō and Honshū

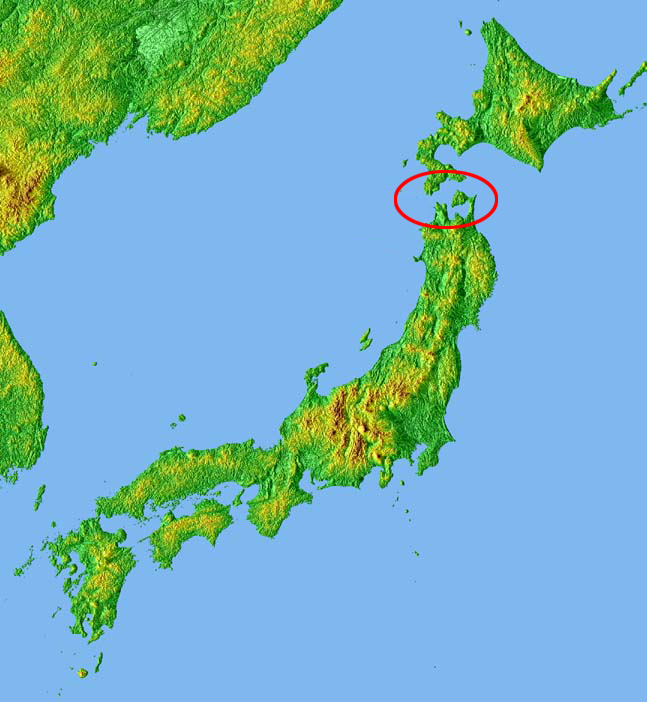
The Tsugaru Strait which forms the natural zoogeographical boundary of Blakiston's Line

The Blakiston Line or Blakiston's Line is a faunal boundary line drawn between two of the four largest islands of Japan: Hokkaidō in the north and Honshū, south of it. It can be compared with faunal boundary lines like the Wallace Line. Certain animal species can only be found north of Blakiston's Line, while certain other species can only be found south of it.

Thomas Blakiston, who lived in Japan from 1861 to 1884 and who spent much of that time in Hakodate, Hokkaido, was the first person to notice that animals in Hokkaidō, Japan's northern island, were related to northern Asian species, whereas those on Honshū to the south were related to those from southern Asia. The Tsugaru Strait between the two islands was therefore established as a zoogeographical boundary, and became known as Blakiston's Line. This finding was first published to the Asiatic Society of Japan in a paper of 14 February 1883, named Zoological Indications of Ancient Connection of the Japan islands with the Continent.

== Explanations and hypotheses on the existence of Blakiston's Line ==
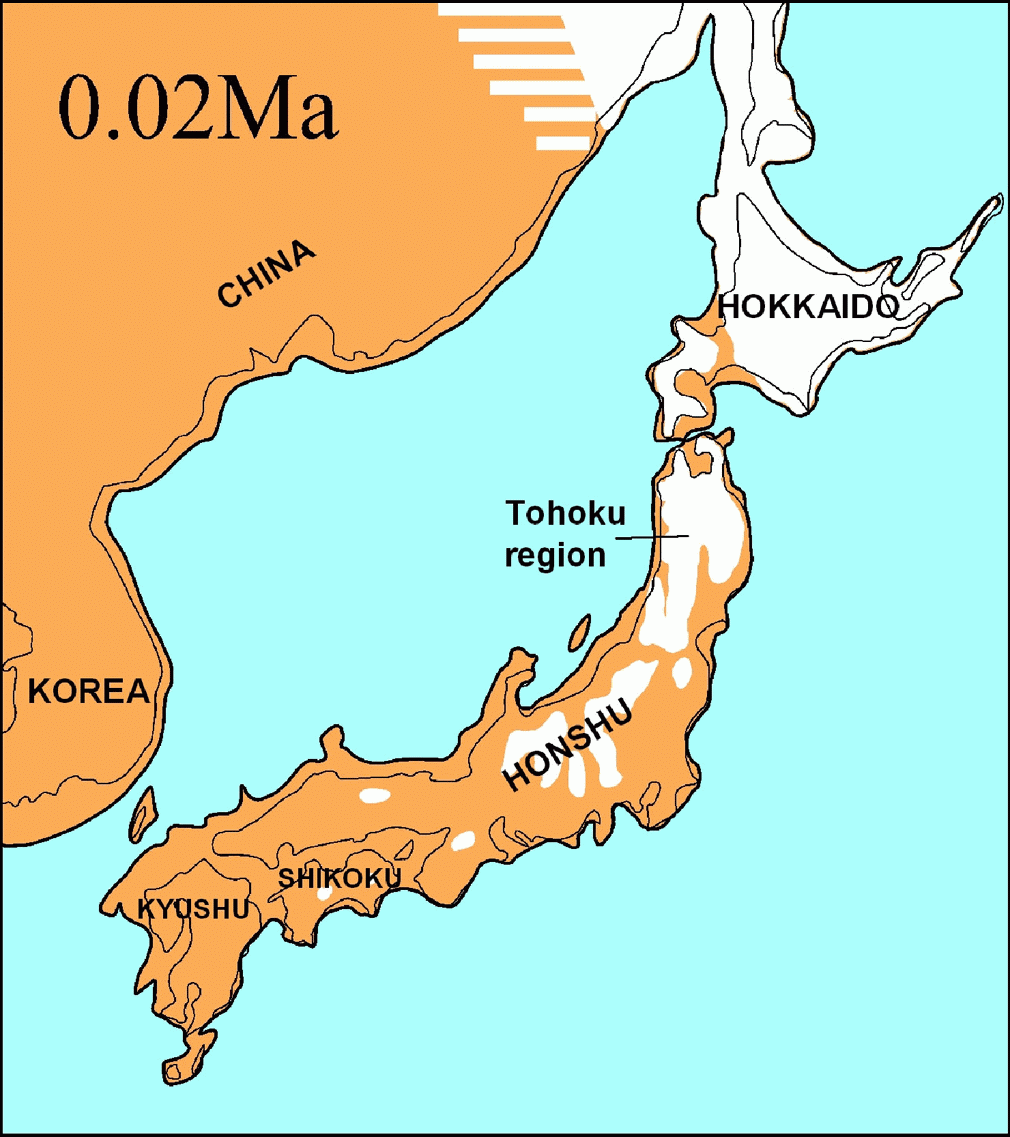
Japanese archipelago, possibly 10,000–20,000 years ago, with Hokkaido connected to Honshu by a land bridge; the thin black line indicates present-day shorelines.

The difference in the fauna can probably be attributed to land bridges that may have existed in the past. Whilst Hokkaido may have had land bridges to the north of Asia, via Sakhalin and the Kuril Islands, the other islands of Japan like Honshu, Shikoku and Kyushu, may have been connected to the Asian continent via the Korean Peninsula. As to when these land bridges existed, scientists do not agree. It may have been between 26,000 and 18,000 years ago, it may have been later than that. Sakhalin, the island just north of Japan, and Hokkaido may even have been connected to the mainland as recently as 10,000 years ago or less. Apart from these former land bridges, there are more factors that play a role in why there is a difference in the fauna north and south of the line:

- The Tsugaru Strait is relatively deep, with a maximum depth of 449 m.
- The narrowest part of the Tsugaru Strait is 12.1 miles (19.5 km).
- Currents in the Tsugaru Strait are strong, tidal currents coincide with ocean currents
- The climate in the north is generally far colder than that in the south.
- The influence of the human population in the north is different from that in the south, the north is more sparsely populated and there are more Ainu living in the north.

== Species north and south of Blakiston's Line ==
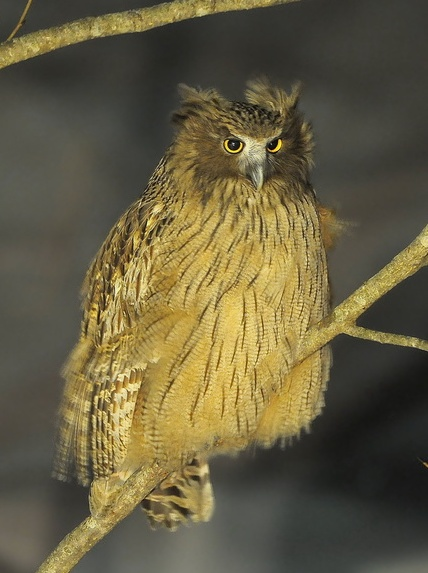
Blakiston's fish owl was named after Thomas Blakiston

Besides birds, animals that are of different origins north and south of the Blakiston Line include wolves, bears and chipmunks. Monkeys do not even live north of Blakiston's Line. The following table gives some examples of animal species involved:

North of Blakiston's Line	South of Blakiston's Line
Ussuri brown bear	Asiatic black bear
Red squirrel Ezo flying squirrel	Japanese squirrel Japanese giant flying squirrel
Hokkaido wolf (extinct)	Japanese wolf (extinct)
Yezo sika deer	Honshu sika deer
Ezo red fox	Japanese fox
Sable	Japanese marten
East Siberian (or Ezo) stoat	Japanese stoat
Common least weasel	Japanese least weasel
	Japanese weasel
	Japanese macaque
	Japanese serow
	Japanese shrew mole
	Japanese boar
	Japanese badger
Siberian chipmunk	
Siberian salamander Ezo salamander	
Northern pika	
Blakiston's fish owl	
Hazel grouse	

Species that can only be found on the Ryukyu Islands are excluded from this table, even though their habitat is clearly south of Blakiston's Line, as other factors account for their distribution. Besides animal species that can only be found either north or south of Blakiston's Line, there are very many that can be found at either side of the line, in part because of human involvement. Examples of the latter are the Japanese Shorthorn, a breed of small Japanese beef cattle that is distributed in northern Honshu and also in Hokkaido, and the Japanese weasel, which was introduced to Hokkaido by human intervention.

It has also been studied whether or not this biogeographic boundary applies to far smaller organisms like soil microbes.

== Possible trans-Blakiston's Line movements by land animals ==
On the contrary to major hypothesis that terrestrial animals couldn't move across Blakiston's Line, excavations of fossils of Palaeoloxodon naumanni and Sinomegaceros yabei (Japanese) from Hokkaidō, and moose and Ussuri brown bear from Honshū indicate a new assumption that terrestrial animals could have crossed the strait periodically.

== Other faunal boundary lines in Japan ==
Apart from Blakiston's Line, other faunal boundary lines have been proposed for Japan, like Watase's line (Tokara Straits): for mammals, reptiles, amphibians and spiders, Hatta's line (Soya line): for reptiles, amphibians and freshwater invertebrates, Hachisuka's line for birds and Miyake's line for insects.

== The role of Thomas Blakiston ==
There has been speculation about why Blakiston was the person who discovered this faunal boundary line and no one before him had done so. Andrew Davis, who has been a professor at Hokkaido University for four years, argued that this may have been because of his unusual position in Japanese society as a European.

Blakiston spent much time researching bird species in Japan. At that time, Japanese ornithology was at its infancy. In 1886 Leonhard Stejneger remarked: "Our knowledge of Japanese ornithology is only fragmentary" The years after his stay in Japan, Blakiston made publications on birds in Japan in general and on water birds of Japan in particular. Bird species like Blakiston's Fish Owl (Bubo blakistoni) and Regulus regulus japonensis Blakiston have been named after him. In Hakodate, Blakiston made a large collection of birds, which is currently located at the museum of Hakodate. The distributions of many bird species observe the Blakiston line, since many birds do not cross even the shortest stretches of open ocean water.

For his discovery of Blakiston's Line, a monument was erected in his honor on Mount Hakodate.
