= Sirtsi Nature Reserve =

Protected area in Estonia

- Location within Estonia
- Location: Estonia
- Nearest city: Narva
- Coordinates: 59°15′58″N 26°48′33″E
- Area: 4,558 ha (11,260 acres)
- Established: 1976

Sirtsi Nature Reserve is a nature reserve situated in western Estonia, and straddles the border between Lääne-Viru and Ida-Viru County.

The nature reserve was founded first and foremost to protect brown bears in the area. It is centred on a system of mires and a bog, and the surrounding forests.

Apart from brown bear, the nature reserve also functions as a sanctuary for other large mammals such as Eurasian lynx and gray wolf. In addition, shy animals such as black stork and Siberian flying squirrel live in the reserve.

The former winter road between Central Estonia and Saint Petersburg ran through this area and its course can still be identified.
