= Kasamori-ji =

Buddhist temple in Chiba Prefecture, Japan

- 笠森寺
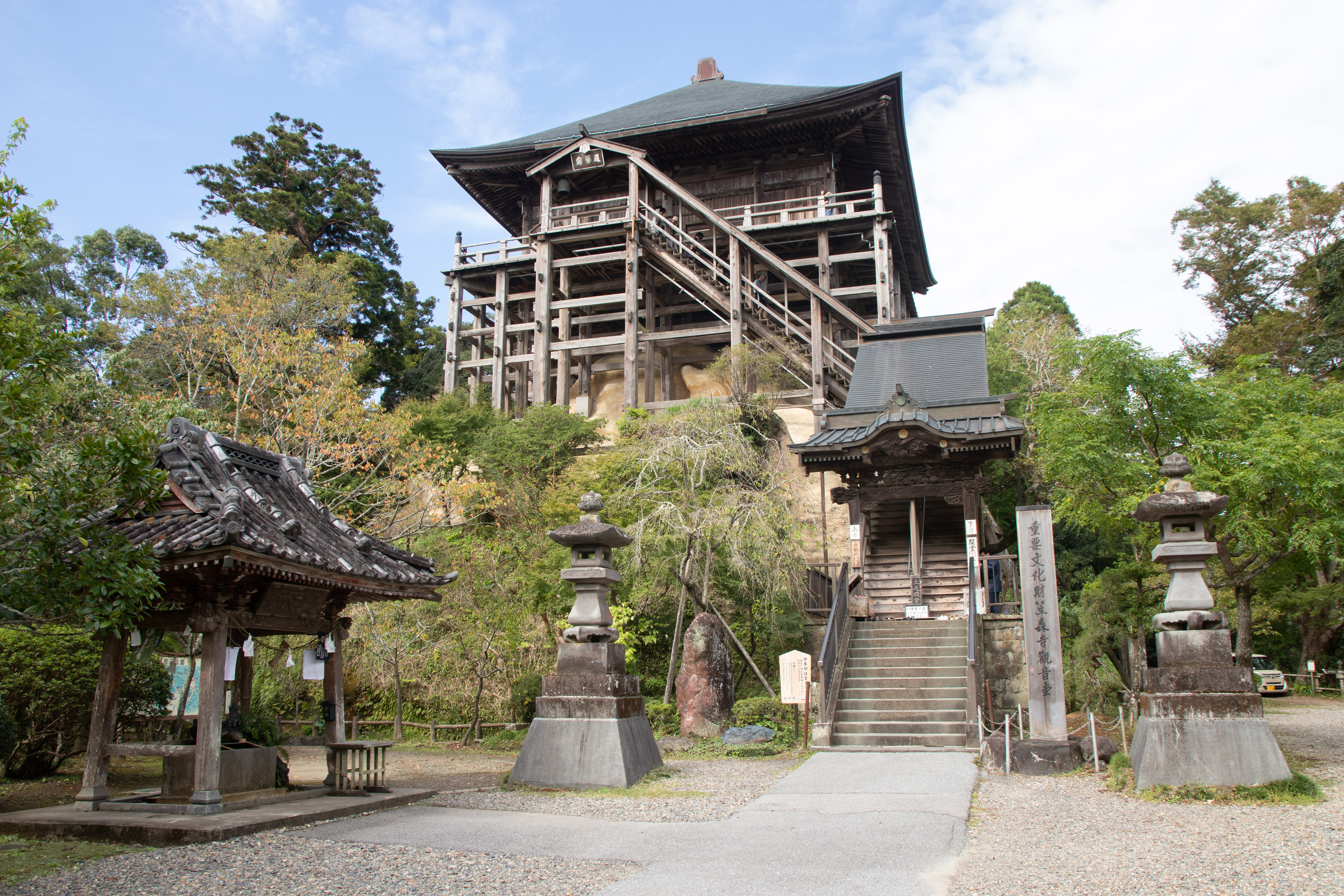
- Kasamori-ji Kannon-dō

- Location within Chiba Prefecture Location within Japan

Religion
- Affiliation: Buddhist
- Deity: Jūichimen Kannon Bosatsu
- Rite: Tendai
- Status: functional

Location
- Location: 302 Kasamori, Chōnan-machi, Chōsei-gun, Chiba-ken
- Country: Japan
- Interactive map of Kasamori-ji
- Coordinates: 35°23′58.6″N 140°11′56.1″E

Architecture
- Founder: c. Saichō
- Completed: c.784

Website
- Official website
- National Important Cultural Property

Kasamori-ji (笠森寺) is a Buddhist temple located in the town of Chōnan, Chiba Prefecture, Japan. It belongs to the Tendai sect and its honzon is a hibutsu statue of Jūichimen Kannon Bosatsu shown to the public in the years of the Ox and Horse in the 12-year cycle of the Chinese zodiac. The temple's full name is Daihi-zan Nankō-in Kasamori-ji (大悲山 楠光院 笠森寺).The temple is the 31st stop on the Bandō Sanjūsankasho pilgrimage route. The temple is also called "Kasamori-dera" using the alternate pronunciation of the Chinese character for temple (tera). It is located within the borders of the Kasamori Tsurumai Prefectural Natural Park.

== Overview ==
The foundation of this temple is uncertain. According to the temple's legend, the Tendai monk Saichō (767–822) visited the area in 784 and carved a statue of the Jūichimen Kannon Bosatsu, and on a sacred camphor tree and enshrined it in small chapel. Nichiren is said to have frequently prayed at Kasamori-ji, and an image of him in his quarters at the temple exists. Kasamori-ji appears in both an ukiyo-e woodblock print by Hiroshige II (1829–1869) as part of the series One Hundred Views of the Provinces. Additionally, Matsuo Bashō (1644–1694) wrote a haiku about the temple. A marker with the haiku is located in front of the temple gate.

The temple is 11.7 kilometers west (approximately 23 minutes by car) from Mobara Station on the JR East Sotobō Line, or 6.9 kilometers east of Kazusa-Ushiku Station on the Kominato Railway Kominato Line.

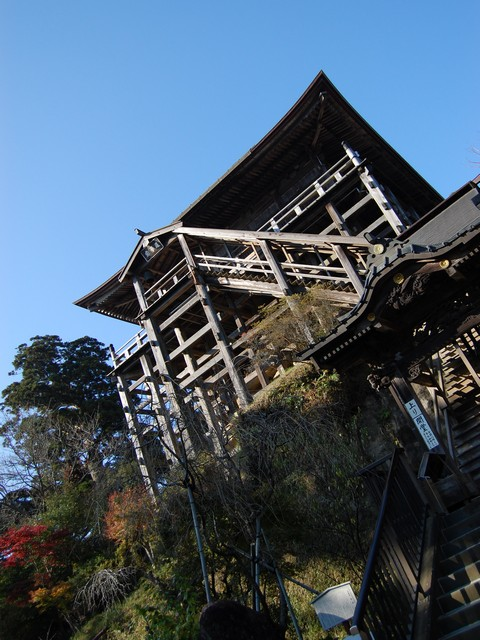
Kannon-dō

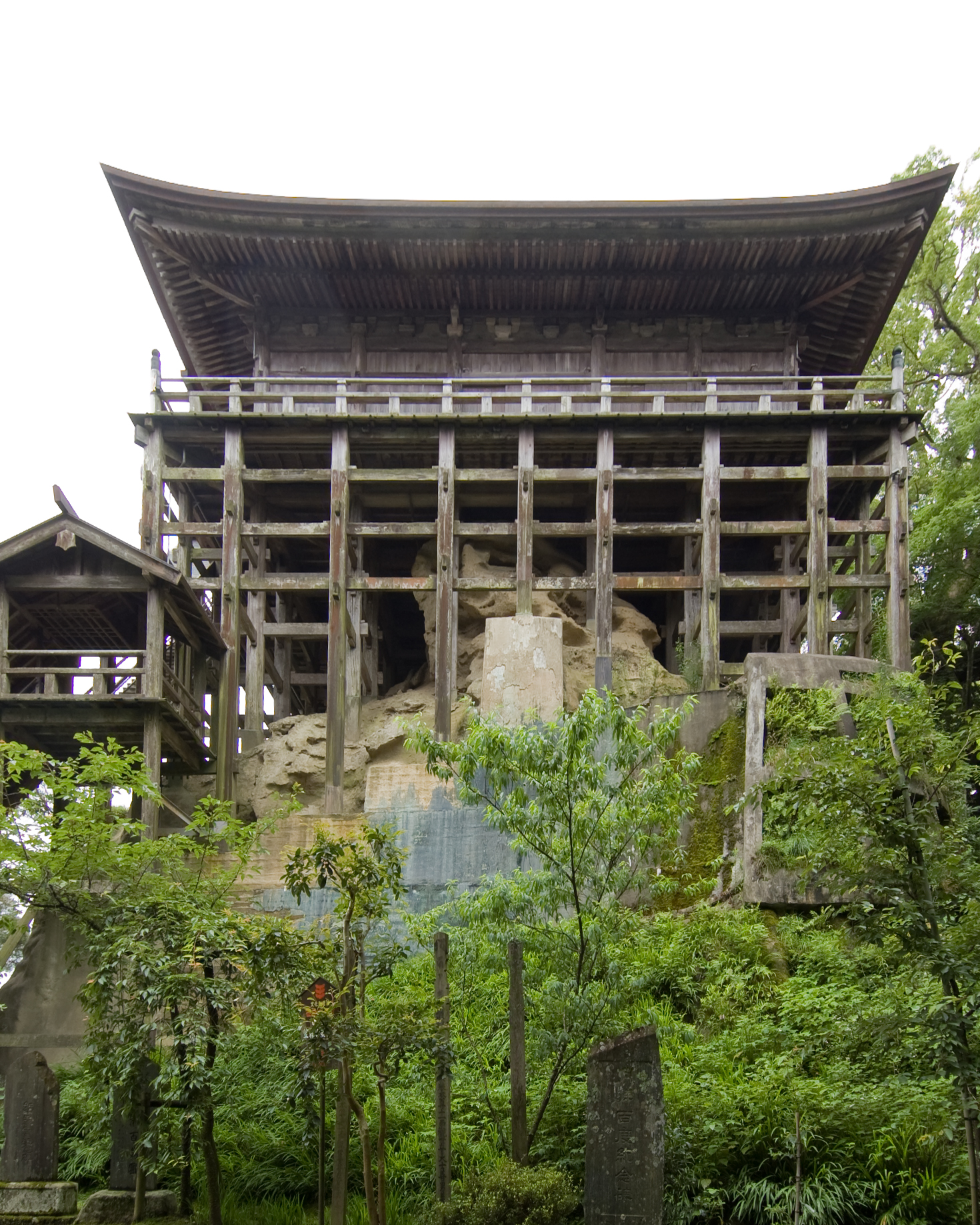
Kannon-dō

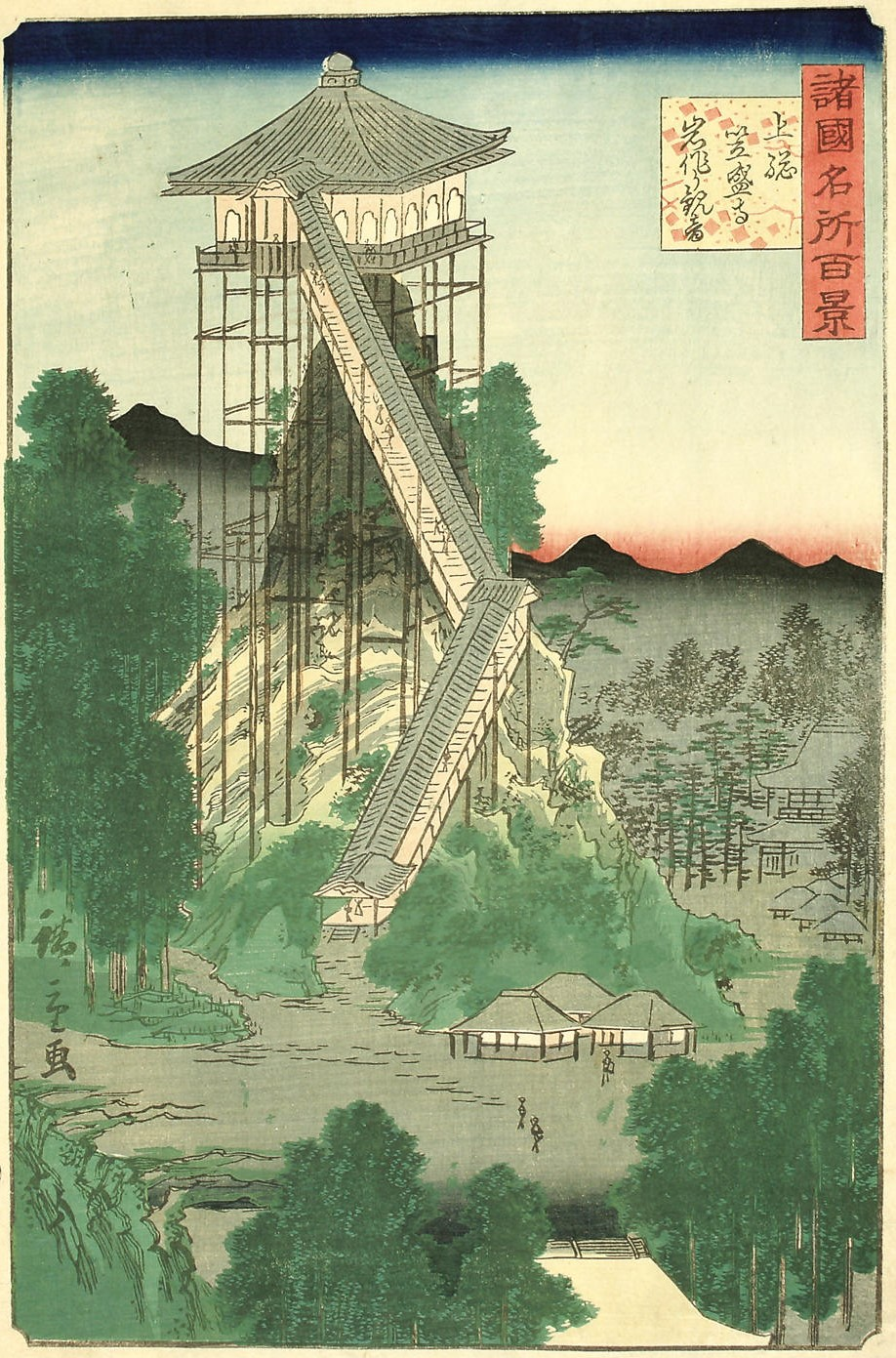
Ukiyoe by Hiroshige

== Cultural Properties ==
=== National Important Cultural Properties ===
- Kannon-dō (観音堂), Sengoku period. The Main Hall of the temple stands on top of a large rock. It is the only surviving example of a hall built in the shihōkakezukuri (四方懸造) style; the structure is raised on 61 large stilts on all four sides. The building was first erected in 1028 at the request of Emperor Go-Ichijō as part of a general revival of the temple. A document uncovered during a modern repair of the temple indicates that the structure dates from between 1573 and 1596. The building consists of five rooms in the front and four rooms on the sides, with the center divided into front and back, with the front half serving as the outer building and the back half serving as the inner sanctum. The outer hall is made of plain wood, the inner hall is painted, and the hall is surrounded by a balustraded rim.
- Cast bronze arabesque-patterned lantern (鋳銅唐草文釣燈籠), Muromachi period, set of two. These hanging lanterns are 34.5-cm and 31.8-cm, respectively, and were made by pouring bronze into a single mold.

The hat is shaped like a flower petal, and the top has a shallowly cast arabesque pattern, gently curving upwards. There are three peach-shaped boar-shaped wind holes on the top.

=== National Natural Monument ===
- Kasamori-dera Natural Forest (笠森寺自然林). The forest around Kasamori-ji is a remnant of a Japanese temperate rainforest that has been protected as a sacred area since the founding of the temple. The tall tree layer is mainly composed of Castanopsis sieboldii, and many ferns can also be seen, and because the natural environment is preserved, animals such as Japanese weasels, Japanese badgers, and Japanese squirrels, birds such as Oriental scops owls, Great spotted woodpecker, and Eurasian sparrowhawk, and can be seen. It has been designated as a National Natural Monument.

=== Chiba Prefectural Tangible Cultural Properties ===
- Waniguchi (鋳銅鰐口). Muromachi period (1427). This large cast bronze gong that is hung under the front eaves of the Kannon-do, and was used by pilgrims to announce their prayers. It has a diameter of 46.9 cm, a thickness of 10.1 cm, and an inscription with the year 1427, and name of the donor.
- Bianqing (鋳銅孔雀文磬). Muromachi period (1426). This cast bronze chime is used in Buddhist ceremonies. It is made of cast bronze with a 24.4 cm length, ad height of 16.6 cm. The decoration of peacocks facing each other, centered on an eight-leaf, multi-petaled lotus pattern is the same on both the front and back. It is inscribed with the name of the temple, the date of 1426, and the name of the donor.
