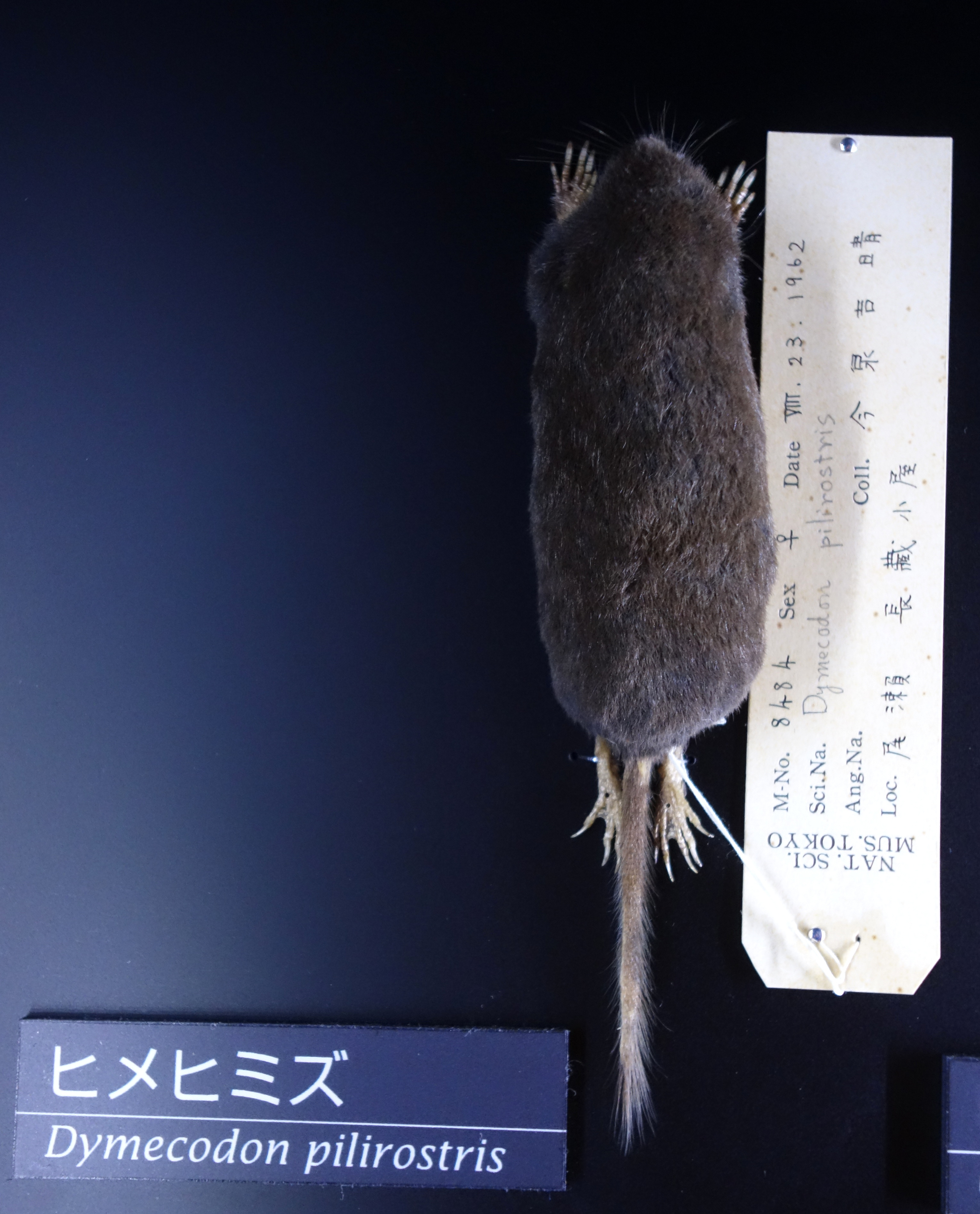

Conservation status
- Least Concern (IUCN 3.1)

Scientific classification
- Kingdom: Animalia
- Phylum: Chordata
- Class: Mammalia
- Order: Eulipotyphla
- Family: Talpidae
- Genus: Dymecodon; True, 1886
- Species: D. pilirostris

Binomial name
- Dymecodon pilirostris True, 1886
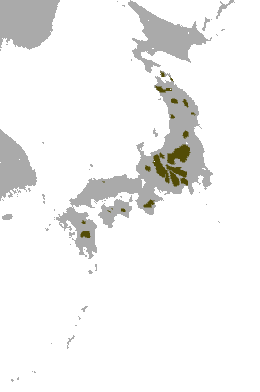
- True's shrew mole range

Synonyms
- Urotrichus pilirostris

= True's shrew mole =

Species of mammal

True's shrew mole (Dymecodon pilirostris) is a species of mammal in the family Talpidae. It is endemic to Japan (Honshu, Shikoku and Kyushu) and is a common species above 1000 meters in grassland, shrubland and forest. Sometimes this species is called the lesser Japanese shrew mole and another species, Urotrichus talpoides, is called the "greater Japanese shrew mole".

It is the only species in the genus Dymecodon. It has sometimes been considered belonging to the genus Urotrichus.

== Etymology ==
The genus name is the compound of δύο (duo) "two", μήκος (mekos) "size", and όδούς (odous) "tooth", so "two size teeth", because of the alternation in size of the teeth in the lower jaw.

== Description ==
D. pilirostris is a mole resembling the Japanese shrew mole, with a head-body length of about 6½ cm covered in thick, 5 mm long, darkbrown fur with a strong greenish metallic lustre, and a tail of about 3½ cm, covered with dark hair of about 7 mm. The palms and soles are covered in darkbrown scales. It differs somewhat from Urotrichus in overall size (smaller) and the relative size of its body parts (such as a relatively longer tail). Its dentition however differs remarkably. The first incisor in the upper jaw is low and broad, the broadest of all teeth in front of the true molars. The second is nearly as broad and comparable in shape. The third incisor and the canine are simple and rounded and about ¼ of the other incisors. The teeth in the lower jaw compare to those in the upper jaw, but the second incisor has an additional conic cusp at its back, there is no third incisor and the canine is minute.

Dentition
3.1.3.3
2.1.3.3
