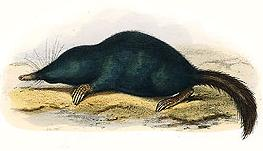
- Himizu, or Japanese shrew mole (Urotrichus talpoides)

Scientific classification
- Kingdom: Animalia
- Phylum: Chordata
- Class: Mammalia
- Order: Eulipotyphla
- Family: Talpidae
- Subfamily: Talpinae
- Tribe: Urotrichini; Dobson, 1883

Genera
- Dymecodon; Urotrichus

= Urotrichini =

Tribe of mammals

Urotrichini is a tribe of the mole family, and consists of Japanese and American shrew-moles. They belong to the Old World moles and relatives branch of the mole family (Talpidae). There are only two species, each of which represents its own genus. The name "shrew-moles" refers to their morphological resemblance to shrews, while generally being thought of as "true moles". The species are the Japanese shrew mole and True's shrew mole.

In Japan, the word "Himizu" (ヒミズ) may refer to both to the Japanese shrew mole in particular and Urotrichini in general; when True's shrew mole is distinguished from the general Himizu forms, the feminine diminutive word "Hime" is added to refer to the smaller size of that species. Although they are common in Japan, their alpine habitats, small size, and secretive lifestyle makes them generally unknown except among some mountain people and researchers.

== Morphology and ecological niche ==
Urotrichini paws are smaller and more downward- and backward-facing than the out-and-to-the-side orientation of the paws of classic moles, although not so much as in shrews. The limbs protrude slightly down and away from the body, as opposed to being invisibly retracted into the body with paws springing from just behind the head, as with moles. As such, Urotrichini are less well adapted than moles to forward burrowing, but better adapted to digging through the softer surface debris, leaf litter, and topsoils of alpine forest surfaces.

== Nocturnality ==
Unlike true moles, Urotrichini are not equally active day and night. Himizu spend a large part of their days sleeping in specially excavated deep subsoil burrows.

== Position within the family Talpidae ==
The Japanese shrewmole and True's shrewmole are more closely related to the American shrew mole than they are either Taiwanese and mainland Asian "shrew moles" or New World moles. These Urotrichini belong to members of the Old World moles subfamily, which also includes moles and desmans. The chiefly Chinese Uropsilinae shrew-like moles, despite previously having been called "shrew-moles" as well, are morphologically and genetically quite different, and comprise a sub-family of their own.

The taxonomy of this group has changed. Both Asiatic species had been thought of as one genus, Urotrichus. More recently, it was decided that a new genus, Dymecodon, be created within the Urotrichini to reflect significant morphological differences.

== Distribution ==
The fluctuating borders between Urotrichini species in Japan have been the subject of study. Dymecodon pilirostris is found only at higher altitudes, possibly due to soil conditions. The larger Urotrichus talpoides dominates richer lowland areas, displacing D. pilirostris to the poorer soils on the steeper slopes of higher altitudes. Maps of these fluctuating boundaries show a sea of Japanese shrew mole territory dotted with islands of True's Shew mole on the steeper areas. This results in isolation of breeding populations of D. pilirostris and notable sub-speciation among the Himizu Hime which is not found among the standard Japanese shrew moles.
