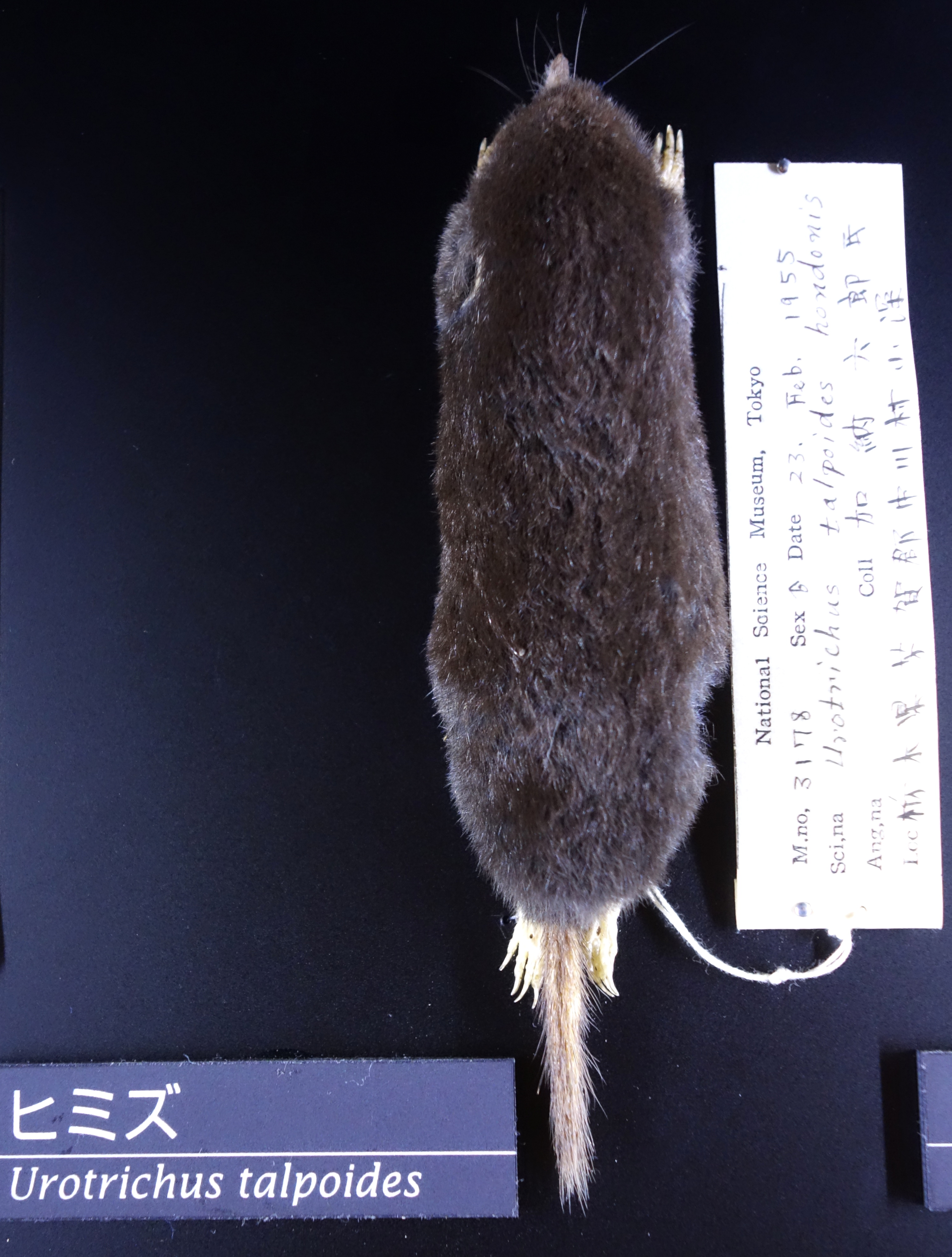
- Japanese shrew mole (Urotrichus talpoides)

Scientific classification
- Kingdom: Animalia
- Phylum: Chordata
- Class: Mammalia
- Order: Eulipotyphla
- Family: Talpidae
- Tribe: Urotrichini
- Genus: Urotrichus; Temminck, 1841

Species
- Urotrichus talpoides; †Urotrichus dolichochir; †Urotrichus giganeus

= Urotrichus =

Urotrichus Temporal range: Miocene - Recent

Genus of mammals

Urotrichus is a genus of talpid that contains a single living species, the Japanese shrew mole (Urotrichus talpoides). Two fossil species (Urotrichus dolichochir and Urotrichus giganeus) are also known.

Urotrichus talpoides is also known from the Late Pleistocene of Japan, while U. giganteus is known from the Miocene of Austria, U. dolichochir from the Miocene of Germany, Poland and Slovakia, and an unidentified species from the Miocene of Greece. The genus may be descended from the structurally-similar Miocene species Tenuibrachiatum storchi, which shares features such as a slender humerus and a missing lower incisor.
