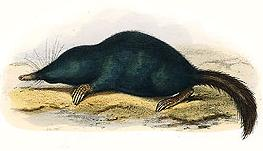

Conservation status
- Least Concern (IUCN 3.1)

Scientific classification
- Kingdom: Animalia
- Phylum: Chordata
- Class: Mammalia
- Order: Eulipotyphla
- Family: Talpidae
- Genus: Urotrichus
- Species: U. talpoides

Binomial name
- Urotrichus talpoides Temminck, 1841
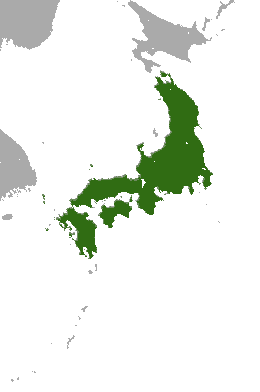
- Japanese shrew mole range

= Japanese shrew mole =

Species of mammal

The Japanese shrew mole (Urotrichus talpoides) or himizu (ヒミズ) is a species of mammal in the family Talpidae.

== Distribution and habitat ==
It is endemic to Japan and is found on Honshu, Shikoku, Kyushu, Awaji Island, Shodo Island, Oki Islands, Tsushima Island, Goto Islands, Mishima Island (Yamaguchi Prefecture), and Awashima Island (Niigata Prefecture), but is absent from Hokkaido, which is north of Blakiston's Line. It is common between sea level and approximately 2,000 m.

== Taxonomy ==
Heinrich Bürger, assistant of Philipp Franz von Siebold, collected specimens of Urotrichus talpoides near Dejima between 1824 and 1826, found lying dead in the fields, which were ultimately described by Temminck after shipping them to the Netherlands.

It is one of three Urotrichini and it is the only extant species in the genus Urotrichus. Sometimes this species is called the greater Japanese shrew mole and another species, True's shrew mole, is called the "lesser Japanese shrew mole".

== Diet ==
The species is an omnivore, but their diet is largely composed of invertebrates and plants, which is why they tend to inhabit soil that is nutrient-rich.
