= Kasamori Tsurumai Prefectural Natural Park =

Natural park in Chiba prefecture, Japan

- 県立笠森鶴舞自然公園
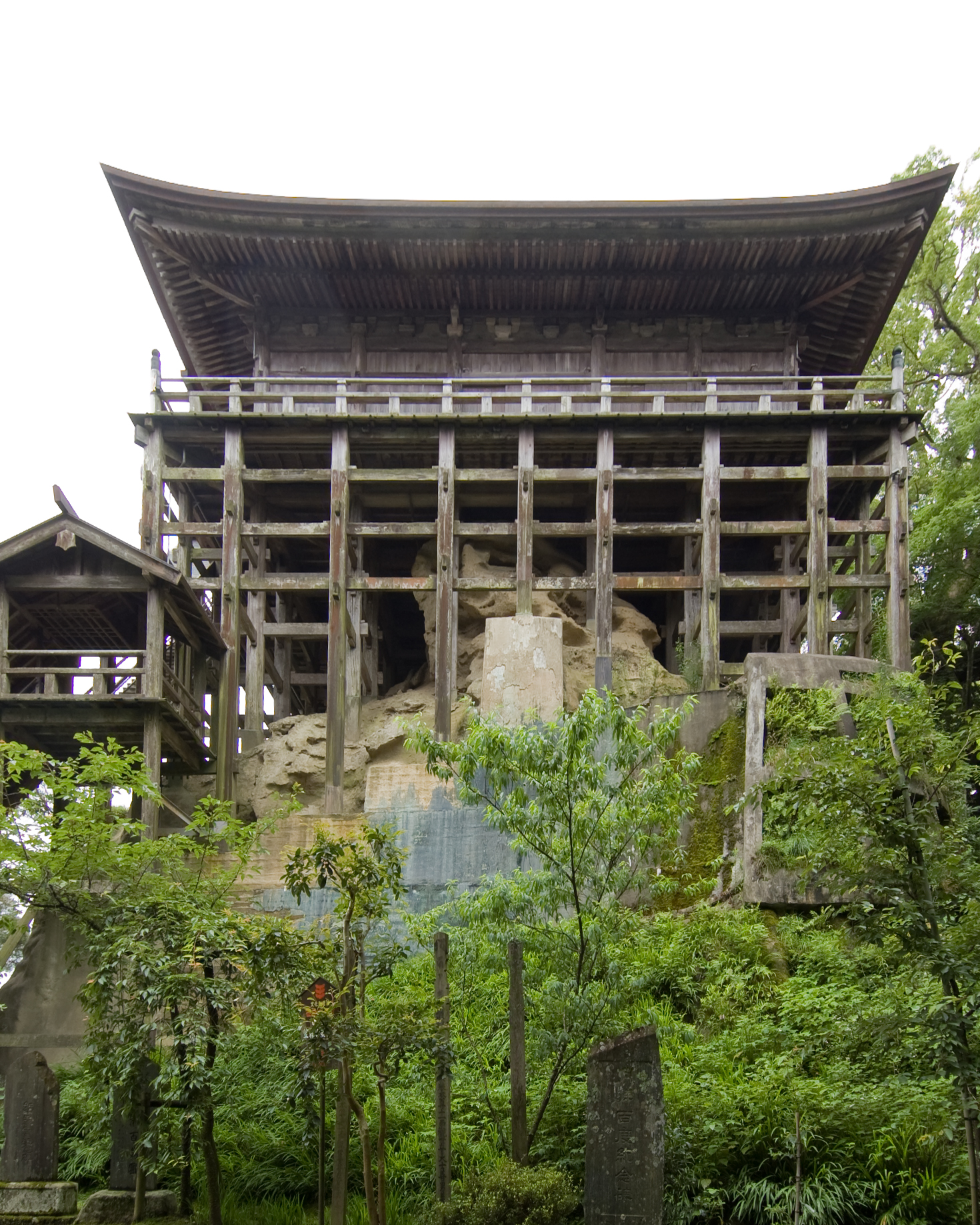
- Kasamori Kannon-dō (ICP)
- Interactive map of Kasamori Tsurumai Prefectural Natural Park
- Location: Chiba Prefecture, Japan
- Coordinates: 35°24′01″N 140°12′01″E
- Area: 19.48 km^{2} (7.52 sq mi)
- Established: 8 March 1966

Kasamori Tsurumai Prefectural Natural Park (県立笠森鶴舞自然公園, Kenritsu Kasamori Tsurumai shizen kōen) is a Prefectural Natural Park in central Chiba Prefecture, Japan. Established in 1966, the park spans the municipalities of Chōnan, Ichihara, and Nagara. Kasamori-dera is on the Bandō 33 Kannon pilgrimage route; its Kannon Hall is an Important Cultural Property dating to 1597 and related woodlands are a Natural Monument.

== See also ==
- National Parks of Japan
