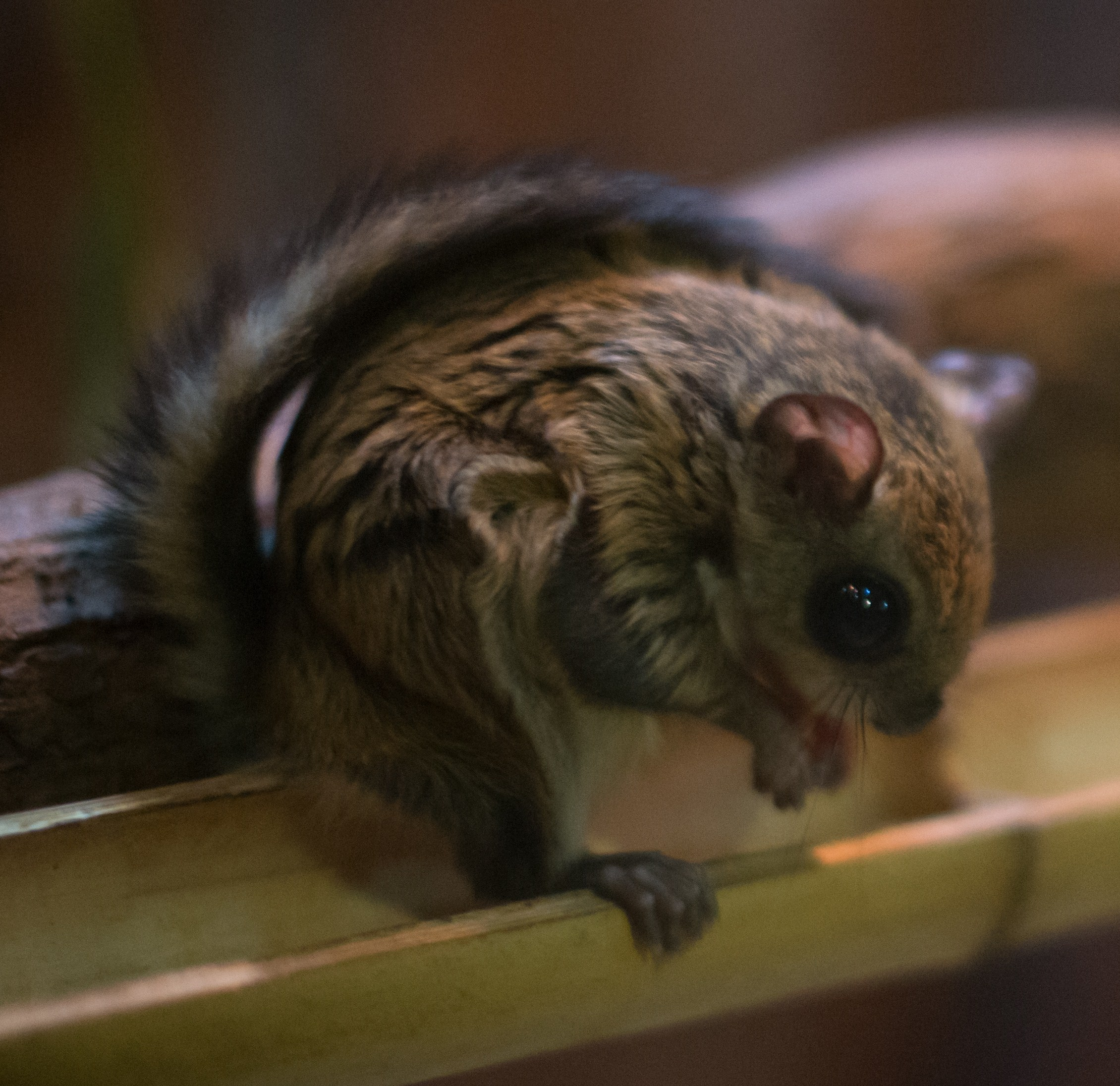

Conservation status
- Least Concern (IUCN 3.1)

Scientific classification
- Kingdom: Animalia
- Phylum: Chordata
- Class: Mammalia
- Order: Rodentia
- Family: Sciuridae
- Genus: Pteromys
- Species: P. momonga

Binomial name
- Pteromys momonga Temminck, 1844

= Japanese dwarf flying squirrel =

Species of rodent

The Japanese dwarf flying squirrel (Pteromys momonga; Japanese: ニホンモモンガ, Hepburn: Nihon momonga) is one of two species of Old World flying squirrels in the genus Pteromys. During the day, this squirrel hides in a hole, usually in a coniferous tree, emerging at night to feed.

== Taxonomy ==
Japanese dwarf flying squirrels have evolved differently from other Sciuridae. The differences between Japanese dwarf flying squirrels and other Sciuridae is evident when comparing morphology of the mandible and genetic code. The mandible of the Japanese dwarf flying squirrel does not have a coronoid process unlike the American dwarf squirrels (Microsciurus). The marmots (Marmota) also have a more elongated mandible than the Japanese dwarf flying squirrel. This is due to phylogeny and ecology. There are also large differences in chromosome structure between P. momonga and the only other member of the genus Pteromys, Pteromys volans. Though they have the same number of chromosomes (2n=38), their karyotypes differ extensively due to pericentric inversions, tandem fusions, and deletion of large segments of the autosomes and the Y chromosome. Because of these deletions, the P. volans genome contains about fifteen percent less DNA than P. momonga. These findings suggest that the karyotype of P. momonga more closely resembles the ancestor of P. volans and P. momonga.

== Description ==
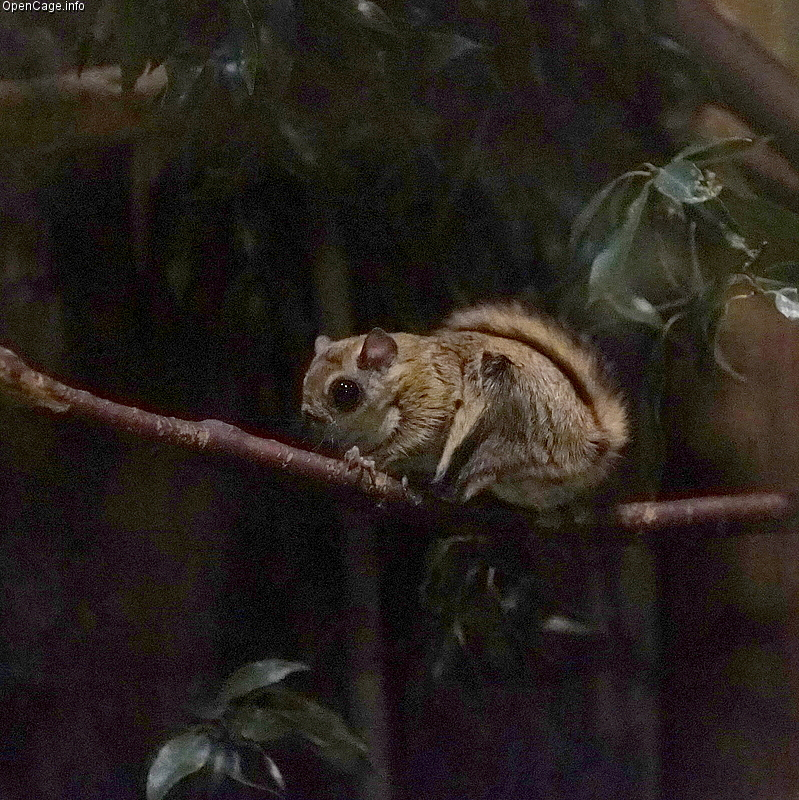
Pteromys momonga in Ueno Zoo

Its body is 14–20 centimetres (5.5–7.9 in) long and the tail length is 10–14 centimetres (3.9–5.5 in). It weighs 150–220 grams (5.3–7.8 oz). It is much smaller than the Japanese giant flying squirrel, which can reach 1,500 grams (53 oz). Its back is covered with grey brown hair, and its belly is white. It has large eyes and a flattened tail. Species of flying squirrels possess a patagium, which is a skin membrane used in gliding from tree to tree. In this particular species of flying squirrel, their patagium spans between their wrists and ankles, but not between their legs and tail.

== Distribution and habitat ==
This species of flying squirrel inhabits sub-alpine forests and boreal evergreen forests in Japan, specifically on Honshu and Kyushu islands as well as Shikoku. Japanese dwarf flying squirrels make their nests in the cavities of trees or at the cross point between branches and tree trunks. These squirrels also tend to line their nests with mosses and lichens. Tree cavities are very important nest resources for them. They tend to nest in conifers, such as pine and spruce, more than broad-leaved trees.

== Behavior ==
=== Feeding ===
The Japanese dwarf flying squirrel is nocturnal, and during the day it rests in holes in trees. It eats seeds, fruit, tree leaves, buds and bark. It can leap from tree to tree using a gliding membrane called its patagium. The patagium works as a wingsuit enabling it to maneuver and glide through the air.

When it feeds, the Japanese dwarf flying squirrel assumes a hanging posture. It will pull a twig to its mouth with its forepaws if the twig is not strong enough to support its weight and obtain food at the tip. While picking up food scattered on the ground, it will extend its body in an intermediate range around its body without moving its hind legs.

=== Sociality ===
Multiple individuals of this species can be found grouped together on a single tree; however, usually these individuals tend to be of the same sex when it is not mating season. Mating nests are usually shared by one breeding pair.

=== Reproduction ===
Not much is known about the specific mating rituals of these squirrels. The squirrels tend to mate twice a year between the months of May and July, with a gestation period of around four weeks. The average litter size is two to three young, but there can be up to five pups in a litter. They are thought to develop similarly to that of other flying squirrels, and are weaned by around six weeks of age.

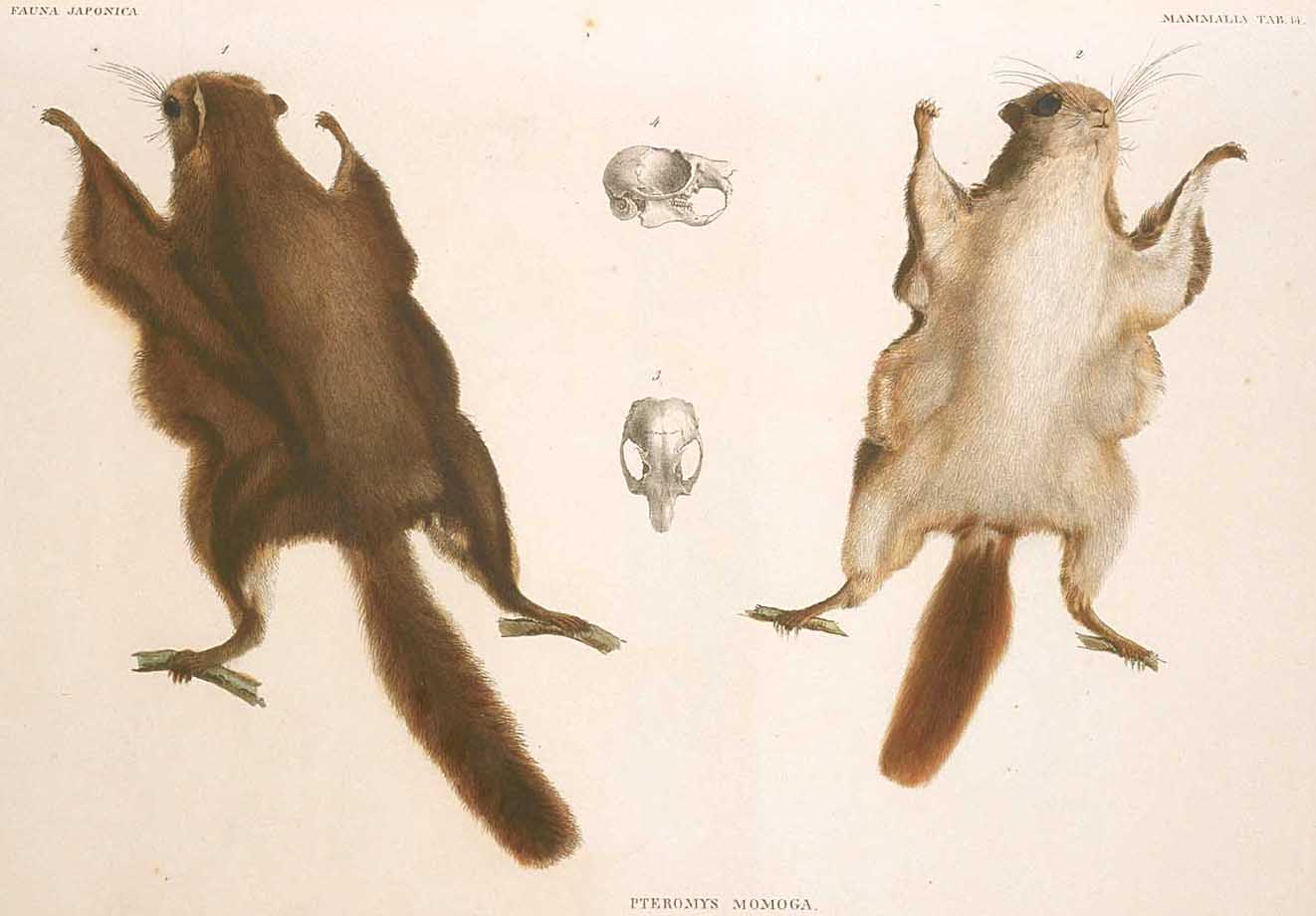
Illustration of Pteromys momonga from Fauna Japonica

== Conservation ==
They have an unknown population trend and number of mature individuals. The IUCN has not detected any major threats to this species. The Japanese dwarf flying squirrel is found in some protected areas, has a wide range, and is relatively common. The International Union for Conservation of Nature lists it as a "least-concern species".

== In human culture ==
"Momonga" (Japanese: モモンガ, lit. 'Flying squirrel') from Chiikawa is said to be based on the flying squirrel.
