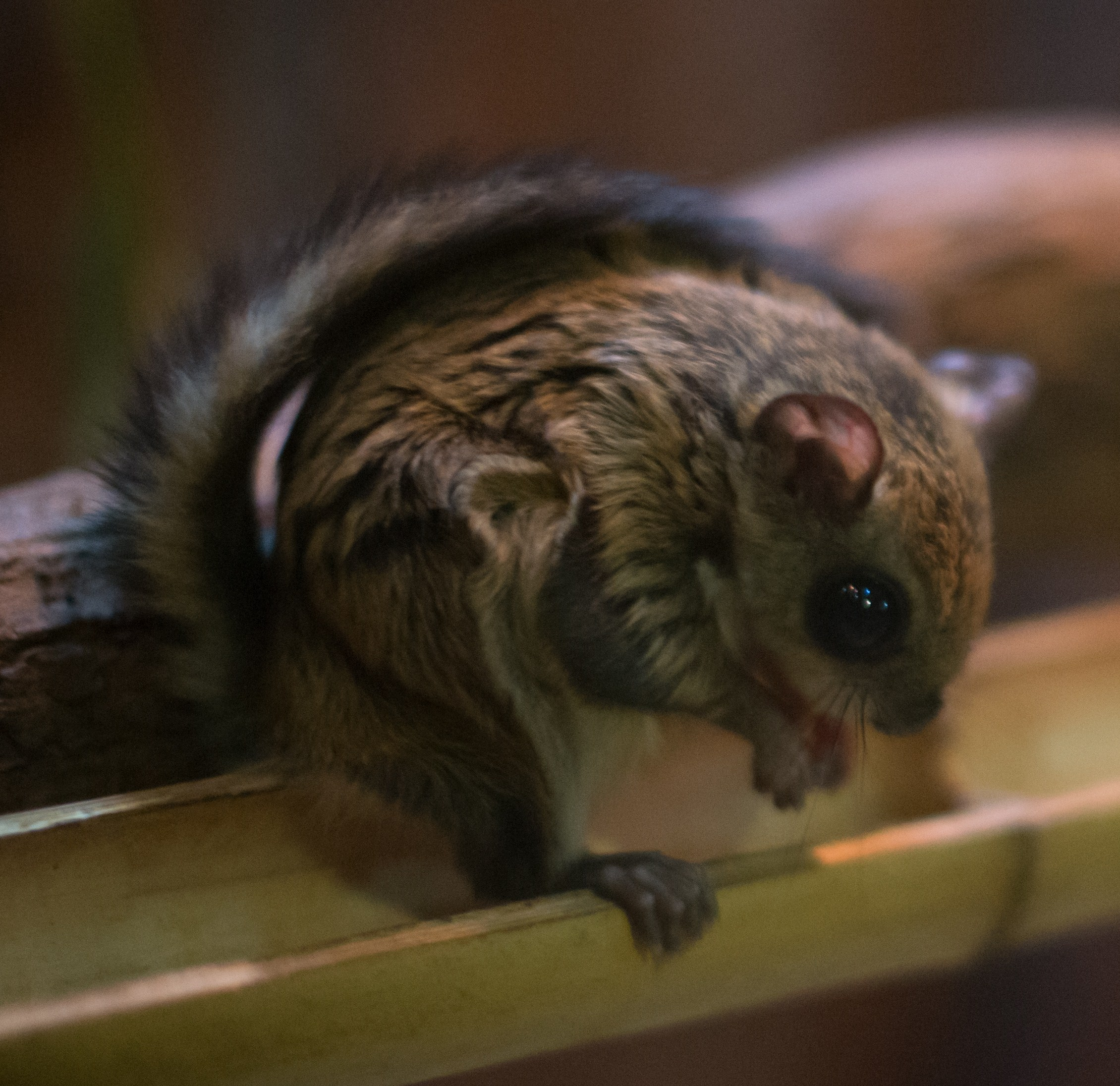
- Japanese dwarf flying squirrel, (Pteromys momonga)

Scientific classification
- Domain: Eukaryota
- Kingdom: Animalia
- Phylum: Chordata
- Class: Mammalia
- Order: Rodentia
- Family: Sciuridae
- Tribe: Pteromyini
- Genus: Pteromys; G. Cuvier, 1800

Type species
- Sciurus volans Linnaeus, 1758

Species
- Pteromys volans Pteromys momonga

= Old World flying squirrel =

Old World flying squirrels Temporal range: Late Pliocene – Recent

Genus of rodents

Commonly referred to as the Old World flying squirrels, the genus Pteromys is distributed across temperate Eurasia, the Korean Peninsula and Japan. Although there are a host of flying squirrel genera in Asia (particularly southern Asia), Pteromys is the only one present in Europe.

== Characteristics ==
These large-eyed animals are nocturnal and use a membrane stretching from their wrists to ankles in order to glide from tree to tree. They can glide up to 443 feet (135 m) and have a long flat tail. They feed on nuts, seeds, fruit, buds, bark, and insects.

== Species ==
There are two species in this genus:

- Pteromys momonga – Japanese dwarf flying squirrel – Found in Japan (Honshu and Kyushu).
- Pteromys volans – Siberian flying squirrel – Found in northern Europe (mainly Russia and Finland, some isolated populations in the Baltics) and northern Asia from Siberia to Hokkaido
