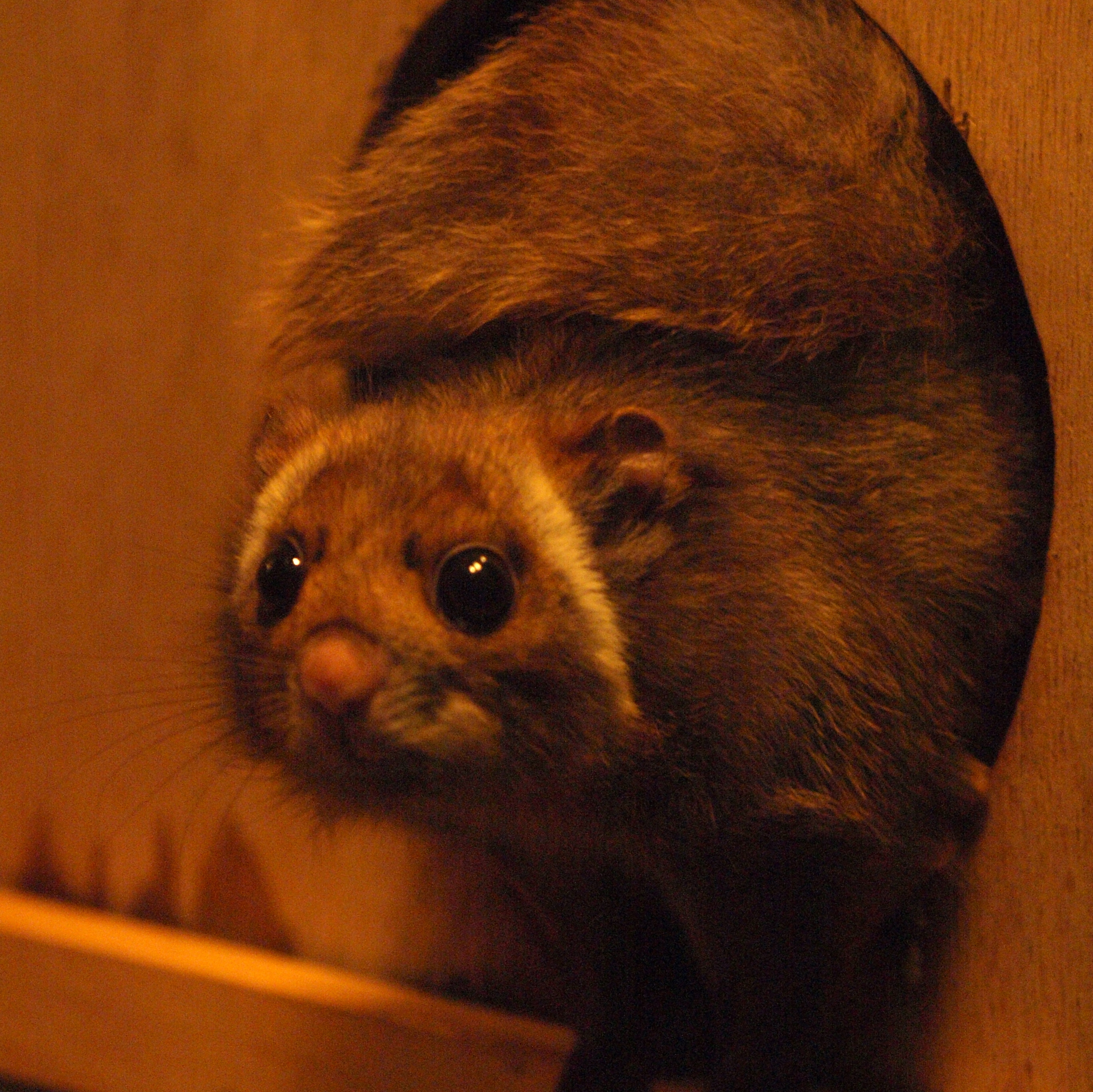

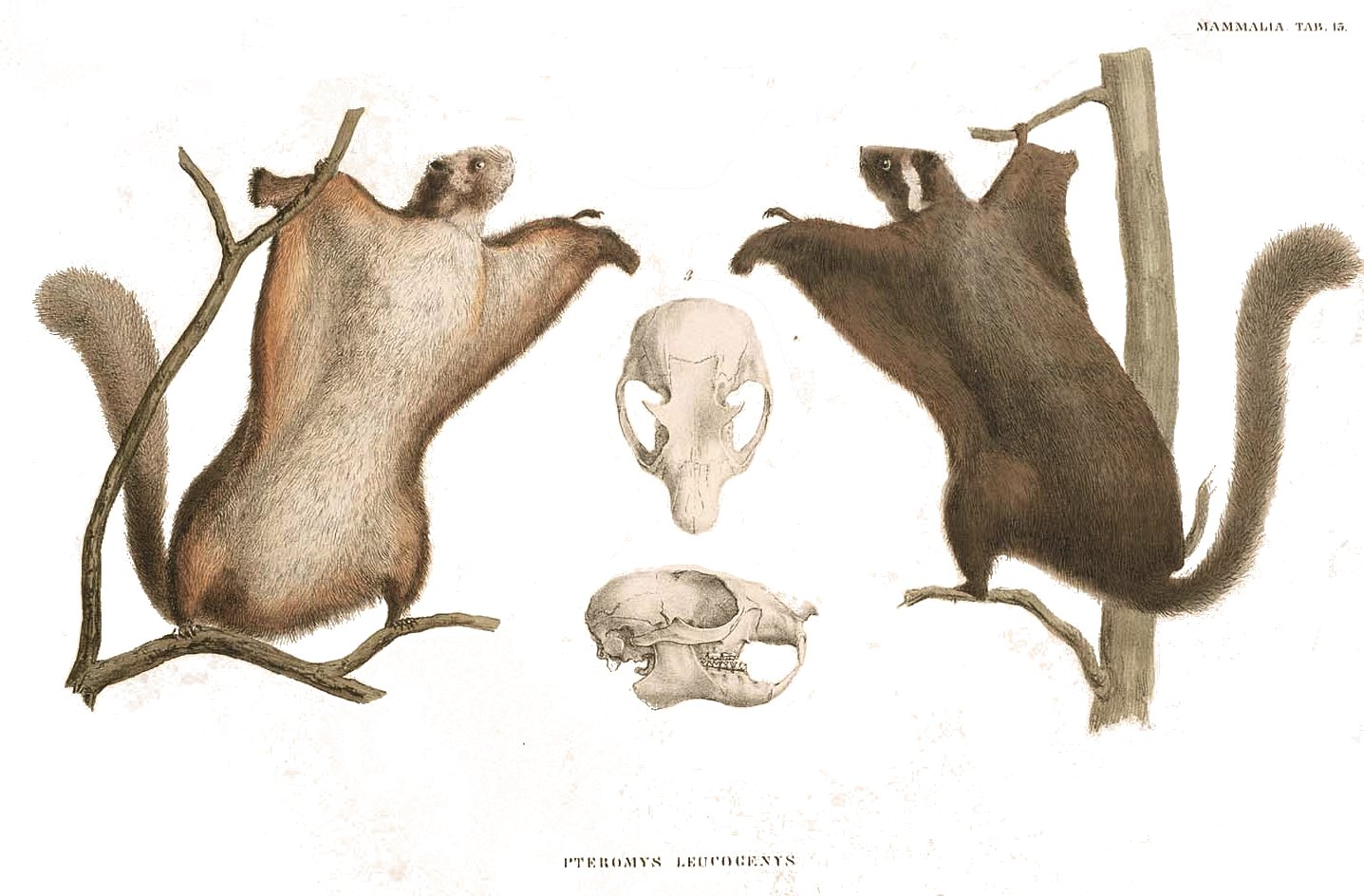

Conservation status
- Least Concern (IUCN 3.1)

Scientific classification
- Kingdom: Animalia
- Phylum: Chordata
- Class: Mammalia
- Order: Rodentia
- Family: Sciuridae
- Genus: Petaurista
- Species: P. leucogenys

Binomial name
- Petaurista leucogenys Temminck, 1827
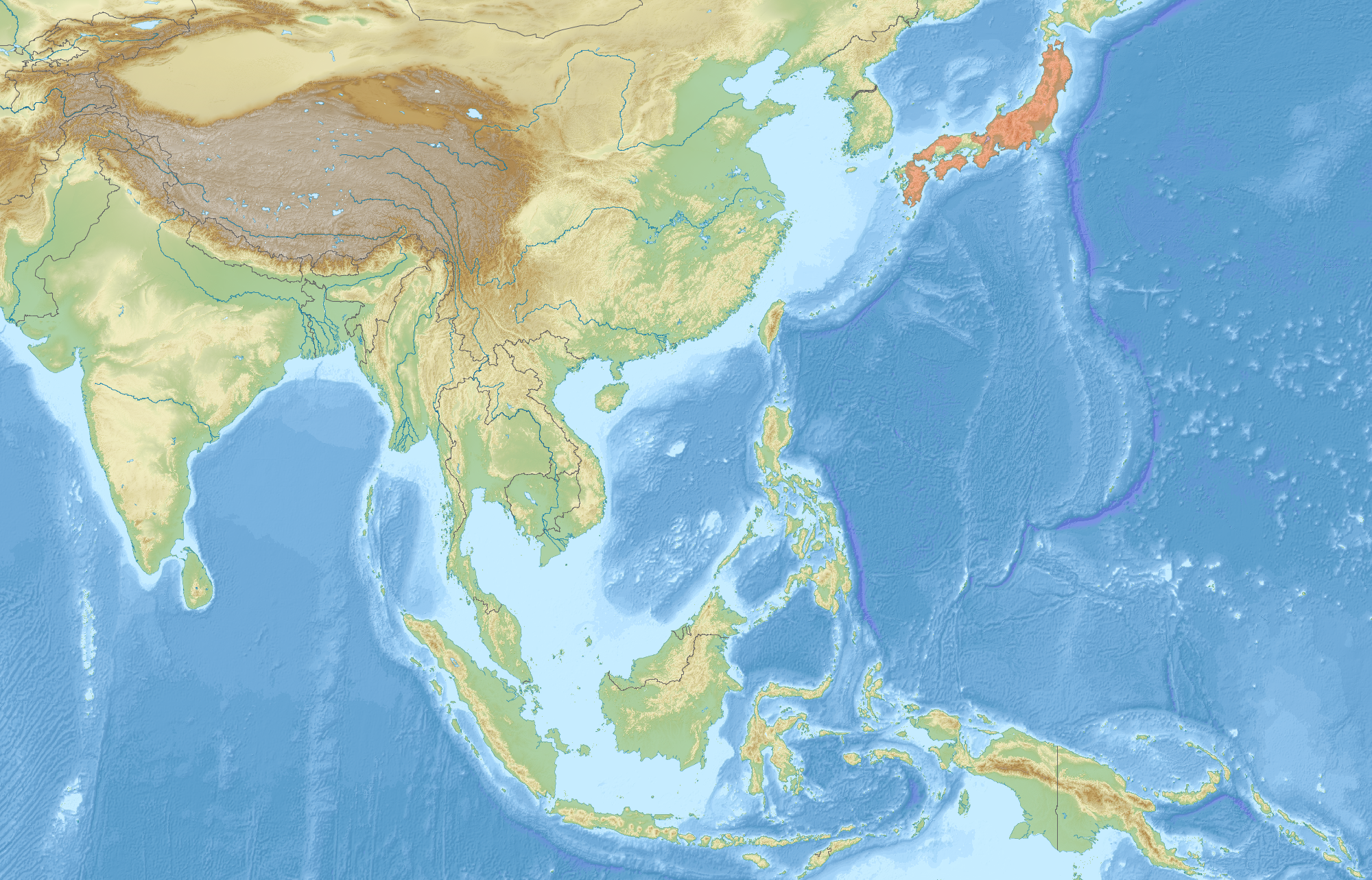
- Range in red

= Japanese giant flying squirrel =

Species of rodent

The Japanese giant flying squirrel (ムササビ, musasabi; Petaurista leucogenys) is a species of flying squirrel, one of the giant flying squirrels in the genus Petaurista.

== Description ==
Like other flying squirrels, it has a web of skin between its legs which it uses to glide between trees. Glides of 160 metres (520 ft) have been recorded. The tail is used for stability during flight. The body is about 25–50 cm (9.8–19.7 in) long, and the tail a further 30–40 cm (12–16 in). It weighs between 700 and 1,500 g (25 and 53 oz). It is much larger than the related Japanese dwarf flying squirrel which does not exceed 220 g (7.8 oz). It eats fruit and nuts and lives in holes in large trees. The female has a home range of about a 1 hectare (2.5 acres) and the male about two hectares (4.9 acres).

== Distribution and habitat ==
It is native to Japan, where it inhabits sub-alpine forests and boreal evergreen forests on the islands of Honshu, Shikoku and Kyushu.

== Reproduction ==
Sexual maturity is reached after about two years. From winter to early summer the males compete for females. During mating, after ejaculation, the male produces a sticky protein called a coitus plug from his penis which becomes firm and blocks the female's vagina. This may stop semen from leaking out and heighten the chances of fertilization. It also prevents other males from mating with the same female. However males can use their penis to remove the coitus plug. Gestation lasts about 74 days and one or two young are born in early autumn.
