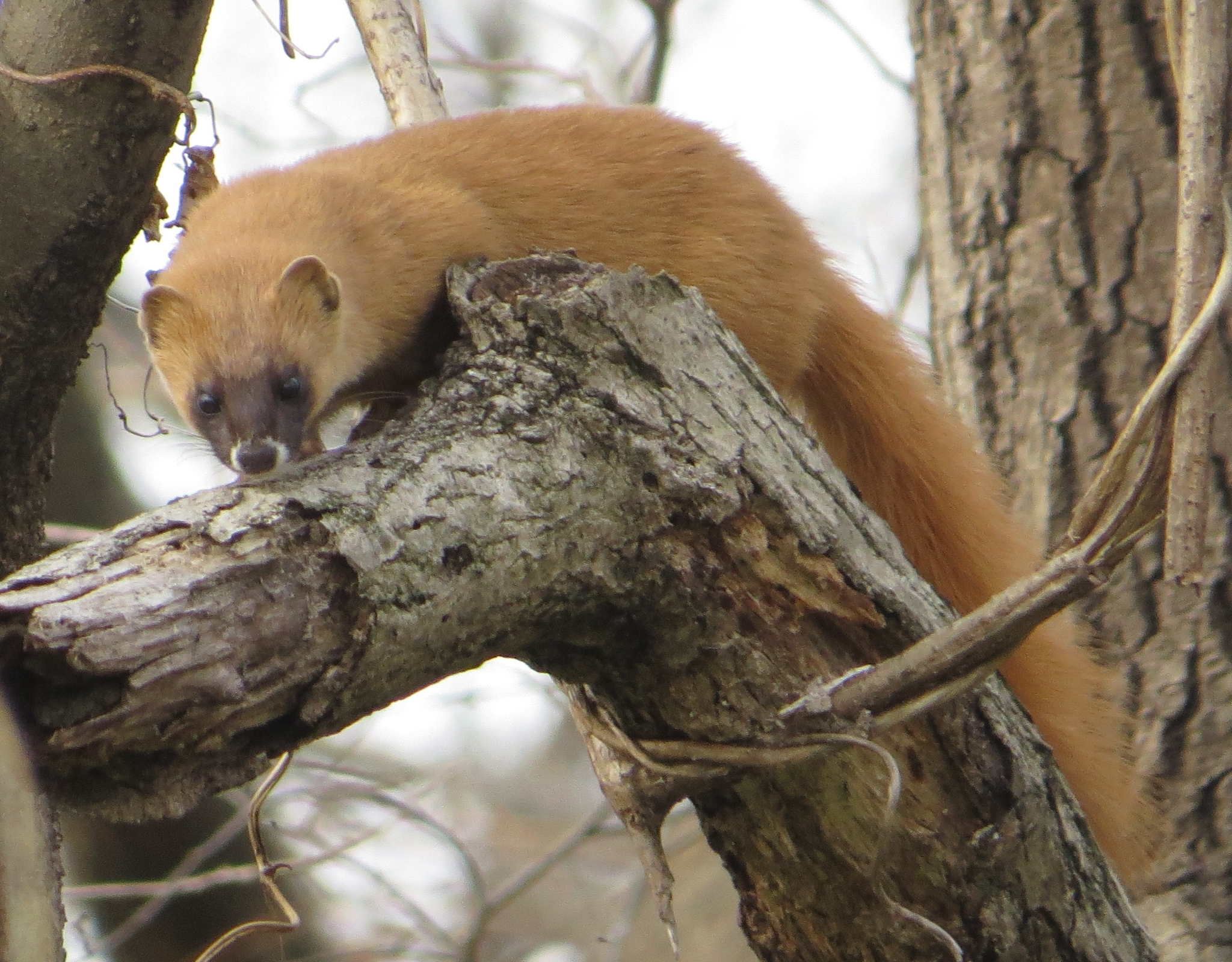

Conservation status
- Near Threatened (IUCN 3.1)

Scientific classification
- Kingdom: Animalia
- Phylum: Chordata
- Class: Mammalia
- Order: Carnivora
- Family: Mustelidae
- Genus: Mustela
- Species: M. itatsi

Binomial name
- Mustela itatsi Temminck, 1844
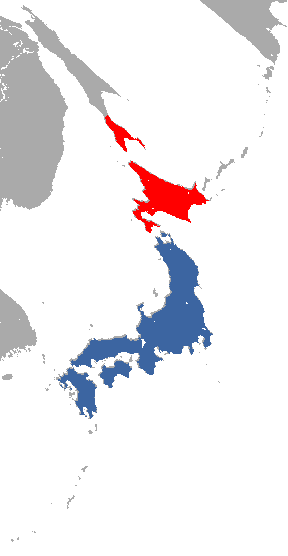
- Japanese weasel range (blue - native, red - introduced)

= Japanese weasel =

Species of carnivore

The Japanese weasel (Mustela itatsi) is a carnivorous mammal belonging to the genus Mustela in the family Mustelidae. The most closely related Mustela species is the Siberian weasel (Mustela sibirica). Its taxonomic species name, itatsi, is based on the Japanese word for weasel, itachi (イタチ). It is native to Japan where it occurs on the islands of Honshū, Kyūshū and Shikoku. It has been introduced to Hokkaidō and the Ryukyu Islands to control rodents and has also been introduced to Sakhalin Island in Russia.

It has an orange-brown coloured fur coat with darker markings on the head and varies in size depending on its gender. They have a long slender body, a long tail, relatively short legs and sharp claws. It is often confused with the Siberian weasel which has a different ratio of tail to head and body length. Unlike other species of weasels, their coat does not change colour in winter. Average lifespan of a Japanese weasel is highly dependent on the availability of food and to a lesser extent other factors that affect its life. In the wild it can live for 2 to 3 years with the highest in the range living to about 5 years. The Japanese weasel has a tail ratio of 36–50% while the Siberian weasel has a ratio greater than 50%. The population of the Japanese weasel has seen a decline of 25% over the last 3 generations which has been used to justify its status as near threatened on the IUCN Red List. The government of Japan has prevented the hunting of female Japanese weasels as a measure to conserve the species.

It is often classified as a subspecies of the Siberian weasel (M. sibirica). The two species are very similar in appearance but differ in the ratio of tail length to head and body length. There are also genetic differences which suggest that the two diverged around 1.6–1.7 million years ago. Mitochondrial sequencing of the two species suggests that the two species diverged in the Early Pleistocene. Their ranges now overlap in western Japan where the Siberian weasel has been introduced.

Adult males of the Japanese weasel can reach 35 cm (14 in) in body length with a tail length of up to 17 cm (6.7 in). Females are smaller. The species typically occurs in mountainous or forested areas near water. Its diet includes mice, frogs, reptiles, insects and crayfish.

== Ecology ==
Japanese weasels are sexually dimorphic with the males weighing approximately three times that of females. Despite this, there is no significant observable difference of tail-ratios between the sexes. Both sexes are capable of creating a smelly excretion known as musk from an anal gland used to repel predators which is employed by rubbing this secretion on rocks, branches and other natural obstacles. They are sexually mature before they are a year old and give birth to four to five offspring. The offspring are weaned in 8 weeks.

Japanese weasels have been responsible for the protection of tree saplings in winter as they hunt the rodents that chew on the roots when hibernating snakes and owls can't control the rodent population.

=== Diet ===
The diet of the Japanese weasel involves a mix of animals including mice, reptiles, crayfish, and frogs. They eat some non-meat food such as berries, seeds, and fruits, but generally only when hungry. Additionally, there is a difference between the diets of males and females due to their sexual dimorphism. Males tend to eat more mammals and crustaceans while females tend to eat a more varied diet of insects, fruit and earthworms. Their stomachs can only hold 10–20 grams (0.4–0.7 oz) of food and as small rodents weigh 15–30 grams (0.5–1 oz), Japanese weasels cannot eat more than one small rodent in a sitting.

Their diet changes depending on the season and the scarcity and availability of certain foods. Fish and insects constitute a part of their diet throughout all seasons. However, seasonal change means that the most consumed food seasonally is coleoptera insects in spring, fruits in summer, orthoptera insects and crustaceans in autumn, and fish and fruit in winter.

One of the dangers of urbanization to Japanese weasels is their intolerance of artificial food.

=== Temperament ===
Japanese weasels live a solitary life and as they are prey to numerous species, cautious behaviors can be observed in the weasel. The only situations that force them to leave their solitary lifestyle is cases of mating and mothers feeding their young. Their temperament and activity is largely controlled by a balancing of several essential needs: finding food, maintaining their metabolism, avoiding harsh weather and predators, finding mates and feeding their young.

They move into open areas with great care and live in dens within logs, and tree stumps. They react quickly when they believe they are in danger and quickly dash to safety. Their dens are lined with grass or feathers and are known to store food in dedicated caches. Communication between weasels is achieved acoustically and chemically. Territory is decided by marking the earth with musk. Scent marks hold information that can be comprehended by other weasels about "sex, identity, social status, and breeding condition, but also the probable outcome of a confrontation." The calls and sounds made by a Japanese weasel are varied and include trills, screeches, hisses and barks. Each sound is used in different scenarios and circumstances, from indicating imminent danger, to comforting the young. The vision of Japanese weasels is unimpeded by the dark.

Japanese weasels have a polygynous mating system as, after copulation, the male often never sees the female again. The male hunts down the female by analyzing traces of her scent. Once the female is tracked down, hours or days of play biting occurs before the relatively brief act of copulation.

Like other species of weasels, Japanese weasels, particularly males are ferocious fighters. Despite this, they are capable of avoiding confrontation by retreating from areas where another weasel's scent remains.

== Hunting ==
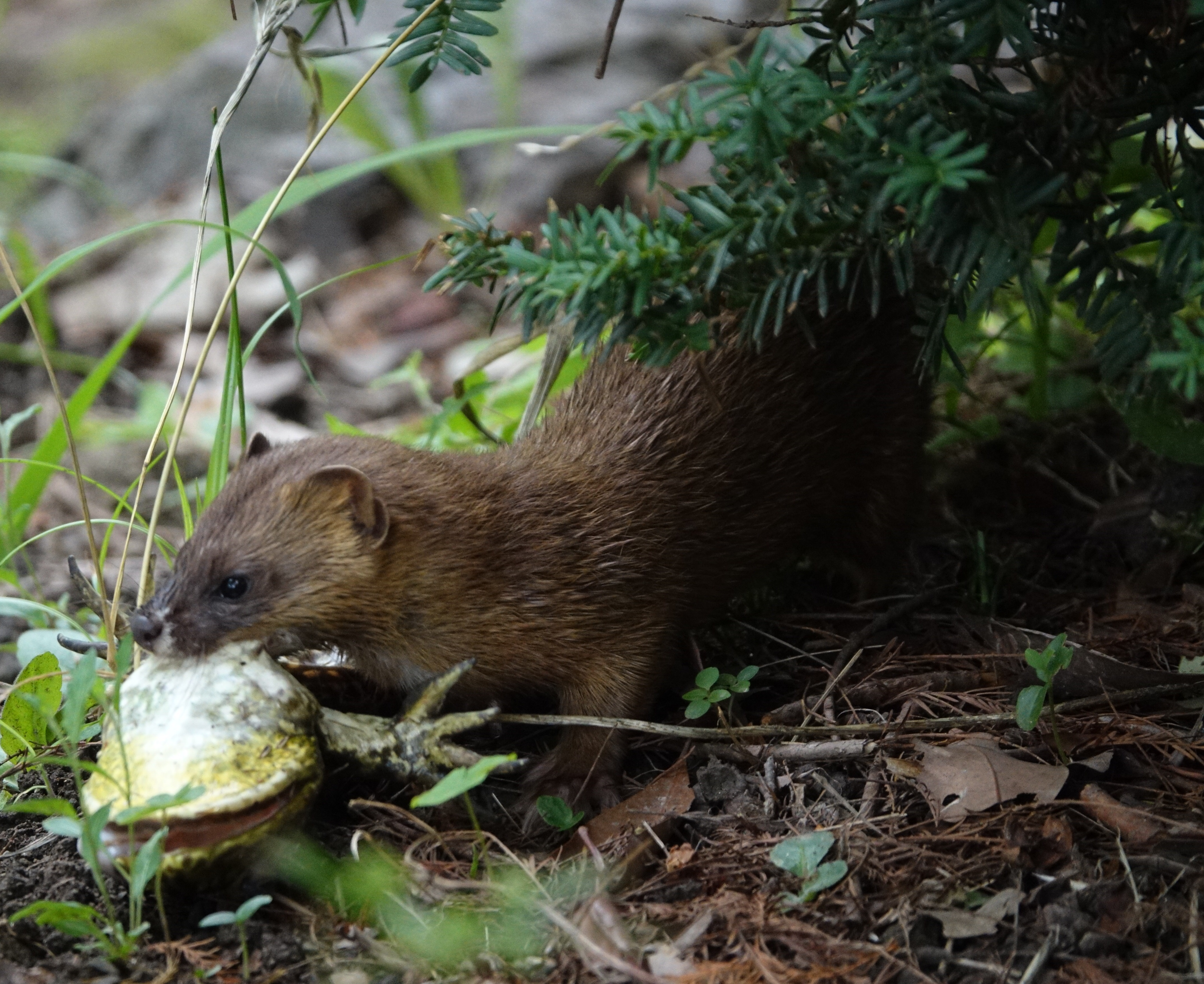
Japanese weasel (Mustela itatsi) with a frog it has hunted in its mouth

Weasels hunt regardless of whether it is day or night, instead, they hunt depending on their level of hunger. For Japanese weasels, hunting most often occurs along rivers though, at times, they enter suburban areas and grasslands to find prey.

Due to their high metabolism, weasels must constantly hunt to fulfill their energy needs. Japanese weasels, like other weasels, use their agility to their advantage as they are confident swimmers, climbers, runners and capable of reaching prey in hard to reach places. The use of their long body to aid their hunting as they wrap their body around prey to suppress its struggle. Additionally, the prey can be reoriented within its bodily grip. Even after taking a deep bite into the prey, the Japanese weasel holds on for some time. The prey can be found by scent, vision or hearing though the kill is ultimately done by sight.

Japanese weasels investigate holes and cracks to hunt out smaller prey. Small prey such as mice are hunted by pierces to the brain and neck with their teeth and are also carried by the neck. Japanese weasels are prey to some larger animals. Foxes, martens, preying birds and domestic cats hunt Japanese weasels and pose a threat to their life. Despite this, Japanese weasels are known to hunt prey larger than them such as rabbits. Even as prey, rabbits pose a threat to weasels and are capable of kicking and dragging in defence. In snowy areas in winter, Japanese weasels chase rodents through tunnels in the snow, using their slender bodies to their advantage. After catching their prey, the weasels will often stay in their quarry's nest for a while to enjoy the warmth.

Caching is employed by Japanese weasels when they kill multiple prey within one session. This occurs when multiple prey are visible to weasels as their willingness to hunt is instantaneous and instinctual when prey enters their line of sight regardless of hunger levels. Japanese weasels maintain this supply of excess food in their cache, and this is done at a greater importance in winter as there are days when weather prevents hunting. Where there are chicken coops or other locations of extremely vulnerable prey, the supply of cached food can far exceed its dietary needs.

== Distribution and habitat ==
As they have thin fur and long bodies, the selection of a nest is important to Japanese weasels. There is variation between males and females in the way they select their nests as females require habitats with higher quality food than males. This is due to the need to feed both themselves and their offspring.

The Japanese weasel is found to inhabit grasslands, shrublands, forests and plantations. They are not affected greatly by altitude and have an upper elevation limit of 336 metres (1,000 ft). Of the forests they live in, they inhabit both natural and secondary forests. They are found widespread throughout Japan but have evacuated most of western Japan and lowlands which the introduced Siberian weasel has taken over as the dominant weasel.

The co-existence of villages and Japanese weasels pose a risk to the life of the weasel as many dead Japanese weasels are found to be killed on roads. Further, they are not typically found within big cities. They are not at all found within urban Tokyo. A decrease in human activity in rural areas leads to the return of Japanese weasels to that area. This was seen in the rural regions of Oita, Japan. The area that sees the greatest decline of Japanese weasels is western Japan.

== Vermin control ==
The Japanese weasel has been used by the governments of both Russia and Japan as an aid for vermin control.

In order to deal with Hokkaido's rat problem, the Japanese weasel was introduced to the island in the 1880s. In 1932 it was also introduced to southern Sakhalin Island in Russia however there are no reliable records on the current state of the Japanese weasel's population there since 1980.

The introduction of the species in some cases, especially Miyake Island has inadvertently affected population of Japanese bush warblers as they hunt eggs and chicks of the bird. Prior to the introduction of the Japanese weasel, predation towards the warbler rarely occurred. After introduction of the Japanese weasels, the survival rate of the warbler in nestling and incubation stages has been measured to be around 0.498 and 0.848.

As they prey on domesticated birds such as chickens they are seen as having a negative economic impact on humans.

== In Japanese culture ==
The Japanese weasel has been embedded in everyday Japanese vernacular. In Japanese itachi gokko ("weasel play") defines the vicious cycle of repeating the same message. The scent of their excreted musk gives rise to the saying itachi no saigo-pei ("the weasel's final fart"), which is used metaphorically to describe an extreme or desperate final measure. An individual who acts with bravado only when they have no formidable opponents can be labelled "itachi" or "weasel". Despite the everyday use of these phrases, they do not reflect the true temperament of Japanese weasel.

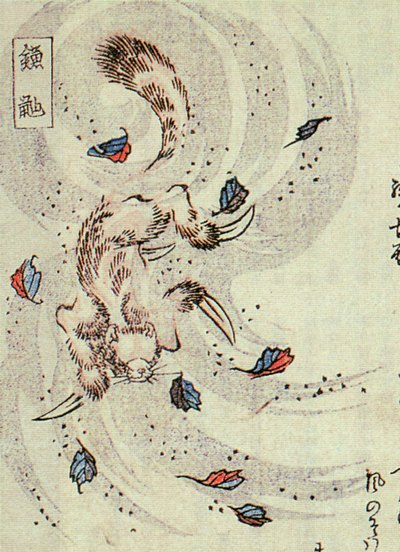
Artistic depiction of kamaitachi with sickle-like claws

=== Folklore ===
A countryside Japanese legend states that after reaching the age of 100, a Japanese weasel will transform into ten Japanese martens (Martes melampus).

Though not originally depicted as a weasel, the yokai to explain the phenomenon of cutting winds was eventually represented as a Japanese weasel. Named kamaitachi (鎌鼬), the yokai is depicted as having long, sharp nails similar in shape to sickles. It is a highly recognisable yokai found throughout Japan though most commonly in the snowy north of Honshu. The characterisation of the yokai varies slightly across Japan. For example, it is recognised as a trio of three weasels each with their own characteristic action. One to push over a victim, another that inflicts injury with a blade and the third which administers a healing salve.

The existence of kamaitachi has been accepted from as early as 1911 as the British Medical Journal reported on what was referred to as "Kamaitachi Disease" which was labelled as a spontaneous wound. The wound is described as crescent shaped and spontaneously appeared during thunderstorms as a result of temporary vacuum. (Y. Tanaka), writing for the British Medical Journal explains with the phenomenon that "...during thunderstorms a temporary vacuum may occur in places as a result of stray air currents, and if a part of the body comes into such a space a tear may result from the internal pressure unmodified by the action of external pressure."
