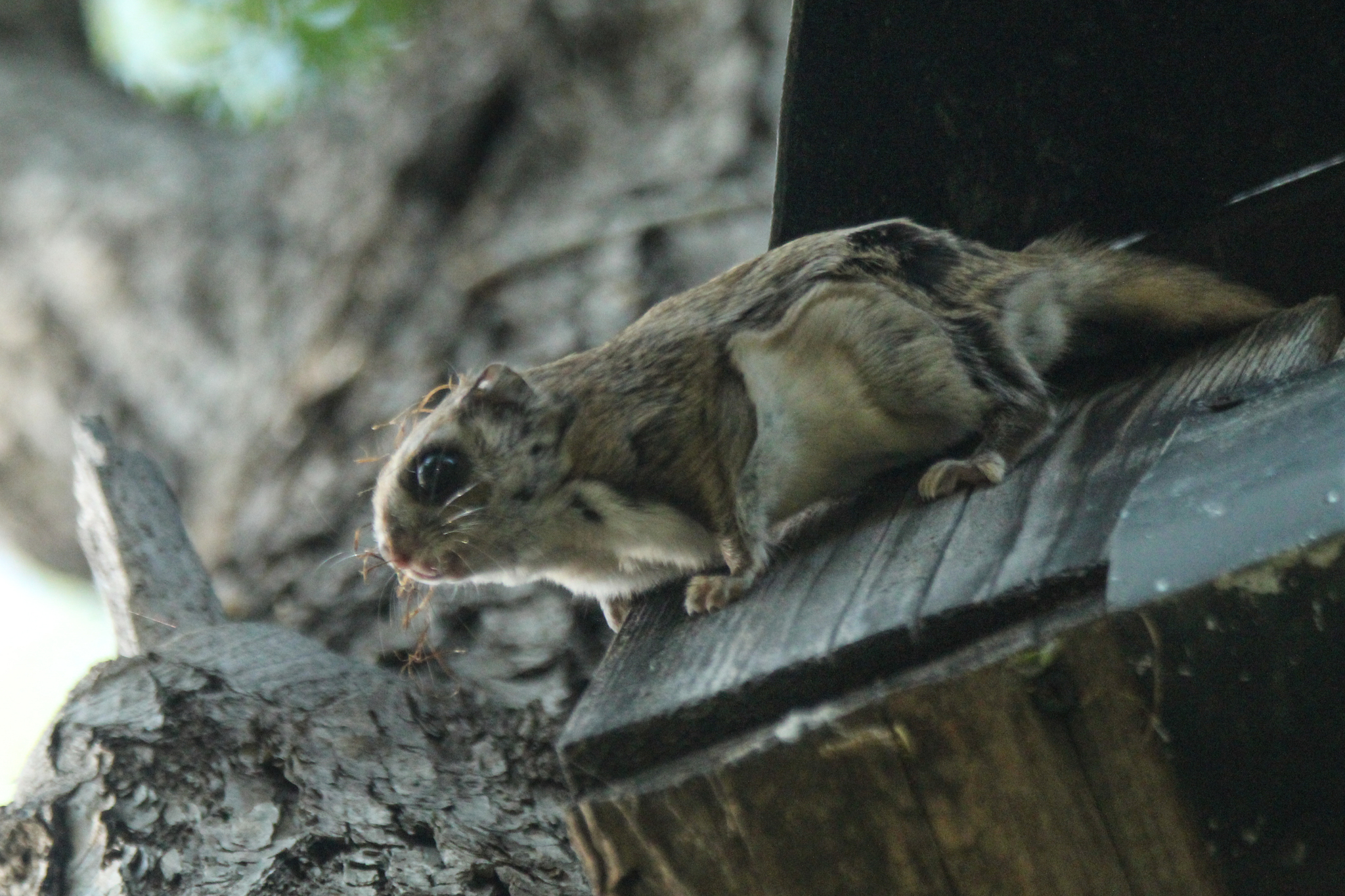
- in Primorsky Krai, Russia

Conservation status
- Least Concern (IUCN 3.1)

Scientific classification
- Kingdom: Animalia
- Phylum: Chordata
- Class: Mammalia
- Infraclass: Placentalia
- Order: Rodentia
- Family: Sciuridae
- Genus: Pteromys
- Species: P. volans

Binomial name
- Pteromys volans (Linnaeus, 1758)

Subspecies
- P. v. volans; P. v. athene; P. v. buechneri; P. v. orii
- Siberian flying squirrel range

Synonyms
- Sciurus volans Linnaeus, 1758

= Siberian flying squirrel =

Species of rodent

The Siberian flying squirrel (Pteromys volans) is an Old World flying squirrel ranging from the Baltic Sea in the west, throughout Northern Asia to the coast of the Pacific Ocean in the east. It is the only species of flying squirrel in Europe and is considered vulnerable in the European Union where it occurs only in Estonia and Finland. In Latvia, it was last sighted in 2001 and has been considered to be locally extinct since 2013.

== Description ==
A female Siberian flying squirrel weighs about 150 g (5.3 oz), the males being slightly smaller on average. The body is 13–20 cm (5.1–7.9 in) long, with a 9–14 cm (3.5–5.5 in) long flattened tail. The eyes are large and strikingly black. The coat is grey all over, the abdomen being slightly lighter than the back, with a black stripe between the neck and the forelimb. A distinctive feature of flying squirrels is the furry glide membrane or patagium, a flap of skin that stretches between the front and rear legs. By spreading this membrane the flying squirrel may glide from tree to tree across distances of over a hundred meters, and have been known to record a glide ratio of 3.31, but is normally 1-1.5.

== Distribution and habitat ==
The nominate subspecies, P. v. volans is widespread across the Palearctic realm, specifically in Northern Europe, Siberia and East Asia, while other subspecies have limited distribution, with P. v. athene in Sakhalin, P. v. buechneri in China and P. v. orii in Hokkaido.

== Behavior and ecology ==
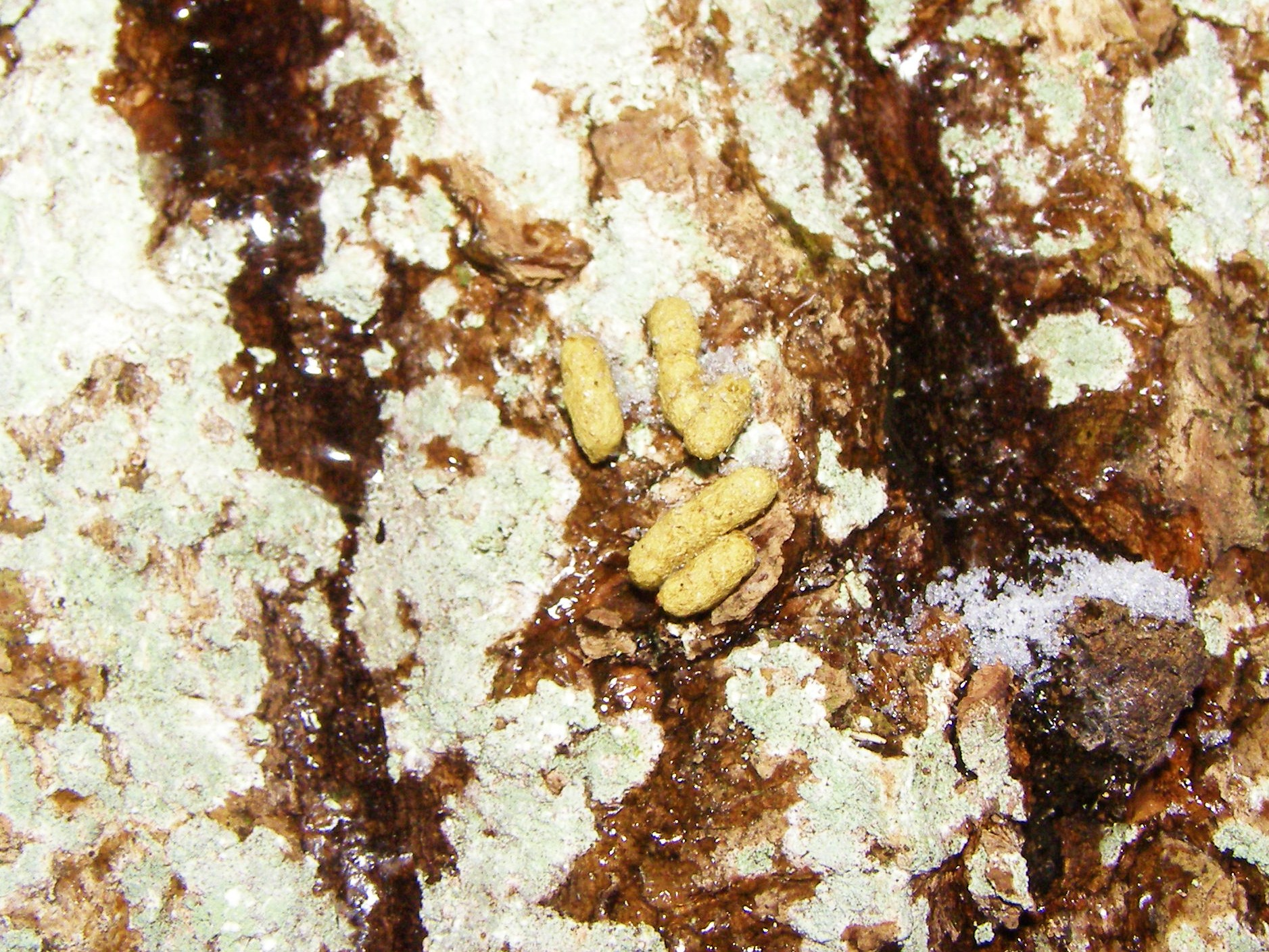
Feces of Siberian flying squirrel.

=== Diet ===
Its diet consists of leaves, seeds, cones, buds, sprouts, nuts and berries.

=== Reproduction ===
They mate early in the spring. In southern Finland the first mating season begins in late March, with a second mating season occurring in April. After a gestation period of five weeks, the female gives birth to a litter of usually two or three young, each weighing about 5 grams.

== In human culture ==
It is the emblem of Nuuksio National Park in Espoo municipality of Finland due to the density of the population in this region.

In Estonia, the Siberian flying squirrel is depicted on the logo of the Estonian Nature Fund.

== Threats ==
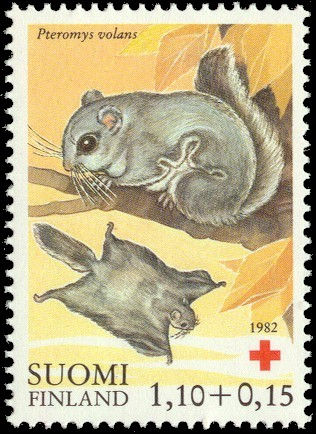
Finnish Postage stamp depicting Siberian Flying Squirrels

In Finland and especially the Baltic states, the Siberian flying squirrel has been at risk potentially becoming an endangered species. P. volans is already extirpated from Lithuania. Since 1996, it was also considered extinct in Belarus, until being spotted again in 2017, with more than 80 habitats subsequently discovered in far northern regions of the country in 2019. Acts that are believed to be contributors to the decrease in the population size are habitat fragmentation, climate, and habitat loss in places they reside like boreal forests and old-spruce-dominated forests. Because Finland is a member of the European Union, the squirrel is under the protection of the EU's 1992 Habitats Directive. The EU, Finland and Estonia have responded with a six-year, 8.9 million euro project to help protect the squirrel.
