= Broad-footed mole =

The broad-footed mole (Scapanus latimanus) was a former mole species that has since been split into three distinct species in the genus Scapanus:

- Northern broad-footed mole, Scapanus latimanus, ranging from southern Oregon to central California.
- Southern broad-footed mole, Scapanus occultus, ranging from southern California to northernmost Baja California, Mexico
- Mexican mole, Scapanus anthonyi, found in a small portion of the Sierra de San Pedro Mártir in Baja California, Mexico
