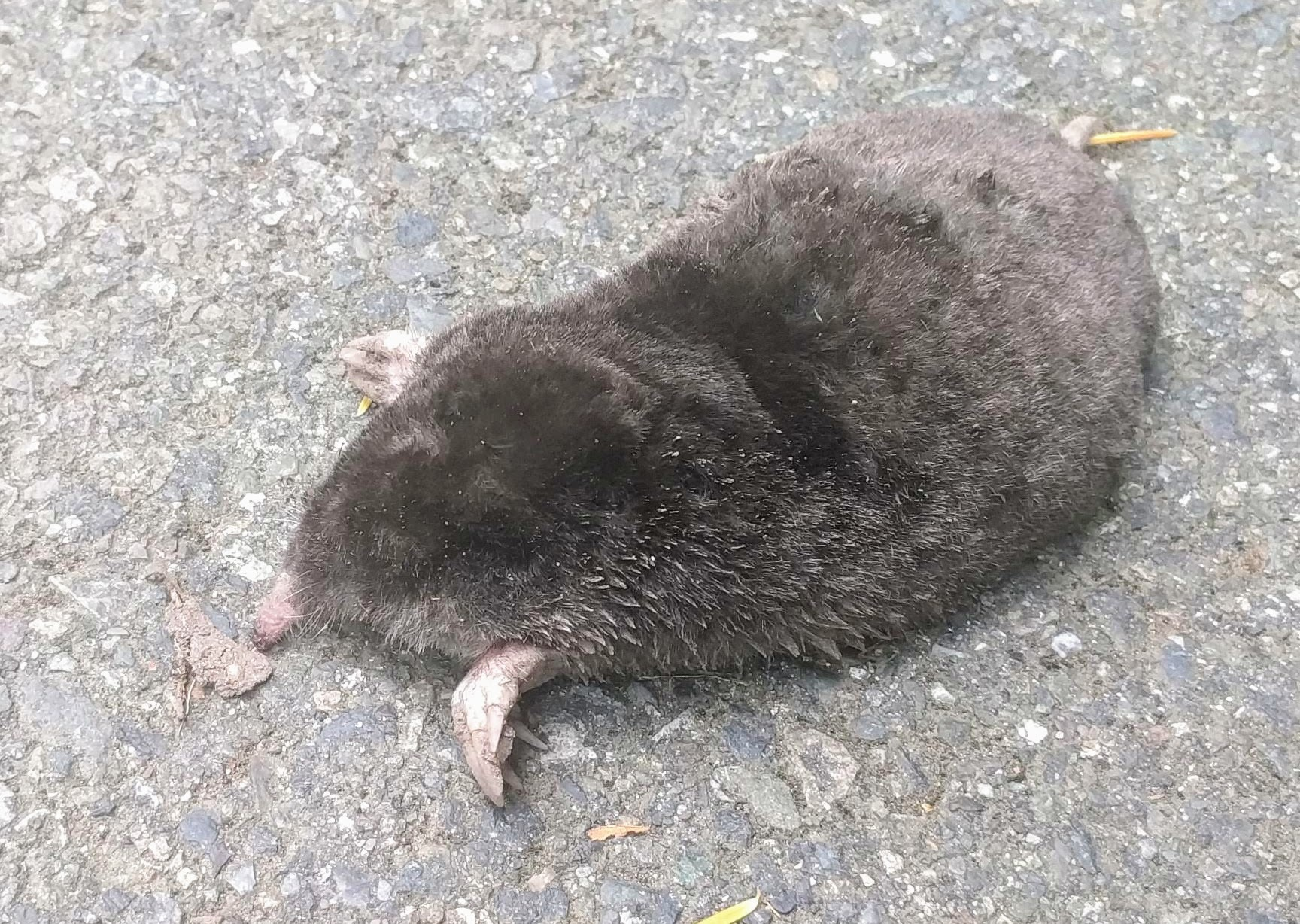
- Image of the type subspecies Scapanus townsendii townsendii

Scientific classification
- Kingdom: Animalia
- Phylum: Chordata
- Class: Mammalia
- Order: Eulipotyphla
- Family: Talpidae
- Genus: Scapanus
- Species: S. townsendii
- Subspecies: S. t. olympicus

Trinomial name
- Scapanus townsendii olympicus Johnson & Yates, 1980

= Olympic snow mole =

Subspecies of mammal

The Olympic snow mole (Scapanus townsendii olympicus) is a subspecies of Townsend's mole that inhabits subalpine meadows at minimum elevations of 1,000 meters in the Olympic Mountains of Washington State. Despite notable differences in size and range, there is very little genetic difference between S. t. olympicus and S. t. townsendii.

== Description ==
The Olympic snow mole is smaller than most individuals of the type subspecies, S. t. townsendii, but is larger than S. orarius. The holotype, the skin and skull of an adult female from an elevation of 1615 meters, had a total length of 197 mm and tail length of 41 mm, which is towards the lower end of the species, which ranges from 195-237 mm in total length and 34-51 mm in tail length. The mean proportions of the skull are smaller than that of the type subspecies in every aspect. It has 44 teeth, in the dental formula incisors 3/3, canines 1/1, premolars 4/4, and molars 3/3.

== Habitat ==
It is known to occur only at elevations from 4500-5500 feet or 1370-1675 meters on Hurricane Ridge within Olympic National Park. This region has a maritime climate, with mild, wet winters and cool, dry summers. There is heavy snowfall for most of the year, with snow cover appearing by late October and melting from July to August. This long period of snow cover is what gives it its common name. Its range seems to be entirely disjunct from the main subspecies, which occurs at altitudes below 2000 feet or 610 meters. It inhabits areas of deep, moist soil in open meadows, cirques, and ridge tops in subalpine meadows. The plant community is made up primarily of mesic grasses and tall sedges such as Carex albonigra, American bistort (Bistorta bistortoides), and subalpine lupine (Lupinus latifolius), with the dominant tree species being the subalpine fir (Abies lasiocarpa), found in stands at meadow edges. It has been recorded to live alongside coast moles (Scapanus orarius), Olympic marmots (Marmota olympus), creeping voles (Microtus oregoni), and Townsend's vole (Microtus townsendi).
