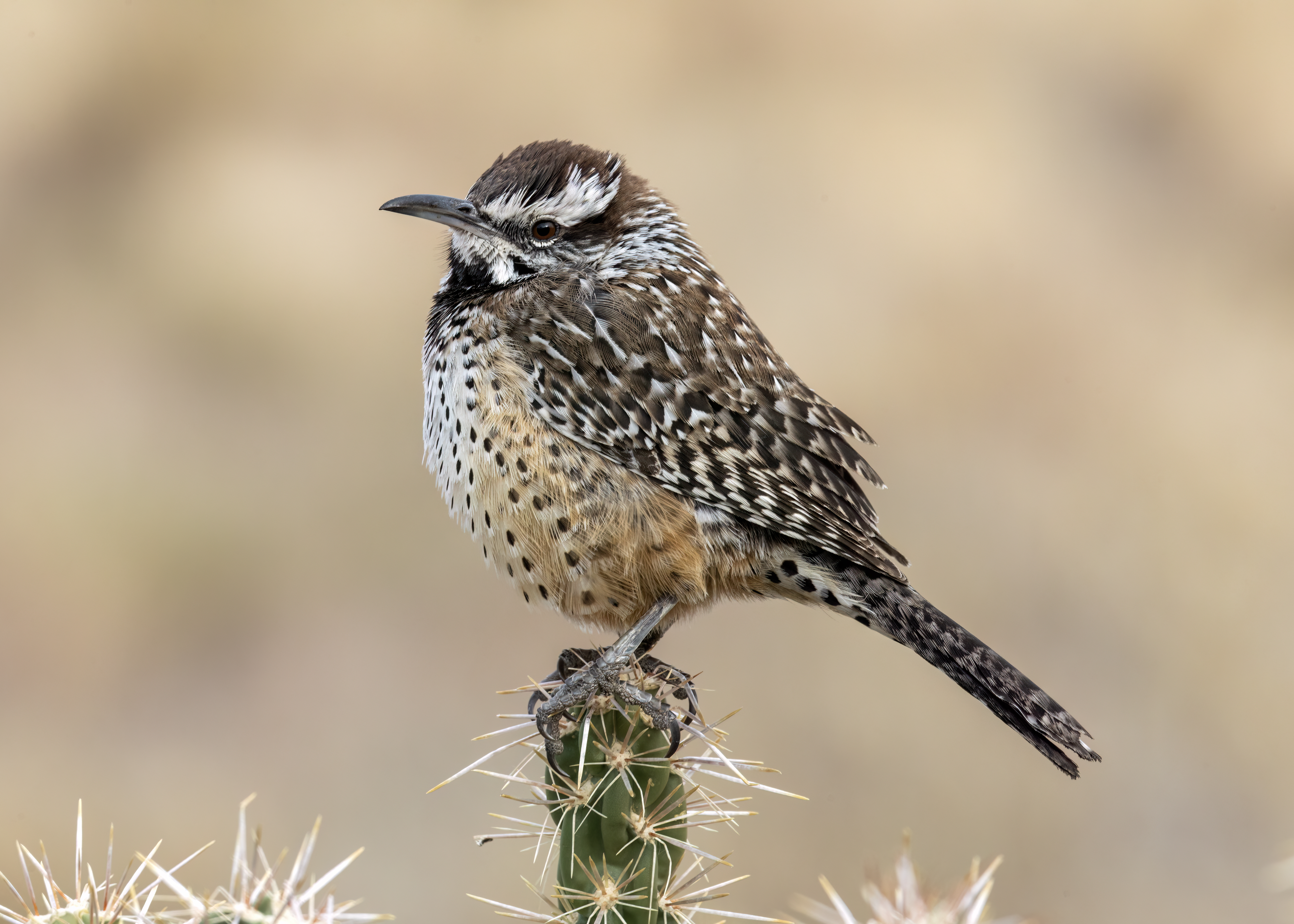

Conservation status
- Least Concern (IUCN 3.1)

Scientific classification
- Kingdom: Animalia
- Phylum: Chordata
- Class: Aves
- Order: Passeriformes
- Family: Troglodytidae
- Genus: Campylorhynchus
- Species: C. brunneicapillus

Binomial name
- Campylorhynchus brunneicapillus (Lafresnaye, 1835)

Subspecies
- C. b. brunneicapillus Lafresnaye, 1835; C. b. guttatus Gould, 1837; C. b. affinis Xántus, 1860; C. b. couesi Sharpe, 1881; C. b. bryanti Anthony, 1894; C. b. purus Van Rossem, 1930 (disputed); C. b. seri Van Rossem, 1932; C. b. sandiegensis Rea, 1986 (disputed)
- Range map of the cactus wren

Synonyms
- Picolaptes brunneicapillus Lafresnaye, 1835; Thyrothorus guttatus Gould, 1836; Campylorhynchus guttatus Lafresnaye, 1846; Heleodytes brunneicapillus AOU, 1894; Campylorhynchus brunneicapillum AOU, 1957

= Cactus wren =

Cactus wren Temporal range: 1–0 Ma

Species of bird found in North America

The cactus wren (Campylorhynchus brunneicapillus) is a species of wren that is endemic to the deserts of the southwestern United States and northern and central Mexico. It is the state bird of Arizona, and the largest wren in the United States. Its plumage is brown, with black and white spots as markings. It has a distinctive white eyebrow that sweeps to the nape of the neck. The chest is white, whereas the underparts are cinnamon-buff colored. Both sexes appear similar. The tail, as well as flight feathers, are barred in black and white. Their song is a loud raspy chirrup; akin in the description of some ornithologists to the sound of a car engine that will not start. It is well-adapted to its native desert environment, and the birds can meet their water needs from their diet which consists chiefly of insects, but also of some plant matter. The cactus wren is a poor flier and generally forages for food on the ground. Ornithologists generally recognize seven subspecies, with the exact taxonomy under dispute.

Its common name derives from their frequenting desert cactus plants such as the saguaro and cholla, building nests, roosting, and seeking protection from predators among them. Its bulky and globular nests are constructed of plant material and lined with feathers. They do not migrate; instead, they establish and defend the territories around their nests where they live all year-round. It lives in pairs, or as family groups from late spring through winter. Pairing among cactus wrens is monogamous; in each breeding season, the males chiefly build nests, the females incubate eggs, and both parents feed the young.

Populations have declined as the species faces threats related to human activities and habitat loss, although the species remains abundant. Habitat fragmentation and fire have been of particular concern, as the cactus wren is slow to disperse into new habitats. Introduced species have also hurt populations. Feral cats hunt many birds in urban settings, and invasive grasses take up valuable foraging space, reducing habitat size. Despite these threats, the cactus wren has proved adaptable. Cactus wrens have learned to coexist with humans effectively, using human materials and structures for nesting, and even learning to take insects from vehicle radiator grilles. The population still numbers in the millions, leading the International Union for Conservation of Nature to consider the cactus wren a species of least concern.

== Taxonomy and systematics ==
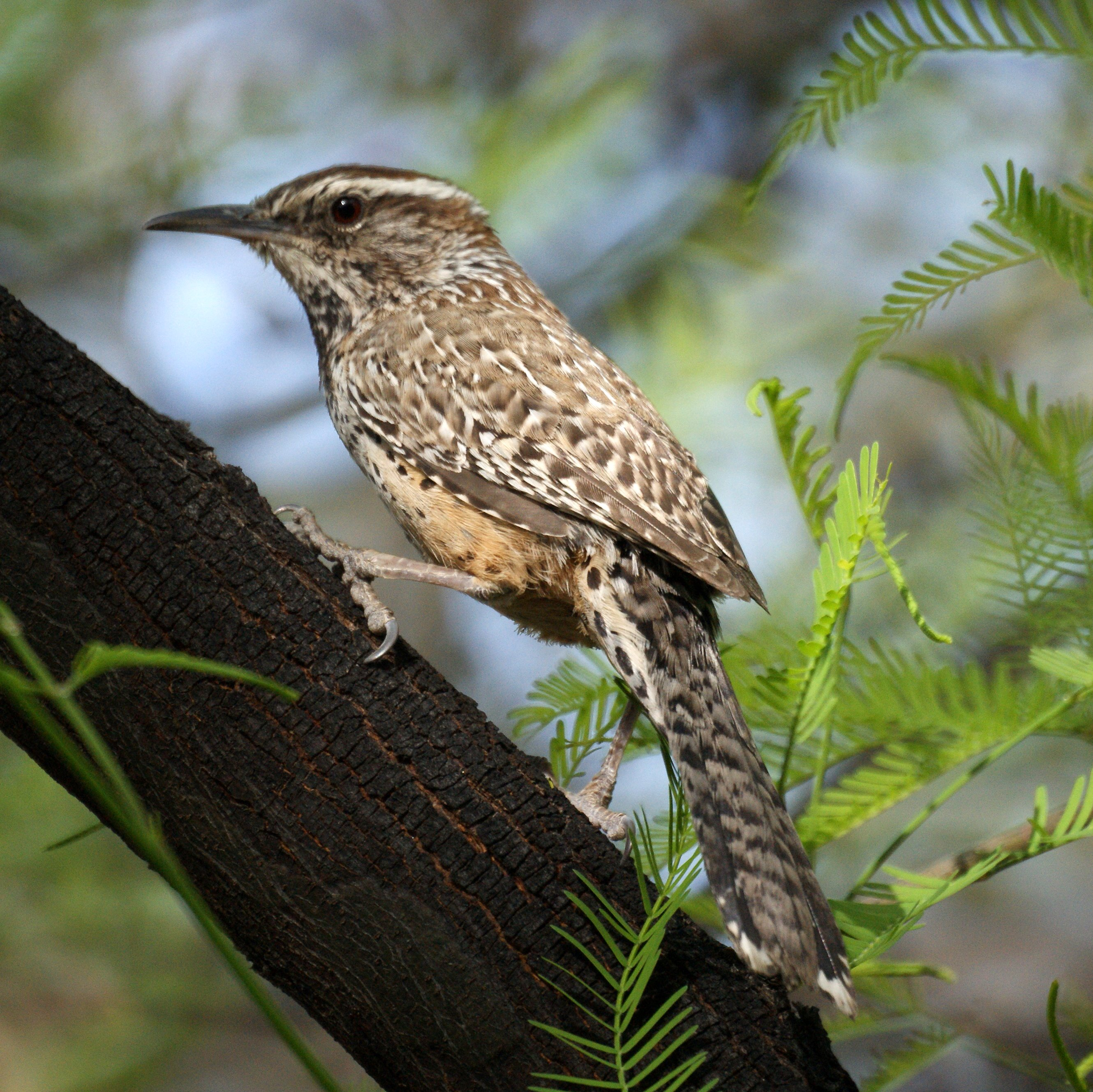
Adult perched in a honey mesquite tree

The wren family is a group of generally small passerine birds, found – with one exception – only in the New World. Although the cactus wren is the largest wren in the U.S., globally the title is shared between the giant wren and the bicolored wren. It was historically considered conspecific (of the same species) with the Yucatan wren and Boucard's wren, but there are numerous morphological and behavioral differences between the species. A 2007 genetic study by Barker indicated that all three were distinct species. Work on wren taxonomy in the 20th century postulated that the Yucatan, Boucard's, and cactus wrens – along with the spotted wren – might constitute a superspecies. The 2007 study showed this to be unlikely, as the cactus wren was found to be ancestral to the other species. Study of the evolution of the cactus wren suggests that it evolved in central Mexico about one million years ago and quickly spread to its modern range.

The first description of a cactus wren was in 1835 by ornithologist Frédéric de Lafresnaye. Lafresnaye was a Frenchman who never visited America; his specimen was gifted to him by ornithologist and businessman Charles Brelay. Brelay procured the specimen from a naval officer who had recently returned from California. It is likely that the bird was picked up at the port of Guaymas, in Sonora. However, Lafresnaye did not know that, and thought the specimen – which he called Picolaptes brunneicapillus – might have come from Peru (far outside the range of the wren), as the officer had stopped there on his journey. The unclear geographic origin contributed to much ensuing taxonomic confusion. Because the original description of the wren had been geographically imprecise, ornithologists described the cactus wren multiple times as different species; incorrect descriptions happened until as late as 1898. Subspecies were also incorrectly described as independent species. Matters were not helped by ornithologist John Gould, who described the cactus wren – as Thryothorus guttatus – independently in 1836 and also failed to say precisely where his specimen had come from. Lafresnaye renamed Gould's find Campylorhynchus guttatus in 1846, still not realizing they had described the same bird. Although ornithologist Spencer Baird suggested in 1864 that Lafresnaye and Gould's birds might be the same, Lafresnayes and Gould's separate descriptions continued to be used until 1945, when it was determined that they were different subspecies of the same bird. The cactus wren was placed in the genus Helodytes by the American Ornithologists' Union in 1894, but they returned it to Campylorhynchus in 1947.

The genus name Campylorhynchus is Greek, and roughly translates to 'curved beak'. The specific epithet brunneicapillus translates as 'brown hair', referring to the bird's brown head and back. The bird's common name comes from its frequent use of cacti as nesting sites, its association with cacti, as well as the use of cacti for perches, roosting, and seeking protection from predators.

The 2007 study by Barker established the relationships between the cactus wren and related wrens in the genus Campylorhynchus, including select subspecies. Those relations are summarized in the following cladogram:

- Campylorhynchus
  - - - - - - Veracruz wren (C. rufinucha)
            - Spotted wren (C. gularis)
          - Boucard's wren (C. jocosus)
        - - Bicolored wren (C. griseus)
          - Giant wren (C. chiapensis)
      - Yucatan wren (C. yucatanicus)
    - - Cactus wren (C. brunneicapillus)
  - - - Thrush-like wren (C. turdinus)
    - - Stripe-backed wren (C. nuchalis)
      - - - Band-backed wren (C. zonatus s.s. zonatus)
          - Gray-barred wren (C. megalopterus)
        - - Band-backed wren (C. zonatus s.s. vulcanius)
          - - Fasciated wren (C. fasciatus)
            - - White-headed wren (C. albobrunneus)

=== Subspecies ===
Various subspecies of the cactus wren have been described, and seven are generally recognized. The exact taxonomy of the cactus wren remains under debate, and not all subspecies are universally recognized. Ornithologists Anders and Anne Anderson, in their compendium of 40 years of cactus wren research published in 1973, recognize seven subspecies and do not classify C. b. sandiegensis as an independent subspecies. The International Ornithologists' Union recognizes seven subspecies – including C. b. sandiegensis – but does not recognize C. b. purus. Below are all proposed subspecies:

- C. b. brunneicapillus (Lafresnaye, 1835) – the nominate subspecies. Its range is northern Mexico in the states of Sonora and Sinaloa. Its distinction from other subspecies is enhanced by its pure white chin.
- C. b. guttatus (Gould, 1836) – found in central and southern Mexico. It is duller and more gray than the nominate subspecies; its upper parts also have less noticeable white markings. Guttatus means 'speckled' in Latin.

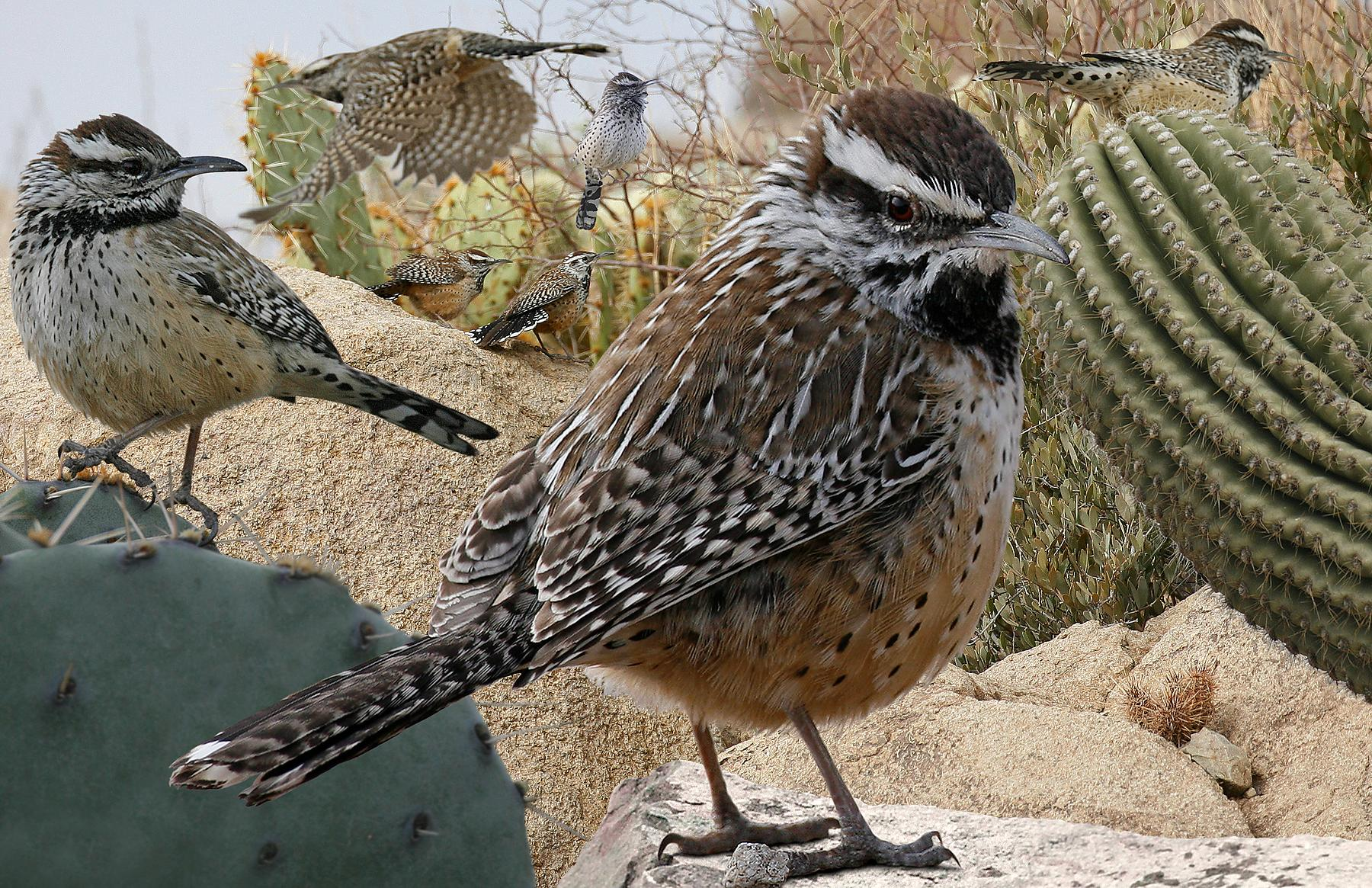
Composite image showing key identifying features: distinctive white eyebrows, barred feathers, and cinnamon-buff underparts

- C. b. affinis (Xántus, 1860) – found in southern Baja California. Its underparts are paler, and it has fewer black marks than the nominate subspecies. Its rectrices (tail flight feathers), excluding the middle pair, have white bars. C. b. affinis tends to lay fewer eggs than other subspecies, generally two at a time instead of the more typical three to five, and its eggs are notably paler than those of other subspecies. Affinis means 'allied' or 'related' in Latin.
- C. b. couesi (Sharpe, 1882) – covers most of the cactus wren's range in the southern United States, including Nevada, Utah, Arizona, New Mexico, and Texas, as well as the Mexican states of Sonora and Chihuahua. The American Ornithological Society classifies all Californian subspecies as C. b. couesi. It is larger than the nominate subspecies and has paler underparts. It is sometimes referred to as C. b. anthonyi, but C. b. couesi takes precedence. This subspecies is named for army surgeon and ornithologist Elliott Coues.
- C. b. bryanti (Anthony, 1894) – found along the western coast of Baja California, separated from the range of C. b. couesi by at least 150 mi (240 km). C. b. bryanti has notable white markings on the rump and scapulars. Its upperparts are darker and more brown than those of the nominate subspecies. It is named for Californian ornithologist Walter Pierce Bryant (1861–1905).
- C. b. purus (Van Rossem, 1930) – present on the eastern and western coasts of Baja California. Its underparts are almost pure white, and its flanks are notably less cinnamon-colored than the nominate subspecies. This subspecies is a division of C. b. affinis, but this distinction is not widely recognized. Purus means 'pure' or 'clean' in Latin.
- C. b. seri (Van Rossem, 1932) – found only on Tiburón Island in the Gulf of California. Its underparts are less cinnamon-colored than the nominate subspecies, and the spots on its abdomen are wider. A 2010 molecular genetics study found no difference between the genomes of C. b. seri and the mainland subspecies. The exact meaning of the subspecies name is unclear; it may be a corruption of sericeus, meaning 'silken' in Latin, or of the modern Latin serinus, meaning 'canary-yellow'.
- C. b. sandiegensis (Rea, 1986) – found in Baja California and parts of southern California. This subspecies is not accepted by the American Ornithological Society, which instead believes it to be intermediate between C. b. couesi and C. b. bryanti, and classifies it as the former. However, it is accepted by the International Ornithologists Union. Its head lacks or has less of a red tinge compared to the nominate subspecies, and its eggs are darker than those of other subspecies. It is named for the city of San Diego.

== Description ==
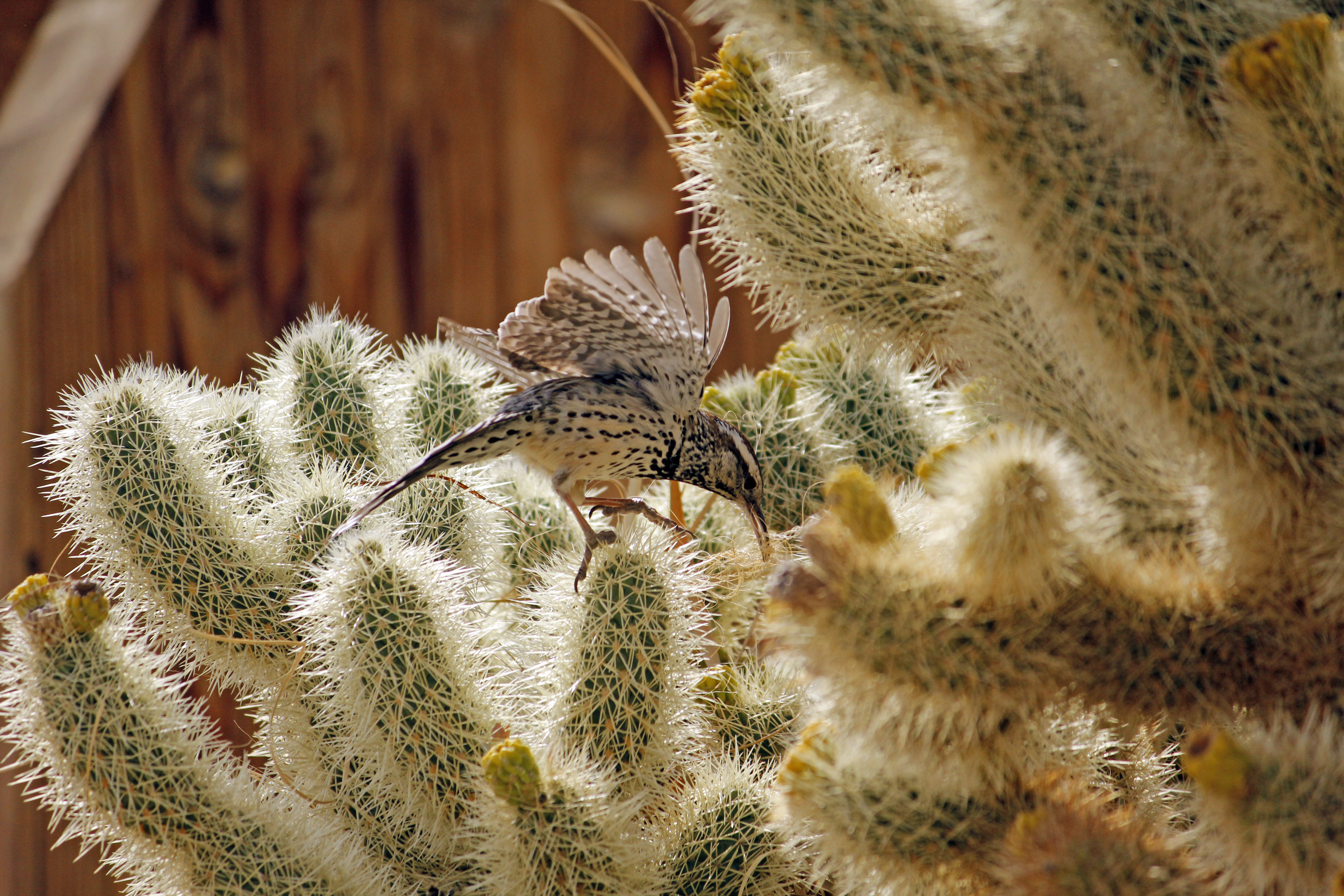
Landing in cholla while nest building, showing off primary and secondary flight feathers

The cactus wren is the largest wren in the United States. It is between 18 and 19 cm (7.1 and 7.5 in) long, and weighs between 33.4 and 46.9 g (1.18 and 1.65 oz), with an average of 38.9 g (1.37 oz). It has a thick, heavy bill that is dull black, curves slightly downwards, and is about the same length as the head. The lower mandible is grayish and pale, and the tail is long and rounded.

The cactus wren's coloration is brown with white speckles. The crown is chocolate-brown with a light red tinge. A distinctive white supercilium (eyebrow) runs from the bill to the nape of its neck, which is brown with white markings. The chin is white, while the neck has black markings on a mostly white background. Their chest is white with brown or black speckles, and the belly is generally white with some brown or black streaks. The rump and back are gray to brown with white and black streaks. Both the lower underparts and the flanks are cinnamon-buff colored.

The cactus wren's ten primary and nine secondary flight feathers are barred, alternating between black and off-white. Its twelve rectrices are barred, alternating between brownish-black and pale gray-brown. The outer rectrices are white tipped. When flying, a white band can be seen on the underside of the tail feathers. The tail is barred in alternating stripes of black, white, and brown. The legs are brown to pink-brown.

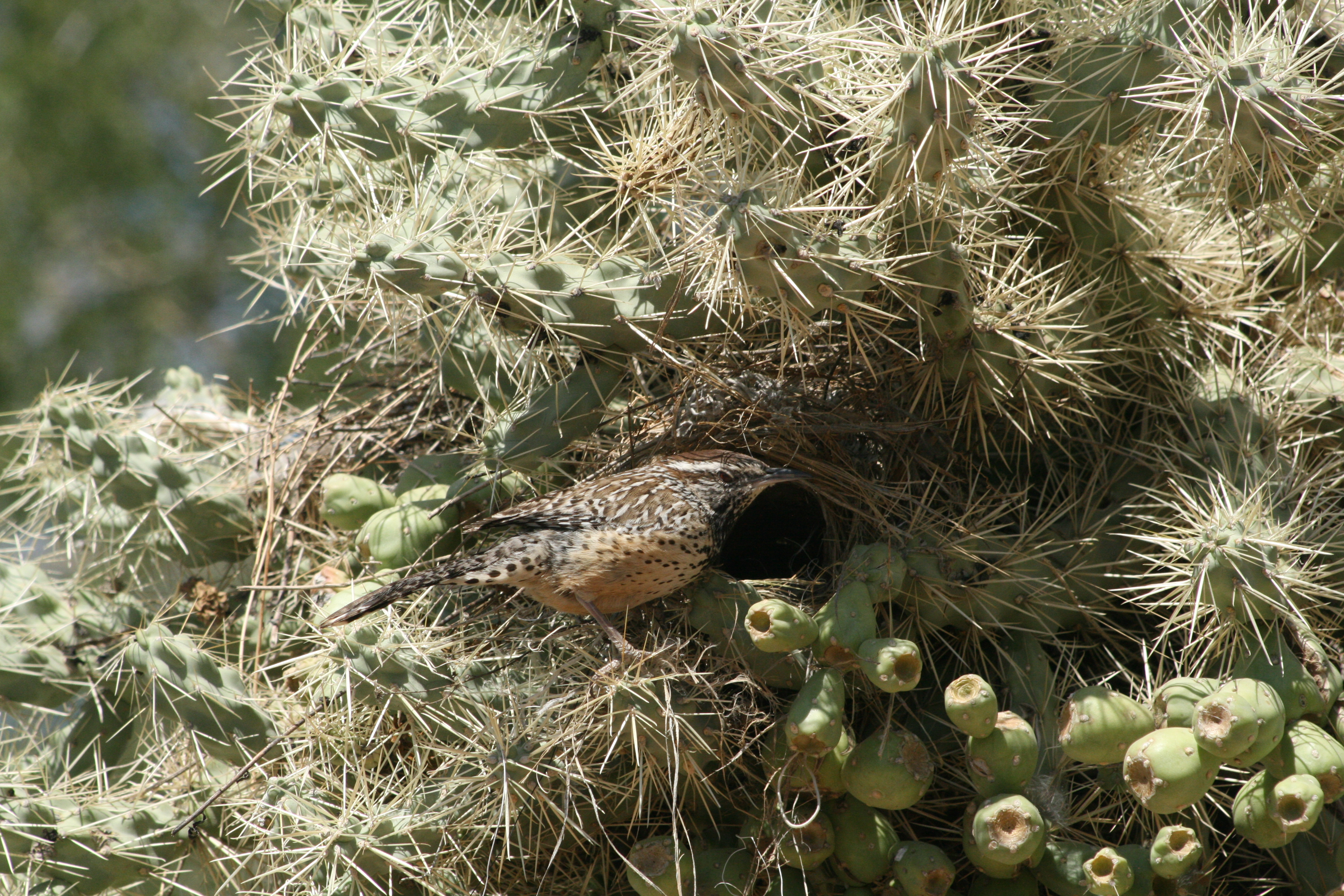
Wren near the entrance of a nest in a cholla cactus. Despite the prickly thorns, this wren's plumage remains in good condition.

Males and females look alike; juveniles can be distinguished by their paler coloration and red-brown to muddy-gray eyes. Adults have more red-brown to red eyes. Other distinctive features of juveniles include the lack of a white nape streak, and less noticeable black chest markings. Summer often takes a harsh toll on plumage; the intense desert sun and prickly vegetation fade and damage feathers. This wear and tear can make identification of juveniles more difficult. Worn feathers are replaced by molting, which happens in adults from July through October, usually in the bird's own territory. Not all feathers will molt in a single season.

Although the cactus wren looks similar to other wrens in its genus, cactus wren identification is made easier since the habitat of Campylorhynchus wrens does not overlap. A notable difference that can assist in identification of the cactus wren is the white tail band seen in flight. The spotted wren looks similar, but is paler and has fewer markings, and its habitat is in oak woodlands (where cactus wrens do not usually live).

=== Vocalizations ===
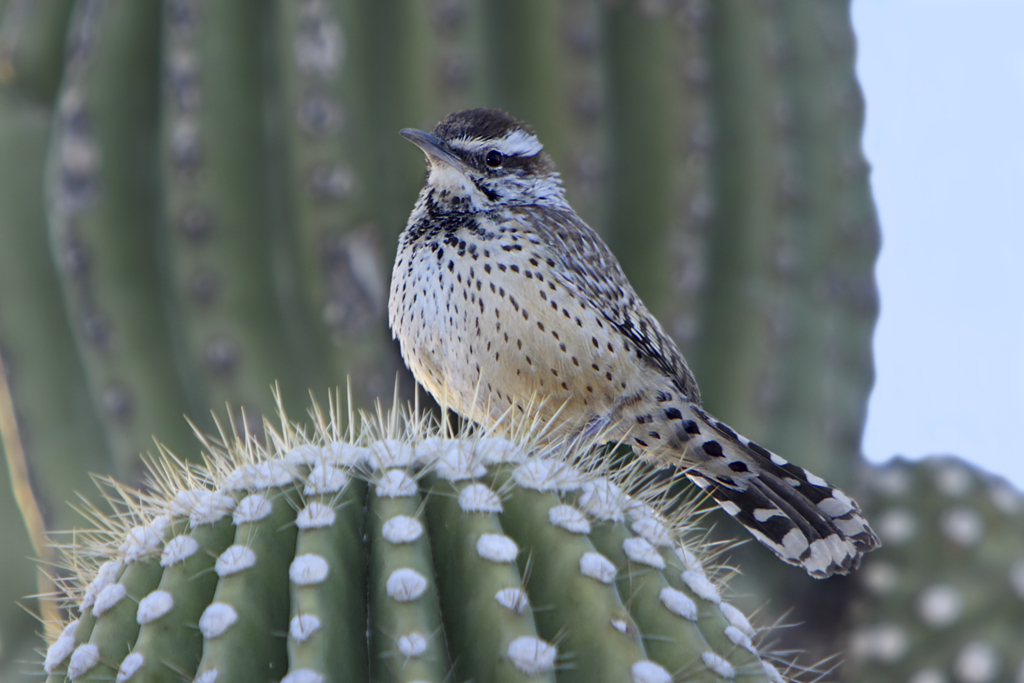
Saguaros are a favored perch from which to sing.

The main call of the cactus wren is a harsh and raspy series of jar-jar-jar, or char, notes, which increase in volume and pitch as the song goes on. Each part of the call lasts around four seconds, with four to eight seconds between calls; calls can carry up to 300 metres (1,000 ft). Cornell University ornithologists described it as sounding "like a car that just won't start". Males are the primary singers, although females can also sing – their song is weaker and higher pitched. Males begin singing before dawn and prefer to vocalize from high vantage points, such as trees, telephone poles, tall cacti, or roofs. At least eight other songs exist besides the main call. A buzz or tek is given as a warning call. Growls serve as a mating and identification call. Rack calls are used for locating an existing mate, or other wrens – this call is often the first vocalization made upon leaving the nest. A high pitched "squeal" is given only during nest building, and is heard rarely. Scri notes are let out during territorial disputes with other wrens. Chicks make various begging vocalizations, including a soft peep. A dzip call is known to be made exclusively by fledglings. The main call is made while the beak is held just slightly above horizontal, and makes the feathers on the bird's throat noticeably extend from their normal position and vibrate.

== Distribution and habitat ==
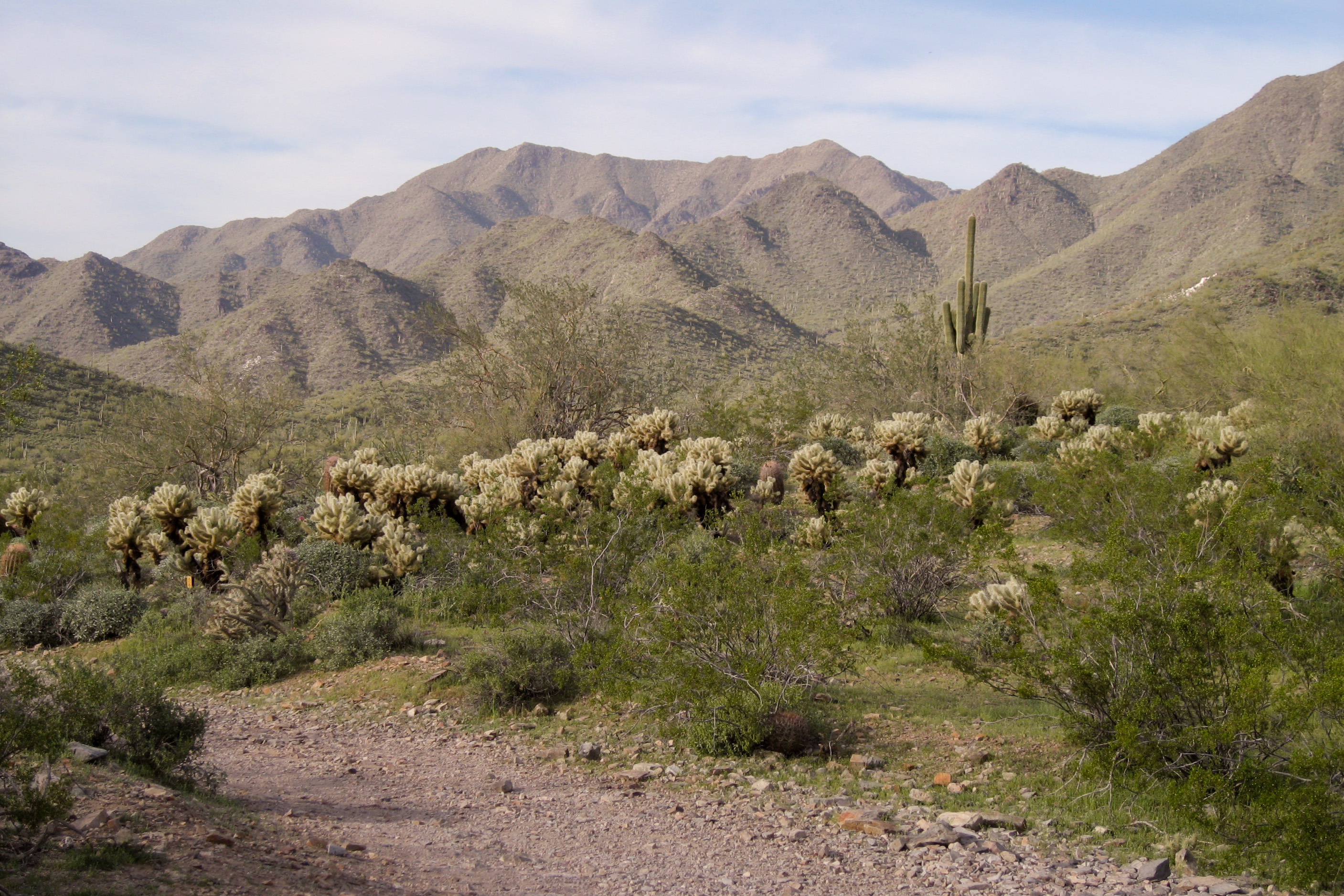
Typical habitat (with abundant cholla) in the McDowell Mountains of Arizona

The cactus wren is a bird of arid and semi-desert regions, and generally requires spiny cacti to nest in. Its range includes the Sonoran and Chihuahuan Deserts. The cactus wren is not migratory, and establishes a permanent territory which it defends vigorously. Territories are typically 1.3 ha (3.2 acres) to 1.9 ha (4.7 acres). The size and shape of territories change very little throughout the season. Territory is defended from other birds by fluffing tails and feathers and vocal scolding. Persistent trespassers may cause the wrens to give chase.

The cactus wren is found only in the United States and Mexico. In the U.S., it is present in California, Nevada, Utah, Arizona, New Mexico, and Texas. In California, it is found mainly as southern coastal populations existing below 600 m (2,000 ft), but some have been found up to 950 m (3,120 ft). Nevada represents the northernmost extent of its range; it is found in the southern tip of the state and the northernmost breeding population is found in Nye County, near Tonopah. In Utah, it is found only in the extreme southwest. Its range in Arizona is widespread in the southern part of the state and along the Colorado River, where it is found from sea-level up to 1,400 m (4,600 ft). Populations in New Mexico exist in the south, down to along the Rio Grande and into Mexico. Its range in both New Mexico and Texas may be expanding northward. Texas cactus wrens live between sea-level and 1,800 m (5,900 ft) throughout the Texas Panhandle, Central Texas, and as far east as Travis County. In Mexico, it is found in Sinaloa, Sonora, Chihuahua, Coahuila, Nuevo León, Hidalgo, and throughout Baja California. On the Central Mexican plateau and in New Mexico, it is found up to 2,000 m (6,600 ft). Populations may be expanding their range in Baja California, but they are not found in the mountains or interior of Baja.

== Behavior and ecology ==
Cactus wrens generally feed and live in pairs, or in family groups from late spring through winter. Flocks of cactus wrens have been reported, and are pretty common. Flocking has been observed only in areas of abundant forage and does not last longer than a few hours. As ground feeders, they spend much of their time on the ground and are not strong fliers, with any flights being somewhat erratic – switching between rapid wing flapping and gliding.

=== Breeding and nesting ===
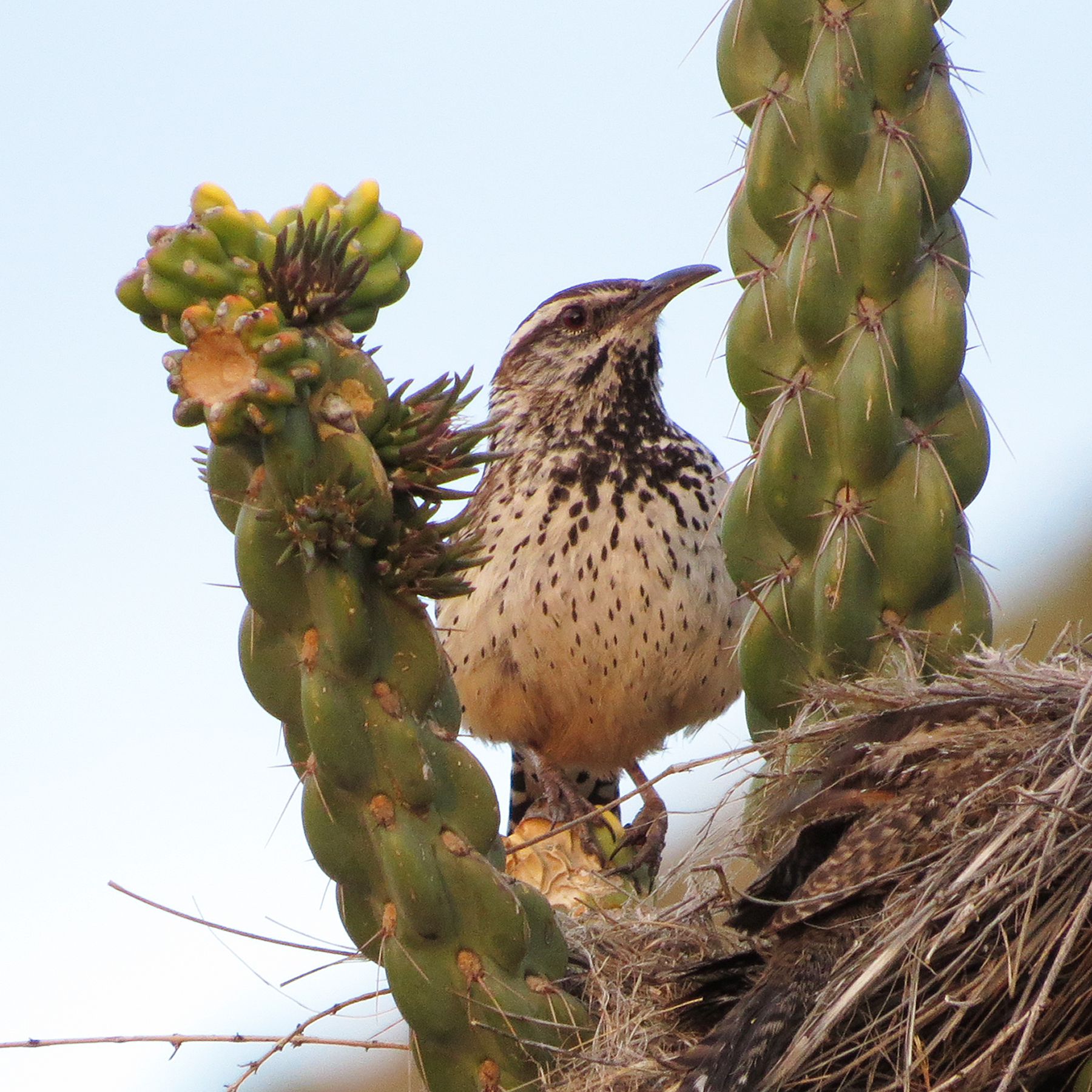
A wren next to a nest lined with feathers. While nesting in jumping cholla is preferred, this wren has chosen another, less spiny, species of cholla.

Cactus wrens form permanent pair bonds, and the pairs defend a territory where they live year-round. There is a distinctive greeting ceremony between pair members, where they spread their wings and tails and give a harsh call. The same motions are used as a breeding display, but with a non-ritualized duet call. Since males and females are identical, birds recognize members of the opposite sex not by size or color but by behavioral differences. Males are more aggressive and are more frequent singers. Mating displays begin with a growl-like noise, and end in gentle pecking. Displays are much shorter than in most bird species, lasting only two to three seconds. Mating season begins in late February and runs through March.

Nests are built in cacti (commonly cholla, prickly pear, and saguaro), thorny desert trees, or yucca. Where available, jumping cholla is overwhelmingly preferred. Nests average about 1 m (3.3 ft) off the ground, and are usually less than 3.0 m (10 ft) off the ground, but have been recorded as high as 9.1 m (30 ft). Nests are prolate spheroidal – the size and shape of an American football or rugby ball – when possible, and are pouchlike in nature. The exact shape and size of nests varies depending on the surroundings; nests are generally loose, bulky and globose, and adapted to fit the nest site. The exterior is constructed of grass, twigs, feathers, weeds and other light detritus, while it is lined with feathers and down – which may come from cactus wrens or other species. Nests built in urban settings use a much wider variety of materials, including many human made items such as paper, string, and lint. Chicken feathers are also used as nest lining in great quantities where available. Urban materials, while easily available, make for weaker and less sturdy nests. A tubelike entrance, about 15 cm (6 in) long, leads to the main nest cavity. The entrance is often oriented to take advantage of the cooling effects of prevailing winds. Nest building takes between one and six days, with Anderson and Anderson reporting an average time of 2.7 days. The nesting pair usually focuses on nest building only for the first three hours of each morning.

Multiple nests are often built. The first nest of a season may use an existing nest that has been renovated; subsequent nests will usually be built from scratch. Adult roosting nests are not usually used as breeding nests, and are less sturdily constructed. While the female lays a clutch in one nest, the male will start to build a second. As soon as the first brood fledges, the female will assist in additional nest building. Once completed, a new clutch will be laid. Up to six broods may be attempted in a year, but it is rare for more than three to survive. One or two broods is more typical.

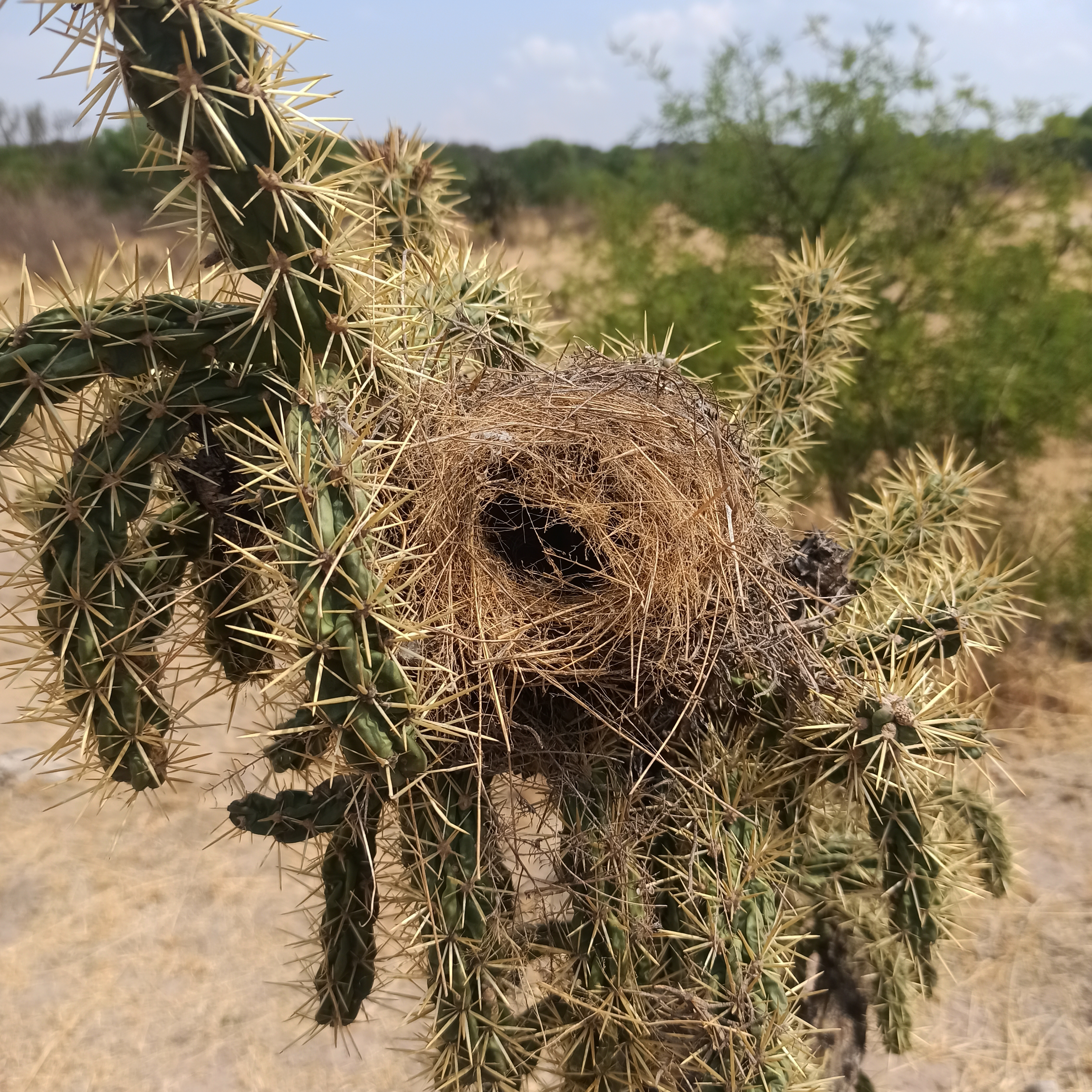
Nest in cane cholla showing the tubelike entrance and loose globose construction

Egg laying occurs no sooner than 18 days after copulation, with March being the height of the laying season. Under favorable conditions, eggs may be laid as early as mid January, but egg laying is delayed at higher elevations. Heavy seasonal rainfall can extend breeding: young have been recorded in nests as late as August. Cactus wrens usually lay three or four eggs (although as many as seven have been recorded) which are smooth and ovate, colored white to pale pink and covered in brown speckles. Eggs are approximately 23 mm (0.91 in) × 17 mm (0.67 in) and average 3.57 g (0.126 oz) in weight. Egg laying begins about a week after nest completion, with one egg per day being laid in the morning. Incubation takes about 16 days and is done solely by females. Wrens are known to destroy the eggs and nests of other nearby birds, but do not engage in, nor suffer from, brood parasitism.

Young hatch asynchronously over the course of about three days. Chicks have closed eyes and are mostly bald, with sparse patches of fuzzy white down. They are fed (mostly insects) by both parents. Young make begging vocalizations at least as early as two days old, with the vocalizations evolving as the chicks age. Chicks are dependent on their parents for the first three weeks after hatching. Nestlings open their eyes after between six and eight days, and grow feathers starting at eight days post hatching (although quills emerge as early as two days after hatching). Adult feather length is reached after twenty days. Nestlings reach adult weight after about 38 days, and gain independence between 30 and 50 days post-hatching. The young may remain in the parent's territory for a while after fledging, but will be driven off by the next breeding season. Juveniles that have not left may help take care of successive broods.

=== Feeding ===
The cactus wren is primarily an insectivore, although it will also take seeds, fruits, nectar, and even small reptiles. They are inquisitive foragers, and will overturn leaves and other objects on the ground to find food. Though primarily ground feeders, they will also forage in larger plants. Some individuals have learned to take insects caught in vehicle radiator grills. Feeding begins in the late morning. As temperatures rise, they seek out shaded areas in order to forage in cooler environments. This is partly to conserve water and to thermoregulate, but also because their insect prey is more sluggish and thus easier to catch in cool temperatures. The cactus wren can survive as a true xerophile, existing without any free water as it receives almost all water from its diet. Eating cactus fruits is an important source of water, and individuals have been seen drinking cactus sap from wounds inflicted by Gila woodpeckers. Cactus wrens also sip nectar from saguaro blossoms and eat insects trapped within, serving as pollinators in the process. Parents feed young with whole insects, although they may first remove wings or legs. One study found that the average caloric need of a developing chick is about 15 medium-sized grasshoppers per day.

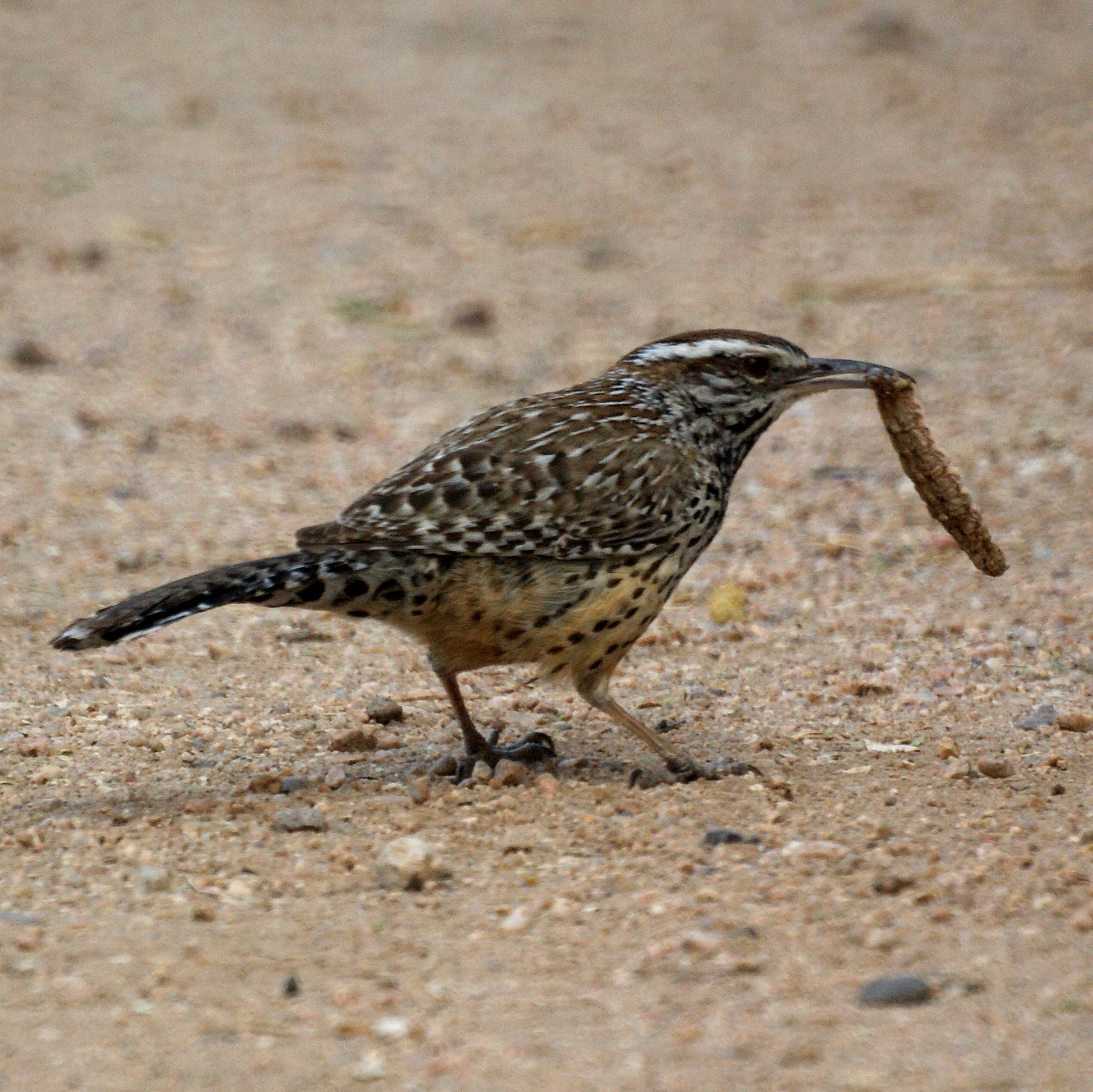
With freshly caught insect prey, showing the preference for ground feeding

Feeding on a saguaro cactus blossom in an urban environment

=== Survival ===
Nests built in cactus provide a degree of protection to young; yet even in a cactus, young wrens are vulnerable to predation by coachwhip snakes. When threatened, young in nests were observed to try to blend in with the nest and flattened themselves against the nest walls. Adults are preyed upon by coyotes, foxes, hawks, bald eagles, domestic cats, and greater roadrunners. Upon detection of predators, cactus wrens will usually mob the predator and vocally scold it. They may also chase ground based predators and intruders. Predator alarm calls are usually a low buzz, or sometimes a staccato tek which is repeated. In response to birds of prey, adults may attempt to move closer to the ground or leave calling spots.

Cactus wrens can live at least five years in the wild, but average lifespan is two years for males and 1.3 years for females. Year-over-year decline is high, often a result of predation. Roughly one-third of clutches laid each year are lost. Fledglings are most vulnerable to predation, and adult wrens may occasionally fail to lead all fledglings back to roosting spots. Fledglings left outside of roosts overnight face greatly increased predation. The main cause of death in fledglings seems to be starvation due to lack of foraging experience.

Numerous parasites affect the cactus wren. A study of Californian cactus wrens showed that a common parasite is Avifilaris (a type of microfilaria parasitic worm), which are spread by biting insects. Little is known about the life cycle of the worms, beyond that they are not transmissible to humans. Leucocytozoon species also affect the wren, although the prevalence and effects are not well known. The same study found that Neoschoengastia americana, the turkey chigger, affects birds during late summer and early fall. The tiny biting insects cause skin lesions, but may not cause harm to their host except in large numbers.

Cactus wrens share a similar range to the curve-billed thrasher, as well as the jumping cholla, a favored plant for both species to nest in. Because of this, interspecific conflict is frequent. Fights over food are rare, but fights to protect fledglings are heated. They will vigorously work to destroy each other's nests, although typically only roosting nests, not breeding nests, are destroyed. Despite this, broods of curve-billeds and cactus wrens may still be concurrently and successfully raised even feet away from each other. Anderson and Anderson noted a minimum nest distance of a highly unusual 20 centimetres (6 in) (neither nest was destroyed by the other throughout an entire season), although average interspecific nest distances were well over 30 metres (100 ft). Nest destruction is almost always unsuccessful, and less intense, during breeding times, as both species adamantly defend their own nests. Once mating season wanes and fledglings emerge, competition becomes more fierce.

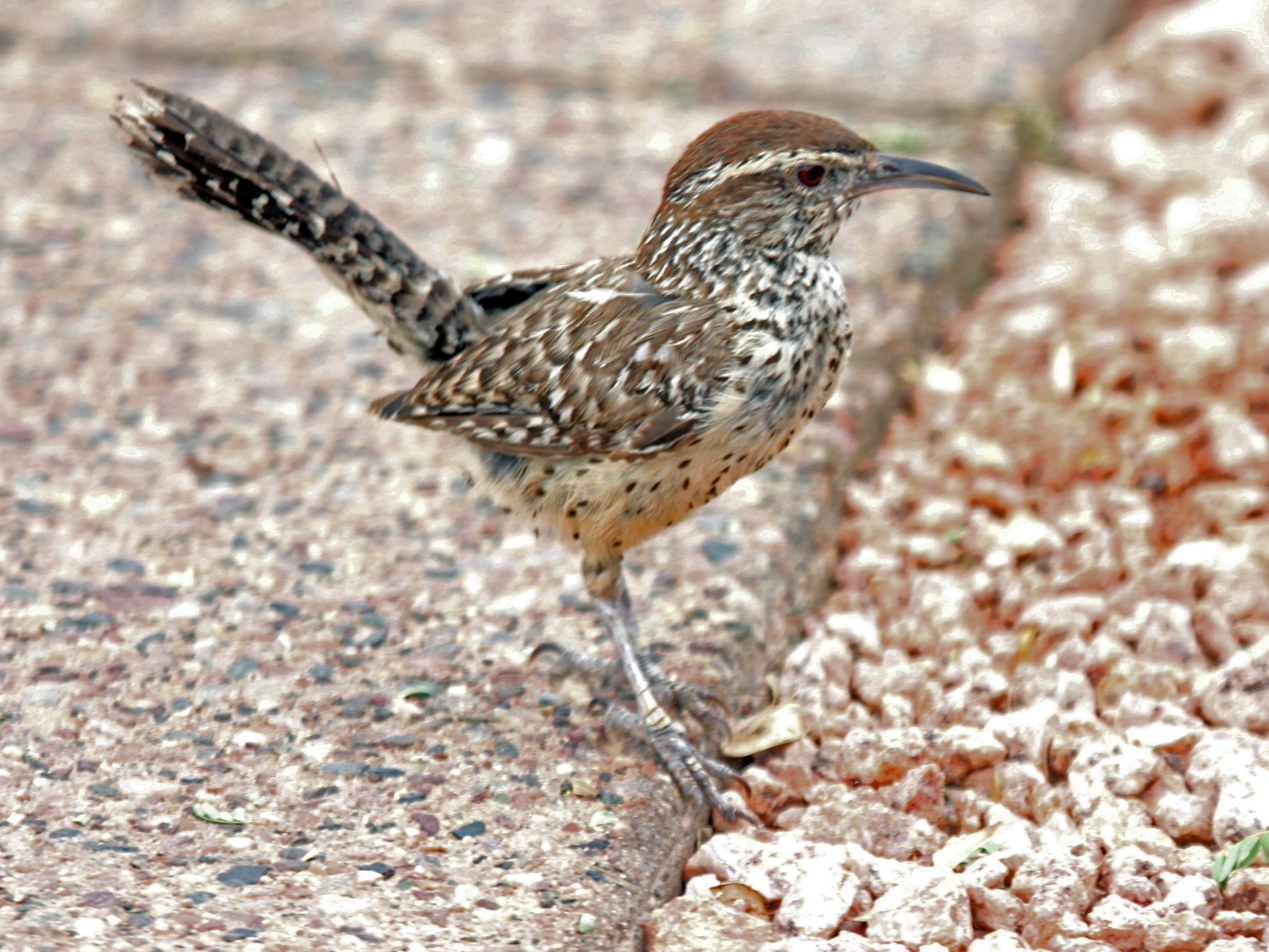
Juvenile on a sidewalk

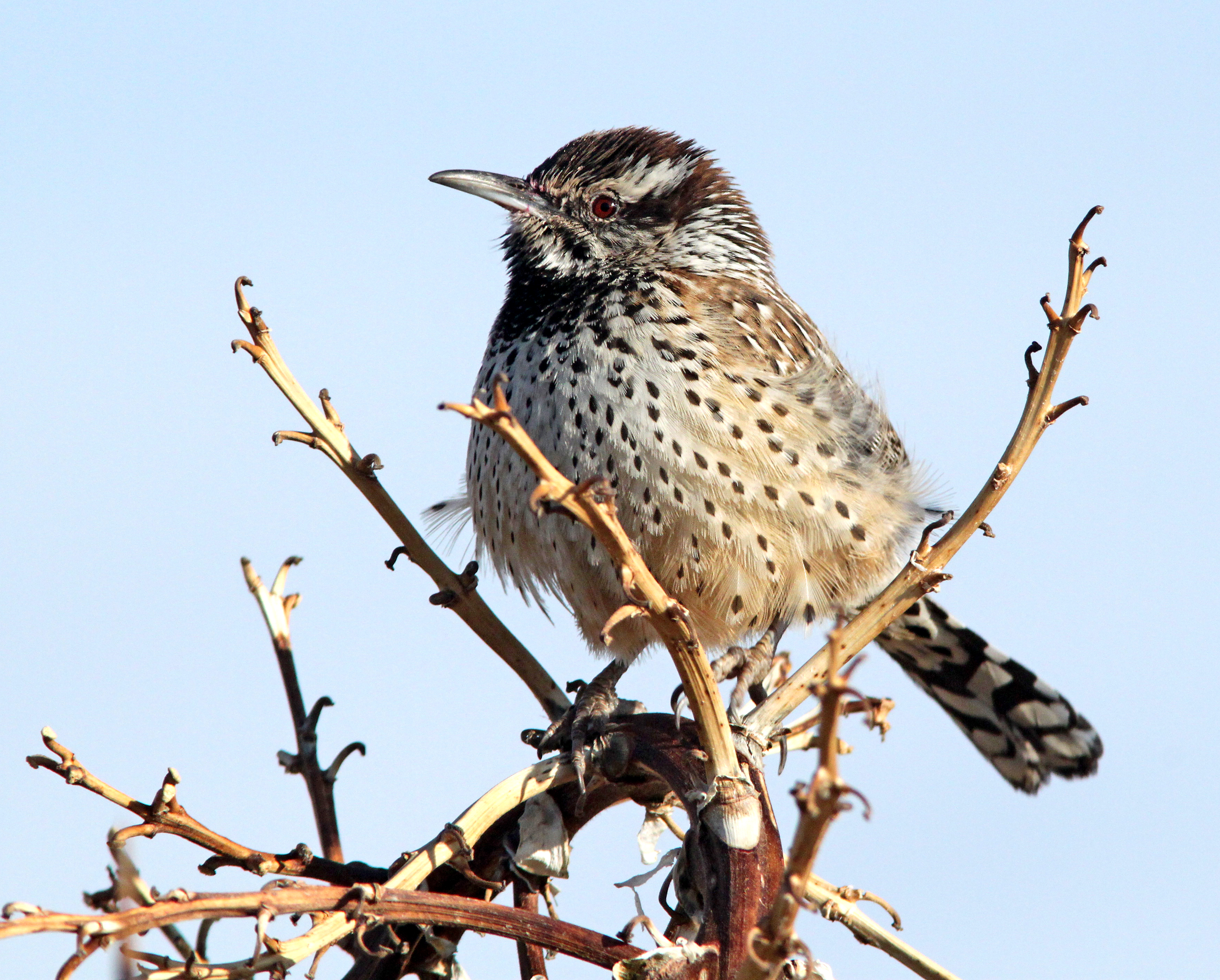
Any high perch, not just cacti, can serve as respite from ground-based predators.

== Relationship to humans ==
The cactus wren is the state bird of Arizona, so designated on 16 March 1931 by the Arizona State Legislature in House Bill 128. The bill specifically designates the subspecies C. b. couesi as the state bird, and refers to the bird as both the "Cactus Wren" and "Coues' Cactus Wren". The subspecies' namesake, Elliot Coues, served as a surgeon at Fort Whipple in Arizona from 1864 until at least 1871, and again in 1880, and was involved in nature surveys of the Arizona Territory.

== Status ==
The cactus wren is abundant in most of its native range, although its numbers may be declining in Texas and southern California. The International Union for Conservation of Nature classifies its population as "decreasing", but ranks the species's conservation status as least concern. Current population estimates put the species at about seven million individuals, with slightly more than half in Mexico, and the balance in the United States. Populations declined by 55% between 1966 and 2015. This decline was not consistent across the range: U.S. populations decreased more than Mexican ones, but locally – such as in Nevada, New Mexico, and the Chihuahuan desert – populations have increased. Populations in Texas have faced the steepest declines, followed by Arizona and California.

Coastal populations in southern California face threats due to habitat loss as a result of suburban development. Populations have been highly fragmented due to urbanization, which may lead to genetic differentiation among isolated populations and could threaten overall species viability. Similar species (such as the wrentit and Bewick's wren) that nest in coastal sage scrub (the preferred nesting habitat of coastal cactus wrens) have faced high levels of local extinction. California subspecies C. b. sandiegensis was petitioned to be listed as federally endangered in 1990, but was not due to taxonomic disputes as to whether C. b. sandiegensis was actually distinct from the rest of the cactus wren population. C. b. sandiegensis is, however, listed as a "California Species of Special Concern".

Across the cactus wren's range, habitat fragmentation is a major problem. Urban populations have faced especially steep declines. Habitat degradation at the edge of the habitat/urban interface has led to general population loss. Study has shown that fire has a large impact on cactus wrens due to their territoriality, with populations persisting only in unburned pockets. These issues are compounded by the apparently poor ability of the cactus wren to disperse: each subsequent generation will usually not travel far to establish a territory. Most young once chased out of their parents' territory, will generally establish their new territory directly adjacent to that of their parents. Other issues include invasive grasses, which take up valuable foraging space, as the wren forages in mostly open areas. Domestic cats also take a high proportion of birds in urban settings. Despite the threats it faces, the cactus wren has proved adaptable, especially to human modifications. It can survive in degraded environments as long as suitable nesting habitat, such as spiny cactus, remains.
