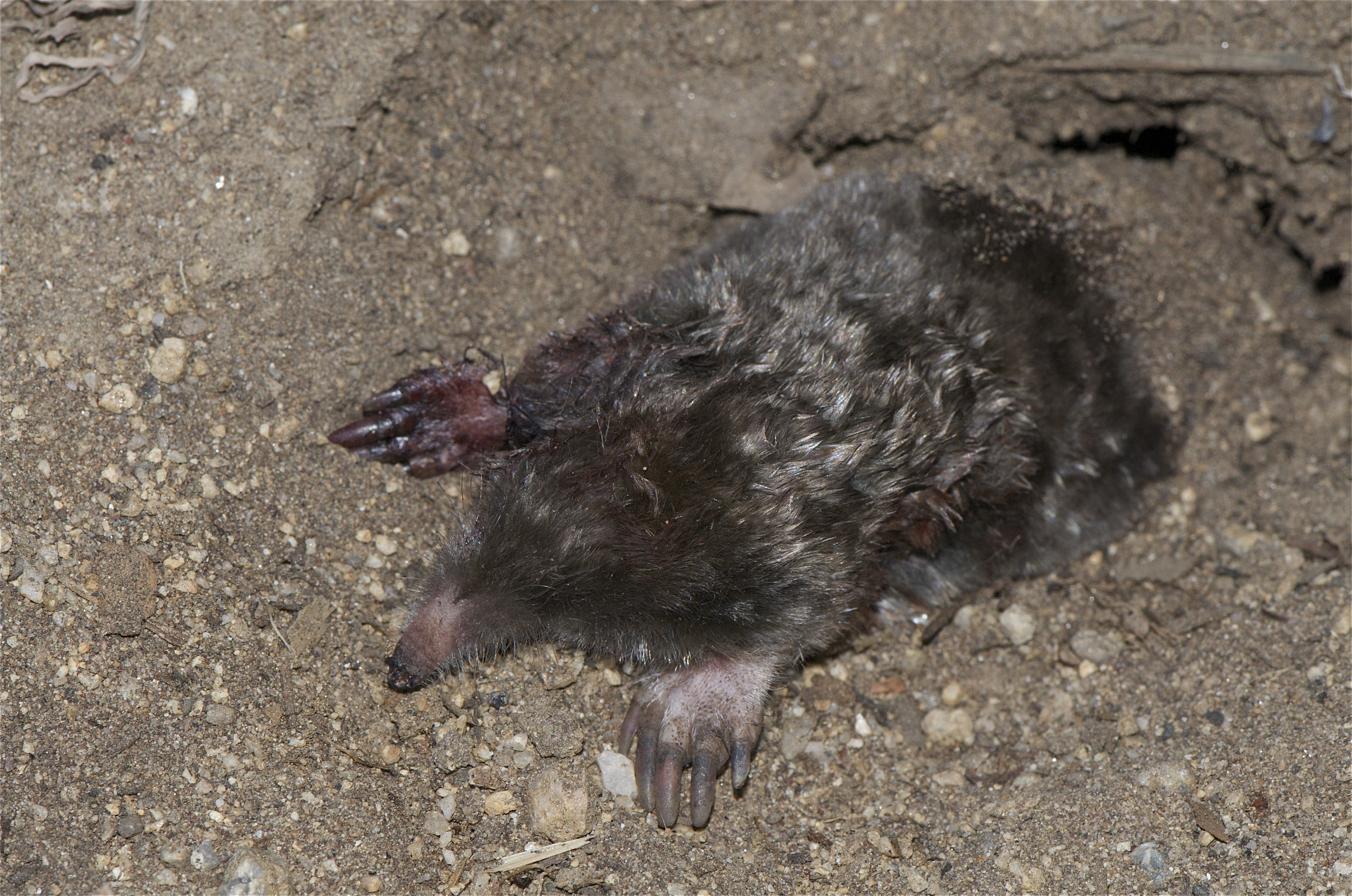

Conservation status
- Least Concern (IUCN 3.1)

Scientific classification
- Kingdom: Animalia
- Phylum: Chordata
- Class: Mammalia
- Order: Eulipotyphla
- Family: Talpidae
- Genus: Scapanus
- Species: S. townsendii

Binomial name
- Scapanus townsendii (Bachman, 1839)

Subspecies
- Scapanus townsendii townsendii (Bachman, 1839); Scapanus townsendii olympicus Johnson & Yates, 1980
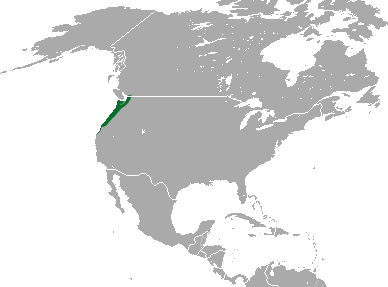
- Townsend's mole range

= Townsend's mole =

Species of mammal

Townsend's mole (Scapanus townsendii) is a fossorial mammal in the family Talpidae, and is the largest North American mole. It was named after the American naturalist John Kirk Townsend. The name was selected at the request of Thomas Nuttall as a patronym to honor Townsend's contribution.

== Distribution and habitat ==
It is found in open lowland and wooded areas with moist soils along the Pacific coast from southwestern British Columbia to northwestern California. This animal's total range in Canada is estimated to be 20 km² (7.7 mi^{2}).

== Conservation ==
Townsend's mole is classified as Least Concern by the IUCN; however, in Canada it is considered an endangered species.

== Description ==
It has velvety black fur, a pointed snout and a short, thick, a tail with barely any hair. It is about 21 cm (8.3 in) in length including a 4 cm (1.6 in) tail, and weighs about 138 grams (4.9 oz). Its front paws are broad and spade-shaped, specialized for digging; the rear paws are smaller. It has 44 teeth. Its ears are not visible and it has small eyes. It is similar in appearance to the smaller coast mole.

== Behavior, diet, and breeding ==
Townsend's mole spends most of its time underground, foraging in shallow burrows for earthworms, small invertebrates and plant material. It is active year-round. It is mainly solitary except during mating in late winter. The female has a litter of two to four young in a deep burrow.

== Sources ==
- Bachman, John (1839). "Description of several new species of American quadruped". Journal of the Academy of Natural Sciences of Philadelphia. 8 (60): 57–74.
- Carraway, Leslie N.; Alexander, Lois F.; Verts, B. J. (23 April 1993). "Scapanus townsendii" (PDF). Mammalian Species (434): 1–7. doi:10.2307/3504286. JSTOR 3504286.
