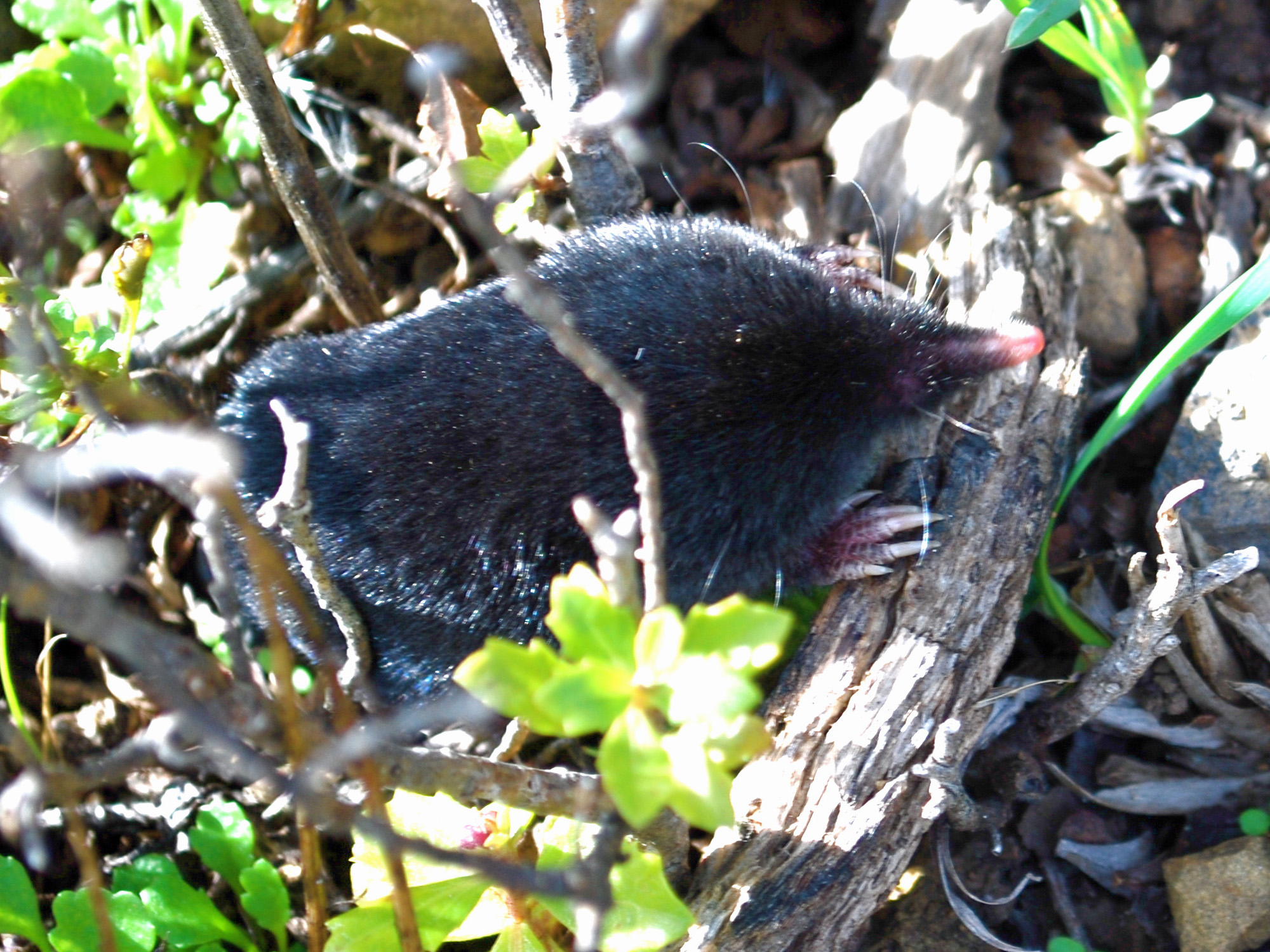

Conservation status
- Least Concern (IUCN 3.1)

Scientific classification
- Kingdom: Animalia
- Phylum: Chordata
- Class: Mammalia
- Infraclass: Placentalia
- Order: Eulipotyphla
- Family: Talpidae
- Genus: Scapanus
- Species: S. latimanus

Binomial name
- Scapanus latimanus (Bachman, 1842)
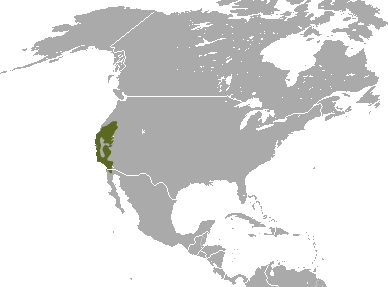
- Northern broad-footed mole range (includes S. occultus)

= Northern broad-footed mole =

Species of mammal

The northern broad-footed mole (Scapanus latimanus) is a species of mammal in the family Talpidae. It is endemic to the United States, where it is found in northern California, Nevada and Oregon at elevations up to 9,800 feet (3,000 m) above sea level.

== Taxonomy ==
Formerly, this species was thought to have a wider range reaching down to northernmost Baja California, Mexico, with a disjunct population further south in Sierra de San Pedro Martir. However, taxonomic and morphological studies indicate that the subspecies in southern California and northernmost Baja California is a distinct species, the southern broad-footed mole (S. occultus) and the Sierra de San Pedro Martir subspecies is also a distinct species, the Mexican mole (S. anthonyi). Due to this, the range of S. latimanus is thought to be restricted to the United States.

Up to 12 subspecies of S. latimanus have been described, but S. anthonyi and S. occultus have been split as distinct species. Analysis of the remaining subspecies have found that most of them represent junior synonyms of other subspecies; under this classification, only four subspecies of S. latimanus remain: S. l. latimanus, S. l. minisculus, S. l. insularis, and S. l. parvus.

== Description ==
The broad-footed mole can be distinguished from other species of Scapanus by its dark brown to silvery fur which is short, soft, and plush-like in texture with uniform coloration, and 40–44 unevenly spaced unicuspid teeth. Adults bodies are short and cylindrical with a long and pointed snout. The forefeet are greatly expanded with flattened palms and long heavy claws. The tail is scantily covered with coarse hair. On average, body lengths range from 5.5 to 7.1 inches (14 to 18 cm) in total length, with males slightly larger than females. Populations in more humid environments also tend to have larger individuals than those from southern, drier areas. The dental formula of Scapanus latimanus is 3.1.4.33.1.4.3 × 2 = 44.

Its karyotype has 2n = 34, FN = 64. As with most moles, it requires moist, friable soils, where it eats earthworms, insects, other invertebrates and some plant matter.

Scapanus latimanus is a fossorial mammal, living below ground for most of its life. Only one animal occupies a burrow at a time and if a burrow has been vacated, it is often reoccupied within 2 days. Tunnels are typically dug far below surface level and the excess earth is removed via shafts that run laterally and vertically up to the surface. The excess earth pushed out of these shafts form distinct volcano-shaped mounds with the older earth towards the outer base and the newer earth towards the core. Shallow surface tunnels are sometimes dug and form a ridge in the soil on the surface. How often exactly these tunnels are used is unknown, as they are used irregularly.
