= Masticophis anthonyi =

Conservation status
- Critically Endangered (IUCN 3.1)

Scientific classification
- Kingdom: Animalia
- Phylum: Chordata
- Class: Reptilia
- Order: Squamata
- Suborder: Serpentes
- Family: Colubridae
- Genus: Masticophis
- Species: M. anthonyi

Binomial name
- Masticophis anthonyi (Stejneger, 1901)

Synonyms
- Bascanion anthonyi Stejneger, 1901; Coluber anthonyi (Stejneger, 1901)

Species of lizard

Masticophis anthonyi, also known commonly as the Clarion Island whip snake and el látigo de Isla Clarión in Mexican Spanish, is a species of snake in the subfamily Colubrinae of the family Colubridae. The species is endemic to Clarion Island in Mexico.

== Etymology ==
The specific name, anthonyi, is in honor of American ornithologist Alfred Webster Anthony.

== Habitat ==
The natural habitats of Masticophis anthonyi are grassland and shrubland.

== Reproduction ==
Masticophis anthonyi is oviparous.
