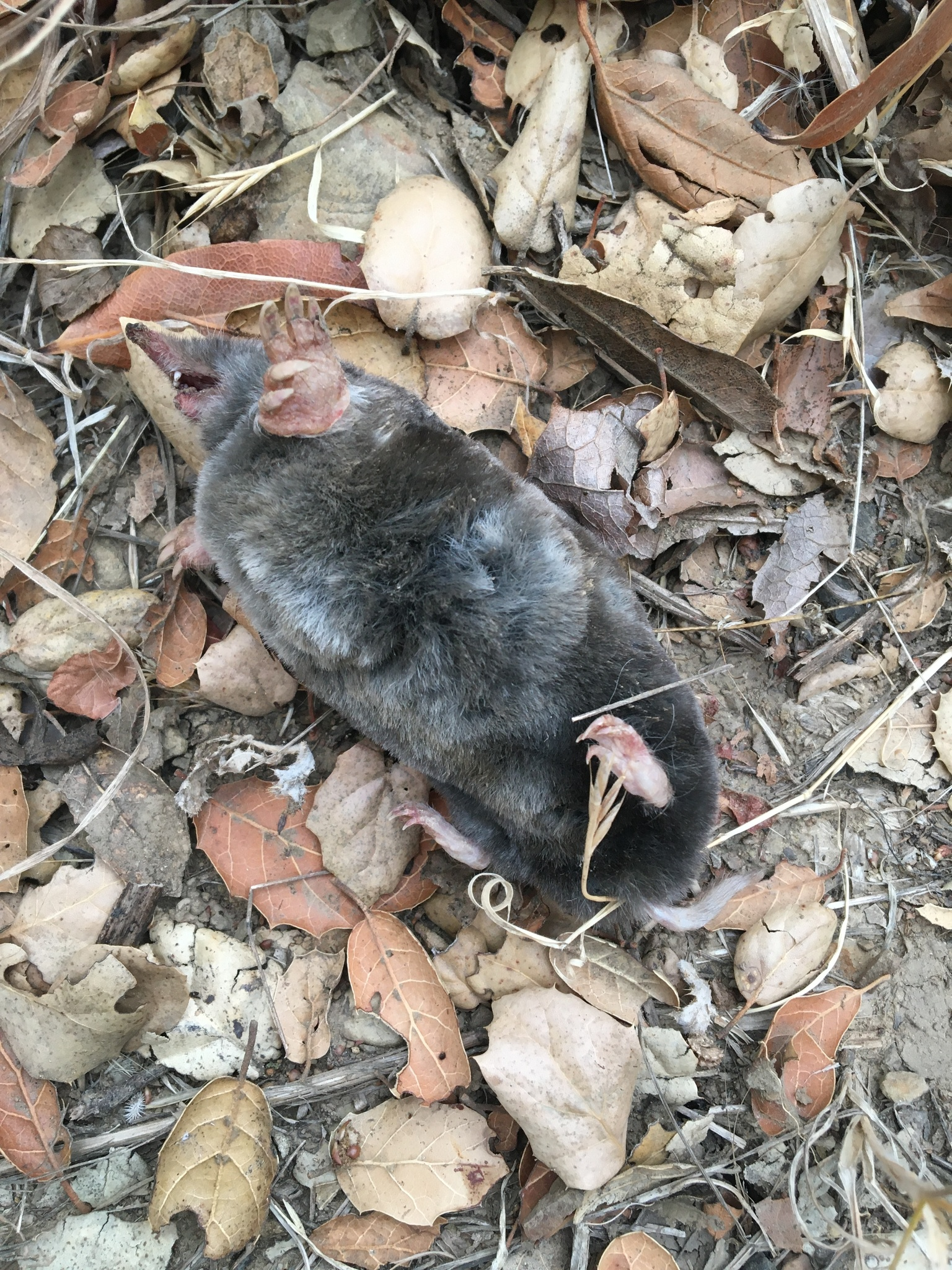
- Deceased individual

Scientific classification
- Kingdom: Animalia
- Phylum: Chordata
- Class: Mammalia
- Order: Eulipotyphla
- Family: Talpidae
- Genus: Scapanus
- Species: S. occultus

Binomial name
- Scapanus occultus Grinnell & Swarth, 1912

Synonyms
- Scapanus latimanus occultus

= Southern broad-footed mole =

Species of mammal

The southern broad-footed mole (Scapanus occultus) is a species of mammal in the family Talpidae. It is found only in the U.S. state of California and northernmost Baja California in Mexico.

== Taxonomy ==
It was formerly considered a subspecies of the northern broad-footed mole (S. latimanus), with the combined species being known as the broad-footed mole, but a 2021 study found sufficient anatomical and genetic divergence to split both as distinct species. The Mexican mole (S. anthonyi) was formerly thought to be a subspecies of the broad-footed mole but is now also considered a distinct species.

== Distribution ==
The southern broad-footed mole is most commonly found in California, but is less present in the hot deserts and portions of the Central Valley. Its distribution ranges from throughout the southern Sierra Nevada and most of southern California from San Luis Obispo south to the U.S.-Mexico border, and along the Peninsular Ranges into northernmost Baja California. In the two areas where Scapanus occultus and S. latimanus are sympatric (a portion of the southern Sierra Nevada and the northern portion of Santa Barbara), S. occultus inhabits lower altitudes and S. latimanus inhabits higher ones. Optimal habitats for this species are annual and perennial grassland, pasture, montane and valley foothill riparian, and aspen. It can also be found in a variety of open forest habitats, cropland, wet meadow, and orchard-vineyards. This species requires moist, friable soils suitable for tunnelling and its elevational range extends from near sea level to up to about 3,000 m (9,800 ft).

== Description ==
Scapanus occultus is overall smaller in body size than S. latimanus, and has a longer and wider skull. Typical measurements for the broad-footed mole complex ranges around 14–17 cm (5.5–6.7 in), tail lengths of around 25–35 mm (1.0–1.4 in), and hind-foot lengths of around 18–21 mm (0.7–0.8 in).

== Behavior ==
This animal is a solitary, subterranean species that spends almost its entire life beneath the surface in extensive tunnel systems. Its comes are constructed of detailed tunnel systems. This species is very territorial and defends its burrows against conspecifics. Breeding season typically runs from February to May and females may produce litters of 2–5 with an average of about 4. The young leave their nests around 30-35 days of lactation, usually around early summer.

=== Diet and foraging ===
The diet of the southern broad-footed mole consists primarily of earthworms, spiders, centipedes, and other invertebrates residing in soil. It may occasionally also consume small plant material or small vertebrates. This species allocates prey through sensing soil vibrations and digs rapidly in suitable soils to capture its target. Scapanus occultus does not have a true hibernation period and is active year-round, showcasing increased activity after rainfall when soils are moister and easier to dig.

== Ecological role ==
This mole plays an extremely important role in soil aeration through its practice of digging and tunneling, which helps to mix organic matter and cycle nutrients in the soil. It is also important in the soil food web, helping regulate invertebrate populations in order to provide prey for predators higher on the food chain.

== Conservation and human interactions ==
Currently, S. occultus has not been classified as an endangered species. However, many local threats still exist. Factors such as urban development, intensive agriculture and disturbance of tunnel systems all pose a relative risk of altering the habitat of these moles which could prove harmful.

Despite the benefits it provides to the soil ecosystem through aeration and predation of soil pests, people sometimes still view them as pests in lawns environments due to its burrowing habits. California agriculture management has had to work to balance mole control with recognizing the important ecological role it plays.
