= Alfred Webster Anthony =

American ornithologist (1865–1939)

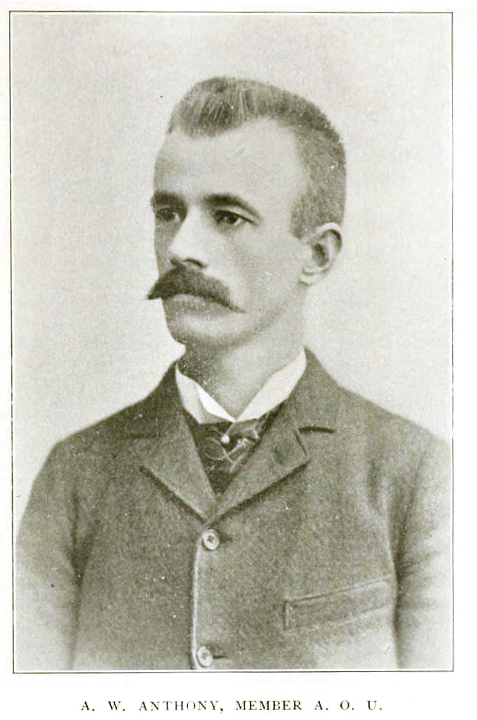

Alfred Webster Anthony (December 25, 1865 – May 14, 1939) was an American mining engineer and a collector of natural history specimens. He discovered several new subspecies and species and several new descriptions were made from his collections. He was a fellow of the American Ornithologists' Union and an honorary member of the American Society of Mammalogists.

Anthony was born in Cayuga County, New York. His father worked in mining and as a boy he travelled into the mountains and wilderness areas. He studied at the Colorado School of Mines and worked in the gold mining business from 1887. In 1886 he spent some time in New Mexico where he collected small mammals. From this collection, C. Hart Merriam described and named Peromyscus anthonyi (now a subspecies of the cactus mouse), Scapanus anthonyi, and Sciurus griseus anthonyi. In 1888 he married Anabel Klink after whom he named Sialia mexicana anabelae. He explored the islands off the West coast of the US including Socorro, Tres Marias, and Revillagigedos after purchasing a schooner H. C. Wahlberg. In 1892 he visited Guadalupe along with Charles H. Townsend to study seals. From 1903 he worked in Alaska and then at Oregon where he also owned a ranch. In 1920 he became director of the San Diego Natural History Museum, working for four years. The Californian succulent Dudleya anthonyi was also among the many species named after him. His collections of specimens from Guatemala was acquired by the American Museum of Natural History in 1904. He donated most of his specimens (including 10,000 birds) to the Carnegie Museum and to the San Diego Museum of Natural History. He explored and sailed around Guatemala in 1924. Apart from collection, he also studied birds and photographed them.

Anthony died at home in San Diego. Anthony's son Harold E. Anthony became a curator of mammals at the American Museum of Natural History.

A species of snake, Masticophis anthonyi, is named in his honor.
