= Mexican mole =

Scientific classification
- Kingdom: Animalia
- Phylum: Chordata
- Class: Mammalia
- Order: Eulipotyphla
- Family: Talpidae
- Genus: Scapanus
- Species: S. anthonyi

Binomial name
- Scapanus anthonyi Allen, 1893
- Mexican mole range

Synonyms
- Scapanus latimanus anthonyi

Species of mammal

The Mexican mole (Scapanus anthonyi) is a species of mammal in the family Talpidae. It is endemic to Baja California in Mexico, where it is restricted to the highlands of the Sierra de San Pedro Mártir mountain range.

== Taxonomy ==
Its specific epithet references naturalist Alfred Webster Anthony. It was previously thought to be a subspecies of the broad-footed mole (S. latimanus, but has now been split into two different species, of which the southern taxon is S. occultus), but it was split as a distinct species in a 2005 study. In 2021, a phylogenetic analysis confirmed its distinctiveness and found it to be sister to all other members of the genus Scapanus.

== Distribution and habitat ==
This species inhabits the Sierra Juárez and San Pedro Mártir pine–oak forests ecoregion. Although its habitat is protected, large amounts of cattle graze in the area and destroy mole galleries.
