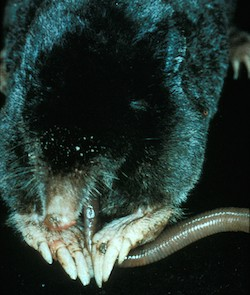

Conservation status
- Least Concern (IUCN 3.1)

- Secure (NatureServe)

Scientific classification
- Kingdom: Animalia
- Phylum: Chordata
- Class: Mammalia
- Order: Eulipotyphla
- Family: Talpidae
- Genus: Scapanus
- Species: S. orarius

Binomial name
- Scapanus orarius (True, 1896)
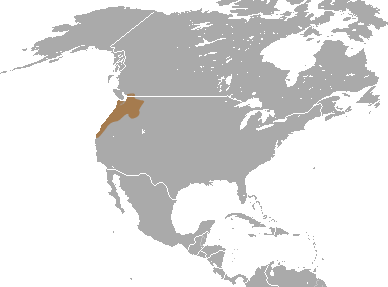
- Coast Mole range

= Coast mole =

Species of mammal

The coast mole or Pacific mole (Scapanus orarius) is a medium-sized North American mole found in forested and open areas with moist soils along the Pacific coast from southwestern British Columbia to northwestern California.

== Taxonomy ==
Two subspecies are recognized: the nominate, S. o. orarius, and Scheffer's coast mole, S. o. schefferi. The nominate has a shorter skull and less enlarged maxillary region. The patterns of teeth shearing on dirt and earthworms (their main diet) set both subspecies apart from similar species.

== Description ==
The coast mole is generally less than 200 mm long, with the tail being one-fourth of its total length. The fur is uniformly black. The skull is relatively narrow and long, with a sublacrimal-maxillary ridge that is underdeveloped. Teeth are uncrowned and evenly spaced.

== Distribution and habitat ==
The coast mole has a disjunct distribution, occurring from the western end of British Columbia, Canada through the western regions of Oregon and Washington, and in some parts of Northern California (coastal regions). The most extreme divergence of range for the coast mole has been seen to reach some parts of west-central Idaho. The species has a primarily fossorial lifestyle, but is not restricted solely to underground habitats. Like many other species of moles, it is capable of surfacing for scavenging purposes and juvenile dispersals, especially in the summer months. It may inhabit, but is not restricted to, agricultural land, sand dunes, grassy-meadows, sagebrush, deciduous forest, and pine forests (yellow-pine, Douglas fir, spruce, hemlock, and redwood).

== Ecology ==
=== Diet ===
Coast moles eat insects and other small invertebrates including earthworms, which it hunts in moderately moist soil environments. Coast moles will increase their digging activity when they sense shifting densities of earthworms. Food items found in coast mole stomachs included earthworms (the majority by mass), slugs, earthworm eggs, and larval and adult insects.

=== Behavior ===
The coast mole is primarily solitary and only become social during mating season. Coast mole populations and their corresponding tunnel systems seem to be larger in areas with damp soil and high earthworm densities. Coast moles are primarily nocturnal, but do not confine their activities to any specific part of the night. It has been found that an individual mole's activities tend to be asynchronous to those of neighboring moles.

=== Mating and reproduction ===
Mating usually occurs in period from late January and early March. During this time, coast moles will diverge from their normal solitary lifestyles and begin expanding their tunnel systems, even venturing into other coast mole tunnel systems in attempts to find a mating partner. Little is known about their gestation and nursing behavior. Females produce a single litter per year, and maternal care is limited. Coast mole offspring can become reproductively active within nine to ten months of birth.

== Adaptation to burrowing lifestyle ==
Coast moles primarily use their noses for sensing their surroundings underground. Eimer's organ is a small, densely innervated sensory structure found in the nose of most talpid moles, including the coast mole, which seems to play a critical role in tactile discrimination and enables it to differentiate between prey items in an environment with little to no visual input. Moles and monotremes appear to have developed this as a convergent structure, using common components of mammalian skin to maximize tactile sensitivity.

Air supply in coast mole tunnels may be short on oxygen, but enriched with carbon dioxide from respiration. One adaptation to these environmental challenges is an increased blood volume for oxygen storage. Another is a modified hemoglobin, found in the coast mole and the eastern mole, that allows for heightened Cl- ion binding activity that is not affected by the relatively cold temperatures of mole tunnels.

== Conservation ==
The species has been classified as Least Concern by the IUCN, since it appears to be common in a wide variety of habitats throughout its range.
