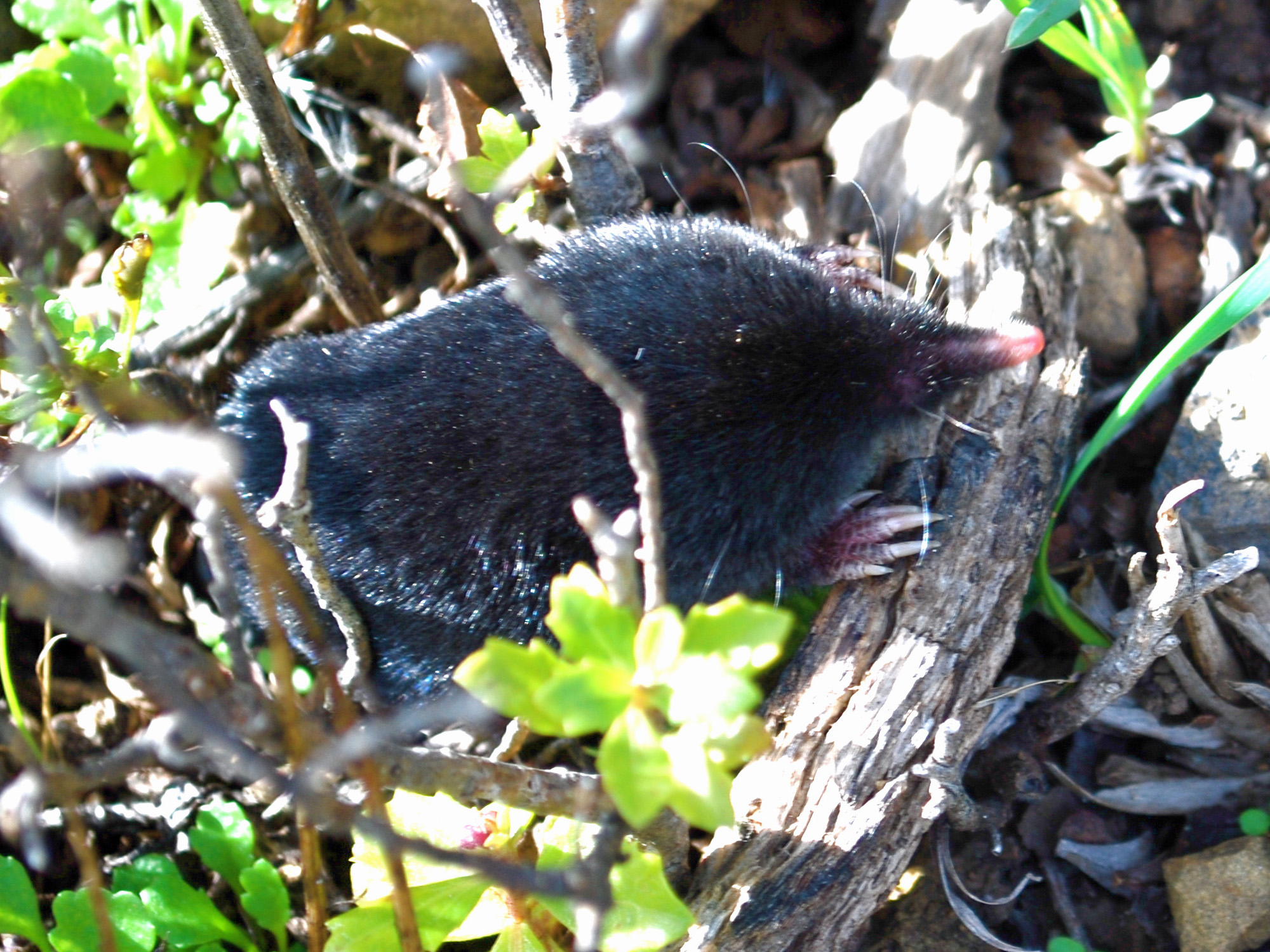
- Broad-footed mole (Scapanus latimanus)

Scientific classification
- Kingdom: Animalia
- Phylum: Chordata
- Class: Mammalia
- Order: Eulipotyphla
- Family: Talpidae
- Tribe: Scalopini
- Genus: Scapanus; Pomel, 1848

Type species
- Scalops townsendii

= Scapanus =

Scapanus Temporal range: 13.6–0 Ma Mid Miocene-Recent

Genus of mammals

Scapanus is a genus of moles in the family Talpidae. They live in North America from west of the Rockies south to Baja California del Norte, and north to British Columbia, wherever conditions permit a mole population; that is to say, apart from the most sandy, rocky, or developed places. As they are one genus, they are very closely related, but as species, they rarely if ever interbreed successfully.

It contains the following living species:

- Mexican mole (S. anthonyi)
- Northern broad-footed mole (S. latimanus)
- Southern broad-footed mole (S. occultus)
- Coast mole (S. orarius)
- Townsend's mole (S. townsendii)

In addition, there are several extinct species known from fossils.

- Scapanus hagermanensis (Mid Blancan stage, Idaho)
- Scapanus malatinus (Blancan-Quaternary, California)
- Scapanus proceridens (Miocene, Oregon and Idaho)
- Scapanus shultzi (Miocene, California and Oregon)

== Distribution ==
Broad-footed moles are primarily Californian, although its range spills over into neighboring states. The coast mole lives primarily in western Oregon, Washington, and southwestern British Columbia, where it often overlaps the smaller range of Townsend's mole. Townsend's mole is one of the largest and most powerful moles, while the coast mole is quite average-sized.
