= 2016 in paleomammalogy =

This paleomammalogy list records new fossil mammal taxa that were described during the year 2016, as well as notes other significant paleomammalogy discoveries and events which occurred during that year.

== Metatherians ==
=== Metatherian research ===
- A near-complete skull, a snout and two maxillae assigned to the species Didelphodon vorax are described from the Late Cretaceous Hell Creek Formation (Montana and North Dakota, United States) by Wilson et al. (2016).
- Description of a new specimen of Malleodectes mirabilis and a study of phylogenetic relationships of this species is published by Archer et al. (2016).
- A study on the shape of the elbow joint of Thylacoleo carnifex and its implications for the predatory behavior of the species is published by Figueirido, Martín-Serra & Janis (2016).
- Claw marks are described from the Tight Entrance Cave (southwestern Australia) by Arman & Prideaux (2016), who interpret the marks as left by the marsupial lions.
- A study evaluating whether the climate changes were the primary driver of Pleistocene megafauna extinctions in Australia is published by Saltré et al. (2016).

=== New taxa ===
Name	Novelty	Status	Authors	Age	Unit	Location	Notes	Images
Chaeropus baynesi	Sp. nov	Valid	Travouillon	Late Pliocene to early Pleistocene	Moorna Formation	Australia	A relative of the pig-footed bandicoot.	
Chimeralestes	Gen. et sp. nov	Valid	Engelman, Anaya & Croft	Miocene	Honda Group	Bolivia	A palaeothentid paucituberculate. Genus includes new species C. ambiguus.	
Cookeroo	Gen. et 2 sp. nov	Valid	Butler et al.	Oligocene-Miocene	Riversleigh World Heritage Area	Australia	A member of Macropodidae. Genus includes Cookeroo bulwidarri and Cookeroo hortusensis.	
Ektopodon tommosi	Sp. nov	Valid	Pledge	Late Oligocene	Namba Formation	Australia	A member of Phalangeroidea belonging to the family Ektopodontidae.	
Gumardee richi	Sp. nov	Valid	Travouillon et al.	Early Miocene	Riversleigh World Heritage Area	Australia	A member of Potoroinae.	
Gumardee springae	Sp. nov	Valid	Travouillon et al.	Late Oligocene	Riversleigh World Heritage Area	Australia	A member of Potoroinae.	
Gurbanodelta	Gen. et sp. nov		Ni et al.	Late Paleocene (Gashatan)		China	A probable member of the deltatheroidan family Deltatheridiidae. The type species is G. kara.	
Kutjamarcoot	Gen. et sp. nov	Valid	Chamberlain et al.	Early Miocene	Wipajiri Formation	Australia	A bandicoot. The type species is Kutjamarcoot brevirostrum.	
Lemdubuoryctes	Gen. et sp. nov	Valid	Kear, Aplin & Westerman	Latest Pleistocene to Holocene		Indonesia	Originally described as a member of the stem group of Peramelemorphia. The type species is L. aruensis. Travouillon & Phillips (2018) transferred this species to the genus Peroryctes.	
Microleo	Gen. et sp. nov	Valid	Gillespie, Archer & Hand	Early Miocene	Riversleigh World Heritage Area	Australia	A member of Thylacoleonidae. The type species is M. attenboroughi.	
Minusculodelphis modicum	Sp. nov	Valid	Oliveira, Zimicz & Goin	Itaboraian	Itaboraí Formation	Brazil	A member of Jaskhadelphyidae, a species of Minusculodelphis.	
Palaeothentes relictus	Sp. nov	Valid	Engelman, Anaya & Croft	Miocene	Honda Group	Bolivia	A palaeothentid paucituberculate.	
Palaeothentes serratus	Sp. nov	Valid	Engelman, Anaya & Croft	Miocene	Honda Group	Bolivia	A palaeothentid paucituberculate.	
Stelakoala	Gen. et sp. nov	Valid	Black	Middle Miocene	Riversleigh World Heritage Area	Australia	A member of Phascolarctidae. The type species is S. riversleighensis.	
Whollydooleya	Gen. et sp. nov	Valid	Archer et al.	Possibly middle or late Miocene		Australia	A member of Dasyuridae of uncertain phylogenetic placement. The type species is W. tomnpatrichorum.	

== Eutherians ==
=== Research ===
- A study on the date of the origin of the Placentalia and an analysis of the effect of the Cretaceous–Paleogene extinction event on placental evolution is published by Halliday, Upchurch & Goswami (2016).
- A study on the influence of the methods used to establish divergence dates on the studies reconstructing body-size evolution of the Cretaceous and Paleogene eutherian mammals is published by Halliday & Goswami (2016).
- A study on the relationship between the primary productivity of plant communities and the diversity of terrestrial large mammals in North America and Europe through the Neogene is published by Fritz et al. (2016).
- Studies of the phylogenetic relationships of the glyptodonts within Xenarthra, indicating that the glyptodonts were nested within the armadillo crown group, are published by Delsuc et al. (2016) and Mitchell et al. (2016).
- A description of new fossil material of Abdounodus hamdii and a study of its phylogenetic relationships is published by Gheerbrant, Filippo & Schmitt (2016).
- A description of new fossil material of Palaeoamasia kansui and a study of phylogenetic relationships of embrithopods is published by Erdal, Antoine & Sen (2016).
- A study on the patterns of mastication in Neogene and Quaternary proboscideans as indicated by the anatomy of their teeth is published by von Koenigswald (2016).
- Part of a humerus of a large proboscidean, probably a member of the genus Deinotherium, is described from the Miocene of Finland by Salonen et al., representing the northernmost record of a Miocene proboscidean fossil in the world so far.
- Presence of lower incisors is reported in immature individuals of Cuvieronius hyodon by Mothé, Ferretti & Avilla (2018).
- A study on the diet of Platybelodon grangeri, as indicated by data from molar microwear analysis of tooth enamel, is published by Semprebon et al. (2016).
- A study on the phylogenetic relationships and mitogenomic diversity of North American mammoths, as well as its implications for mammoth population structure and dynamics during the late Pleistocene, is published by Enk et al. (2016).
- A study on the timing, causes, and consequences of the Holocene extinction of the relict woolly mammoth population from Saint Paul Island (Alaska) is published by Graham et al. (2016).
- A study on the phylogenetic relationships of the unallocated fossil species of the Old World leaf-nosed bats, particularly Miocene species from Riversleigh (Australia) is published by Wilson et al. (2016).
- A complete skull of the macraucheniid Huayqueriana cf. H. cristata is described from the Huayquerian Huayquerías Formation (Argentina) by Forasiepi et al. (2016).
- A study on the dentaries of several juvenile specimens of Prosantorhinus germanicus from the Miocene fossil lagerstätte Sandelzhausen (Germany) is published by Böhmer, Heissig & Rössner (2016), who reconstruct the tooth replacement pattern, life history and juvenile mortality profile of this taxon.
- An osteological study on the Pleistocene camelid fossils reported from Alaska and Yukon, assigned to the species Camelops hesternus, is published by Zazula et al. (2016).
- New fossil material of the Pleistocene wildebeest-like bovid Rusingoryx atopocranion is described from the Rusinga Island (Kenya) by O'Brien et al. (2016), who note the presence of large, hollow, bony nasal crests in this mammal, similar to crests present in hadrosaurid dinosaurs.
- A study on the age and phylogenetic relationships of late Pleistocene bison fossils from North America and their implications for establishing when the Pleistocene ice free corridor along the eastern slopes of the Rocky Mountains was open is published by Heintzman et al. (2016).
- Studies on the origin and evolutionary history of the European bison based on ancient DNA recovered from bison fossils are published by Soubrier et al. (2016) and Massilani et al. (2016).
- A study on the diet and evolution of ecologically relevant traits in members of the genus Hoplitomeryx as indicated by tooth wear, hypsodonty and body mass estimations is published by DeMiguel (2016).
- Basu, Falkingham & Hutchinson (2016) present a reconstruction of the skeleton of Sivatherium giganteum and estimate adult body mass of members of the species.
- A study estimating the ability of the cetacean Ambulocetus and the desmostylians Paleoparadoxia, Neoparadoxia and Desmostylus to support themselves on land as indicated by the strengths of their rib cages against vertical compression is published by Ando & Fujiwara (2016).
- A study on the cochlear anatomy of a xenorophid specimen from the Oligocene Belgrade Formation in North Carolina (subsequently assigned to the genus Echovenator) and its implications for the evolution of high-frequency hearing and echolocation in early toothed whales is published by Park, Fitzgerald & Evans (2016).
- Description of an early Miocene dolphin from Kaikōura (New Zealand), closely related to Papahu taitapu, and a study of the phylogenetic relationships of Papahu is published by Tanaka & Fordyce (2016).
- Description of a new skull of the Pliocene porpoise Numataphocoena yamashitai recovered from the Horokaoshirarika Formation (Hokkaido, Japan) and a study on the phylogenetic relationships of the species is published by Tanaka & Ichishima (2016).
- A new aetiocetid specimen is described from the late Oligocene Pysht Formation (Washington, United States) by Marx et al. (2016), who interpret its tooth wear as inconsistent with the presence of baleen, and instead indicative of suction feeding.
- A study on the evolution of large body size in early baleen whale evolution is published by Tsai & Kohno (2016).
- A study on the anatomy of the ear region of Miocaperea pulchra and its implications for the proposed origin of the pygmy right whale from the cetotheriids is published by Marx & Fordyce (2016).
- A study on the baleen microstructures found in association with the skeleton of a late Miocene balaenopteroid whale recovered from the Pisco Formation (Peru) is published by Gioncada et al. (2016).
- A study on the anatomy and paleobiology of the Eocene pangolin Patriomanis americana is published by Gaudin, Emry & Morris (2016).
- A revision of the systematics of the North American members of Nimravidae is published by Barrett (2016).
- A study on the bone thickness of dentary bones of the specimens of Smilodon fatalis recovered from the La Brea Tar Pits and its implications for the changes in the diet of the saber-toothed cats through the time-periods that are captured at this site, is published by Binder, Cervantes & Meachen (2016).
- A study on the phylogenetic relationships of the cave lion, based on the first mitochondrial genome sequences for this taxon, is published by Barnett et al. (2016).
- A description of new bear dog fossils from the early Miocene of Uganda and Namibia and a systematic revision of the Miocene bear dogs known from Africa is published by Morales, Pickford & Valenciano (2016).
- A description of new fossil material of Megalictis ferox and a study of phylogenetic relationships of the oligobunine mustelids is published by Valenciano et al. (2016).
- A study on the feeding strategy of the arctoid Kolponomos is published by Tseng, Grohe & Flynn (2016).
- A study of phylogenetic relationships of bears belonging to the genus Arctotherium, indicating that they were more closely related to the spectacled bear than to short-faced bears, is published by Mitchell et al. (2016).
- A study on the anatomy of the auditory region of the Pleistocene bear Arctotherium tarijense is published by Arnaudo et al. (2016).
- A description of the most recent cave bear remains reported so far, recovered from the Stajnia Cave (Poland), and a study on the cave bear's extinction time is published by Baca et al. (2016).
- A study on the diet of the cave bears, as indicated by the morphology of their mandibles, is published by van Heteren et al. (2016).
- A study on the anatomy of Enaliarctos and its implications for the evolution of tooth spacing, tooth size and pierce-feeding in pinnipeds is published by Churchill & Clementz (2016).
- A study on the enamel ultrastructure in modern eared seals and extinct Pelagiarctos is published by Loch et al. (2016).
- Fossils of an earless seal belonging to the tribe Miroungini (the tribe containing elephant seals) are described from the late Pliocene Petane Formation (New Zealand) by Boessenecker & Churchill (2016), representing the oldest record of Miroungini reported so far.
- Virtual cranial endocasts of the Eocene rodents Paramys copei and Paramys delicatus are described by Bertrand, Amador-Mughal and Silcox (2016).
- The taxonomic revision of the fossil New World porcupines known from North America is published by Sussman et al. (2016), who transfer the species Erethizon kleini Frazier (1981) and Erethizon poyeri Hulbert (1997), as well as specimens previously identified as North American porcupines from Irvingtonian faunas in Florida and Aguascalientes, Mexico, to the genus Coendou.
- Virtual cranial endocasts of the notharctines Notharctus tenebrosus and Smilodectes gracilis, as well as the adapid adapiform Adapis parisiensis are reconstructed by Harrington et al. (2016).
- Eocene (Ypresian) adapoid and omomyid limb bones are described from the Vastan lignite mine (Gujarat, India) by Dunn et al. (2016).
- Isolated teeth of a member of the genus Cebus and a member of the genus Cebuella are described from the Miocene (Mayoan) Pebas Formation (Peru) by Marivaux et al. (2016).
- Fossils of the probable relative of the gorillas, Chororapithecus abyssinicus, are dated to ~8.0 Myr by Katoh et al. (2016).
- Fossils of Homo floresiensis and the deposits containing them are dated to between about 100 000 and 60 000 years ago by Sutikna et al. (2016).
- Hominin fossils similar in most dimensions and morphological characteristics to those of Homo floresiensis are described from the early Middle Pleistocene site in Flores, Indonesia by van den Bergh et al. (2016).
- A study on the cause of death of the Australopithecus afarensis specimen Lucy is published by Kappelman et al. (2016).
- A study on the bone structural properties of the femur and humerus of the Australopithecus afarensis specimen Lucy and its implications for the locomotor behavior and ecology of the species is published by Ruff et al. (2016).
- A study on the locomotor mechanics and footprint formation of the tracemaker of the Pliocene Laetoli footprints is published by Hatala, Demes & Richmond (2016).
- Pliocene hominin tracks discovered in the new site at Laetoli locality are described by Masao et al. (2016), who estimate the height of one of the trackmakers to be about 1.65 metres, thus exceeding previous estimates for Australopithecus afarensis.
- A study on the phylogenetic relationships of Homo naledi is published by Dembo et al. (2017).
- 1.5-million-year-old footprint assemblages produced by at least 20 different individuals of Homo erectus are described from multiple sites near Ileret, Kenya by Hatala et al. (2016).
- A study on the tracks of Homo erectus from Ileret, indicating repeated use of lakeshore habitats by members of this species, is published by Roach et al. (2016).
- A study on genomes of a Neanderthal and a Denisovan from the Altai Mountains in Siberia and on sequences of chromosome 21 of two Neanderthals from Spain and Croatia, and on their implications for the knowledge of gene flow events between modern and archaic humans, is published by Kuhlwilm et al. (2019).

=== New taxa ===
==== Xenarthrans ====
Name	Novelty	Status	Authors	Age	Unit	Location	Notes	Images
Aymaratherium	Gen. et sp. nov	Valid	Pujos et al.	Montehermosan	Umala Formation	Bolivia	A member of Nothrotheriidae. The type species is Aymaratherium jeani.	
Parutaetus punaensis	Sp. nov	Valid	Ciancio et al.	Middle–late Eocene	Geste Formation	Argentina	An armadillo belonging to the subfamily Euphractinae; a species of Parutaetus.	
Punatherium	Gen. et sp. nov	Valid	Ciancio et al.	Middle–late Eocene	Geste Formation	Argentina	An armadillo of uncertain phylogenetic placement. The type species is Punatherium catamarquensis.	

==== Afrotherians ====
Name	Novelty	Status	Authors	Age	Unit	Location	Notes	Images
Aphanobelodon	Gen. et sp. nov	Valid	Wang et al.	Middle Miocene	Zhangenbao Formation	China	A member of Amebelodontidae. The type species is A. zhaoi.	
Eurybelodon	Gen. et sp. nov	Valid	Lambert	Miocene (late Clarendonian)	Juntura Formation	United States (Oregon)	A gomphothere. The type species is Eurybelodon shoshanii.	
Konobelodon robustus	Sp. nov	Valid	Wang et al.	Late Miocene	Liushu Formation	China	A gomphothere, a species of Konobelodon.	
Lentiarenium	Gen. et comb. nov	Valid	Voss in Voss, Berning & Reiter	Oligocene (Chattian)	Linz-Melk Formation	Austria	A member of Sirenia belonging to the family Dugongidae. The type species is "Halitherium" cristolii Fitzinger (1842).	
Prototherium ausetanum	Sp. nov	Valid	Balaguer & Alba	Eocene		Spain	A member of Dugongidae, a species of Prototherium.	
Sinomammut	Gen. et sp. nov	Valid	Mothé et al.	Late Miocene	Xihe-Lixian Basin	China	A member of Mammutidae. The type species is Sinomammut tobieni.	
Sinomastodon praeintermedius	Sp. nov	Valid	Wang et al.	Late Miocene	Zhaotong Formation	China	A gomphothere, a species of Sinomastodon.	

==== Bats ====
Name	Novelty	Status	Authors	Age	Unit	Location	Notes	Images
Aegyptonycteris	Gen. et sp. nov	Valid	Simmons, Seiffert & Gunnell	Eocene (Priabonian)	Birket Qarun Formation	Egypt	An omnivorous bat belonging to the family Aegyptonycteridae. The type species is Aegyptonycteris knightae.	
Chambinycteris	Gen. et sp. nov	Valid	Ravel in Ravel et al.	Eocene		Tunisia	A bat of uncertain phylogenetic placement. The type species is C. pusilli.	
Drakonycteris	Gen. et sp. nov	Valid	Ravel in Ravel et al.	Eocene		Algeria	A bat of uncertain phylogenetic placement. The type species is D. glibzegdouensis.	
Hipposideros (Pseudorhinolophus) africanum	Sp. nov	Valid	Ravel in Ravel et al.	Eocene		Tunisia	A roundleaf bat.	
Hipposideros (Pseudorhinolophus) amenhotepos	Sp. nov	Valid	Gunnell et al.	Miocene		Egypt	A roundleaf bat.	
Khoufechia	Gen. et sp. nov	Valid	Ravel in Ravel et al.	Eocene		Tunisia	A member of Nycteridae. The type species is K. gunnelli.	
?Necromantis fragmentum	Sp. nov	Valid	Ravel in Ravel et al.	Eocene		Tunisia	A member of Necromantidae.	
?Palaeophyllophora tunisiensis	Sp. nov	Valid	Ravel in Ravel et al.	Eocene		Tunisia	A member of Hipposideridae.	
Premonycteris	Gen. et sp. nov	Valid	Hand et al.	Eocene (late Ypresian)		France	A vesper bat. The type species is P. vesper.	
Pseudovespertiliavus	Gen. et sp. nov	Valid	Ravel in Ravel et al.	Eocene		Algeria	A sac-winged bat. The type species is P. parva.	
Synemporion	Gen. et sp. nov	Valid	Ziegler, Howarth & Simmons	Middle Pleistocene to late Holocene		United States (Hawaii)	A vesper bat. The type species is Synemporion keana.	
?Vespertiliavus aenigma	Sp. nov	Valid	Ravel in Ravel et al.	Eocene		Tunisia	A sac-winged bat.	
Vespertiliavus kasserinensis	Sp. nov	Valid	Ravel in Ravel et al.	Eocene		Tunisia	A sac-winged bat.	

==== Odd-toed ungulates ====
Name	Novelty	Status	Authors	Age	Unit	Location	Notes	Images
Cadurcodon maomingensis	Sp. nov	Valid	Averianov et al.	Eocene	Youganwo Formation	China	A member of Amynodontidae.	
Hipparion philippus	Sp. nov	Valid	Koufos & Vlachou	Miocene (early Turolian)		Greece	A member of Equidae, a species of Hipparion.	
Hipparion sithonis	Sp. nov	Valid	Koufos & Vlachou	Miocene (early Turolian)		Greece	A member of Equidae, a species of Hipparion.	
Pappaceras meiomenus	Sp. nov		Wang et al.	Late Early Eocene	Arshanto Formation	China	A member of Rhinocerotoidea belonging to the family Paraceratheriidae.	
Propalaeotherium sudrei	Sp. nov	Valid	Remy, Krasovec & Marandat	Eocene		France	A member of Palaeotheriidae.	
Victoriaceros hooijeri	Sp. nov	Valid	Geraads et al.	Early Miocene		Kenya	A rhinoceros, tentatively assigned to the genus Victoriaceros.	
Xylotitan	Gen. et sp. nov	Valid	Mihlbachler & Samuels	Eocene	Clarno Formation	United States (Oregon)	A member of Brontotheriidae. Genus includes new species X. cenosus.	

==== Even-toed ungulates ====
Name	Novelty	Status	Authors	Age	Unit	Location	Notes	Images
Bransatochoerus	Gen. et comb. nov	Valid	Pickford			France	A member of Suoidea belonging to the family Doliochoeridae (previously called the Palaeochoeridae); a new genus for "Palaeocherus" meissneri mut. elaverensis Viret (1929) (in the rank of the species Bransatochoerus elaverensis).	
Celebochoerus cagayanensis	Sp. nov	Valid	Ingicco in Ingicco et al.	Middle Pleistocene	Awidon Mesa Formation	Philippines	A member of Suidae.	
Diplobunops kardoula	Sp. nov	Valid	Emery, Davis & Hopkins	Eocene (Duchesnean)		United States (Oregon)	An agriochoerid oreodont, a species of Diplobunops.	
Dorcatherium maliki	Sp. nov	Valid	Kostopoulos & Sen	Miocene (Vallesian)	Ergene Formation	Turkey	A chevrotain.	
Fremdohyus	Gen. et comb. nov	Valid	Prothero	Arikareean	John Day Formation	United States (Oregon)	A peccary. A new genus for "Thinohyus" osmonti Sinclair (1905).	
Honanotherium bernori	Sp. nov	Valid	Solounias & Danowitz	Late Miocene		Iran	A member of Giraffidae, a species of Honanotherium.	
Magwetherium	Gen. et sp. nov	Valid	Ducrocq et al.	Eocene	Pondaung Formation	Myanmar	A diacodexeid dichobunoid. The type species is Magwetherium burmense.	
Megaloceros stavropolensis	Sp. nov	Valid	Titov & Shvyreva	Early Pleistocene (late Villafranchian)		Russia (Stavropol Krai)	A deer. Originally described as a species of Megaloceros; Croitor (2018) transferred this species to the genus Arvernoceros.	
Nabotherium	Gen. et comb. nov	Valid	Sileem et al.	Early Oligocene	Jebel Qatrani Formation	Egypt	An anthracothere; a new genus for "Rhagatherium" aegyptiacum Andrews (1906).	
Prolibytherium fusus	Sp. nov	Valid	Danowitz, Domalski & Solounias	Early Miocene		Pakistan	A member of Ruminantia, a species of Prolibytherium.	
Protovis	Gen. et sp. nov	Valid	Wang, Li & Takeuchi	Pliocene	Zanda Basin	China	A relative of the sheep. The type species is Protovis himalayensis.	
Retroporcus	Gen. et comb. nov	Valid	Pickford	Miocene		Austria; France; Germany; India; Pakistan; Serbia; Spain; Switzerland; Turkey	A tetraconodontine suid. The type species is Retroporcus complutensis Pickford & Laurent (2014); genus also contains "Conohyus" sindiensis Lydekker, 1884 and Hyotherium soemmeringi matritensis Golpe-Posse, 1972 (recombined as a separate species Retroporcus matritensis). The generic name was originally published in an article from 2014, but without the diagnosis, necessitating its validation in a later publication.	

==== Cetaceans ====
Name	Novelty	Status	Authors	Age	Unit	Location	Notes	Images
Acrophyseter robustus	Sp. nov	Valid	Lambert, Bianucci & De Muizon	Miocene (late Serravallian–Tortonian)	Pisco Formation	Peru		
Arktocara	Gen. et sp. nov	Valid	Boersma & Pyenson	Oligocene (probably Chattian)	Poul Creek Formation	United States (Alaska)	A member of Platanistoidea related to Allodelphis. The type species is A. yakataga.	
Awadelphis	Gen. et sp. nov	Valid	Murakami	Latest Miocene	Senhata Formation	Japan	A member of Inioidea. The type species is A. hirayamai.	
Awamokoa	Gen. et sp. nov	Valid	Tanaka & Fordyce	Late Oligocene	Kokoamu Greensand	New Zealand	A member of Platanistoidea. The type species is A. tokarahi.	
Chavinziphius	Gen. et sp. nov	Valid	Bianucci et al.	Late Miocene	Pisco Formation	Peru	A beaked whale. The type species is C. maxillocristatus.	
Chimuziphius	Gen. et sp. nov	Valid	Bianucci et al.	Late Miocene	Pisco Formation	Peru	A beaked whale. The type species is C. coloradensis.	
Dagonodum	Gen. et sp. nov	Valid	Ramassamy	Late Miocene	Gram Formation	Denmark	A beaked whale. Genus includes new species D. mojnum.	
Echovenator	Gen. et sp. nov	Valid	Churchill et al.	Late Oligocene	Chandler Bridge Formation	United States (South Carolina)	A member of Xenorophidae. The type species is E. sandersi.	
Fragilicetus	Gen. et sp. nov	Valid	Bisconti & Bosselaers	Early Pliocene	Kattendijk Sands	Belgium; South Africa	A member of Balaenopteridae showing a mix of morphological characters that is intermediate between those of Eschrichtiidae and those of Balaenopteridae. The type species is Fragilicetus velponi.	
Goedertius	Gen. et. sp. nov	Valid	Kimura & Barnes	Miocene (late Aquitanian)	Nye Formation	United States (Oregon)	A member of Allodelphinidae. The type species is Goedertius oregonensis.	
Incakujira	Gen. et sp. nov	Valid	Marx & Kohno	Miocene	Pisco Formation	Peru	A rorqual. The type species is I. anillodefuego.	
Mammalodon hakataramea	Sp. nov	Valid	Fordyce & Marx	Oligocene (Duntroonian, 27 Ma)	Kokoamu Greensand	New Zealand	A species of Mammalodon, a member of Mammalodontidae.	
Matapanui	Gen. et sp. nov	Valid	Boessenecker & Fordyce	Oligocene (latest Whaingaroan, 28.1–27.3 Ma)	Kokoamu Greensand	New Zealand	A member of Eomysticetidae. The type species is M. waihao.	
Mesoplodon posti	Sp. nov	Valid	Lambert & Louwye	Pliocene (Zanclean)		Belgium	A mesoplodont whale.	
Metopocetus hunteri	Sp. nov	Valid	Marx, Bosselaers & Louwye	Miocene (late Tortonian)	Breda Formation	Netherlands	A member of Cetotheriidae, a species of Metopocetus.	
Mithridatocetus	Gen. et sp. et comb. nov	Valid	Gol'din & Startsev	Miocene (Tortonian)	Chersonian Formation	UkraineRussia	A member of Cetotheriidae. Genus includes new species M. eichwaldi, as well as "Kurdalagonus" adygeicus Tarasenko & Lopatin (2012) and "Cetotherium" mayeri (a nomen dubium).	
Ninjadelphis	Gen. et. sp. nov	Valid	Kimura & Barnes	Miocene (late Burdigalian)	Hiramatsu Formation	Japan	A member of Allodelphinidae. The type species is Ninjadelphis ujiharai.	
Rayanistes	Gen. et sp. nov	Valid	Bebej et al.	Eocene (Lutetian)	Midawara Formation	Egypt	A member of Remingtonocetidae. The type species is Rayanistes afer.	
Sitsqwayk	Gen. et sp. nov	Valid	Peredo & Uhen	Late Oligocene	Pysht Formation	United States (Washington)	A basal member of Chaeomysticeti. The type species is S. cornishorum.	
Whakakai	Gen. et sp. nov	Valid	Tsai & Fordyce	Oligocene (Chattian)	Kokoamu Greensand	New Zealand	A baleen whale. The type species is Whakakai waipata.	
Zarhinocetus donnamatsonae	Sp. nov	Valid	Kimura & Barnes	Miocene (late Burdigalian-early Langhian)	Astoria Formation	United States (Washington)	A member of Allodelphinidae.	

==== Carnivorans ====
Name	Novelty	Status	Authors	Age	Unit	Location	Notes	Images
Actiocyon parverratis	Sp. nov	Valid	Smith, Czaplewski & Cifelli	Miocene (Barstovian)	Monarch Mill Formation	United States (Nevada)	A simocyonine ailurid (a relative of the red panda), a species of Actiocyon.	
Alagtsavbaatar	Gen. et comb. nov	Valid	Egi et al.	Late Eocene	Ergilin Dzo Formation	Mongolia	A member of Feliformia. The type species is "Stenoplesictis" indigenus Dashzeveg (1996).	
Angelarctocyon	Gen. et comb. nov	Valid	Tomiya & Tseng	Eocene (Duchesnean)	Chambers Tuff	United States (Texas)	A bear dog. The type species is "Miacis" australis Gustafson (1986).	
Brevimalictis	Gen. et sp. nov	Valid	Smith, Czaplewski & Cifelli	Miocene (Barstovian)	Monarch Mill Formation	United States (Nevada)	A member of Mustelidae of uncertain phylogenetic placement. The type species is Brevimalictis chikasha.	
Cynarctus wangi	Sp. nov	Valid	Jasinski & Wallace	Middle Miocene	Choptank Formation	United States (Maryland)	A member of Canidae belonging to the subfamily Borophaginae, a species of Cynarctus.	
Enhydrictis hoffstetteri	Sp. nov	Valid	Geraads	Pleistocene		Algeria	An otter-like member of the Mustelidae.	
Gustafsonia	Gen. et comb. nov	Valid	Tomiya & Tseng	Eocene (Chadronian)	Chambers Tuff	United States (Texas)	A bear dog. The type species is "Miacis" cognitus Gustafson (1986).	
Lontra weiri	Sp. nov	Valid	Prassack	Pliocene	Hagerman Fossil Beds	United States (Idaho)	An otter, a species of Lontra.	
Lutraeximia	Gen. et sp. nov	Valid	Cherin et al.	Early Pleistocene (late Villafranchian)		Azerbaijan; Italy	An otter. The type species is Lutraeximia umbra.	
Maofelis	Gen. et sp. nov	Valid	Averianov et al.	Middle-late Eocene	Youganwo Formation	China	A member of Nimravidae. The type species is Maofelis cantonensis.	
Negodiaetictis	Gen. et sp. nov	Valid	Smith, Czaplewski & Cifelli	Miocene (Barstovian)	Monarch Mill Formation	United States (Nevada)	A member of Mustelidae of uncertain phylogenetic placement. The type species is Negodiaetictis rugatrulleum.	
Watay	Gen. et sp. nov	Valid	McLaughlin, Hopkins & Schmitz	Hemingfordian	Mascall Formation	United States (Oregon)	A member of Mustelidae. The type species is W. tabutsigwii.	

==== Rodents ====
Name	Novelty	Status	Authors	Age	Unit	Location	Notes	Images
Abudhabia abagensis	Sp. nov	Valid	Qiu & Li	Neogene		China	A gerbil related to members of the genus Taterillus.	
Abudhabia wangi	Sp. nov	Valid	Qiu & Li	Neogene		China	A gerbil related to members of the genus Taterillus.	
Allodistylomys	Gen. et sp. nov	Valid	Qiu & Li	Neogene		China	A member of the family Distylomyidae. Genus includes new species A. stepposus.	
Allohuaxiamys	Gen. et sp. nov	Valid	Qiu & Li	Neogene		China	A member of the family Muridae. Genus includes new species A. gaotegeensis.	
Ansomys borealis	Sp. nov	Valid	Qiu & Li	Neogene		China	A member of the family Aplodontiidae.	
Ansomys lophodens	Sp. nov	Valid	Qiu & Li	Neogene		China	A member of the family Aplodontiidae.	
Ansomys robustus	Sp. nov	Valid	Qiu & Li	Neogene		China	A member of the family Aplodontiidae.	
Apatodemus	Gen. et sp. nov	Valid	Savorelli, Colombero & Masini	Miocene		Italy	A member of Muridae. The type species is A. degiulii.	
Argouburus	Gen. et sp. nov	Valid	Marivaux et al.	Early Oligocene	Samlat Formation	Western Sahara	An anomalure. The type species is A. minutus.	
Atlantocerus exilis	Sp. nov	Valid	Qiu & Li	Neogene		China	A relative of the Barbary ground squirrel.	
Atlantocerus major	Sp. nov	Valid	Qiu & Li	Neogene		China	A relative of the Barbary ground squirrel.	
Ayakozomys mandaltensis	Sp. nov	Valid	Qiu & Li	Neogene		China	A muroid rodent belonging to the family Tachyoryctoididae.	
Ayakozomys ultimus	Sp. nov	Valid	Qiu & Li	Neogene		China	A muroid rodent belonging to the family Tachyoryctoididae.	
Birkamys	Gen. et sp. nov	Valid	Sallam & Seiffert	Eocene (late Priabonian)	Jebel Qatrani Formation	Egypt	A member of Phiomorpha of uncertain phylogenetic placement. The type species is Birkamys korai.	
Borsodia mengensis	Sp. nov	Valid	Qiu & Li	Neogene		China	A member of Arvicolinae.	
Brachyscirtetes tomidai	Sp. nov	Valid	Li	Late Miocene		China	A member of Dipodidae, a species of Brachyscirtetes.	
Chambiramys	Gen. et 2 sp. nov	Valid	Boivin et al.	Late Oligocene	Chambira Formation	Peru	A caviomorph rodent of uncertain phylogenetic placement. The type species is C. sylvaticus; genus also includes C. shipiborum.	
Chukimys	Gen. et sp. nov	Valid	Barbiere et al.	Late Pliocene	Brochero Formation	Argentina	A member of Sigmodontinae. The type species is C. favaloroi.	
Colloides	Gen. et sp. nov	Valid	Qiu & Li	Neogene		China	A cricetid rodent. Genus includes new species C. xiaomingi.	
Cricetodon fengi	Sp. nov	Valid	Qiu & Li	Neogene		China	A cricetid rodent.	
Cricetodon fikreti	Sp. nov	Valid	Çinar Durgut & Ünay	Early Miocene		Turkey	A member of Cricetodontini.	
Cricetodon magnesiensis	Sp. nov	Valid	Çinar Durgut & Ünay	Early Miocene		Turkey	A member of Cricetodontini.	
Cricetodon sonidensis	Sp. nov	Valid	Qiu & Li	Neogene		China	A cricetid rodent.	
Cricetodon trallesensis	Sp. nov	Valid	Çinar Durgut & Ünay	Early Miocene		Turkey	A member of Cricetodontini.	
Cricetodon yapintiensis	Sp. nov	Valid	Çinar Durgut & Ünay	Early Miocene		Turkey	A member of Cricetodontini.	
Dakhlamys	Gen. et sp. nov	Valid	Marivaux et al.	Early Oligocene	Samlat Formation	Western Sahara	A possible member of Zegdoumyidae. The type species is D. ultimus.	
Dehmisciurus	Gen. et comb. nov	Valid	Marković, de Bruijn & Wessels	Late Oligocene – Early Miocene		Austria; Bosnia and Herzegovina; Germany; Serbia; Spain; Turkey	A member of the family Sciuridae. The type species is "Ratufa" obtusidens Dehm (1950).	
Dipoides mengensis	Sp. nov	Valid	Qiu & Li	Neogene		China	A member of the family Castoridae.	
Dipus nanus	Sp. nov	Valid	Qiu & Li	Neogene		China	A relative of the northern three-toed jerboa.	
Dipus pliocenicus	Sp. nov	Valid	Qiu & Li	Neogene		China	A relative of the northern three-toed jerboa.	
Dolocylindrodon	Gen. et 2 sp. et comb. nov	Valid	Korth & Tabrum	Eocene-Oligocene		United States (Montana; Texas; Wyoming)	A member of Cylindrodontidae. The type species is D. vukae; genus also includes new species D. rahnensis, as well as "Pseudocylindrodon" medius Burke (1938), "Pseudocylindrodon" tobeyi Black (1970) and "Pseudocylindrodon" texanus Wood (1974).	
Elfomys catalaunicus	Sp. nov	Valid	Bonilla-Salomón et al.	Eocene		Spain	A member of Theridomyidae, a species of Elfomys.	
Ellobius (Bramus) pomeli	Sp. nov	Valid	Tesakov	Early Middle Pleistocene	Arapi Formation	Armenia	A species of Ellobius.	
Elymys ? emryi	Sp. nov	Valid	Kelly & Murphey	Eocene (early Uintan)	Turtle Bluff Member, Bridger Formation	United States (Wyoming)	A possible member of Dipodidae.	
Eozapus major	Sp. nov	Valid	Qiu & Li	Neogene		China	A relative of the Chinese jumping mouse.	
Eucastor plionicus	Sp. nov	Valid	Qiu & Li	Neogene		China	A member of the family Castoridae.	
Eucricetodon wangae	Sp. nov	Valid	Li, Meng & Wang	Late Eocene		China	A member of Cricetidae, a species of Eucricetodon.	
Eutypomys productus	Sp. nov	Valid	Korth	Oligocene (Whitneyan)		United States (South Dakota)	A member of the family Eutypomyidae.	
Geomys tyrioni	Sp. nov	Valid	Martin	Early Pleistocene	Meade Basin	United States (Kansas)	A pocket gopher, a species of Geomys.	
Gliruloides	Gen. et sp. et comb. nov	Valid	Wu et al.	Late Oligocene to early Miocene	Junggar Basin	China; Turkey	A dormouse related to the forest dormouse. The type species is Gliruloides zhoui; genus also includes "Vasseuromys" duplex Ünay (1994).	
Gobicricetodon arshanensis	Sp. nov	Valid	Qiu & Li	Neogene		China	A cricetid rodent.	
Hylopetes bellus	Sp. nov	Valid	Qiu & Li	Neogene		China	A squirrel, a species of Hylopetes.	
Hylopetes yani	Sp. nov	Valid	Qiu & Li	Neogene		China	A squirrel, a species of Hylopetes.	
Hystricops mengensis	Sp. nov	Valid	Qiu & Li	Neogene		China	A member of the family Castoridae.	
Irtyshogaulus	Gen. et 2 sp. nov	Valid	Lu et al.	Early Miocene	Junggar Basin	China	A member of Mylagaulidae belonging to the subfamily Promylagaulinae. The type species is I. minor; genus also includes I. major.	
Karnimatoides	Gen. et comb. nov	Valid	Qiu & Li	Neogene		China	A member of Murinae. The type species is K. hipparionus (Schlosser, 1924).	
Keramidomys magnus	Sp. nov	Valid	Qiu & Li	Neogene		China	A member of the family Eomyidae.	
Khanomys	Gen. et 2 sp. nov	Valid	Qiu & Li	Neogene		China	A cricetid rodent. Genus includes new species K. baii and K. cheni.	
Kowalskia shalaensis	Sp. nov	Valid	Qiu & Li	Neogene		China	A cricetid rodent.	
Lagostomus telenkechanum	Sp. nov	Valid	Rasia & Candela	Late Miocene	Arroyo Chasicó Formation	Argentina	A species of Lagostomus.	
Ligerimys asiaticus	Sp. nov	Valid	Qiu & Li	Neogene		China	A member of the family Eomyidae.	
Loretomys	Gen. et sp. nov	Valid	Boivin et al.	Late Oligocene	Chambira Formation	Peru	A caviomorph rodent belonging to the superfamily Octodontoidea. The type species is L. minutus.	
Megacricetodon hellenicus	Sp. nov	Valid	Oliver & Peláez-Campomanes	Early Miocene		Greece	A cricetid rodent, a species of Megacricetodon.	
Metaeucricetodon	Gen. et sp. nov	Valid	Qiu & Li	Neogene		China	A cricetid rodent. Genus includes new species M. mengicus.	
Microtocricetus shalaensis	Sp. nov	Valid	Qiu & Li	Neogene		China	A cricetid rodent.	
Microtoscoptes fahlbuschi	Sp. nov	Valid	Qiu & Li	Neogene		China	A cricetid rodent.	
Mioheteromys subterior	Sp. nov	Valid	Korth & Evander	Miocene (early Barstovian)		United States (Nebraska)	A heteromyid rodent, a species of Mioheteromys.	
Mimomys chandolensis	Sp. nov	Valid	Tiunov, Golenishchev & Voyta	Late Pleistocene		Russia (Primorsky Krai)	An arvicoline cricetid, a species of Mimomys.	
Mimomys teilhardi	Sp. nov	Valid	Qiu & Li	Neogene		China	A member of Arvicolinae.	
Minocastor	Gen. et sp. nov	Valid	Mörs, Tomida & Kalthoff	Early Miocene	Nakamura Formation	Japan	A member of Castoridae. The type species is Minocastor godai.	
Mubhammys	Gen. et sp. nov	Valid	Sallam & Seiffert	Eocene (late Priabonian)	Jebel Qatrani Formation	Egypt	A member of Phiomorpha of uncertain phylogenetic placement. The type species is Mubhammys vadumensis.	
Myocricetodon tomidai	Sp. nov	Valid	Lindsay & Flynn	Early Miocene	Chitarwata Formation; Vihowa Formation	Pakistan	A member of Cricetidae, a species of Myocricetodon.	
Mystemys	Gen. et sp. nov	Valid	Savorelli & Masini	Miocene		Italy	A member of Cricetidae. The type species is M. giganteus.	
Neochoerus occidentalis	Sp. nov.	Valid	Carranza-Castañeda	Late Blancan-Irvingtonian		Mexico		
Nonanomalurus parvus	Sp. nov	Valid	Marivaux et al.	Early Oligocene	Samlat Formation	Western Sahara	A member of Anomaluroidea.	
?Notoparamys blochi	Sp. nov	Valid	Gunnell, Zonneveld & Bartels	Wasatchian	Wasatch Formation	United States (Wyoming)	A member of Ischyromyidae belonging to the subfamily Paramyinae, tentatively assigned to the genus Notoparamys.	
Orientiglis	Gen. et comb. nov	Valid	Qiu & Li	Neogene		China	A dormouse related to members of the genus Dryomys. Genus includes O. wuae (Qiu, 1996).	
Oromys	Gen. et sp. nov	Valid	Marivaux et al.	Early Oligocene	Samlat Formation	Western Sahara	A member of Zenkerellinae. The type species is O. zenkerellinopsis.	
Paciculus walshi	Sp. nov	Valid	Lindsay et al.	Oligocene	Otay Formation	United States (California)	A member of Cricetidae, a species of Paciculus.	
Palaeosciurus aoerbanensis	Sp. nov	Valid	Qiu & Li	Neogene		China	A ground squirrel.	
Palaeosteiromys	Gen. et sp. nov	Valid	Boivin et al.	Late Oligocene	Chambira Formation	Peru	A New World porcupine. The type species is P. amazonensis.	
Pappocricetodon siziwangqiensis	Sp. nov	Valid	Li, Meng & Wang	Late Eocene		China	A member of Cricetidae, a species of Pappocricetodon.	
Paradelomys santjaumensis	Sp. nov	Valid	Bonilla-Salomón et al.	Eocene		Spain	A member of Theridomyidae, a species of Paradelomys.	
Paralactaga parvidens	Sp. nov	Valid	Qiu & Li	Neogene		China	A member of Dipodidae related to members of the genus Allactaga.	
Paralactaga shalaensis	Sp. nov	Valid	Qiu & Li	Neogene		China	A member of Dipodidae related to members of the genus Allactaga.	
Parameniscomys	Gen. et sp. nov	Valid	Qiu & Li	Neogene		China	A member of the family Aplodontiidae. Genus includes new species P. mengensis.	
Paranomalurus riodeoroensis	Sp. nov	Valid	Marivaux et al.	Early Oligocene	Samlat Formation	Western Sahara	An anomalure.	
Paratheridomys	Gen. et comb. nov	Valid	Vianey-Liaud & Marivaux	Oligocene		Belgium; France; Germany; Switzerland	A member of Theridomyidae. The type species is "Theridomys" ludensis Vianey-Liaud (1985); genus also includes P. margaritae (Vianey-Liaud, 1989) and P. vassoni (Pomel, 1853).	
Pentabuneomys fejfari	Sp. nov	Valid	Qiu & Li	Neogene		China	A member of the family Eomyidae.	
Plesiodipus robustus	Sp. nov	Valid	Qiu & Li	Neogene		China	A cricetid rodent.	
Plesiosciurus zhengi	Sp. nov	Valid	Qiu & Jin	Cenozoic (probably Miocene)		China	A member of Sciurini.	
Plesiosteiromys	Gen. et sp. nov	Valid	Boivin et al.	Late Oligocene	Chambira Formation	Peru	A caviomorph rodent, possibly a New World porcupine. The type species is P. newelli.	
Postcopemys chapalensis	Sp. nov	Valid	Rincón et al.	Early Pliocene	Chapala Formation	Mexico	A member of Cricetidae.	
Potamarchus adamiae	Sp. nov	Valid	Kerber et al.	Late Miocene	Solimões Formation	Brazil	A potamarchine dinomyid, a species of Potamarchus.	
Potwarmus mahmoodi	Sp. nov	Valid	Lindsay & Flynn	Early Miocene	Vihowa Formation	Pakistan	A member of Cricetidae, a species of Potwarmus.	
Primus cheemai	Sp. nov	Valid	Lindsay & Flynn	Late Oligocene to Early Miocene	Chitarwata Formation; Vihowa Formation	Pakistan	A member of Cricetidae, a species of Primus.	
Proansomys badamae	Sp. nov	Valid	Maridet et al.	Late Oligocene	Hsanda Gol Formation	Mongolia	A member of Aplodontiidae.	
Prodistylomys mengensis	Sp. nov	Valid	Qiu & Li	Neogene		China	A member of the family Distylomyidae.	
Progonomys shalaensis	Sp. nov	Valid	Qiu & Li	Neogene		China	A member of the family Muridae.	
Protalactaga lophodens	Sp. nov	Valid	Qiu & Li	Neogene		China	A member of Dipodidae related to members of the genus Allactaga.	
Pseudaplodon amuwusuensis	Sp. nov	Valid	Qiu & Li	Neogene		China	A member of the family Aplodontiidae.	
Pseudopotamarchus	Gen. et sp. nov	Valid	Kerber et al.	Late Miocene	Solimões Formation	Brazil	A potamarchine dinomyid. The type species is Pseudopotamarchus villanuevai.	
Pseudoratufa	Gen. et sp. nov	Valid	Qiu & Jin	Cenozoic (probably Miocene)		China	A relative of the oriental giant squirrels. The type species is P. wanensis.	
Quadrimys	Gen. et sp. nov	Valid	Qiu & Li	Neogene		China	A member of the family Aplodontiidae. Genus includes new species Q. paradoxus.	
Rhinocerodon abagensis	Sp. nov	Valid	Qiu & Li	Neogene		China	A cricetid rodent.	
Sayimys negevensis	Sp. nov	Valid	López-Antoñanzas et al.	Early Miocene	Middle Hatzeva Formation	Israel	A gundi, a species of Sayimys.	
Scleromys praecursor	Sp. nov	Valid	Boivin et al.	Late Oligocene	Chambira Formation	Peru	A caviomorph rodent belonging to the superfamily Chinchilloidea. Originally described as a species of Scleromys; subsequently made the type species of a separate genus Maquiamys.	
Sicista bilikeensis	Sp. nov	Valid	Qiu & Li	Neogene		China	A birch mouse.	
Sicista ertemteensis	Sp. nov	Valid	Qiu & Li	Neogene		China	A birch mouse.	
Sinozapus parvus	Sp. nov	Valid	Qiu & Li	Neogene		China	A jumping mouse.	
Sonidomys	Gen. et sp. nov	Valid	Qiu & Li	Neogene		China	A cricetid rodent. Genus includes new species S. deligeri.	
Spermophilinus mongolicus	Sp. nov	Valid	Qiu & Li	Neogene		China	A relative of the chipmunks.	
Tachyoryctoides colossus	Sp. nov	Valid	Qiu & Li	Neogene		China	A muroid rodent belonging to the family Tachyoryctoididae.	
Tachyoryctoides vulgatus	Sp. nov	Valid	Qiu & Li	Neogene		China	A muroid rodent belonging to the family Tachyoryctoididae.	
Tamiops minor	Sp. nov	Valid	Qiu & Li	Neogene		China	An Asiatic striped squirrel.	
Ucayalimys	Gen. et sp. nov	Valid	Boivin et al.	Late Oligocene	Chambira Formation	Peru	A caviomorph rodent, possibly a member of the superfamily Chinchilloidea. The type species is U. crassidens.	
Ullumys	Gen. et sp. et comb. nov	Valid	Olivares et al.	Miocene (Huayquerian)	Las Tapias Formation	Argentina	A member of Echimyidae. Genus includes new species U. pattoni, as well as "Eumysops" intermedius Rovereto.	

==== Primates ====
Name	Novelty	Status	Authors	Age	Unit	Location	Notes	Images
Agerinia smithorum	Sp. nov	Valid	Femenias-Gual et al.	Early Eocene		Spain		
Apidium zuetina	Sp. nov	Valid	Beard et al.	Early Oligocene		Libya	A species of Apidium.	
Bahinia banyueae	Sp. nov	Valid	Ni et al.	Early Oligocene	Caijiachong Formation	China	A member of Eosimiidae, a species of Bahinia.	
Canaanimico	Gen. et sp. nov	Valid	Marivaux et al.	Late Oligocene	Chambira Formation	Peru	A New World monkey related to Soriacebus. The type species is C. amazonensis.	
Cantius lohseorum	Sp. nov	Valid	Robinson	Early Eocene	Powder River Basin	United States (Wyoming)	A member of Notharctidae.	
Gatanthropus	Gen. et sp. nov	Valid	Ni et al.	Early Oligocene	Caijiachong Formation	China	A relative of Ekgmowechashala. The type species is Gatanthropus micros.	
Laomaki	Gen. et sp. nov	Valid	Ni et al.	Early Oligocene	Caijiachong Formation	China	A member of Adapiformes belonging to the family Sivaladapidae. The type species is Laomaki yunnanensis.	
Megaceralemur	Gen. et comb. et sp. nov	Valid	Robinson	Eocene		United States (Wyoming)	A member of Notharctidae. A new genus for "Pelycodus" trigonodus Matthew (1915); genus also includes new species M. matthewi.	
Oligotarsius	Gen. et sp. nov	Valid	Ni et al.	Early Oligocene	Caijiachong Formation	China	A tarsier-like primate. The type species is Oligotarsius rarus.	
Panamacebus	Gen. et sp. nov	Valid	Bloch et al.	Early Miocene	Las Cascadas Formation	Panama	A New World monkey, probably a member of Cebidae. The type species is Panamacebus transitus.	
Pinolophus	Gen. et sp. nov	Valid	Robinson	Eocene		United States (Wyoming)	A member of Notharctidae. The type species P. meikei.	
Semnopithecus gwebinensis	Sp. nov	Valid	Takai et al.	Late Pliocene		Myanmar	A gray langur.	
Yunnanadapis	Gen. et 2 sp. nov	Valid	Ni et al.	Early Oligocene	Caijiachong Formation	China	A member of Adapiformes belonging to the family Sivaladapidae. The type species is Yunnanadapis folivorus; genus also includes Yunnanadapis imperator.	

==== Other eutherians ====
Name	Novelty	Status	Authors	Age	Unit	Location	Notes	Images
Akhnatenavus nefertiticyon	Sp. nov	Valid	Borths, Holroyd & Seiffert	Eocene (latest Priabonian)	Jebel Qatrani Formation	Egypt	A hyainailourine hyaenodont.	
Amphilagus tomidai	Sp. nov	Valid	Erbajeva, Angelone & Alexeeva	Miocene		Russia (Irkutsk Oblast)	A lagomorph, a species of Amphilagus.	
Antesorex wilsoni	Sp. nov	Valid	Korth & Evander	Miocene (early Barstovian)		United States (Nebraska)	A shrew, a species of Antesorex.	
Belgoryctes	Gen. et sp. nov	Valid	De Bast & Smith	Paleocene	Hainin Formation	Belgium	A member of Palaeoryctidae. The type species is B. thaleri.	
Brychotherium	Gen. et sp. nov	Valid	Borths, Holroyd & Seiffert	Eocene (latest Priabonian)	Jebel Qatrani Formation	Egypt	A teratodontine hyaenodont. The type species is B. ephalmos.	
Cambaytherium gracilis	Sp. nov	Valid	Smith et al.	Eocene (Ypresian)	Cambay Shale Formation	India	A perissodactyl-like ungulate.	
Cingulodon	Gen. et sp. nov	Valid	De Bast & Smith	Paleocene	Hainin Formation	Belgium	A eutherian of uncertain phylogenetic placement, possibly a member of the family Louisinidae. The type species is C. magioncaldai.	
Eoictops	Gen. et sp. nov	Valid	Gunnell, Zonneveld & Bartels	Wasatchian	Wasatch Formation	United States (Wyoming)	A member of Leptictida belonging to the family Leptictidae. The type species is E. novaceki.	
Eurolestes	Gen. et sp. nov	Valid	De Bast & Smith	Paleocene	Hainin Formation	Belgium	A member of Pantolesta belonging to the family Pentacodontidae. The type species is E. dupuisi.	
Gomphos progressus	Sp. nov	Valid	Li, Wang & Fostowicz-Frelik	Eocene (Irdinmanhan)	Ulan Shireh Formation	China	A member of Glires belonging to the family Mimotonidae.	
Hegetotherium cerdasensis	Sp. nov	Valid	Croft et al.	Miocene (Langhian)	Cerdas beds	Bolivia	A notoungulate, a species of Hegetotherium.	
Indoesthonyx	Gen. et sp. nov	Valid	Smith et al.	Eocene (Ypresian)	Cambay Shale Formation	India	A member of Tillodontia. The type species is I. suratensis.	
Lanthanotherium observatum	Sp. nov	Valid	Korth & Evander	Miocene (early Barstovian)		United States (Nebraska)	A member of Erinaceidae, a species of Lanthanotherium.	
Mina	Gen. et sp. nov	Junior homonym	Li et al.	Middle Paleocene	Wanghudun Formation	China	A basal member of Glires. The type species is Mina hui. The generic name is preoccupied by Mina Walker (1858); Deshmukh (2026) coined a replacement name Chowa.	
Ounalashkastylus	Gen. et sp. nov	Valid	Chiba et al.	Miocene		United States (Alaska)	A desmostylian. The type species is Ounalashkastylus tomidai.	
Palaeictops altimontis	Sp. nov	Valid	Velazco & Novacek	Eocene (Uintan)	Tepee Trail Formation	United States (Wyoming)	A member of Leptictida belonging to the family Leptictidae.	
Palaeictops robustus	Sp. nov	Valid	Velazco & Novacek	Eocene (Uintan)	Uinta Formation	United States (Utah)	A member of Leptictida belonging to the family Leptictidae.	
Palaeosinopa lacus	Sp. nov	Valid	Gunnell, Zonneveld & Bartels	Wasatchian	Wasatch Formation	United States (Wyoming)	A member of Pantolestidae.	
Pternoconius bondi	Sp. nov	Valid	Cheme Arriaga, Dozo & Gelfo	Miocene (Colhuehuapian)	Sarmiento Formation	Argentina	A member of Litopterna belonging to the family Macraucheniidae and the subfamily Cramaucheniinae.	
Ptilocercus kylin	Sp. nov	Valid	Li & Ni	Earliest Oligocene	Lijiawa Mammalian Fossil locality	China	A treeshrew related to the pen-tailed treeshrew.	
Purgatorius pinecreeensis	Sp. nov	Valid	Scott, Fox & Redman	Paleocene (Puercan)	Ravenscrag Formation	Canada (Saskatchewan)		
Quadratodon	Gen. et sp. nov	Valid	De Bast & Smith	Paleocene	Hainin Formation	Belgium	A eutherian of uncertain phylogenetic placement, possibly a member of Erinaceomorpha. The type species is Q. sigei.	
Rzebikia	Gen. et comb. nov	Valid	Sansalone, Kotsakis & Piras	Pliocene to Pleistocene (Villanyian)		Bulgaria; Poland	A relative of the American shrew mole. A new genus for "Neurotrichus" polonicus Skoczeń (1980) and "Neurotrichus" skoczeni Zijlstra (2010).	
Sanshuilophus	Gen. et sp. nov	Valid	Mao et al.	Early Eocene	Huayong Formation	China	A member of Phenacolophidae (a group of archaic ungulate mammals of uncertain phylogenetic placement). The type species is Sanshuilophus zhaoi.	
Scalopoides hutchisoni	Sp. nov	Valid	Korth & Evander	Miocene (early Barstovian)		United States (Nebraska)	A member of Talpidae, a species of Scalopoides.	
Trachytherus ramirezi	Sp. nov	Valid	Shockey, Billet & Salas-Gismondi	Oligocene (Deseadan)	Moquegua Formation	Peru	A mesotheriid notoungulate, a species of Trachytherus.	
Vassacyon prieuri	Sp. nov	Valid	Solé et al.	Latest Paleocene		France	A basal member of Carnivoraformes, a species of Vassacyon.	
Zofialestes	Gen. et sp. nov	Valid	Fostowicz-Frelik	Late Cretaceous (?late Campanian)	Barun Goyot Formation	Mongolia	A relative of Zalambdalestes. The type species is Z. longidens.	

== Other mammals ==
=== Research ===
- A study on the differences in cusp arrangement on the surface of molars of Morganucodon and Kuehneotherium and its impact on ability of the teeth to fracture prey is published by Conith et al. (2016).
- Description of a new specimen of Kollikodon ritchiei and a study of its phylogenetic relationships is published by Pian et al. (2016).
- A redescription of Teinolophos trusleri is published by Rich et al. (2016).
- A study comparing the skull anatomy of the extant platypus and the Miocene Obdurodon dicksoni is published by Asahara et al. (2016).
- A partial mandible of the amphitheriid Palaeoxonodon ooliticus, previously known only from isolated teeth, is described from the Middle Jurassic (late Bathonian) Kilmaluag Formation (Isle of Skye, Scotland, United Kingdom) by Close et al. (2016).
- A study on the morphological disparity, dietary trends and generic level taxonomic diversity patterns in early therians is published by Grossnickle & Newham (2016).

=== New taxa ===
Name	Novelty	Status	Authors	Age	Unit	Location	Notes	Images
Anebodon	Gen. et sp. nov	Valid	Bi et al.	Early Cretaceous	Yixian Formation	China	A symmetrodont belonging to the family Zhangheotheriidae. The type species is A. luoi.	
Cherwellia	Gen. et sp. nov	Valid	Butler & Sigogneau-Russell	Middle Jurassic (late Bathonian)		United Kingdom	A possible member of Morganucodonta. The type species is C. leei.	
Culicolestes	Gen. et sp. nov	Valid	Cifelli, Cohen & Davis	Late Cretaceous (Cenomanian)	Cedar Mountain Formation	United States (Utah)	A member of Tribosphenida of uncertain phylogenetic placement. The type species is C. kielanae.	
Dakotadens pertritus	Sp. nov	Valid	Cifelli, Cohen & Davis	Late Cretaceous (Cenomanian)	Cedar Mountain Formation	United States (Utah)	A member of Tribosphenida of uncertain phylogenetic placement.	
Eotriconodon	Gen. et sp. nov	Valid	Butler & Sigogneau-Russell	Middle Jurassic (late Bathonian)		United Kingdom	A member of Triconodontidae. The type species is E. sophron.	
Gobiconodon bathoniensis	Sp. nov	Valid	Butler & Sigogneau-Russell	Middle Jurassic (late Bathonian)		United Kingdom		
Lactodens	Gen. et sp. nov	Valid	Han & Meng	Early Cretaceous		China	A 'symmetrodont' related to Spalacolestes. Genus includes new species L. sheni.	
Mangasbaatar	Gen. et sp. nov	Valid	Rougier et al.	Late Cretaceous (probably late Campanian)		Mongolia	A djadochtatheriid multituberculate. The type species is M. udanii.	
Morganucodon tardus	Sp. nov	Valid	Butler & Sigogneau-Russell	Middle Jurassic (late Bathonian)		United Kingdom		
Phascolotherium simpsoni	Sp. nov	Valid	Butler & Sigogneau-Russell	Middle Jurassic (late Bathonian)		United Kingdom	A member of Eutriconodonta.	
Stylidens	Gen. et sp. nov	Valid	Butler & Sigogneau-Russell	Middle Jurassic (late Bathonian)		United Kingdom	A possible member of Morganucodonta. The type species is S. hookeri.	
Teutonodon	Gen. et sp. nov	Valid	Martin et al.	Late Jurassic (Kimmeridgian)		Germany	A plagiaulacid multituberculate. The type species is T. langenbergensis.	
Theroteinus rosieriensis	Sp. nov	Valid	Debuysschere	Late Triassic (Rhaetian)		France	A member of Haramiyida belonging to the family Theroteinidae.	
