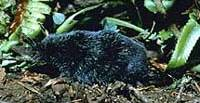
- Shrew-mole (Neurotrichus gibbsii)

Scientific classification
- Kingdom: Animalia
- Phylum: Chordata
- Class: Mammalia
- Order: Eulipotyphla
- Family: Talpidae
- Tribe: Neurotrichini
- Genus: Neurotrichus; Günther, 1880

Type species
- Urotrichus gibbsii Baird, 1858

Species
- Neurotrichus gibbsii; †Neurotrichus columbianus?

= Neurotrichus =

Genus of mammals

Neurotrichus is a genus of shrew-like moles. It is classified, together with the fossil genus Quyania, in the tribe Neurotrichini of the subfamily Talpinae. The only living species is the American shrew-mole (N. gibbsii) of the northwestern United States and British Columbia. A fossil species, Neurotrichus columbianus from the Hemphillian of Oregon, was placed in the genus in 1968, but this animal is now thought to be more closely related to the Chinese fossil genus Yanshuella.

Two fossil species from the Plio-Pleistocene of Poland known as Neurotrichus polonicus and Neurotrichus skoczeni were placed in a new genus, Rzebikia.

== Literature cited ==
- Carraway, L.N. and Verts, B.J. 1991. Neurotrichus gibbsii. Mammalian Species 387:1–7.
- Hutterer, R. 2005. Order Soricomorpha. Pp. 220–311 in Wilson, D.E. and Reeder, D.M. (eds.). Mammal Species of the World: a taxonomic and geographic reference. 3rd ed. Baltimore: The Johns Hopkins University Press, 2 vols., 2142 pp. ISBN 978-0-8018-8221-0
- Zijlstra, J.S. 2010. Neurotrichus skoczeni, new name for Neurotrichus minor Skoczen, 1993, preoccupied. Journal of Vertebrate Paleontology 30(6):1903.
