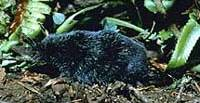
- American shrew mole (Neurotrichus gibbsii)

Scientific classification
- Kingdom: Animalia
- Phylum: Chordata
- Class: Mammalia
- Order: Eulipotyphla
- Family: Talpidae
- Subfamily: Talpinae
- Tribe: Neurotrichini; Hutterer, 2005

Genera
- Neurotrichus; †Quyania; †Rzebikia

= Neurotrichini =

Tribe of mammals

Neurotrichini is a tribe within the subfamily Talpinae of the mole family. It includes the living genus Neurotrichus with a single living species, the American shrew-mole (Neurotrichus gibbsii). While today restricted to the New World, fossils are known from Eurasia.

== Literature cited ==
- Hutterer, R. 2005. Order Soricomorpha. Pp. 220–311 in Wilson, D.E. and Reeder, D.M. (eds.). Mammal Species of the World: a taxonomic and geographic reference. 3rd ed. Baltimore: The Johns Hopkins University Press, 2 vols., 2142 pp. ISBN 978-0-8018-8221-0
