= Dipus nanus =

Dipus nanus Temporal range: Neogene

Scientific classification
- Domain: Eukaryota
- Kingdom: Animalia
- Phylum: Chordata
- Class: Mammalia
- Order: Rodentia
- Family: Dipodidae
- Genus: Dipus
- Species: †D. nanus

Binomial name
- †Dipus nanus Qiu & Li, 2016

Extinct species of mammal

Dipus nanus is an extinct species of Dipus that inhabited China during the Neogene period.
