= Rzebikia =

Rzebikia Temporal range: Pliocene - Early Pleistocene

Scientific classification
- Domain: Eukaryota
- Kingdom: Animalia
- Phylum: Chordata
- Class: Mammalia
- Order: Eulipotyphla
- Family: Talpidae
- Tribe: Neurotrichini
- Genus: †Rzebikia; Kotsakis & Piras, 2016

Type species
- †Rzebikia polonicus Skoczeń, 1980

Species
- R. polonica; R. skoczeni

Extinct genus of mole

Rzebikia is an extinct genus of mole from the Plio-Pleistocene of Poland. It is closely related to the American shrew-mole (Neurotrichus gibbsii) and had formerly been placed in the same genus.

== Taxonomy ==
Two species are assigned to this genus, though both were originally described as belonging to the genus Neurotrichus. Rzebikia polonica and Rzebikia skoczeni. R. polonica was described in 1980 while R. skoczeni was described in 2004, originally under the name Neurotrichus minor, though it was found to be preoccupied by a subspecies of American shrew-mole. In 2014, the two species were moved out of Neurotrichus into their current genus.
