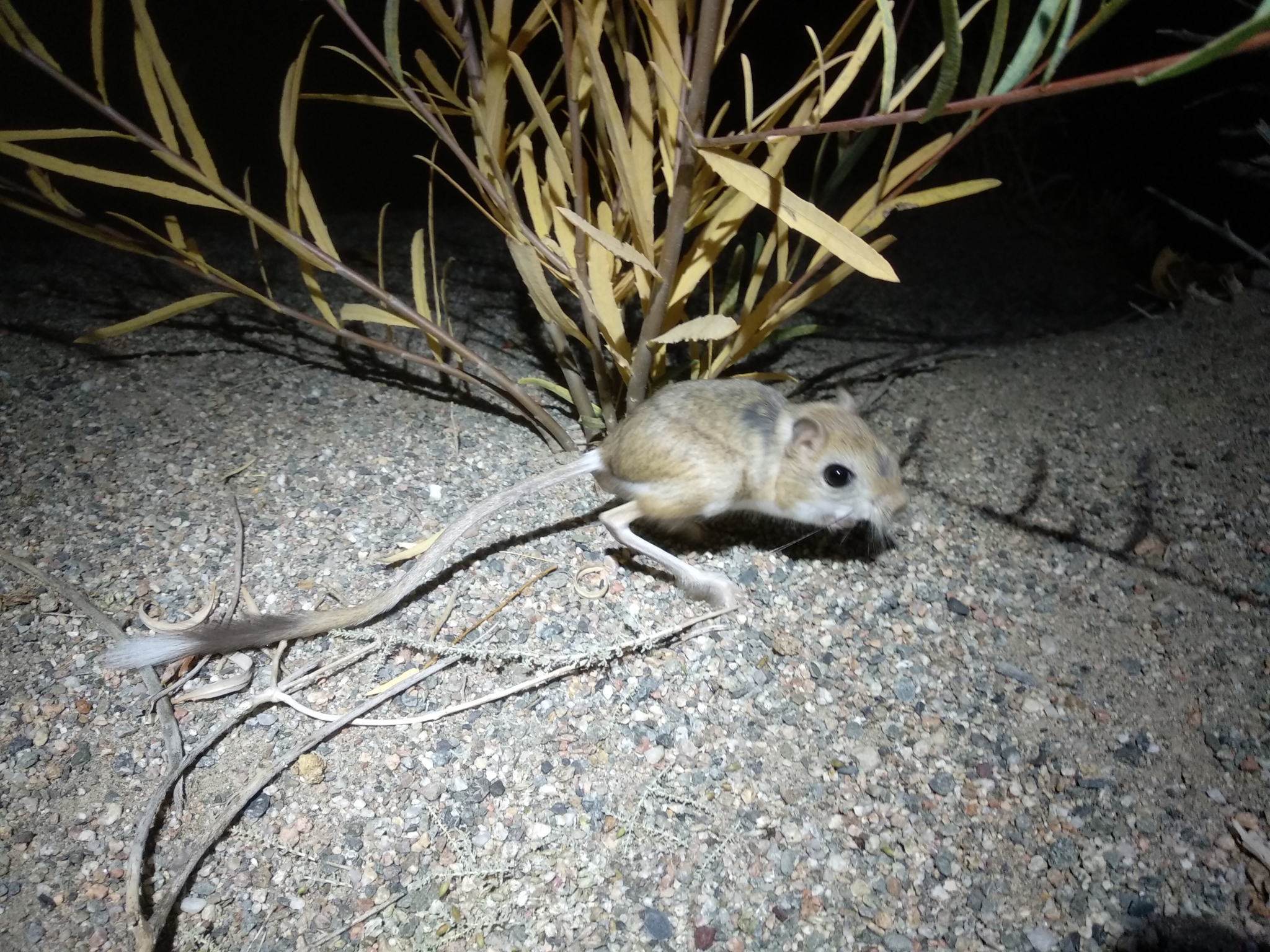

Conservation status
- Least Concern (IUCN 3.1)

Scientific classification
- Kingdom: Animalia
- Phylum: Chordata
- Class: Mammalia
- Order: Rodentia
- Family: Dipodidae
- Subfamily: Dipodinae
- Tribe: Dipodini
- Genus: Dipus
- Species: D. sagitta

Binomial name
- Dipus sagitta (Pallas, 1773)

= Northern three-toed jerboa =

Northern three-toed jerboa Temporal range: Pleistocene – Recent

Species of rodent

The northern three-toed jerboa (Dipus sagitta) is a species of rodent in the family Dipodidae. It is the only extant species within the genus Dipus. It ranges across Iran, Uzbekistan, Turkmenistan, Kazakhstan, Russia, China and Mongolia. A common species, the International Union for Conservation of Nature rates it as being of "least concern".

== Description ==
The northern three-toed jerboa has a head-and-body length of 100 to 155 mm (4 to 6 in) and a tail of 145 to 190 mm (5.7 to 7.5 in). The weight is between 56 and 117 g (2 and 4 oz). The upper parts are ochre-brown to reddish-brown, a white band stretches from the base of the tail across the hips, and the underparts are white. The hind feet have three toes, the central three metatarsal bones having fused to form a single structure. They have long white hairs on their upper surfaces and pads of stiff hairs under the toes. The long tail has a terminal tassel which is black with a white tip.

== Distribution and habitat ==
This jerboa has a range extending from the Don River and the Caspian Sea region, through Turkmenistan, Uzbekistan, Northern Iran and Kazakhstan, to Mongolia and Northern China. It lives in sandy deserts and semi-deserts, sandy pastures and pine forests on sandy ground. Although typically found between about 1,000 and 1,300 m (3,300 and 4,300 ft), it occurs as high as 3,000 m (10,000 ft) in the Altai Mountains.

== Ecology ==
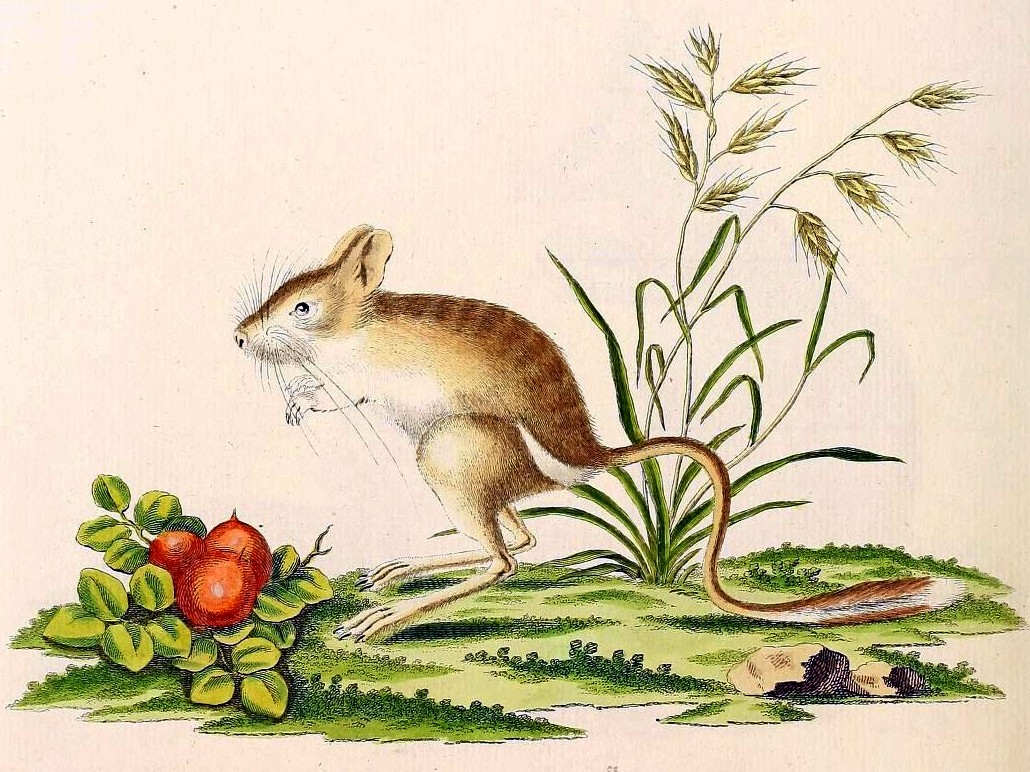
'Die Saugtiere in Abbildungen nach der Natur

The northern three-toed jerboa either lives alone or in pairs. It occupies an extensive home range in which there may be several burrows, several shallow temporary burrows and one main deep burrow. This has a steeply sloping main tunnel which then turns at an angle and ends in a nesting chamber, with several side chambers for the storage of food. The animal excavates the tunnel with its fore limbs, using its teeth to cut roots, and pushes soil out with its hind feet or nose, forming a characteristic fan-like mound of waste material. The burrow may be 2.5 m (8 ft) long and up to 1.5 m (5 ft) deep, and the animal can excavate passages at the rate of 40 cm (16 in) in ten minutes or so.

The species is nocturnal and emerges after dark to forage primarily for seeds, but also eats grasses, shoots, leaves, bulbs, roots and insects. It moves bipedally, normally making hops that are about 10 to 15 cm (4 to 6 in) long, but making great bounds of 120 to 140 cm (47 to 55 in) when agitated. Breeding takes place during the summer with two or three litters, each averaging three or four young, being produced after a gestation period of 25 to 30 days. In the north of its range, this jerboa hibernates during the winter deep underground, usually from about November to March.

In the man-made desert known as Aralkum that has been formed as a result of the shrinkage of the Aral Sea, the northern three-toed jerboa has made use of the new habitat where it lives alongside other small rodents including the Libyan jird, the midday jird and the great gerbil. These rodents are about four times more abundant on the dried-up seabed than in the surrounding terrain, and the presence of this abundance of rodent prey has attracted carnivores such as the red fox, the corsac fox, the steppe polecat, the marbled polecat and the Turkestan wildcat.

== Status ==
Dipus sagitta is a common species in suitable habitat across its wide range. It is presumed to have a large total population and is a pioneering species, often being the first small rodent to occupy new habitat, such as the drying seabed of the Aral Sea. No specific threats to this species have been identified, and the International Union for Conservation of Nature has assessed its conservation status as being of "least concern".
