= Mubhammys =

Mubhammys Temporal range: Priabonian–Rupelian

Scientific classification
- Kingdom: Animalia
- Phylum: Chordata
- Class: Mammalia
- Order: Rodentia
- Parvorder: Phiomorpha
- Genus: †Mubhammys; Sallam and Seiffert, 2016

Species
- Mubhammys vadumensis Sallam and Seiffert, 2016; Mubhammys atlanticus Marivaux et al., 2017

Extinct genus of phiomorph rodent

Mubhammys is an extinct genus of phiomorph rodent that lived in North Africa during the Priabonian and Rupelian stages of the Eocene and Oligocene epochs.

== Description ==
Unlike Mubhammys vadumensis, Mubhammys atlanticus has a mesolophule that is thin, well-defined, and oblique; the latter species also has a better-defined anterostyle and lingual anterocingulum than the former species.
