= Tamiops minor =

Tamiops minor Temporal range: Neogene

Scientific classification
- Domain: Eukaryota
- Kingdom: Animalia
- Phylum: Chordata
- Class: Mammalia
- Order: Rodentia
- Family: Sciuridae
- Genus: Tamiops
- Species: †T. minor

Binomial name
- †Tamiops minor Qiu & Li, 2016

Extinct species of squirrel

Tamiops minor is an extinct species of squirrel in the genus Tamiops that lived during the Neogene period.

== Distribution ==
Tamiops minor is known from fossils unearthed in Inner Mongolia, China.
