= Whollydooleya =

Scientific classification
- Domain: Eukaryota
- Kingdom: Animalia
- Phylum: Chordata
- Class: Mammalia
- Infraclass: Marsupialia
- Order: Dasyuromorphia
- Family: Dasyuridae
- Genus: †Whollydooleya
- Species: †W. tomnpatrichorum

Binomial name
- †Whollydooleya tomnpatrichorum Archer et al, 2016

Extinct genus of marsupials

Whollydooleya tomnpatrichorum is a fossil species discovered just beyond the Riversleigh World Heritage Area, an early example of adaptations to hypercarnivory. The dating of the deposit, while uncertain, is associated with material assigned to the genus Ekaltadeta, placing its occurrence in the middle or late Miocene epoch.

== Taxonomy ==
The description of a new species and genus was published in 2016, a collaboration between researchers at several Australian institutions. The authors placed the new genus with the Dasyuridae family, and tentatively proposed an alliance to species of Daysurinae. The holotype and only described material is a single tooth, the second or third molar, found close to the edge of the Riversleigh fossil area at a region referred to as the "new Riversleigh". The site of discovery and the genus are named for a location known as Wholly Dooley hill, which itself was named for a volunteer working at Riversleigh, Genevieve Dooley. The specific epithet tomnpatrichorum combines the names of the researchers Tom and Pat Rich, who are commemorated for their work at Riversleigh and contributions to Australian palaeontology.

== Description ==
A hypercarnivorous marsupial distantly related to Sarcophilus harrisii, the Tasmanian devil. a marsupial carnivore which occurs in Tasmania. The mass of the animal is estimated to have between 20 and 25 kilograms, around twice the weight of S. harrisii, and able to consume animals greater in size than itself.

The new species is the first described from the Wholly Dooley site, which was discovered by examining satellite data and revealed an assemblage of unknown taxa deposited during a period of aridification in the Riversleigh area.
