= Fragilicetus =

Fragilicetus Temporal range: Early Pliocene

Scientific classification
- Domain: Eukaryota
- Kingdom: Animalia
- Phylum: Chordata
- Class: Mammalia
- Order: Artiodactyla
- Infraorder: Cetacea
- Family: Balaenopteridae
- Genus: †Fragilicetus; Bisconti and Bosselaers, 2016
- Species: †F. velponi

Binomial name
- †Fragilicetus velponi Bisconti and Bosselaers, 2016

Extinct genus of whales

Fragilicetus is an extinct genus of rorqual from Early Pliocene deposits in Belgium.

== Description ==
Fragilicetus exhibits a combination of balaenopterid features (shape of the supraorbital process of the frontal and significant details of the temporal fossa) and those found in Cetotheriidae and Eschrichtiidae (squamosal bulge and posteriorly protruded exoccipital).
