= Quadratodon =

Quadratodon Temporal range: Palaeocene

Scientific classification
- Domain: Eukaryota
- Kingdom: Animalia
- Phylum: Chordata
- Class: Mammalia
- Order: Eulipotyphla (?)
- Genus: †Quadratodon; De Bast and Smith, 2016

Quadratodon is an extinct genus of eutherian that inhabited Belgium during the Palaeocene epoch. It is known from a single species, Q. sigei. It has been tentatively assigned to the order Eulipotyphla.
