= Sanshuilophus =

Sanshuilophus Temporal range: Early Eocene

Scientific classification
- Kingdom: Animalia
- Phylum: Chordata
- Class: Mammalia
- Infraclass: Placentalia
- Family: †Phenacolophidae
- Genus: †Sanshuilophus
- Species: †S. zhaoi

Binomial name
- †Sanshuilophus zhaoi Mao et al., 2016

Extinct genus of phenacolophid altungulate

Sanshuilophus is an extinct monotypic genus of phenacolophid mammal that lived in East Asia during the Ypresian stage of the Eocene epoch.

== Description ==
The enamel microstructure pattern of the type species, Sanshuilophus zhaoi, was typical of a phenacolophid, with the inner Schmelzmuster containing prisms bounded into Hunter-Schreger bands (HSBs) while the outer layer consisted of prisms that were orientated either perpendicular or parallel to the enamel-dentine junction (EDJ). The species had bilophodont molars characterised by an absent mesostyle. Its premolars were sub-molariform in their morphology. Its body size was large compared to other phenacolophids, with the exception of the genus Zaisanolophus.
