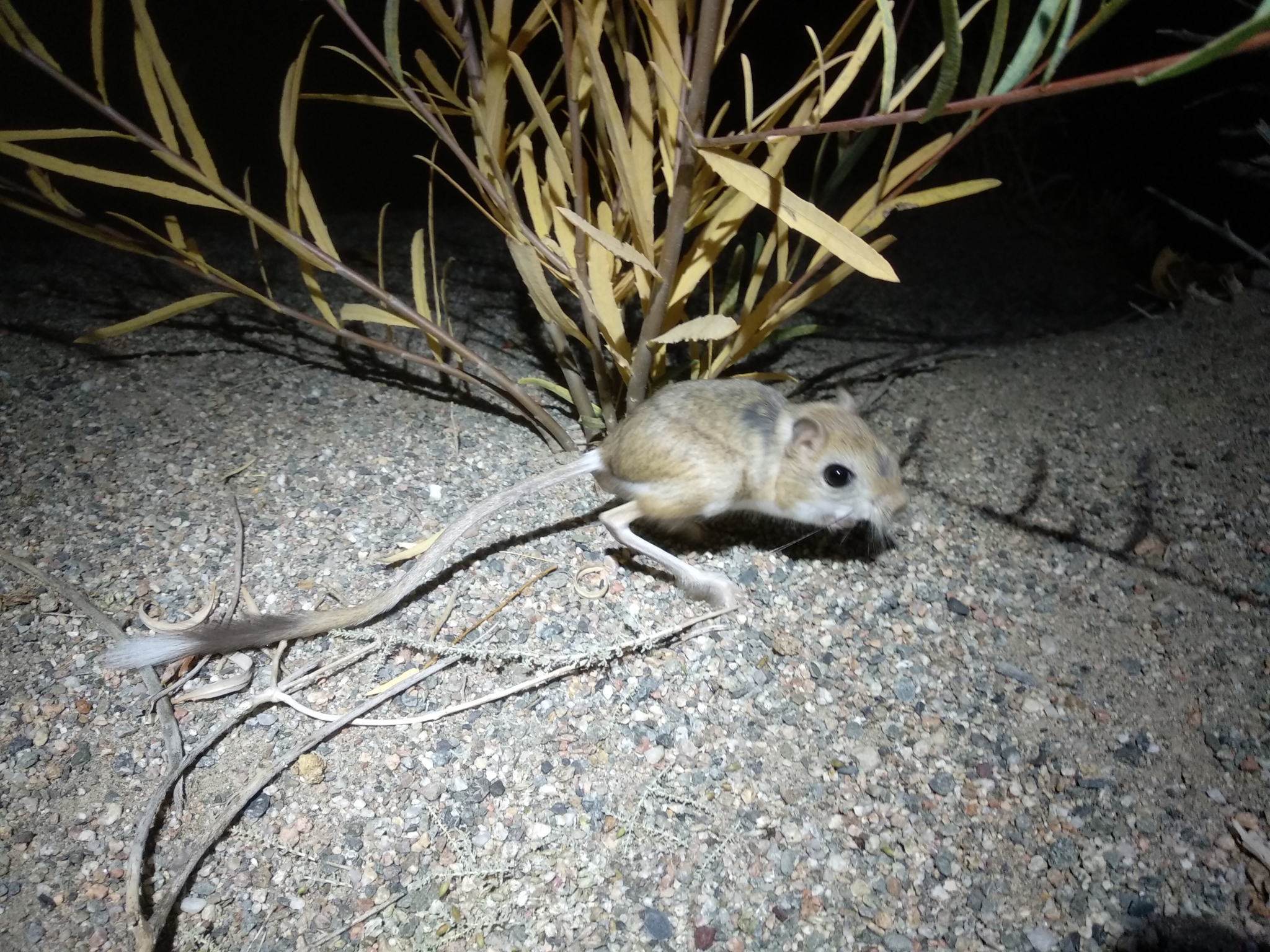
- Northern three-toed jerboa (Dipus sagitta)

Scientific classification
- Domain: Eukaryota
- Kingdom: Animalia
- Phylum: Chordata
- Class: Mammalia
- Order: Rodentia
- Family: Dipodidae
- Tribe: Dipodini
- Genus: Dipus; Zimmermann, 1780

Type species
- Mus sagitta Pallas, 1773

Species
- Dipus sagitta; Dipus deasyi; †Dipus conditor; †Dipus essedum; †Dipus fraudator; †Dipus singularis

= Dipus =

Dipus Temporal range: Miocene - Recent

Genus of rodent

Dipus, meaning "two foot" in Ancient Greek, is a genus of jerboa. Today only a single species is usually recognized, the northern three-toed jerboa (Dipus sagitta), widespread throughout Central Asia. Some authors recognize a second species, the Qaidam three-toed jerboa (Dipus deasyi) from the Qaidam Basin of western China. The genus has a fossil record that dates back to the Miocene, with several extinct species known from Asia. The oldest dated species is Dipus conditor.
