= Cingulodon =

Cingulodon Temporal range: Early Palaeocene

Scientific classification
- Kingdom: Animalia
- Phylum: Chordata
- Class: Mammalia
- Genus: †Cingulodon
- Species: †C. magioncaldai

Binomial name
- †Cingulodon magioncaldai De Bast and Smith, 2017

Extinct genus of eutherian

Cingulodon is an extinct genus of eutherian mammal that lived in Belgium during the Danian stage of Palaeocene epoch.

== Taxonomy ==
The phylogenetic placement of Cingulodon magioncaldai is uncertain, although it may represent a member of Louisinidae.
