= Birkamys =

Birkamys Temporal range: Priabonian

Scientific classification
- Kingdom: Animalia
- Phylum: Chordata
- Class: Mammalia
- Infraclass: Placentalia
- Order: Rodentia
- Suborder: Hystricomorpha
- Infraorder: Hystricognathi
- Parvorder: Phiomorpha
- Genus: †Birkamys; Sallam & Seiffert, 2016
- Species: †B. korai

Binomial name
- †Birkamys korai Sallam & Seiffert, 2016

Extinct genus of phiomorph rodent

Birkamys is an extinct monotypic genus of phiomorph rodent that lived in North Africa during the Priabonian stage of the Eocene epoch.

== Etymology ==
The generic name Birkamys is composed of the roots birka, meaning swamp in Arabic, and mys, meaning mouse in Greek. The specific epithet of the type species, Birkamys korai, honours the palaeontologist Mahmoud Kora of Mansoura University for his contributions to stratigraphic research in Egypt.
