= Semnopithecus gwebinensis =

Semnopithecus gwebinensis Temporal range: Late Pliocene

Scientific classification
- Kingdom: Animalia
- Phylum: Chordata
- Class: Mammalia
- Infraclass: Placentalia
- Order: Primates
- Family: Cercopithecidae
- Genus: Semnopithecus
- Species: †S. gwebinensis

Binomial name
- †Semnopithecus gwebinensis Takai et al., 2016

Extinct species of monkey

Semnopithecus gwebinensis is an extinct species of Semnopithecus that lived during the Piacenzian stage of the Neogene period.

== Distribution ==
Semnopithecus gwebinensis is known from Myanmar.
