= Synemporion =

Synemporion Temporal range: Pleistocene–Holocene

Scientific classification
- Kingdom: Animalia
- Phylum: Chordata
- Class: Mammalia
- Order: Chiroptera
- Family: Vespertilionidae
- Genus: †Synemporion; Ziegler et al., 2016
- Species: †S. keana

Binomial name
- †Synemporion keana Ziegler et al., 2016

Extinct species of bat

Synemporion keana is an extinct species of bat which lived in what is now Hawaii from at least 320,000 years ago to around 2,100 years ago. It is the only species in the genus Synemporion.

== Fossil discovery ==
The first fossils of Synemporion keana were found in a lava tube on Maui in 1981. As of 2016, fossils from at least 110 unique individuals of this species have been uncovered.

== Taxonomy and etymology ==
The genus name Synemporion is derived from Ancient Greek "synemporos" meaning "fellow traveler or companion." The authors chose this genus name to reflect the fact that the genus traveled on the tectonically active Hawaiian Islands along with the Hawaiian hoary bat (Aeorestes semotus). The species name "keana" comes from Hawaiian "ke" meaning "the" and "ana" meaning "cave." The name keana references the fact that the holotype was discovered in a lava tube.

The relationship of Synemporion relative to other vesper bat genera is inconclusive. Researchers have been unable to extract its DNA from fossils, which is the only reliable way to examine phylogenetic relationships in this family of bats. It is unclear if Synemporion colonized the Hawaiian Islands from the Old World or the New World; most likely it belonged to one of the tribes of subfamily Vespertilioninae which make up the bulk of vesper bats but this is simply assumed because the minor subfamilies of vesper bats as well as the Vespertilioninae tribes were all well distinct from each other already by the time Synemporion became a separate lineage. But few skeletal characteristics are known to reliably indicate relationships among the vesper bats, so all that can be said at present is that it lacks obvious traits suggesting it belongs to one of the minor vesper bat subfamilies.

== Description ==
It was a relatively small species of bat, with linear measurements about 25% smaller than the Hawaiian hoary bat which weighs 10-15 grams and has a wingspan of around a dozen cm. Notably, the skull's muzzle is somewhat more narrow than in its fellow species, and the nasal region is markedly concave (instead of barely convex in A. semotus), resulting in the skull having a pronounced snout. How its nose looked in life is unknown; the Vespertilionidae generally produce echolocation sounds with the voicebox and not with the nose, and consequently lack the elaborate ultrasound-focusing nose appendages of bats that use the latter technique. To what extent this applied to Synemporion is not clear; most of the tribes it may belong to contain a few species with nose or upper jaw appendages. These are rarely as elaborate as those of horseshoe bats (Rhinolophidae), for example, and are sometimes related to sexual selection rather than echolocation; there is no indication that Synemporion had marked sexual differences, and altogether its skull shape is not too different from that of Australasian big-eared bats (Nyctophilus).

One notable difference from all vesper bats it was compared with, however, is the sagittal crest which seems to be completely absent in Synemporion. The teeth are more delicate than in the Hawaiian hoary bat, especially so in the lower jaw; otherwise their dentitions differ little. Its dental formula was 1.1.1.33.1.2.3 or 1.1.2.33.1.2.3 for a total of 30 or 32 teeth. The missing sagittal crest combined with the weaker dentition makes it almost certain that Synemporion could not nearly bite as hard as A. semotus, and thus ate different, smaller and/or more soft-bodied prey.

== Geographic range ==
S. keana lived on at least 5 Hawaiian islands: Kauaʻi, Oʻahu, Molokaʻi, Maui, and Hawaiʻi.

== Temporal range ==
While it is unknown when Synemporion first arrived in the Hawaiian islands, the oldest known fossils are from 320,000–400,000-year-old deposits on Oahu. One bone from another site on Oahu has been dated at 2718–2479 years ago, but some undated remains indicate that S. keana survived until more recently; relatively well-preserved skeletons in a wet, dynamically active cave on Molokai suggest that the bat may have survived until as recently as a few thousand years ago.

== Extinction ==
Like many Hawaiian fauna, the extinction of Synemporion keana may have been caused by humans, either directly or indirectly. Possible causes of its extinction include destruction of Hawaiian lowland dry forests and introduction of predators such as rats.

== See also ==
- List of extinct animals of the Hawaiian Islands
