= Khoufechia =

Khoufechia Temporal range: Lutetian

Scientific classification
- Kingdom: Animalia
- Phylum: Chordata
- Class: Mammalia
- Order: Chiroptera
- Family: Nycteridae
- Genus: †Khoufechia
- Species: †K. gunnelli

Binomial name
- †Khoufechia gunnelli Ravel et al., 2016

Extinct genus of nycterid bat

Khoufechia is an extinct monotypic genus of nycterid bat that lived in what is now North Africa during the Lutetian stage of the Eocene epoch.

== Etymology ==
The generic name Khoufechia is derived from Khouféche, the Arabic word for a bat. The specific epithet of the type species, Khoufechia gunnelli, honours the palaeontologist Gregg Gunnell.

== Description ==
K. gunnelli lacked a carnassiform notch, contrasting with all extant nycterids that have a deep carnassiform notch on the cristid obliqua of mandibular molars but not on the postcristid.
