= Magwetherium =

Magwetherium Temporal range: Bartonian

Scientific classification
- Kingdom: Animalia
- Phylum: Chordata
- Class: Mammalia
- Infraclass: Placentalia
- Order: Artiodactyla
- Family: †Diacodexeidae
- Genus: †Magwetherium
- Species: †M. burmense

Binomial name
- †Magwetherium burmense Ducrocq et al., 2016

Extinct genus of diacodexeid artiodactyl

Magwetherium is an extinct monotypic genus of diacodexeid mammal that lived in Southeast Asia during the Bartonian stage of the Eocene epoch.

== Etymology ==
The generic name Magwetherium references the Magwe division, where the fossils of the Pondaung Formation hail from, and the Ancient Greek word therion, meaning mammal. The specific epithet of the type species, Magwetherium burmense, references the country of Burma, where the holotype was discovered.
