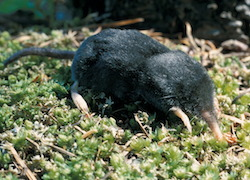

Conservation status
- Least Concern (IUCN 3.1)

Scientific classification
- Kingdom: Animalia
- Phylum: Chordata
- Class: Mammalia
- Order: Eulipotyphla
- Family: Talpidae
- Genus: Neurotrichus
- Species: N. gibbsii

Binomial name
- Neurotrichus gibbsii (Baird, 1858)
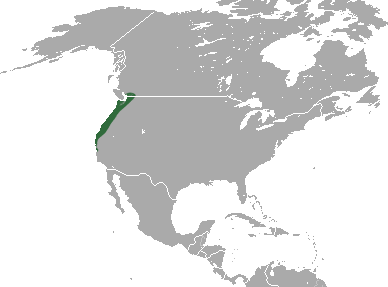
- American shrew mole range

= American shrew mole =

Species of mammal

The American shrew mole (Neurotrichus gibbsii) is the smallest species of mole. It is the only living member of the genus Neurotrichus and the tribe Neurotrichini. It is also known as Gibb's shrew mole and least shrew mole. It is not closely related to the Asian shrew mole (Uropsilus in Urotrichini). Its shrew-like fur and typical mole head make the common name "shrew mole" fitting.

== Habitat ==
It is found in damp, forested or bushy areas with deep, loose soils in the northwestern United States and southwestern British Columbia. In the most northern part of its habitat, it lives along streams or moist dense woods and in the most southern part of its habitat, it is found in swampy areas that are overgrown with vegetation such as sedges or shrubs.

== Morphological features ==
Like shrews, it has a pelage with guard hairs and underfur. Its fur is dense and soft. The color ranges from dark gray to a sooty bluish-black. Its tail is about half the length of its head and body. Its tail is also covered with scales and scattered coarse hairs. It has a long, flattened snout, and a short but thick, bristled tail. It is the smallest of the American moles. It is about 10 cm (3.9 in) in length including a 3 centimetres (1.2 in) tail, and weighs about 10 g (0.35 oz). It has a zygoma and auditory bullae, which are absent in shrews, but present in moles. The enamel that covers its teeth is white instead of mahogany or reddish-brown, like it is in shrews. It also lacks a penis bone. Its front paws are smaller and do not face outwards from the body as in more fossorial moles, and so are more similar to those of shrews. The front paws are also broad with bifurcate phalanges, which provide more support for the claws in order to dig. Also, the three middle claws of the front paws are elongated and the eyes are also completely covered by skin.

In addition to the front paws, the rest of its morphological features allow it to be highly fossorial and subterranean. It has a streamlined body that allow it to move smoothly through tunnels and short appendages that are kept close to the body. It also has no ear pinnae, which is the external part of the ear. These features reduce drag when it digs and when it moves through tunnels.

== Digging and burrowing ==
The shrew-mole is often confused with pocket gophers, another group of fossorial subterranean mammals, because they have similar habits but they differ greatly in the methods for burrowing. Most fossorial mammals, including the pocket gophers dig with their forepaws held directly below their body, but shrew-moles dig using lateral-strokes. This method of lateral-stroke burrowing in shrew moles is an evolutionary adaptation due to the modification of the pectoral girdle and bones of the forelimbs. The pelvic girdle is small and unmodified, but the pectoral girdle contains a special joint that causes the clavicle to join with the humerus instead of the scapula. The humerus bones are unique to shrew-moles because they exist as massive rectangular shapes, unlike other fossorial mammalian groups. The humerus also has a large surface area for the attachment of well developed muscles used for digging.

The shrew-mole makes permanent tunnels by digging with its forelimbs and using its forefeet to soften the soil that will be removed to make a hollow tunnel. The tunnels form complex networks that interconnect and lead to burrows. The tunnels are rarely ever deeper than 30 centimeters below the surface, so they are not as deep as the tunnels of other mole species. The burrows are made beneath decaying leaf litter and have an opening on the ceiling that leads to the surface, which serves the purpose of ventilation. The shrew-mole also makes shallow surface runways by moving the front part of its body 45 degrees to the right and then to the left. Then back again to the right, then left, and so on. When it moves to the right, the left forepaw is thrust up rapidly lifting soil in the process and when it moves to the left, the right forepaw is thrust up to lift soil.

As the shrew-mole continues to dig through the soil, the amount of prey in the soil is significantly less than the amount present in soil that has not been dug through by them. In addition, it spends a lot of its energy to dig through the soil. Due to these factors, it is common for shrew-moles to forage through tunnels that have been dug by other shrew-moles because it is more energetically efficient and more prey might be present in tunnels that have been abandoned.

== Skull and dentition ==
It has a long and narrow rostrum, which is the projection that forms the snout. The junction between the skull bones turns into bone early on in their age, which makes it difficult to identify their age based on looking at their skull bones. The maxillary only turns into bone in the adults and the roots of the upper molars are exposed in immature shrew-moles. The first upper incisor is flat and it does not have an elongated crown, like shrews do. It has 36 teeth, which consist of incisors, canines, pre-molars, and molars.

== Diet and digestion ==
This mole is often active above ground, foraging in leaf litter for earthworms, insects, snails and slugs. It is also known to eat some vegetation such as mycorrhizal fungi and even salamanders, but earthworms are the most important food item in its diet. Its diet also depends on the type of available food sources, so it may eat more vegetation than anything else if there are no insects or other arthropods within its vicinity. It is able to climb bushes to forage for food, although that is not its main eating resource.

Like all shrew-moles, the stomach size of this shrew mole in inversely proportional to its body weight. Their intestinal tract is quite short and digestion occurs rapidly.

== Predators ==
Predators include owls, hawks and mustelids such as weasels, fishers, and pine martens. Additional predators include red and gray foxes, raccoons, and skunks. Dogs and cats can kill them as well, but do not eat them. Venomous and non-venomous snakes, bullfrogs, and opossums have also been reported to hunt them.

The most common ectoparasites found on these shrew moles are fleas and mites.

The endoparasites found in shrew-moles consist of twenty species of coccidian protozoans, at least five species of nematode, two species of trematode, and two species of acanthocephalan.

== Physiology ==
When underground shrew-moles can suffer from a low levels of oxygen, high levels of carbon dioxide, and high levels of humidity. In order to cope with these conditions, shrew-moles contain lungs that can hold large volumes and sometimes even more than 20% of their body weight.

They also experience stages of sleep that are similar to humans such as rapid eye movement sleep. It is believed that the reason why they experience stages of deep sleep is because they are subject to less danger than other mammals.

They have well-developed hearing.

== Genetics ==
The shrew-mole has 38 chromosomes. The sex chromosomes are XX in females and XY in males. The Y chromosome in males is very small and appears to be similar in all species.

== Reproduction ==
It can have several litters annually, though no litters have been recorded between December and January. Females have litters with one to four young. Newborns are about 30 millimeters long and weigh less than 1 gram.

In females, the vagina remains sealed until follicles appear in the ovaries. Males lack a scrotum, but the testes and associated glands become enlarged, which increases their weight. These characteristics make it difficult to externally determine the sex of shrew-moles.

== Social behavior ==
It is somewhat gregarious, which means that it lives in loosely organized communities of about 12 to 15 shrew moles. The only known type of vocalization that they produce is a faint twittering sound that can be heard for several feet. It is both diurnal and nocturnal.

== Economic status ==
Shrew-moles usually live in areas where it is difficult to cultivate so they are usually economically neutral, but there are some cases where they do damage people's homes. There are many different methods that people use for getting rid of these moles. The most common non-commercial method is trapping because it is practical for homes with little land, but unpractical for large areas of land. Other methods include catching moles by spading where a spade is put behind the mole as it creates a surface tunnel or repairs a tunnel and is then lifted up or by hand, where the mole is picked up by its fur. Chemical control agents can also be used. Using bait is another method used to control these shrew-moles. The bait usually consists of some type of cereal grain that is treated with chemicals. The type of cereal grain and chemicals used depends on the manufacturer, but a common chemical is an anticoagulant that inhibits their normal platelet function in the blood, which causes internal hemorrhaging and leads to death. Some other approaches are to force the animal away somehow or to get rid of their food source.

There are also many home remedies that are used to get rid of these shrew-moles, but whether or not these methods are successful are usually not evident. These methods include using noisemaker devices such as placing empty soft drink bottles at an angle with the bottom in the tunnel while the neck is sticking. It is believed by some that the sound that the wind produces as it goes through the bottle scares the shrew-moles away. Materials consisting of offensive and unpleasant smells and materials that cause injury are also sometimes placed in the tunnels such as broken pieces of glass, razors, exhaust fumes, moth balls, gum, and thorns.
