= List of mammals of Ukraine =

There are eighty-five mammal species in Ukraine, of which two are critically endangered, two are endangered, thirteen are vulnerable, and three are near threatened. One of the species listed for Ukraine can no longer be found in the wild.

Icons which state each species' global IUCN status:
| CR | Critically Endangered | In imminent risk of extinction in the wild |
| EN | Endangered | Facing an extremely high risk of extinction in the wild |
| VU | Vulnerable | Facing a high risk of extinction in the wild |
| NT | Near Threatened | Doesn't meet any criteria that would categorise it as risking extinction but likely to in the future |
| LC | Least Concern | No current identifiable risks to this species |

== Order: Rodentia (rodents) ==
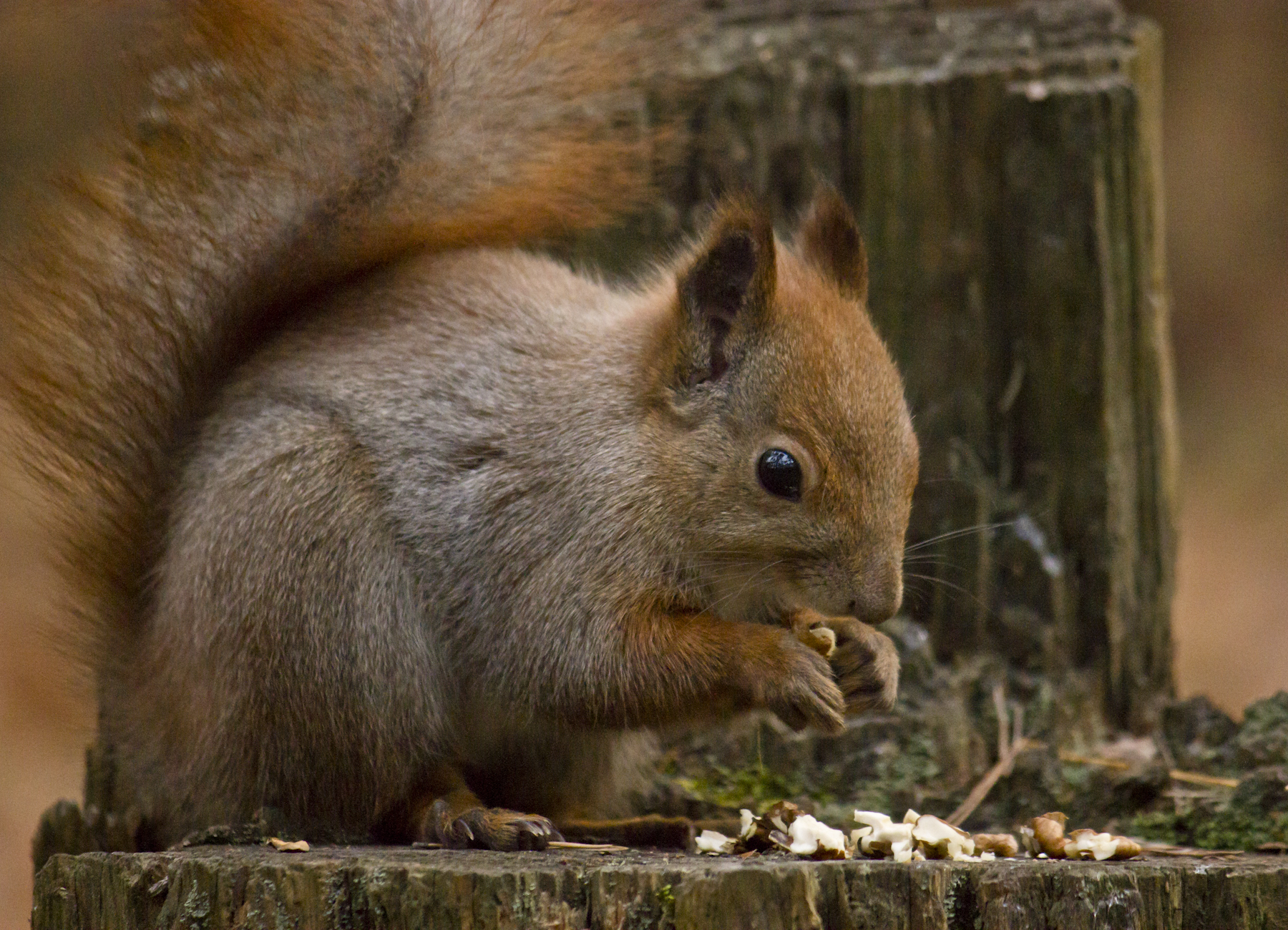
Red squirrel

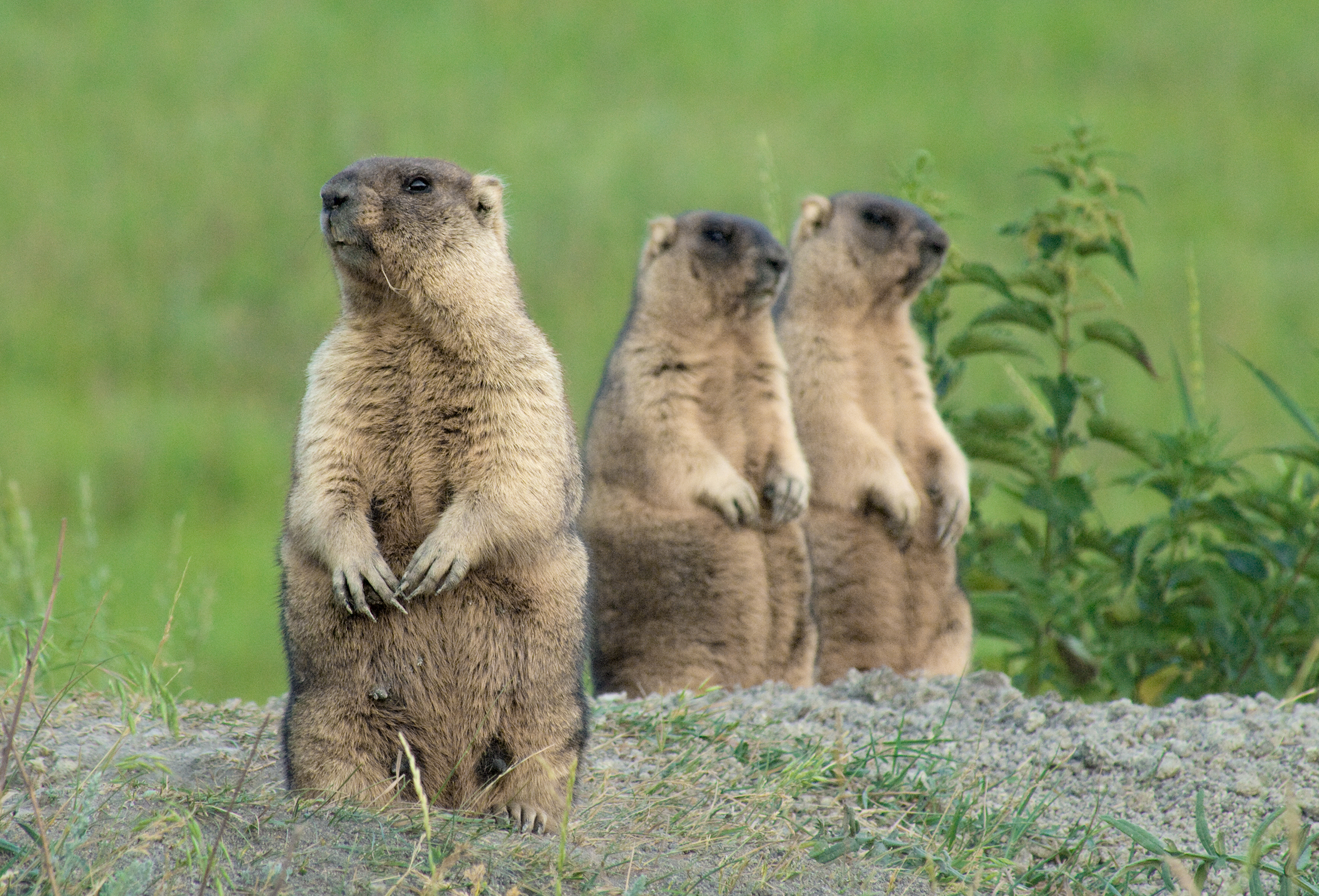
Bobak marmot

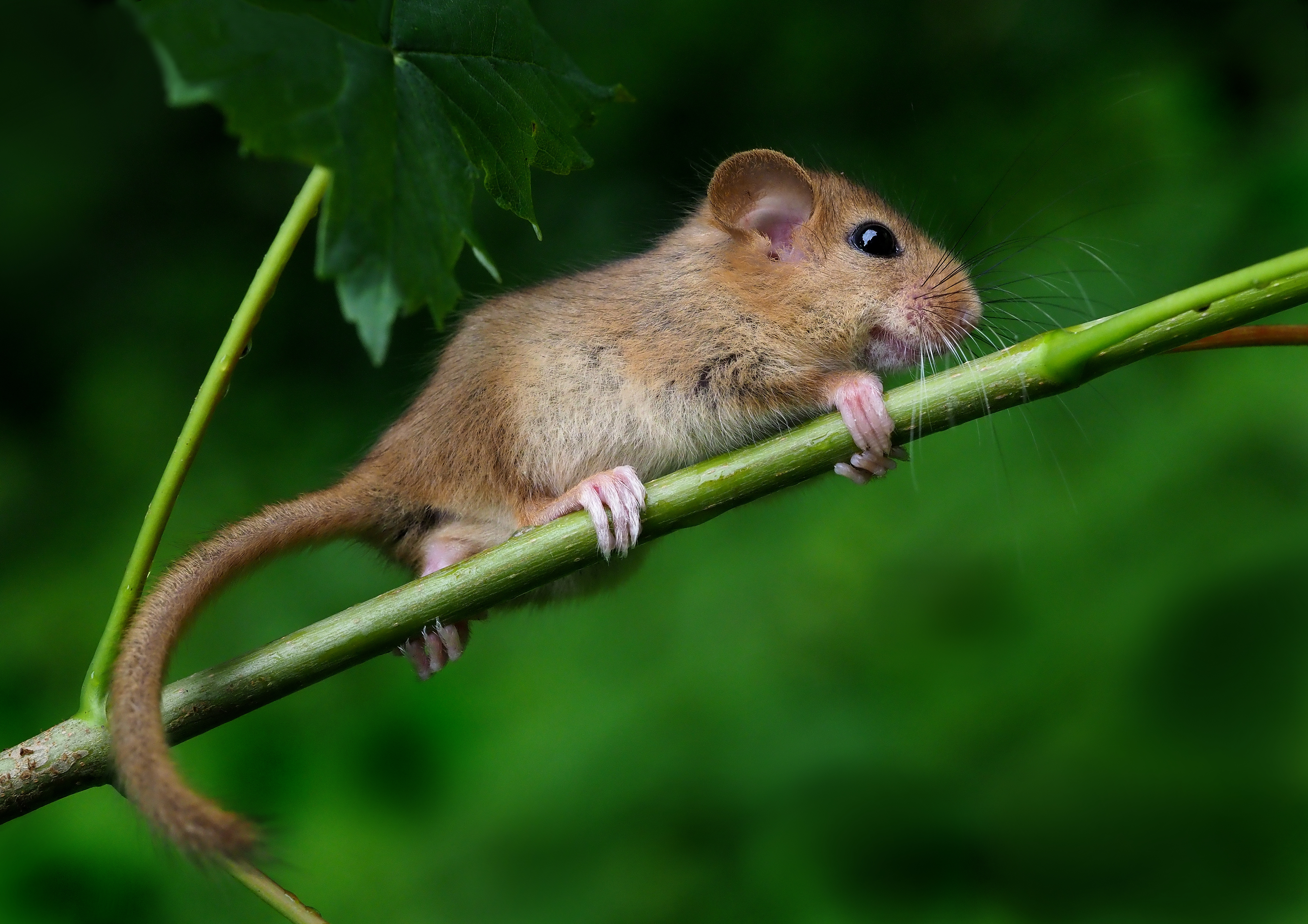
Hazel dormouse

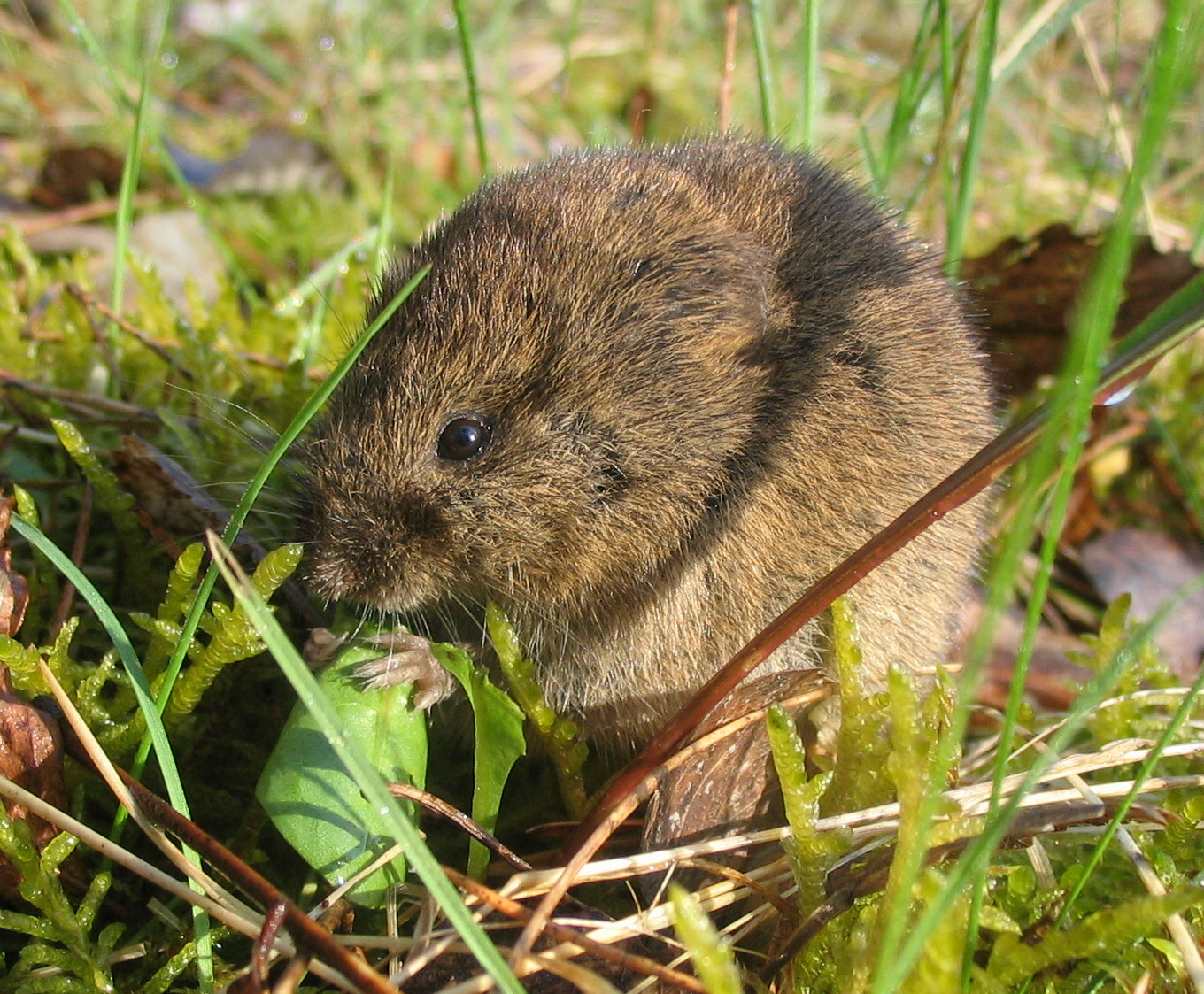
Common vole

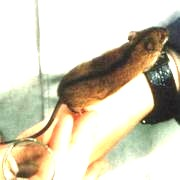
Striped field mouse

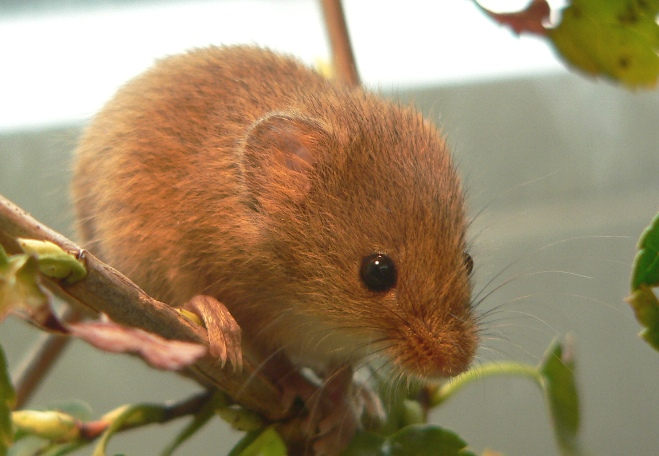
Eurasian harvest mouse

Rodents make up the largest order of mammals, with over 40% of mammalian species. They have two incisors in the upper and lower jaw which grow continually and must be kept short by gnawing.

- Suborder: Sciurognathi
  - Family: Sciuridae (squirrels)
    - Subfamily: Sciurinae
      - Tribe: Sciurini
        - Genus: Sciurus
          - Red squirrel, S. vulgaris LC
    - Subfamily: Xerinae
      - Tribe: Marmotini
        - Genus: Marmota
          - Bobak marmot, M. bobak LC
        - Genus: Spermophilus
          - European ground squirrel, Spermophilus citellus CR
          - Little ground squirrel, Spermophilus pygmaeus CR
          - Speckled ground squirrel, Spermophilus suslicus CR
  - Family: Castoridae (beavers)
    - Genus: Castor
      - Eurasian beaver, C. fiber LC
  - Family: Gliridae (dormice)
    - Subfamily: Leithiinae
      - Genus: Dryomys
        - Forest dormouse, Dryomys nitedula LC
      - Genus: Eliomys
        - Garden dormouse, E. quercinus NT
      - Genus: Muscardinus
        - Hazel dormouse, Muscardinus avellanarius LC
    - Subfamily: Glirinae
      - Genus: Glis
        - European edible dormouse, Glis glis LC
  - Family: Dipodidae (jerboas)
    - Subfamily: Dipodinae
      - Genus: Stylodipus
        - Thick-tailed three-toed jerboa, Stylodipus telum LC
    - Subfamily: Sicistinae
      - Genus: Sicista
        - Northern birch mouse, Sicista betulina LC
        - Southern birch mouse, Sicista subtilis LC
  - Family: Spalacidae
    - Subfamily: Spalacinae
      - Genus: Spalax
        - Sandy mole rat, Spalax arenarius VU
        - Bukovin mole rat, Spalax graecus VU
        - Greater mole rat, Spalax microphthalmus VU
        - Podolsk mole rat, Spalax zemni LC
      - Genus: Nannospalax
        - Lesser mole rat, Nannospalax leucodon VU
  - Family: Cricetidae
    - Subfamily: Cricetinae
      - Genus: Cricetulus
        - Grey dwarf hamster, Cricetulus migratorius LC
    - Subfamily: Arvicolinae
      - Genus: Arvicola
        - European water vole, A. amphibius LC
      - Genus: Chionomys
        - Snow vole, Chionomys nivalis LC
    - Genus: Clethrionomys
      - Bank vole, Clethrionomys glareolus LC
    - Genus: Ellobius
      - Northern mole vole, Ellobius talpinus LC
    - Genus: Lagurus
      - Steppe lemming, Lagurus lagurus LC
    - Genus: Microtus
      - Common vole, Microtus arvalis LC
      - Tundra vole, Microtus oeconomus LC
      - Southern vole, Microtus rossiaemeridionalis LC
      - Social vole, Microtus socialis LC
      - European pine vole, Microtus subterraneus LC
      - Tatra vole, Microtus tatricus LC
  - Family: Muridae (mice, rats, voles, gerbils, hamsters, etc.)
    - Subfamily: Murinae
      - Genus: Apodemus
        - Striped field mouse, Apodemus agrarius LC
        - Yellow-necked mouse, Apodemus flavicollis LC
        - Yellow-breasted field mouse, Apodemus fulvipectus LC
        - Wood mouse, Apodemus sylvaticus LC
        - Ural field mouse, Apodemus uralensis LC
      - Genus: Micromys
        - Harvest mouse, Micromys minutus LC
      - Genus: Mus
        - Steppe mouse, Mus spicilegus LC

== Order: Lagomorpha (lagomorphs) ==
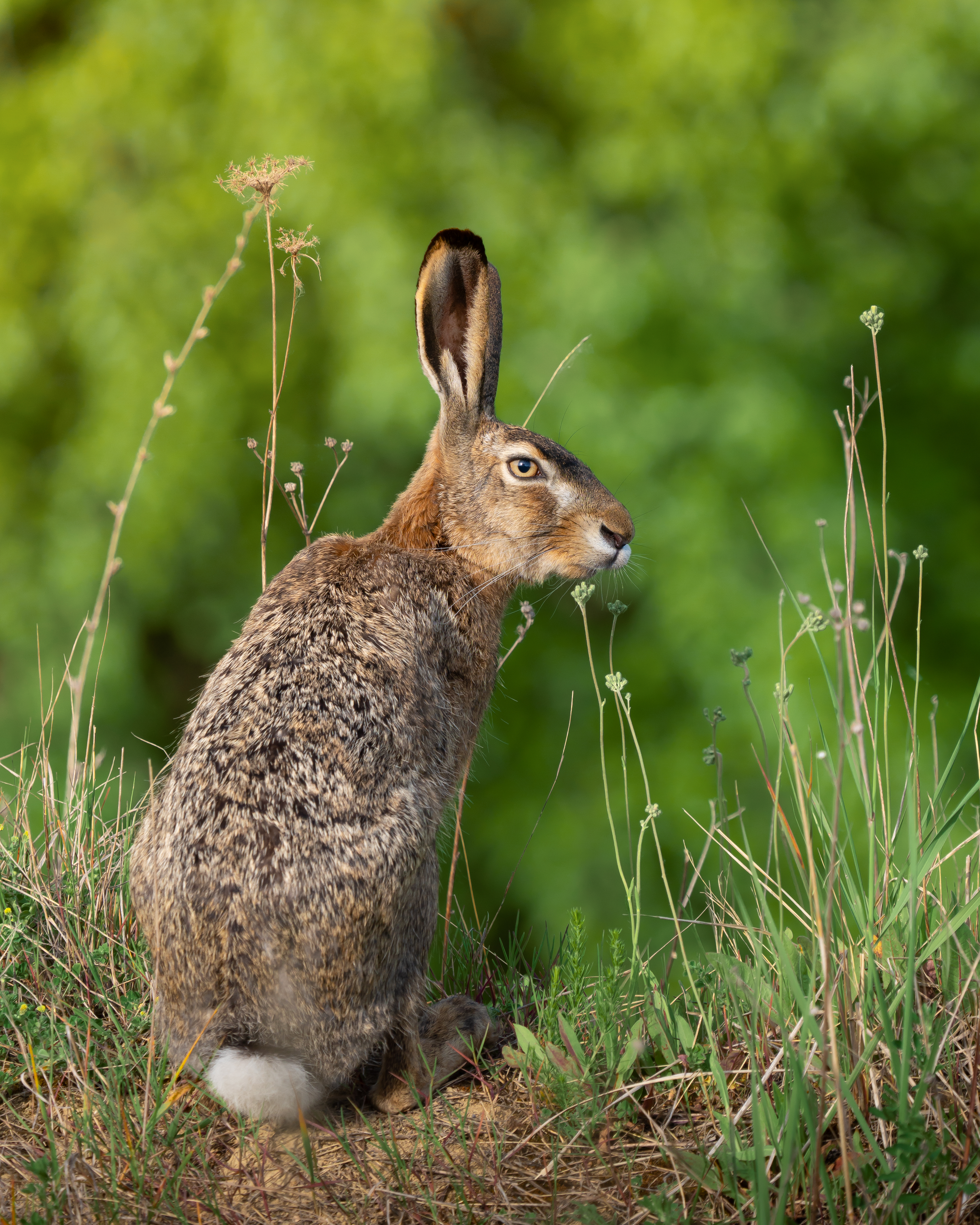
European hare

The lagomorphs comprise two families, Leporidae (hares and rabbits), and Ochotonidae (pikas). Though they can resemble rodents, and were classified as a superfamily in that order until the early 20th century, they have since been considered a separate order. They differ from rodents in a number of physical characteristics, such as having four incisors in the upper jaw rather than two.

- Family: Leporidae (rabbits, hares)
  - Genus: Oryctolagus
    - European rabbit, O. cuniculus EN
  - Genus: Lepus
    - European hare, L. europaeus LC
    - Mountain hare, L. timidus LC

== Order: Erinaceomorpha (hedgehogs and gymnures) ==
The order Erinaceomorpha contains a single family, Erinaceidae, which comprise the hedgehogs and gymnures. The hedgehogs are easily recognised by their spines while gymnures look more like large rats.

- Family: Erinaceidae (hedgehogs)
  - Subfamily: Erinaceinae
    - Genus: Erinaceus
      - Southern white-breasted hedgehog, E. concolor LC

== Order: Soricomorpha (shrews, moles, and solenodons) ==
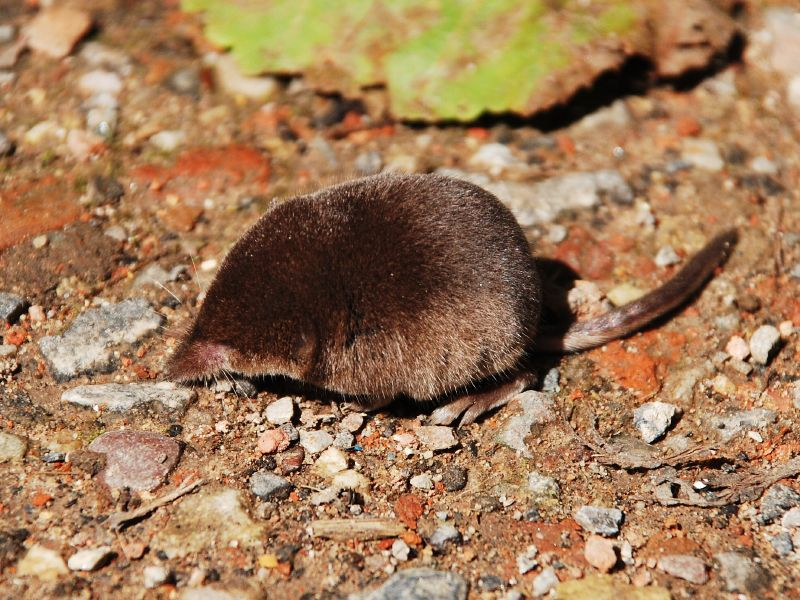
Eurasian pygmy shrew

The Soricomorpha are insectivorous mammals. The shrews and solenodons resemble mice while the moles are stout-bodied burrowers.

- Family: Soricidae (shrews)
  - Subfamily: Crocidurinae
    - Genus: Crocidura
      - Bicolored shrew, C. leucodon LC
      - Lesser white-toothed shrew, C. suaveolens LC
  - Subfamily: Soricinae
    - Tribe: Nectogalini
      - Genus: Neomys
        - Southern water shrew, N. anomalus LC
    - Tribe: Soricini
      - Genus: Sorex
        - Common shrew, S. araneus LC
        - Laxmann's shrew, S. caecutiens LC
        - Eurasian pygmy shrew, S. minutus LC
        - Caucasian pygmy shrew, S. volnuchini LC
- Family: Talpidae (moles)
  - Subfamily: Talpinae
    - Tribe: Desmanini
      - Genus: Desmana
        - Russian desman, D. moschata VU

== Order: Chiroptera (bats) ==
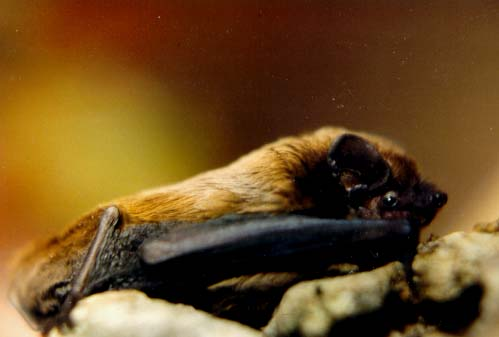
Lesser noctule

The bats' most distinguishing feature is that their forelimbs are developed as wings, making them the only mammals capable of flight. Bat species account for about 20% of all mammals.

- Family: Vespertilionidae
  - Subfamily: Myotinae
    - Genus: Myotis
      - Bechstein's bat, M. bechsteini NT
      - Pond bat, M. dasycneme NT
      - Geoffroy's bat, M. emarginatus LC
      - Greater mouse-eared bat, M. myotis LC
      - Natterer's bat, M. nattereri LC
  - Subfamily: Vespertilioninae
    - Genus: Barbastella
      - Western barbastelle, B. barbastellus NT
    - Genus: Hypsugo
      - Savi's pipistrelle, H. savii LC
    - Genus: Nyctalus
      - Greater noctule bat, N. lasiopterus NT
      - Lesser noctule, N. leisleri LC
    - Genus: Pipistrellus
      - Kuhl's pipistrelle, P. kuhlii LC
    - Genus: Plecotus
      - Brown long-eared bat, P. auritus LC
      - Grey long-eared bat, P. austriacus NT
- Family: Molossidae
  - Genus: Tadarida
    - European free-tailed bat, T. teniotis LC
- Family: Rhinolophidae
  - Subfamily: Rhinolophinae
    - Genus: Rhinolophus
      - Greater horseshoe bat, R. ferrumequinum LC
      - Lesser horseshoe bat, R. hipposideros LC

== Order: Cetacea (whales) ==
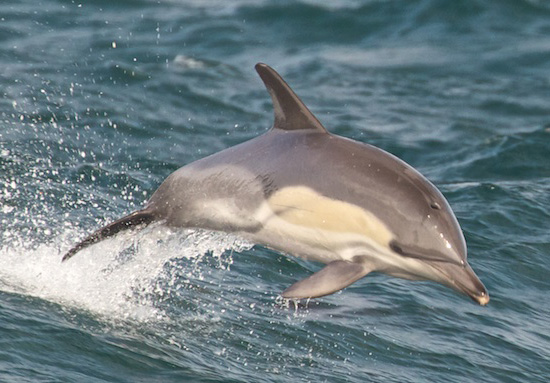
Short-beaked common dolphin

The order Cetacea includes whales, dolphins and porpoises. They are the mammals most fully adapted to aquatic life with a spindle-shaped nearly hairless body, protected by a thick layer of blubber, and forelimbs and tail modified to provide propulsion underwater.

- Suborder: Odontoceti
  - Superfamily: Platanistoidea
    - Family: Phocoenidae
      - Genus: Phocoena
        - Harbour porpoise, Phocoena phocoena VU
    - Family: Delphinidae (marine dolphins)
      - Genus: Tursiops
        - Bottlenose dolphin, Tursiops truncatus DD
      - Genus: Delphinus
        - Short-beaked common dolphin, Delphinus delphis LC

== Order: Carnivora (carnivorans) ==
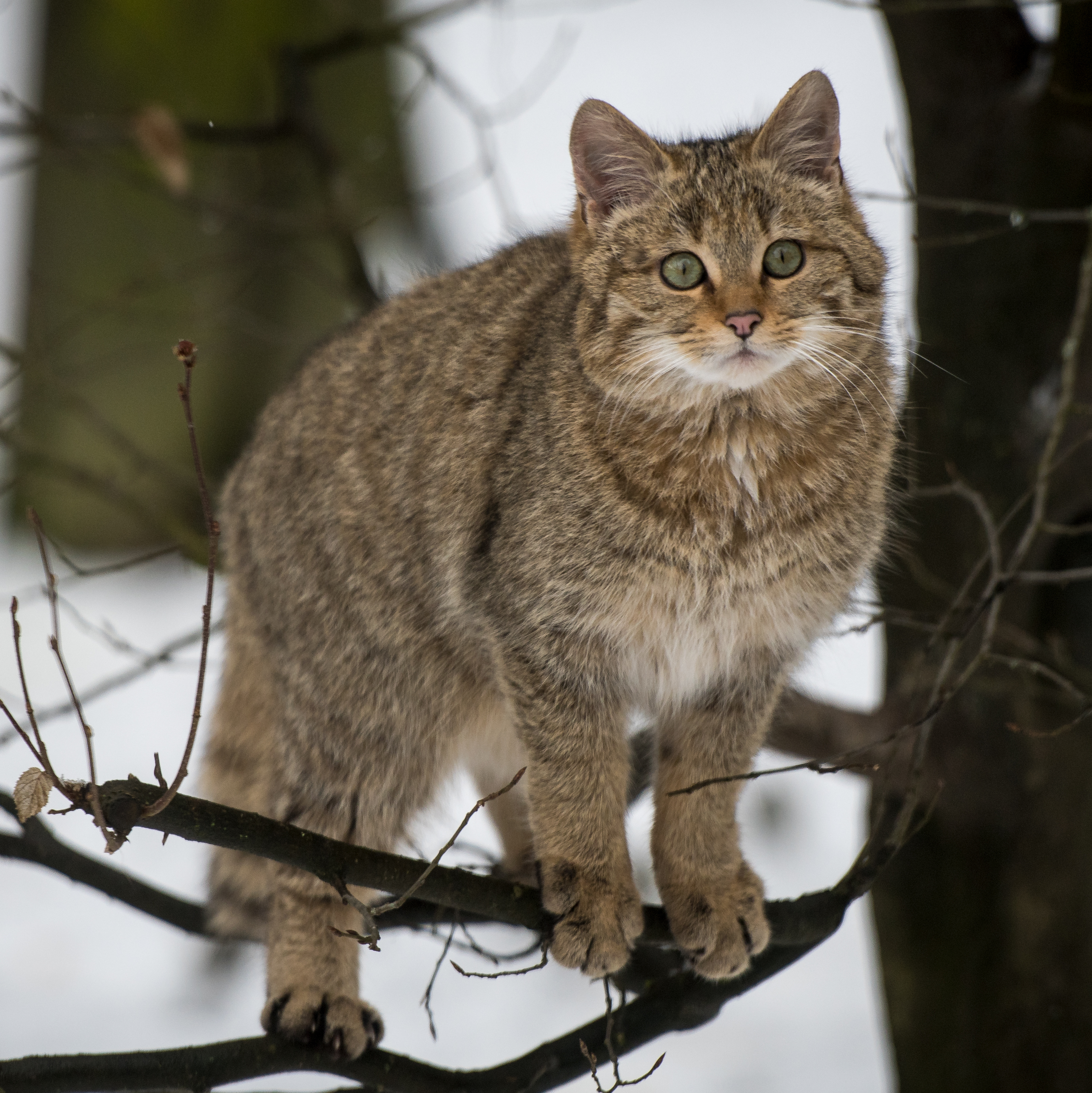
European wildcat

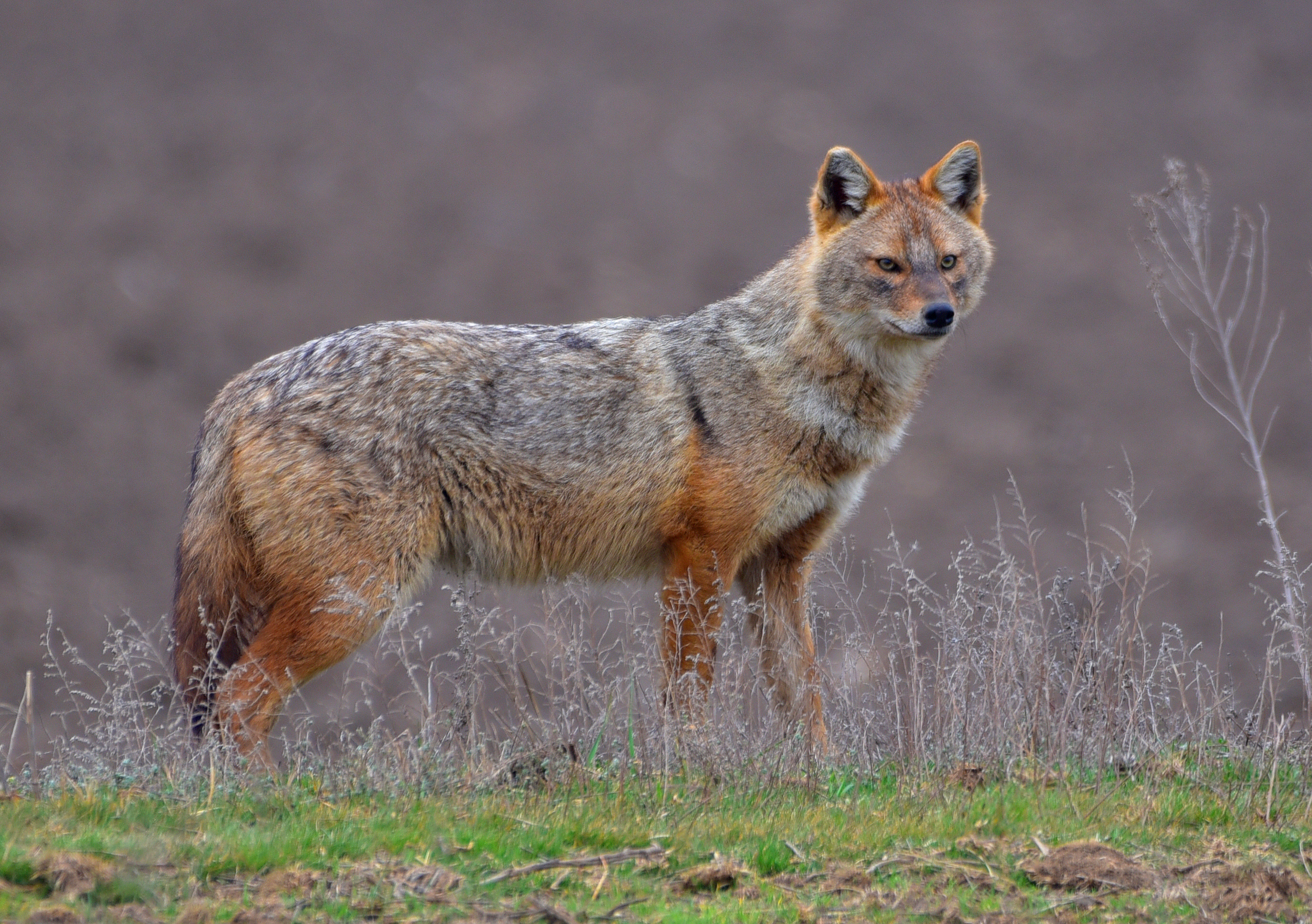
Golden jackal

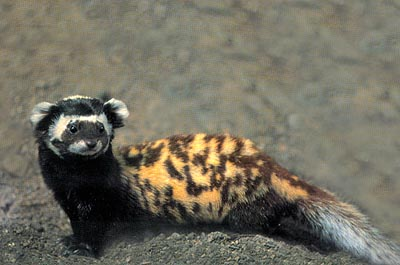
Marbled polecat

There are over 260 species of carnivorans, the majority of which feed primarily on meat. They have a characteristic skull shape and dentition.

- Suborder: Feliformia
  - Family: Felidae (cats)
    - Subfamily: Felinae
      - Genus: Felis
        - European wildcat, F. silvestris LC
- Suborder: Caniformia
  - Family: Canidae (dogs, foxes)
    - Genus: Canis
      - Golden jackal, C. aureus LC
      - Gray wolf, C. lupus LC
        - Eurasian wolf, C. l. lupus
    - Genus: Vulpes
      - Red fox, V. vulpes LC
  - Family: Ursidae (bears)
    - Genus: Ursus
      - Brown bear, U. arctos LC
        - Eurasian brown bear, U. a. arctos
  - Family: Mustelidae (mustelids)
    - Genus: Lutra
      - European otter, L. lutra NT
    - Genus: Martes
      - Beech marten, M. foina LC
    - Genus: Meles
      - European badger, M. meles LC
    - Genus: Mustela
      - Steppe polecat, M. eversmannii LC
      - European mink, M. lutreola CR
      - Stoat, M. erminea LC
      - Least weasel, M. nivalis LC
      - European polecat, M. putorius LC
    - Genus: Neogale
      - American mink, N. vison LC introduced
    - Genus: Vormela
      - Marbled polecat, V. peregusna VU

== Order: Perissodactyla (odd-toed ungulates) ==
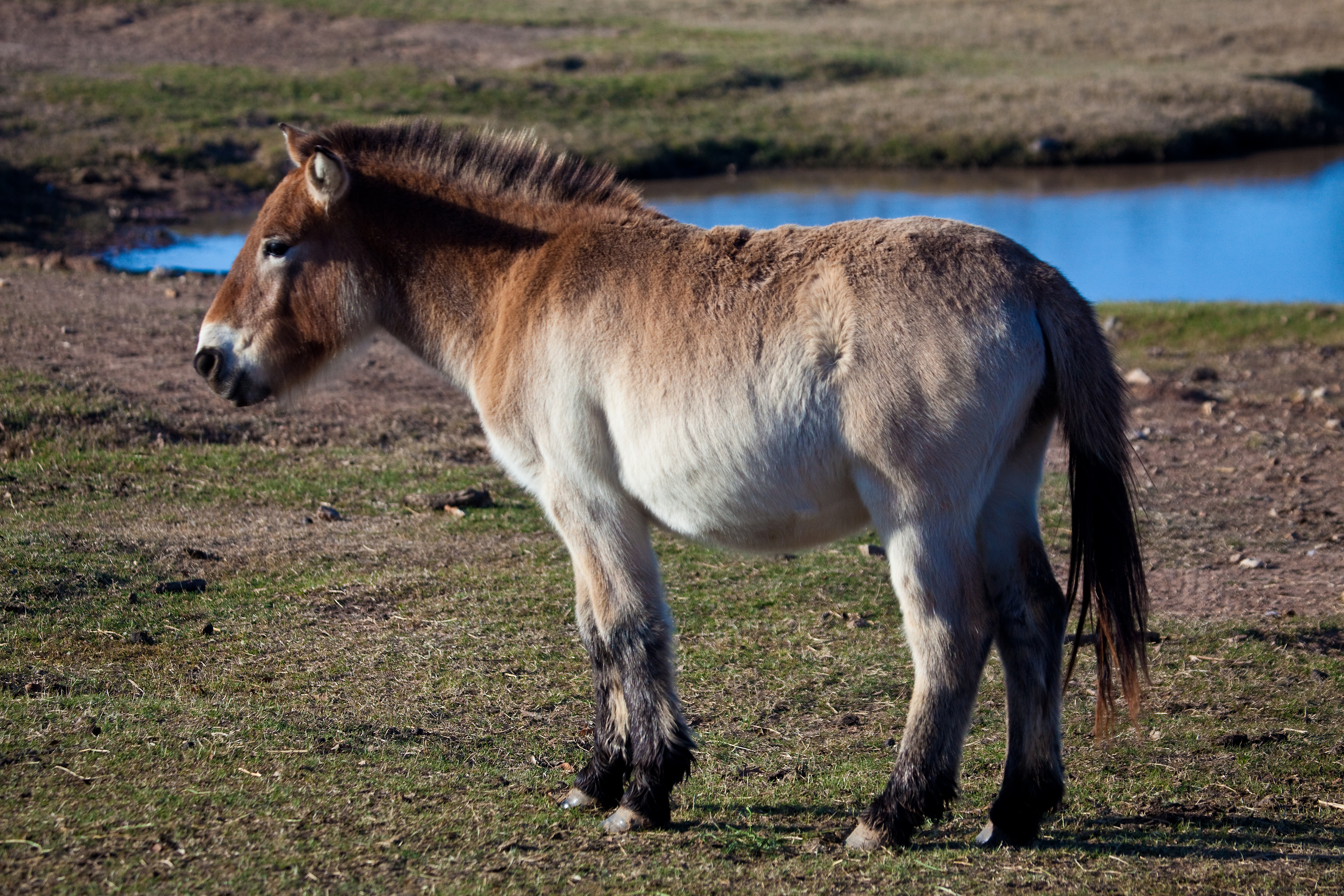
Przewalski's horse

The odd-toed ungulates are browsing and grazing mammals. They are usually large to very large, and have relatively simple stomachs and a large middle toe.

- Family: Equidae (horses etc.)
  - Genus: Equus
    - Wild horse, E. ferus EN reintroduced
      - Przewalski's horse, E. f. przewalskii EN reintroduced
    - Onager, E. hemionus NT reintroduced
      - Turkmenian kulan, E. h. kulan EN reintroduced

== Order: Artiodactyla (even-toed ungulates) ==
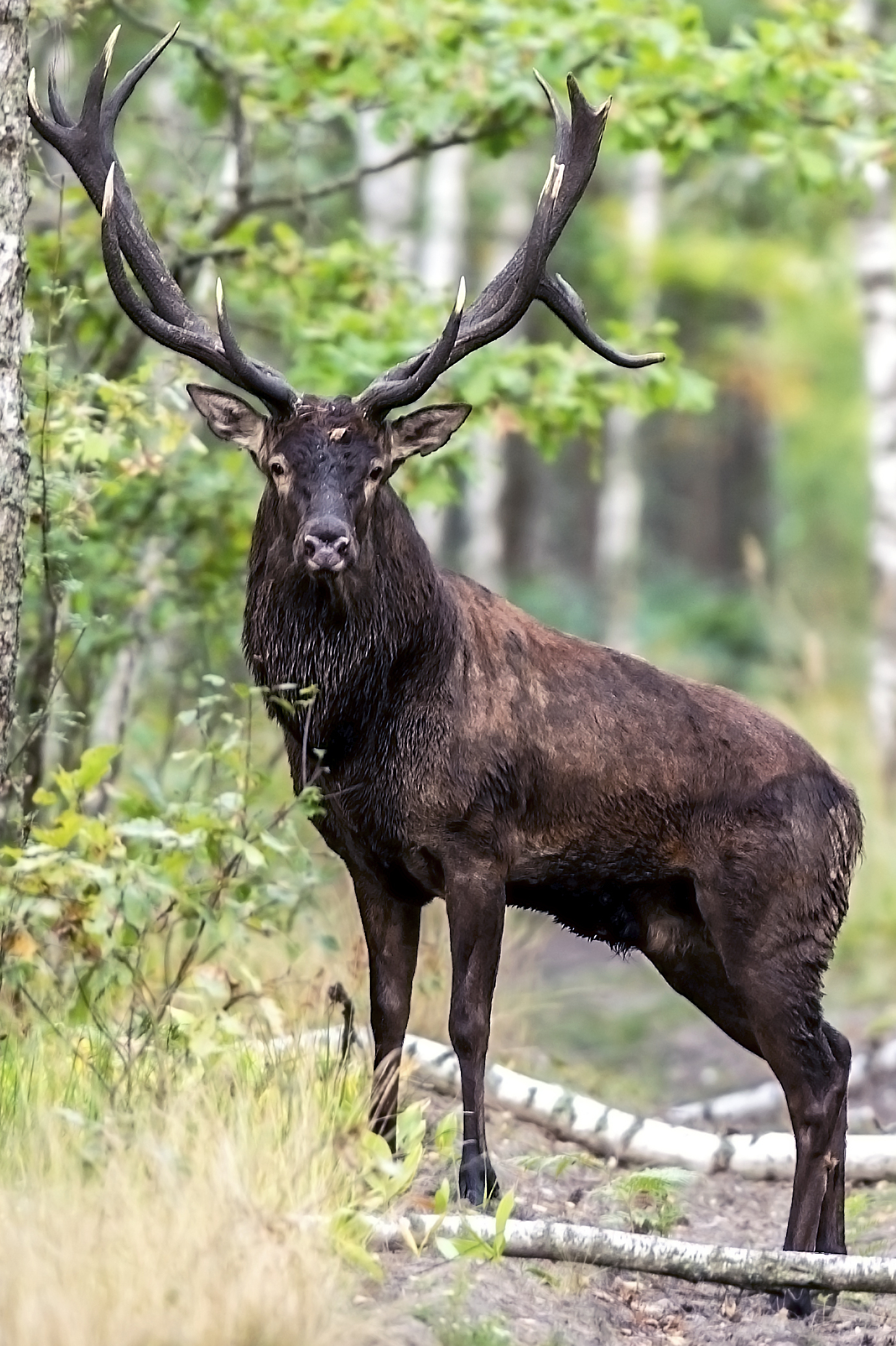
Crimean red deer

The even-toed ungulates are ungulates whose weight is borne about equally by the third and fourth toes, rather than mostly or entirely by the third as in perissodactyls. There are about 220 artiodactyl species, including many that are of great economic importance to humans.

- Family: Bovidae (cattle, antelope, sheep, goats)
  - Subfamily: Bovinae
    - Genus: Bison
      - European bison, B. bonasus NT reintroduced
        - Carpathian wisent, B. b. hungarorum EX
- Family: Cervidae (deer)
  - Subfamily: Capreolinae
    - Genus: Alces
      - Elk, A. alces LC
    - Genus: Capreolus
      - Roe deer, C. capreolus LC
  - Subfamily: Cervinae
    - Genus: Cervus
      - Red deer, C. elaphus LC
        - Crimean red deer, C. e. brauneri
    - Genus: Dama
      - European fallow deer, D. dama LC introduced
- Family: Suidae (pigs)
  - Subfamily: Suinae
    - Genus: Sus
      - Wild boar, S. scrofa LC

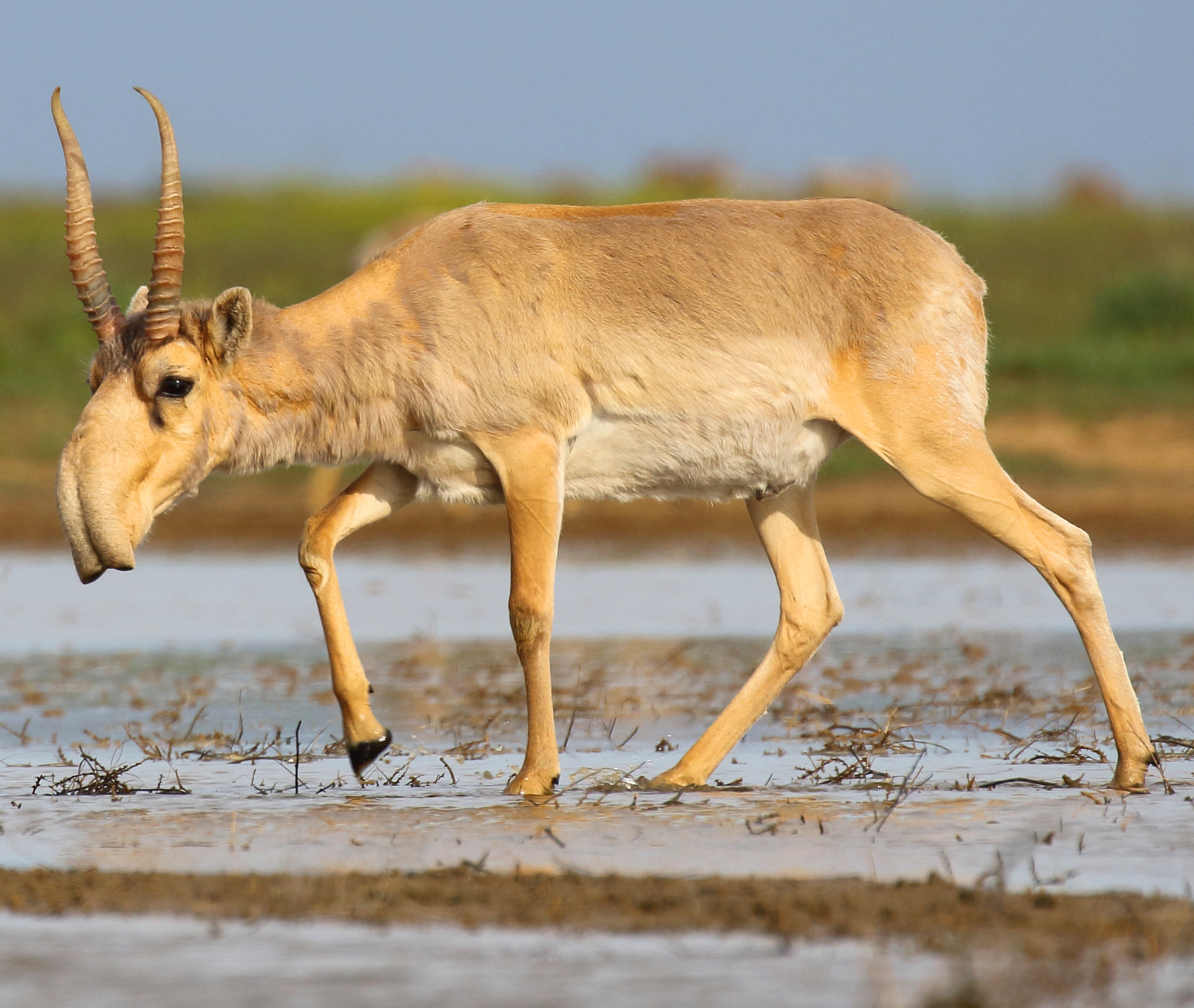
Saiga antelope

== Locally extinct ==
- Siberian roe deer, Capreolus pygargus
- Common bent-wing bat, Miniopterus schreibersii
- Mediterranean monk seal, Monachus monachus
- Saiga antelope, Saiga tartarica
- Tiger, Panthera tigris vagrant

== See also ==
- Fauna of Ukraine
- List of chordate orders
- List of prehistoric mammals
- Lists of mammals by region
- Mammal classification
- List of mammals described in the 2000s
