= Desman (disambiguation) =

Desman may refer to:

- Desman, a snouted and naked-tailed diving insectivore of the tribe Desmanini
  - Pyrenean desman
  - Russian desman, also known as Desmana
- Shawn Desman, Canadian singer
