= Magnatalpa =

Magnatalpa Temporal range: Zanclean

Scientific classification
- Kingdom: Animalia
- Phylum: Chordata
- Class: Mammalia
- Order: Eulipotyphla
- Family: Talpidae
- Subfamily: Talpinae
- Tribe: Desmanini
- Genus: †Magnatalpa
- Species: †M. fumamons

Binomial name
- †Magnatalpa fumamons Oberg & Samuels, 2022

Extinct genus of mammals

Magnatalpa is an extinct genus of desman that lived during the Zanclean stage of the Pliocene epoch.

== Distribution ==
Magnatalpa fumamons is known from fossils found in the Gray Fossil Site of Tennessee.
