= Desmana marci =

Desmana marci Temporal range: Early Pliocene

Scientific classification
- Kingdom: Animalia
- Phylum: Chordata
- Class: Mammalia
- Infraclass: Placentalia
- Order: Eulipotyphla
- Family: Talpidae
- Genus: Desmana
- Species: †D. marci

Binomial name
- †Desmana marci Minwer-Barakat et al., 2020

Extinct species of mammal

Desmana marci is an extinct species of Desmana that inhabited Spain during the Early Pliocene.
