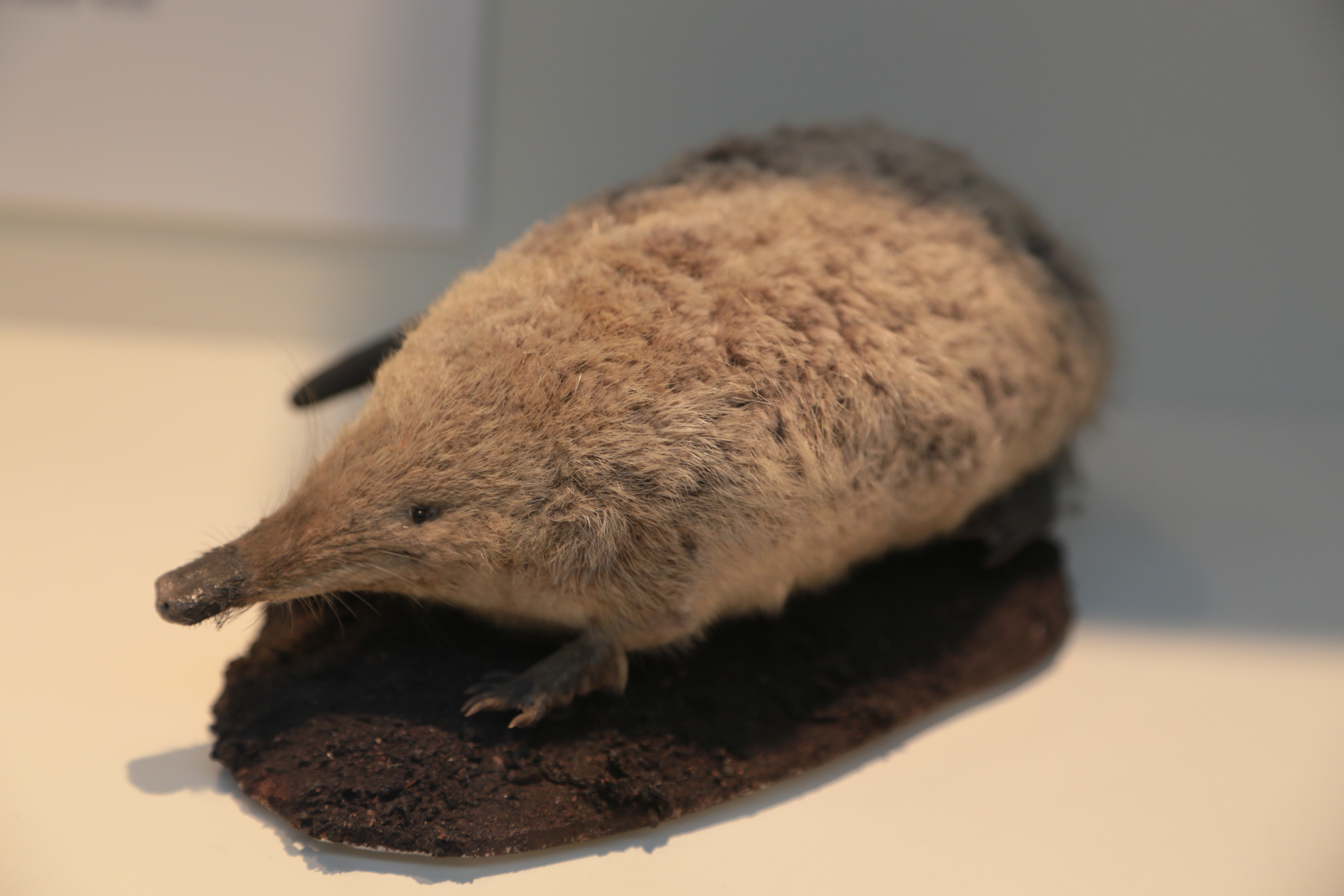
- Russian desman (Desmana moschata)

Scientific classification
- Kingdom: Animalia
- Phylum: Chordata
- Class: Mammalia
- Order: Eulipotyphla
- Family: Talpidae
- Tribe: Desmanini
- Genus: Desmana; Güldenstädt, 1777

Type species
- Castor moschatus Linnaeus, 1758

Species
- Desmana moschata; †Desmana inflata; †Desmana kowalskae; †Desmana marci; †Desmana nehringi; †Desmana thermalis; †Desmana verestchagini

= Desmana =

Desmana Temporal range: Early Pliocene – Recent

Genus of mammals

Desmana is a genus of mole that contains a single living species, the Russian desman (Desmana moschata). A number of fossil species are known from throughout Eurasia.

The oldest species is Desmana marci from the earliest Pliocene of Spain. It was probably derived from earlier moles of the genus Archaeodesmana. D. marci likely gave rise to D. verestchagini, who may have given rise to younger species such as the living desman.
