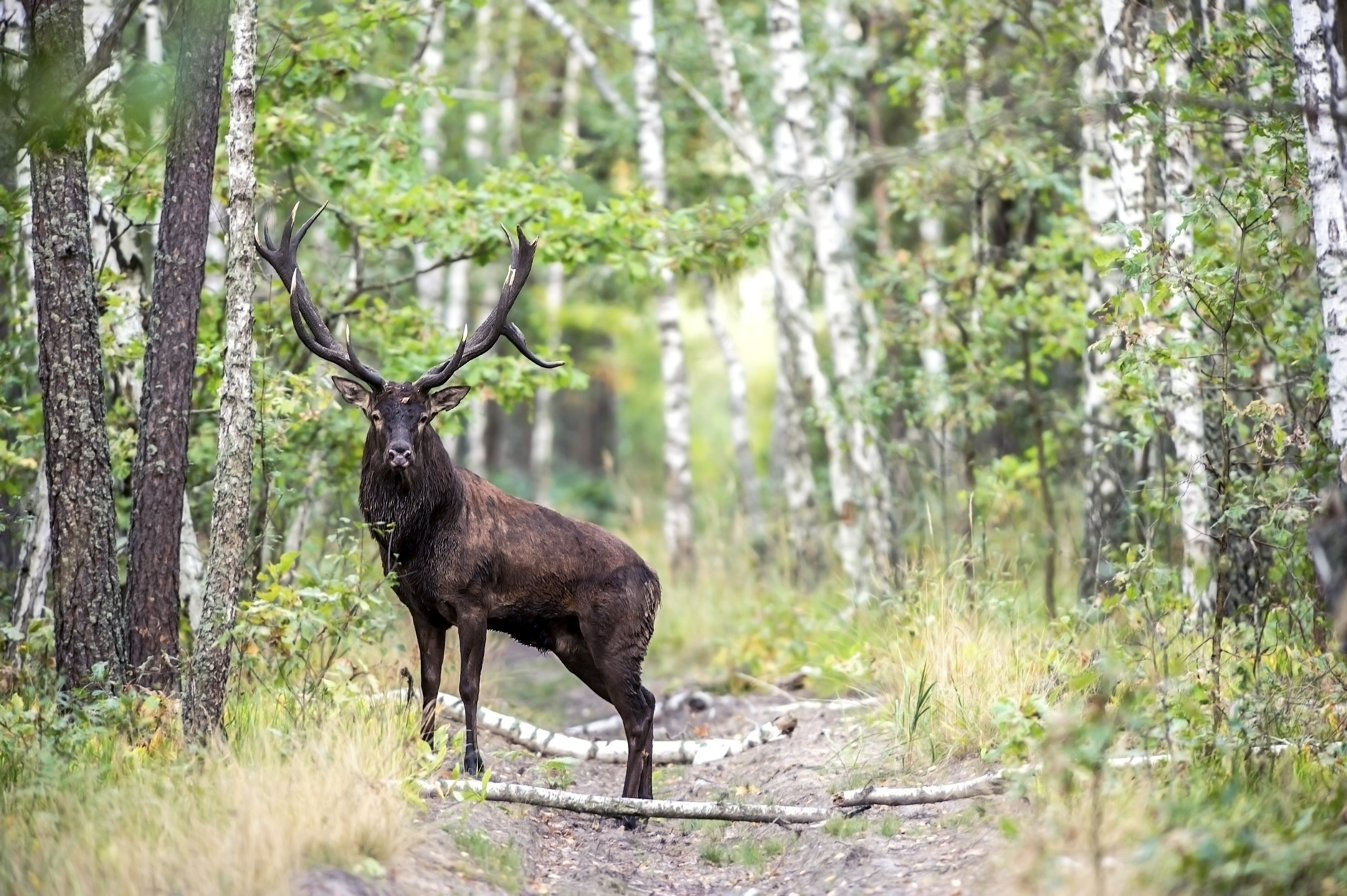

Scientific classification
- Kingdom: Animalia
- Phylum: Chordata
- Class: Mammalia
- Order: Artiodactyla
- Family: Cervidae
- Genus: Cervus
- Species: C. elaphus
- Subspecies: C. e. brauneri

Trinomial name
- Cervus elaphus brauneri Charlemagne, 1920

= Crimean red deer =

Subspecies of deer

The Crimean red deer (Cervus elaphus brauneri) also known as Brauner's red deer, is a subspecies of the red deer that is native to the southern Crimean Peninsula, Russian-occupied territory of Ukraine.

== Description ==
They are very similar in color and appearance to the main subspecies of the red deer, but may be a bit smaller, although this can not be proven. Brown to a red colored coat or hide, with semi-large antlers, long ears, and a partially distinctive snout color pattern. The fur on their snouts are somewhat different from other subspecies, but generally from a distance looks the same.
