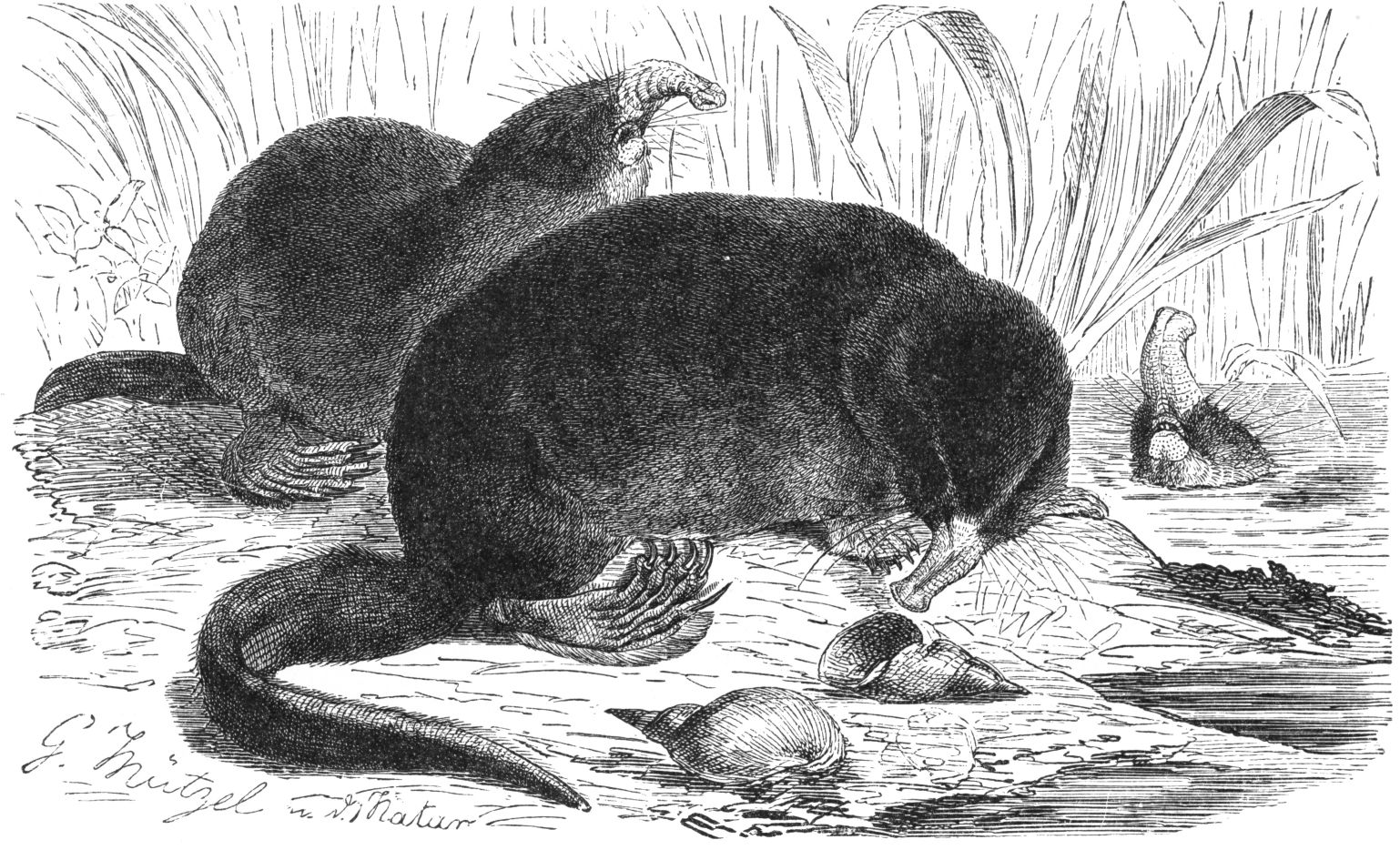
- Russian desman (Desmana moschata)

Scientific classification
- Kingdom: Animalia
- Phylum: Chordata
- Class: Mammalia
- Order: Eulipotyphla
- Family: Talpidae
- Subfamily: Talpinae
- Tribe: Desmanini; Thomas, 1912

Living genera
- Desmana; Galemys; For fossil genera, see text
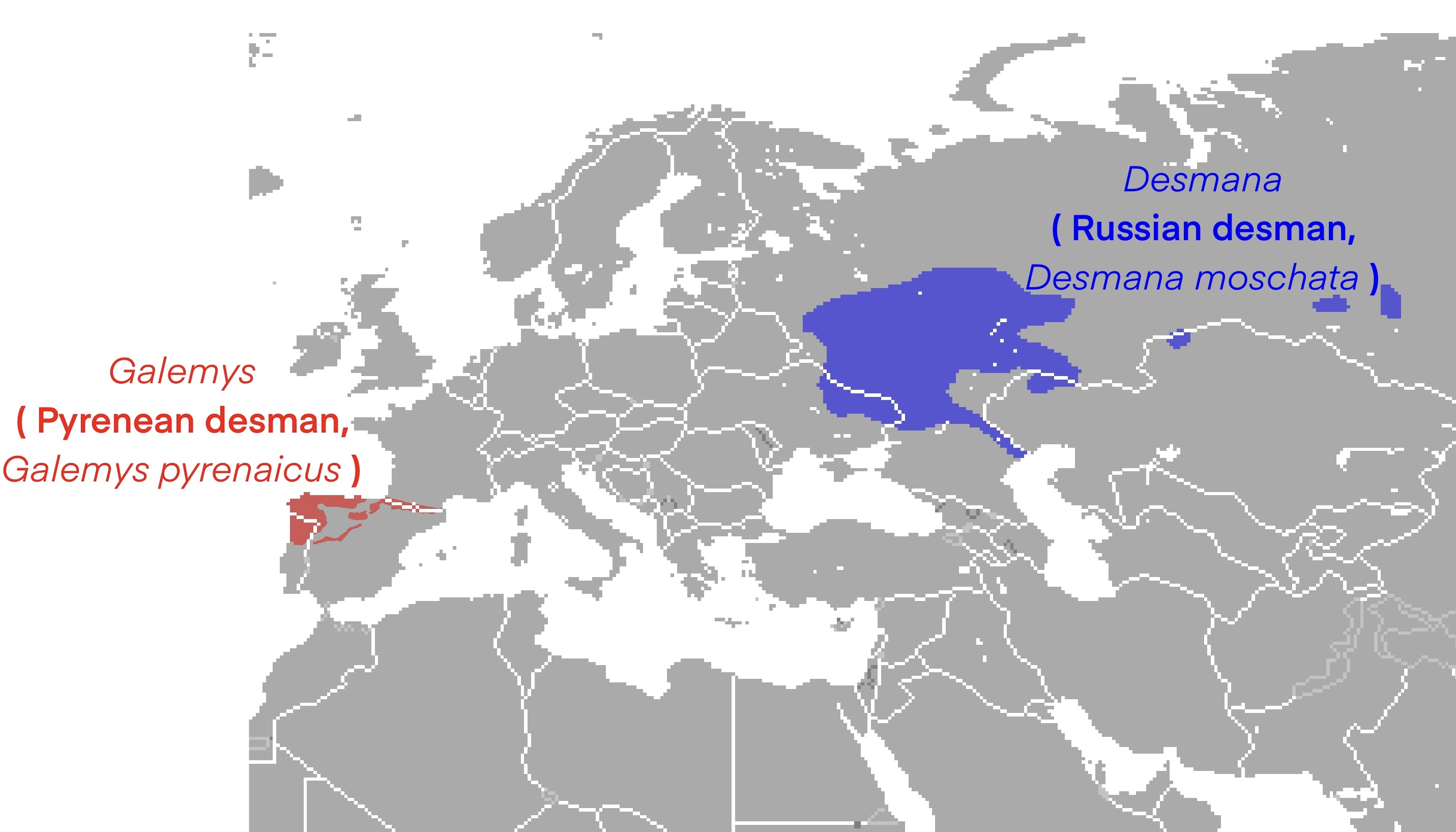

= Desman =

Desmanini Temporal range: Late Oligocene–Recent

Subfamily of Eurasian insectivores

Desmans are aquatic insectivores of the tribe Desmanini (also considered a subfamily, Desmaninae) in the mole family, Talpidae.

This tribe consists of two living species found in Europe: the Russian desman (Desmana moschata) in European Russia, and the Pyrenean desman (Galemys pyrenaicus) in the northwest of the Iberian Peninsula and the Pyrenees. Both species are endangered, the Russian desman critically so. They have webbed paws and their front paws are not well-adapted for digging. Desmans were much more diverse and widespread during the Miocene, with two genera, Gaillardia and Magnatalpa, being present in North America. Both living species are thought to have derived from the fossil genus Archaeodesmana.

== Species ==
- Genus Desmana
  - Russian desman (D. moschata)
  - †Desmana kowalskae
  - †Desmana nehringi
  - †Desmana inflata
  - †Desmana thermalis
  - †Desmana marci
- Genus Galemys
  - Pyrenean desman (G. pyrenaicus)
  - †Galemys kormosi
  - †Galemys semseyi
  - †Galemys sulimskii
- Genus †Asthenoscapter Miocene, Europe
- Genus †Archaeodesmana Miocene-Pliocene, Europe
- Genus †Desmanella Miocene, Europe
- Genus †Gaillardia Miocene, North America
- Genus †Mygalinia Late Miocene, Hungary
- Genus †Magnatalpa Miocene-Pliocene, North America
- Genus †Ruemkelia

== Gallery ==
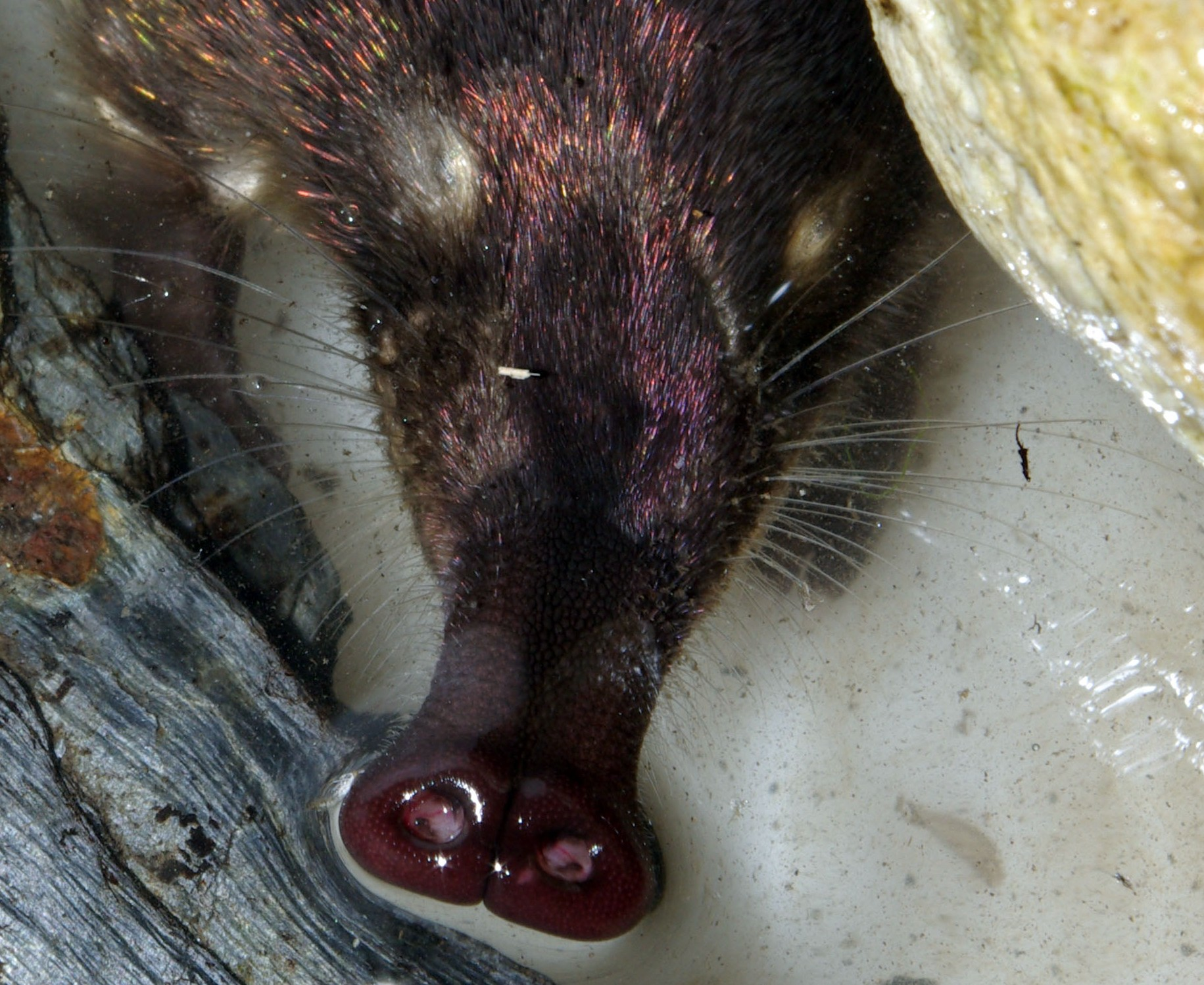
The bare snout of Galemys pyrenaicus

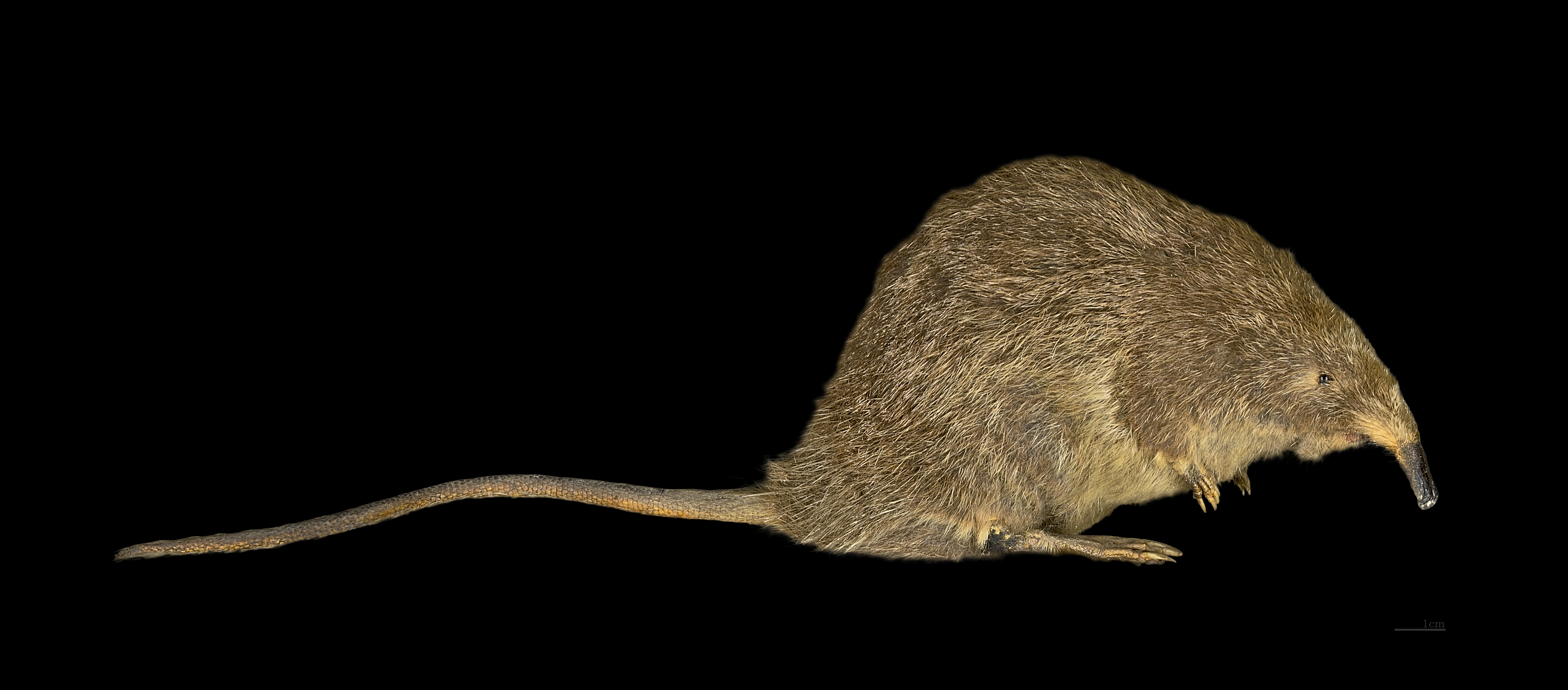
Galemys pyrenaicus

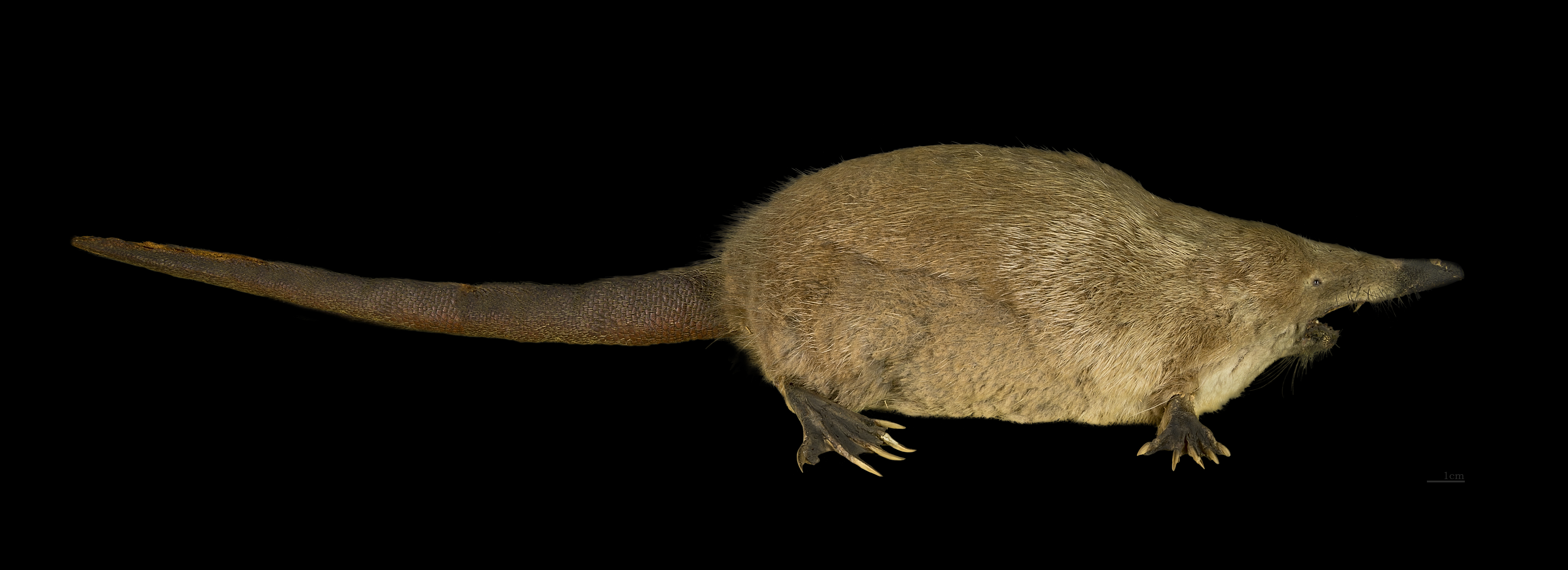
Desmana moschata

== In the media ==
- Morelle, Rebecca (2012-09-04). "Pyrenean desman: On the trail of Europe's weirdest beast". BBC News Online. "video report"
- "Russians rally for water mammal". BBC News Online. 2006-06-09.
