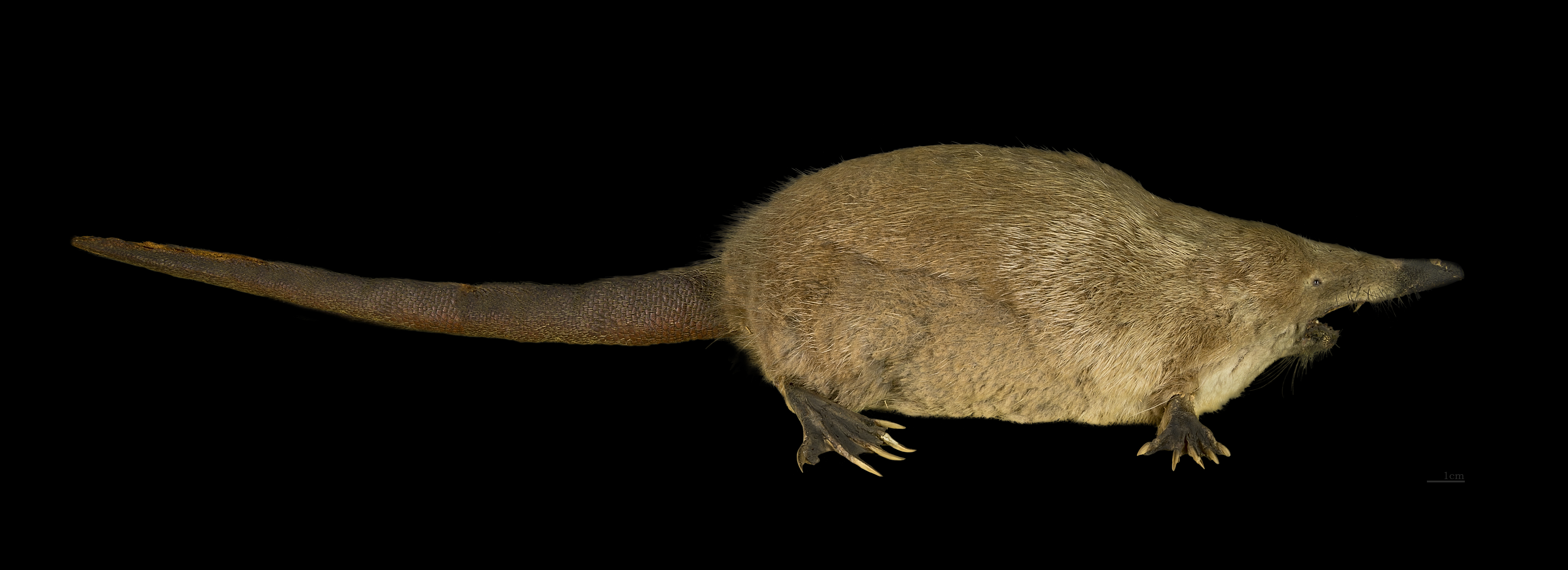

Conservation status
- Critically Endangered (IUCN 3.1)

Scientific classification
- Kingdom: Animalia
- Phylum: Chordata
- Class: Mammalia
- Infraclass: Placentalia
- Order: Eulipotyphla
- Family: Talpidae
- Genus: Desmana
- Species: D. moschata

Binomial name
- Desmana moschata (Linnaeus, 1758)
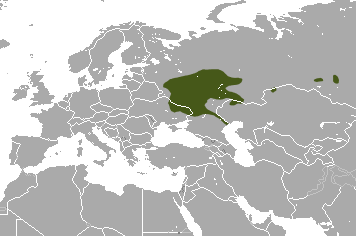
- Russian desman range

Synonyms
- Castor moschatus Linnaeus, 1758

= Russian desman =

Species of mammal

The Russian desman (Desmana moschata; Russian: выхухоль vykhukhol') is a small semiaquatic mammal that inhabits the Volga, Don and Ural River basins in Russia. Some authorities, citing old Soviet sources, claim the animal can be found in Eastern Ukraine and Northern Kazakhstan, but, as of 2020, the accuracy of such claims is disputed. It constructs burrows into the banks of ponds and slow-moving streams, but prefers small, overgrown ponds with abundance of insects, crayfish and amphibians. The Russian desman often lives in small groups of two to five animals, that are usually not related, and appears to have a complex (but largely unstudied) communication and social system.

== Taxonomy ==
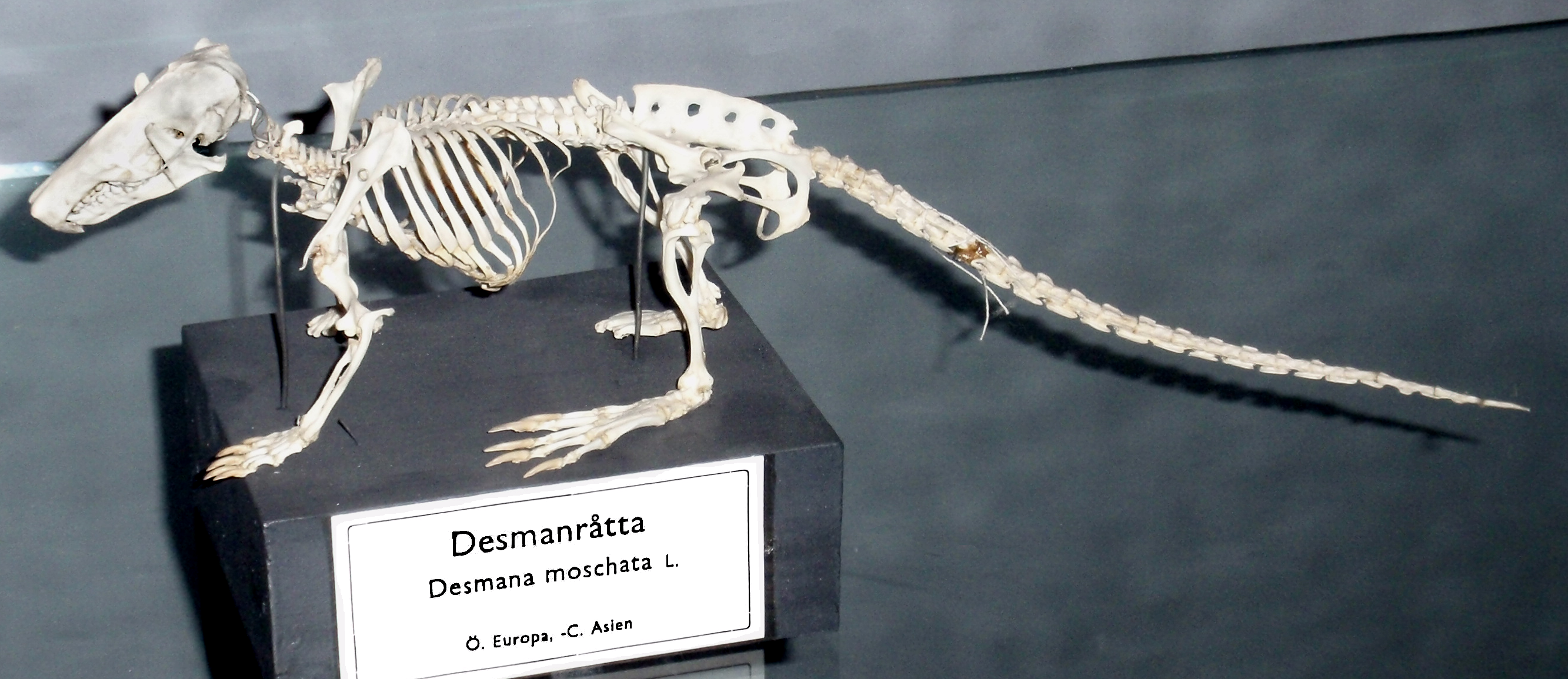
Skeleton.

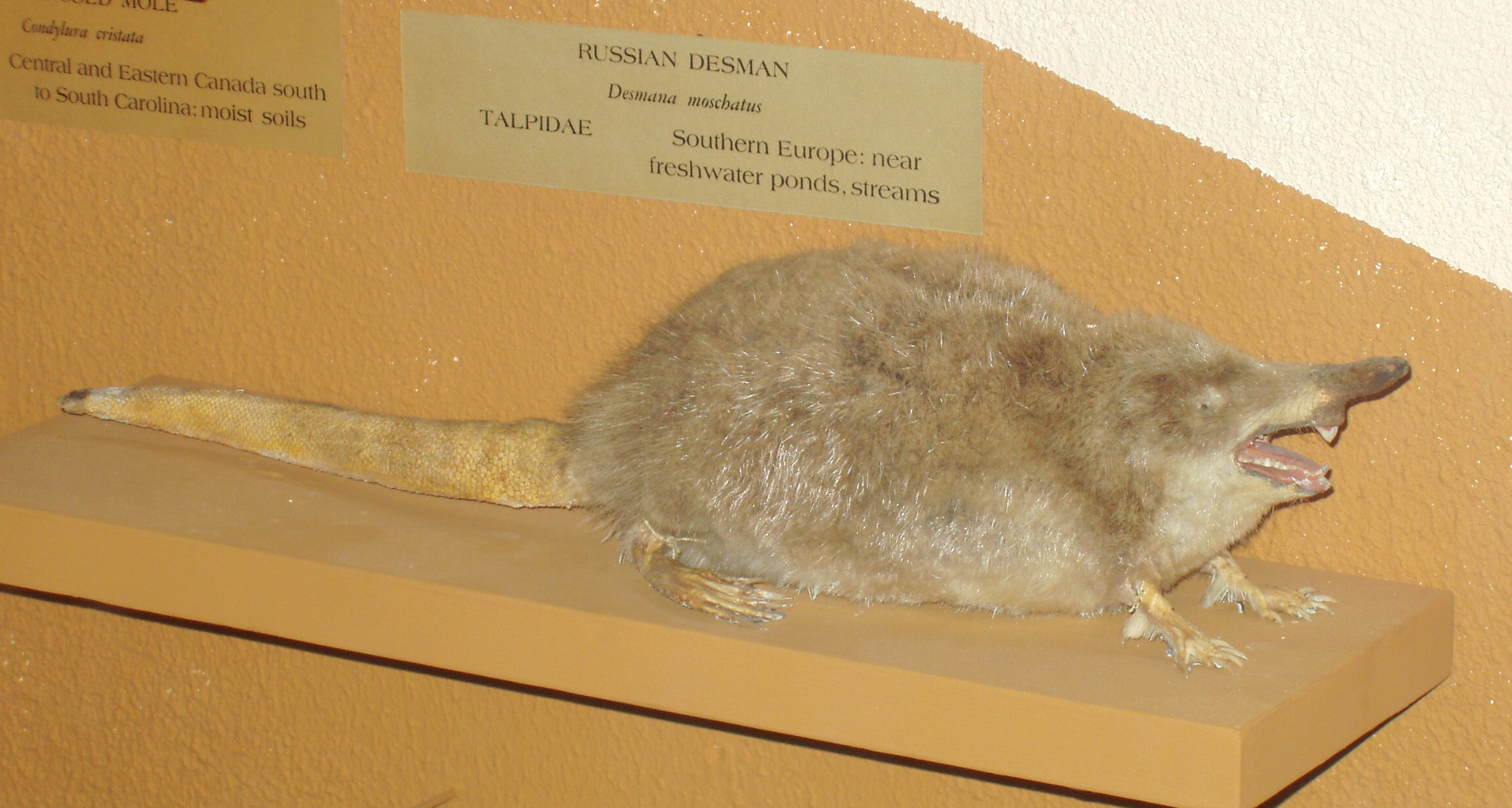
Mounted specimen.

The Russian desman is one of two surviving species of the tribe Desmanini, the other being the Pyrenean desman. Despite its outward similarity to muskrats (a rodent), the Russian desman is actually part of the mole family Talpidae in the order Eulipotyphla. Like other moles, it is functionally blind and obtains much of its sensory input from the touch-sensitive Eimer's organs at the end of its long, bilobed snout. However, the hind feet are webbed and the tail is laterally flattened —specializations for its aquatic habitat. The body is 18 to 21 cm (7.1 to 8.3 in) long while the tail is 17 to 20 cm (6.7 to 7.9 in) in length. Easily the largest species of mole, it weighs 400 to 520 g (14 to 18 oz).

Decidedly rich and thick in nature, desman fur used to be highly sought after by the fur trade. In the Middle Ages, desmans were also hunted for castoreum. Consequently, the Russian desman is now a protected species under Russian law. However, due to loss of habitat (farming), water pollution, illegal fishing nets, and the introduction of non-native species like muskrat, population levels continue to decline. In the mid-1970s, an estimated 70,000 desmans were left in the wild; by 2004, the figure was only 35,000. Between 1929 and 1999, more than 10,000 desmans were released into zapovedniks and other protected territories in Southern Siberia and elsewhere with the view to expand their range.

== Distribution and habitat ==
Russian desman's natural habitat is limited to the Dnieper and Don river basins in Russia. It is an endemic and highly endangered species. A 1961 attempt to acclimatize desmans in the Tobol river basin in Western Siberia was semi-successful.

According to a 2020 report, the number of desmans is estimated at 6,000. From 2009 to 2011, the Don Basin rivers in Saratov Oblast were searched for Russian desman to evaluate if this environment was sustainable for the species. No evidence was found that the species lives in this area but if so, the population was very small. The limiting factors consist of global factors, interspecific processes, and new immigrating species in the river ecosystem.

== Characteristics ==
Russian desman provide comfort to themselves by grooming. More specifically, scratching with hind feet, washing, biting out of nails, and biting out of fur. The main reasons for these actions are supporting the air layer and heat-insulating properties of fur.
