= List of spalacids =

Species in mammal family Spalacidae

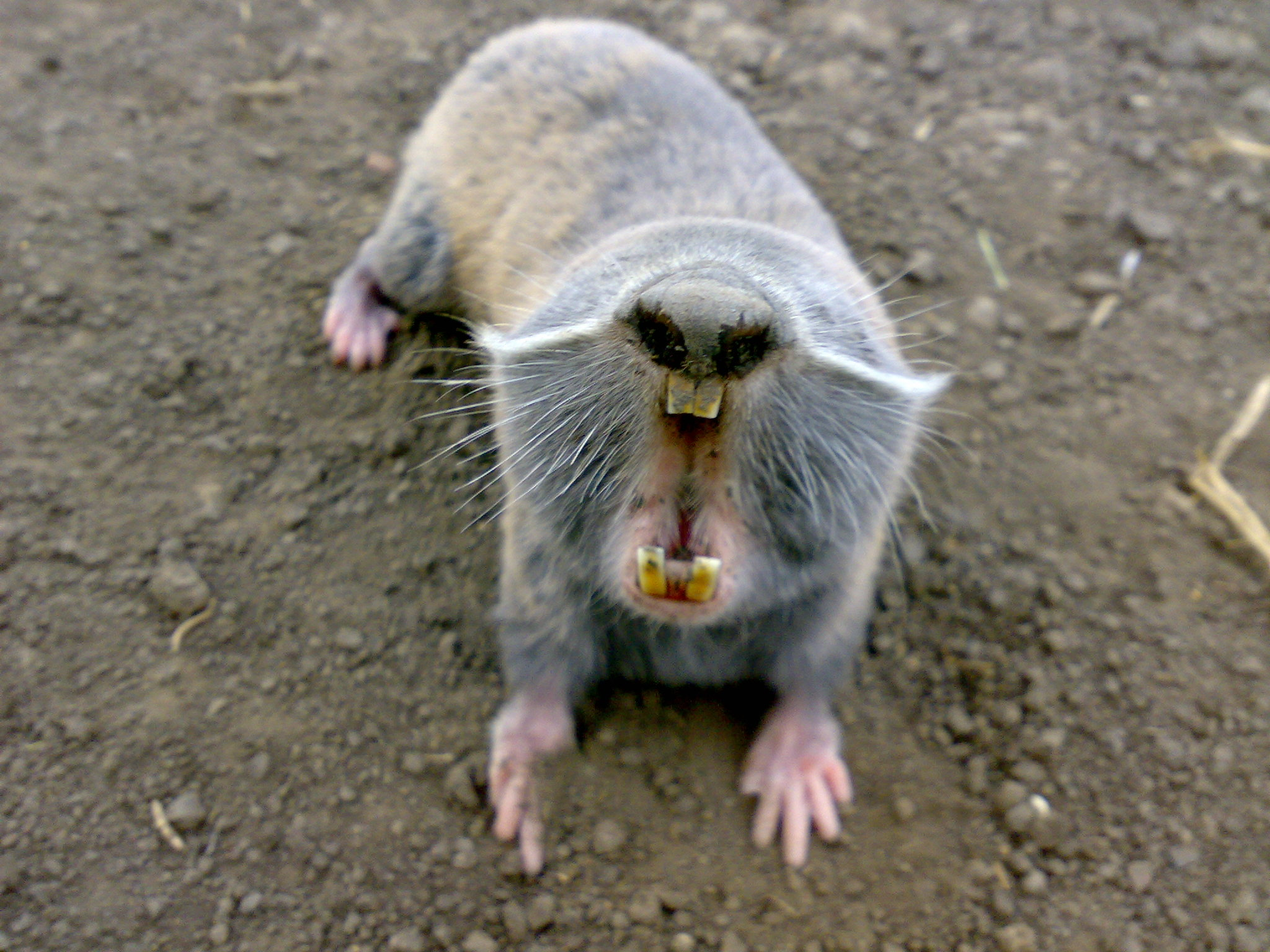
Greater blind mole-rat (Spalax microphthalmus)

Spalacidae is a family of mammals in the order Rodentia and part of the Myomorpha suborder. Members of this family are called spalacids, and include blind mole-rats, bamboo rats, mole-rats, and zokors. They are found in Asia, eastern Africa, and eastern Europe, primarily in forests, shrublands, and grasslands, though some species can be found in deserts or savannas. They range in size from the Middle East blind mole-rat, at 13 cm (5 in) with no tail, to the large bamboo rat, at 48 cm (19 in) plus a 20 cm (8 in) tail. Spalacids are primarily herbivores, and eat roots, bulbs, tubers, grass, and seeds, with some species also eating insects. Few spalacids have population estimates, but four species—the giant root-rat, Mehely's blind mole-rat, Podolsk blind mole-rat, and sandy blind mole-rat—are categorized as endangered, while the Oltenia blind mole-rat is categorized as critically endangered.

The 23 extant species of Spalacidae are divided into 7 genera, grouped into 3 subfamilies. Myospalacinae contains 6 species of zokors in 2 genera, Rhizomyinae contains 6 species of bamboo rats and mole-rats in 3 genera, and Spalacinae contains 11 species of blind mole-rats in 2 genera. Several extinct prehistoric spalacid species have been discovered, though due to ongoing research and discoveries, the exact number and categorization is not fixed.

== Conventions ==
IUCN Red List categories
Conservation status
- EX: Extinct (0 species)
- EW: Extinct in the wild (0 species)
- CR: Critically endangered (1 species)
- EN: Endangered (4 species)
- VU: Vulnerable (1 species)
- NT: Near threatened (0 species)
- LC: Least concern (17 species)

The author citation for the species or genus is given after the scientific name; parentheses around the author citation indicate that this was not the original taxonomic placement. Conservation status codes listed follow the International Union for Conservation of Nature (IUCN) Red List of Threatened Species. Range maps are provided wherever possible; if a range map is not available, a description of the spalacid's range is provided. Ranges are based on the IUCN Red List for that species unless otherwise noted.

== Classification ==
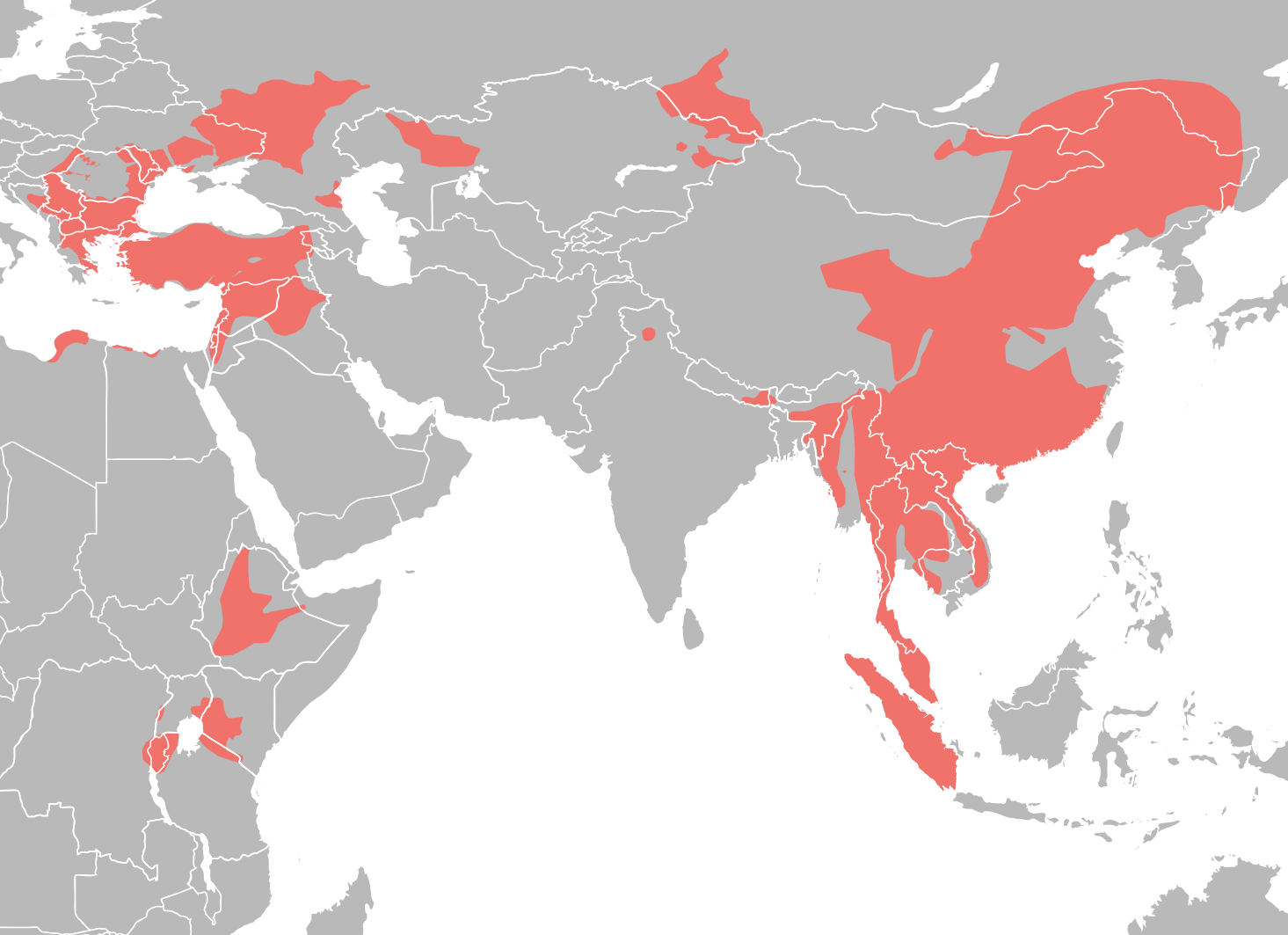
Spalacidae distribution

Spalacidae is a family consisting of 23 extant species in 7 genera. These genera are divided into four subfamilies: Myospalacinae, containing 6 species of in 2 genera; Rhizomyinae, containing 6 species in 3 genera; and Spalacinae, containing 11 species in 2 genera. This does not include hybrid species or extinct prehistoric species.

Family Spalacidae

- Subfamily Myospalacinae
  - Genus Eospalax (Chinese zokors): three species
  - Genus Myospalax (zokors): three species
- Subfamily Rhizomyinae
  - Genus Cannomys (lesser bamboo rat): one species
  - Genus Rhizomys (bamboo rats): three species
  - Genus Tachyoryctes (African mole-rats): two species
- Subfamily Spalacinae
  - Genus Nannospalax (small-bodied mole-rats): three species
  - Genus Spalax (blind mole-rats): eight species

- Spalacidae
  - - Spalacinae
      - Nannospalax
      - Spalax
  - - Myospalacinae
      - - Eospalax
        - Myospalax
    - Rhizomyinae
      - - Cannomys
        - Rhizomys
      - Tachyoryctes

== Spalacids ==
The following classification is based on the taxonomy described by the reference work Mammal Species of the World (2005), with augmentation by generally accepted proposals made since using molecular phylogenetic analysis, as supported by both the IUCN and the American Society of Mammalogists.

=== Subfamily Myospalacinae ===
Genus Eospalax – Allen, 1938 – three species
Common name	Scientific name and subspecies	Range	Size and ecology	IUCN status and estimated population
Chinese zokor	E. fontanierii (H. Milne-Edwards, 1867)	Central China	Size: 16–24 cm (6–9 in) long, plus 3–7 cm (1–3 in) tail Habitat: Shrubland and grassland Diet: Roots and grains	LC Unknown
Rothschild's zokor	E. rothschildi (Thomas, 1911)	Central China	Size: 14–18 cm (6–7 in) long, plus 2–4 cm (1–2 in) tail Habitat: Forest, shrubland, and grassland Diet: Roots and grains	LC Unknown
Smith's zokor	E. smithii (Thomas, 1911)	Central China	Size: 16–25 cm (6–10 in) long, plus 3–4 cm (1–2 in) tail Habitat: Grassland Diet: Roots and grains	LC Unknown

Genus Myospalax – Laxmann, 1769 – three species
Common name	Scientific name and subspecies	Range	Size and ecology	IUCN status and estimated population
False zokor	M. aspalax (Pallas, 1776)	Mongolia, southern Russia, and northern China	Size: 16–21 cm (6–8 in) long, plus 3–7 cm (1–3 in) tail Habitat: Forest and shrubland Diet: Roots and grains	LC Unknown
Siberian zokor	M. myospalax (Laxmann, 1773)	Kazakhstan, southern Russia, and northern China	Size: 20–27 cm (8–11 in) long, plus about 5 cm (2 in) tail Habitat: Grassland Diet: Roots and grains	LC Unknown
Transbaikal zokor	M. psilurus (H. Milne-Edwards, 1874)	Mongolia, southern Russia, and northern China	Size: 20–27 cm (8–11 in) long, plus 3–6 cm (1–2 in) tail Habitat: Shrubland, grassland, and desert Diet: Roots and grains	LC Unknown

=== Subfamily Rhizomyinae ===
Genus Cannomys – Thomas, 1915 – one species
Common name	Scientific name and subspecies	Range	Size and ecology	IUCN status and estimated population
Lesser bamboo rat	C. badius (Hodgson, 1841)	Southeastern Asia	Size: 14–26 cm (6–10 in) long, plus 4–10 cm (2–4 in) tail Habitat: Forest Diet: Shrubs, shoots, and roots	LC Unknown

Genus Rhizomys – Gray, 1831 – three species
Common name	Scientific name and subspecies	Range	Size and ecology	IUCN status and estimated population
Chinese bamboo rat	R. sinensis Gray, 1831	China, Myanmar, and Vietnam	Size: 22–45 cm (9–18 in) long, plus 5–10 cm (2–4 in) tail Habitat: Forest Diet: Bamboo roots, as well as grass, seeds, and fruit	LC Unknown
Hoary bamboo rat	R. pruinosus Blyth, 1851	India and southeastern Asia	Size: 24–35 cm (9–14 in) long, plus 9–13 cm (4–5 in) tail Habitat: Forest and grassland Diet: Bamboo roots, as well as grass, seeds, and fruit	LC Unknown
Large bamboo rat	R. sumatrensis (Raffles, 1821)	Southeastern Asia	Size: 26–48 cm (10–19 in) long, plus 10–20 cm (4–8 in) tail Habitat: Forest Diet: Bamboo roots, as well as grass, seeds, and fruit	LC Unknown

Genus Tachyoryctes – Rüppell, 1835 – two species
Common name	Scientific name and subspecies	Range	Size and ecology	IUCN status and estimated population
Giant root-rat	T. macrocephalus Rüppell, 1842	Ethiopia	Size: 22–31 cm (9–12 in) long, plus 4–7 cm (2–3 in) tail Habitat: Grassland Diet: Roots, rhizomes, tubers, bulbs, and corms, as well as grass and legumes	EN Unknown
Northeast African mole-rat	T. splendens (Rüppell, 1836)	Eastern Africa	Size: 15–27 cm (6–11 in) long, plus 4–10 cm (2–4 in) tail Habitat: Forest, savanna, shrubland, and grassland Diet: Roots, rhizomes, tubers, bulbs, and corms, as well as grass and legumes	LC Unknown

=== Subfamily Spalacinae ===
Genus Nannospalax – Palmer, 1903 – three species
Common name	Scientific name and subspecies	Range	Size and ecology	IUCN status and estimated population
Anatolian blind mole-rat	N. xanthodon (Nordmann, 1840)	Western Asia	Size: 14–25 cm (6–10 in) long, with no tail Habitat: Grassland Diet: Roots, tubers, acorns, plant stems, and other plant parts	LC Unknown
Lesser blind mole-rat	N. leucodon (Nordmann, 1840)	Southeastern Europe	Size: 15–24 cm (6–9 in) long, with no tail Habitat: Grassland Diet: Roots, tubers, acorns, plant stems, and other plant parts	LC Unknown
Middle East blind mole-rat	N. ehrenbergi (Nehring, 1898)	Middle East and northeastern Africa	Size: 13–22 cm (5–9 in) long, with no tail Habitat: Shrubland, grassland, and desert Diet: Roots, tubers, acorns, plant stems, and other plant parts	LC Unknown

Genus Spalax – Güldenstädt, 1770 – eight species
Common name	Scientific name and subspecies	Range	Size and ecology	IUCN status and estimated population
Bukovina blind mole-rat	S. graecus Nehring, 1898	Romania and southwestern Ukraine	Size: 22–28 cm (9–11 in) long, with no tail Habitat: Grassland Diet: Roots, bulbs, tubers, grass, and seeds, as well as insects	VU Unknown
Giant blind mole-rat	S. giganteus Nehring, 1898	Southwestern Russia	Size: 25–35 cm (10–14 in) long, with no tail Habitat: Shrubland and grassland Diet: Roots, bulbs, tubers, grass, and seeds, as well as insects	LC Unknown
Greater blind mole-rat	S. microphthalmus Güldenstädt, 1770	Ukraine and southwestern Russia	Size: 19–31 cm (7–12 in) long, with no tail Habitat: Shrubland and grassland Diet: Roots, bulbs, tubers, grass, and seeds, as well as insects	LC Unknown
Kazakhstan blind mole-rat	S. uralensis Tiflov & Usov, 1939	Kazakhstan	Size: About 31 cm (12 in) long, with no tail Habitat: Grassland Diet: Roots, bulbs, tubers, grass, and seeds, as well as insects	LC Unknown
Mehely's blind mole-rat	S. antiquus Méhely, 1909	Romania	Size: Unknown Habitat: Grassland Diet: Roots, bulbs, tubers, grass, and seeds, as well as insects	EN 3,500–3,800
Oltenia blind mole-rat	S. istricus Méhely, 1909	Romania	Size: About 24 cm (9 in) long, with no tail Habitat: Grassland Diet: Roots, bulbs, tubers, grass, and seeds, as well as insects	CR Unknown
Podolsk blind mole-rat	S. zemni Erxleben, 1777	Ukraine	Size: 20–31 cm (8–12 in) long, with no tail Habitat: Forest and grassland Diet: Roots, bulbs, tubers, grass, and seeds, as well as insects	EN Unknown
Sandy blind mole-rat	S. arenarius Reshetnik, 1939	Ukraine	Size: 19–27 cm (7–11 in) long, with no tail Habitat: Grassland Diet: Roots, bulbs, tubers, grass, and seeds, as well as insects	EN Unknown

== Sources ==
- Chernasky, Amy; Motis, Anna; Burgin, Connor, eds. (2023). All the Mammals of the World. Lynx Nature Books. ISBN 978-84-16728-66-4.
- Nowak, Ronald M. (1999). Walker's Mammals of the World. Vol. 2 (6th ed.). Johns Hopkins University Press. ISBN 978-0-8018-5789-8.
- Musser, Guy G.; Carleton, Michael D. (2005). Wilson, Don E.; Reeder, DeeAnn M. (eds.). Mammal Species of the World. Vol. 2 (3rd ed.). Johns Hopkins University Press. ISBN 978-0-8018-8221-0.
