= List of mammals of Europe =

This is a list of mammals of Europe. It includes all mammals currently found in Europe (from northeast Atlantic to Ural Mountains and northern slope of Caucasus Mountains), whether resident or as regular migrants. Moreover, species occurring in Cyprus, Canary Islands (Spain) and Azores (Portugal) are listed here, despite the former being in Asia and the latter two being considered part of Africa, respectively. If geographical range of given European mammal additionally overlaps Turkey, it is noted in some of cases. This checklist does not include species found only in captivity. Each species is listed, with its binomial name and notes on its distribution where this is limited. Introduced species are also noted.

IUCN status abbreviations
| EX | Extinct | No reasonable doubt that the last individual has died |
| CR | Critically Endangered | In imminent risk of extinction in the wild |
| EN | Endangered | Facing an extremely high risk of extinction in the wild |
| VU | Vulnerable | Facing a high risk of extinction in the wild |
| NT | Near Threatened | Doesn't meet any criteria that would categorise it as risking extinction but likely to in the future |
| LC | Least Concern | No current identifiable risks to this species |
| DD | Data Deficient | Inadequate information to make an assessment of the risks to this species |

(v. 2025-1, the data is current as of May 29, 2025)

== Eulipotyphlans ==
=== Erinaceidae ===
Hedgehogs
- European hedgehog, Erinaceus europaeus NT
- Southern white-breasted hedgehog, Erinaceus concolor LC
- Northern white-breasted hedgehog, Erinaceus roumanicus LC
- Long-eared hedgehog, Hemiechinus auritus LC (eastern Europe)

=== Talpidae ===
Moles
- Aquitanian mole, Talpa aquitania LC (France, Spain)
- Mediterranean mole, Talpa caeca LC (south of the Alps)
- Caucasian mole, Talpa caucasica LC (Caucasus, Russia)
- European mole, Talpa europaea LC
- Levant mole, Talpa levantis LC (Bulgaria, Caucasus, Russia and European Turkey)
- Martino's mole, Talpa martinorum (Bulgaria)
- Spanish mole, Talpa occidentalis LC (Iberian Peninsula)
- Roman mole, Talpa romana LC (Italy and Greece)
- Balkan mole, Talpa stankovici LC (Balkans)
Desmans
- Russian desman, Desmana moschata CR (Russia, Ukraine)
- Pyrenean desman, Galemys pyrenaicus EN (Spain, Portugal, the Pyrenees)

=== Soricidae (shrews) ===
- Common shrew, Sorex araneus LC
- Crowned shrew, Sorex coronatus LC
- Iberian shrew, Sorex granarius LC
- Apennine shrew, Sorex samniticus LC
- Eurasian pygmy shrew, Sorex minutus LC
- Laxmann's shrew, Sorex caecutiens LC
- Eurasian least shrew, Sorex minutissimus LC
- Taiga shrew, Sorex isodon LC
- Alpine shrew, Sorex alpinus NT
- Valais shrew, Sorex antinorii LC (Italy, France, Switzerland) - formerly in Sorex araneus, and: (Note: Species split from this species or considered as distinct species alternatively. All these taxa occur in the area of interest, including the one on the left.)
  - Udine shrew, Sorex arunchi (Note: Not recognized as a separate species in the Mammal Diversity Database v. 1.10.) LC (Italy, Slovenia)
- Radde's shrew, Sorex raddei LC (Caucasus, Russia)
- Caucasian shrew, Sorex satunini LC (Caucasus, Russia)
- Caucasian pygmy shrew, Sorex volnuchini LC (Caucasus, Russia)
- Eurasian water shrew, Neomys fodiens LC
- Iberian water shrew, Neomys anomalus LC (Iberian Peninsula) and:

- Mediterranean water shrew, Neomys milleri LC

- Transcaucasian water shrew, Neomys teres LC (Caucasus, Russia)
- Etruscan shrew, Suncus etruscus LC
- Greater white-toothed shrew, Crocidura russula LC
- Lesser white-toothed shrew, Crocidura suaveolens LC
- Bicoloured shrew, Crocidura leucodon LC
- Gueldenstaedt's shrew, Crocidura gueldenstaedtii LC
- Sicilian shrew, Crocidura sicula LC (Sicily, Malta)
- North African white-toothed shrew, Crocidura pachyura LC (Mediterranean islands)
- Cretan shrew, Crocidura zimmermanni EN (Crete)
- Canarian shrew, Crocidura canariensis EN (Canary Islands in Africa - Spain)
- Piebald shrew, Diplomesodon pulchellus LC (Kazakhstan, Russia)

== Bats ==
=== Pteropodidae (megabat) ===
- Egyptian fruit bat, Rousettus aegyptiacus CR (Cyprus)

=== Rhinolophidae (horseshoe bats) ===
- Lesser horseshoe bat, Rhinolophus hipposideros LC
- Greater horseshoe bat, Rhinolophus ferrumequinum LC
- Mediterranean horseshoe bat, Rhinolophus euryale VU
- Blasius's horseshoe bat, Rhinolophus blasii VU
- Mehely's horseshoe bat, Rhinolophus mehelyi EN

=== Vespertilionidae (evening bats) ===
- Daubenton's bat, Myotis daubentonii LC
- Nathalina bat, Myotis (daubentonii) nathalinae (Myotis daubentonii: LC)
- Long-fingered bat, Myotis capaccinii VU
- Pond bat, Myotis dasycneme VU
- Brandt's bat, Myotis brandtii LC
- Whiskered bat, Myotis mystacinus LC
- David's myotis, Myotis davidii (south-eastern and eastern Europe) DD, includes i.e.:
  - Steppe whiskered bat, Myotis aurascens LC
- Alcathoe bat, Myotis alcathoe DD (Greece, Hungary)
- Geoffroy's bat, Myotis emarginatus LC
- Natterer's bat, Myotis nattereri LC and:
  - Cryptic myotis, Myotis crypticus NT
  - Tschuli myotis, Myotis tschuliensis (Eastern Europe)
  - Hovel's myotis, Myotis hoveli (Cyprus)
- Escalera's bat, Myotis escalerai NT (Spain, Portugal, France)
- Bechstein's bat, Myotis bechsteinii VU
- Greater mouse-eared bat, Myotis myotis LC
- Lesser mouse-eared bat, Myotis blythii VU
- Felten's myotis, Myotis punicus VU (Corsica, Sardinia, Malta)
- Common noctule, Nyctalus noctula LC
- Lesser noctule, Nyctalus leisleri LC
- Azores noctule, Nyctalus azoreum VU (the only mammal species endemic to North Atlantic Azores archipelago - Portugal)
- Greater noctule, Nyctalus lasiopterus VU
- Anatolian serotine, Eptesicus anatolicus DD (east Aegean Islands in Greece, Cyprus) - split from Botta's serotine, Eptesicus bottae LC
- Serotine, Eptesicus serotinus LC and:
  - Eptesicus lobatus LC (Ukraine)
- Meridional serotine, Eptesicus (serotinus) isabellinus LC
- Northern bat, Eptesicus nilssonii LC
- Parti-coloured bat, Vespertilio murinus LC
- Common pipistrelle, Pipistrellus pipistrellus LC
- Soprano pipistrelle, Pipistrellus pygmaeus LC
- Nathusius's pipistrelle, Pipistrellus nathusii LC
- Kuhl's pipistrelle, Pipistrellus kuhlii LC
- Savi's pipistrelle, Pipistrellus savii LC
- Crete pipistrelle, Pipistrellus creticus (Crete) - split from Hanak's pipistrelle, Pipistrellus hanaki EN
- Dusky pipistrelle, Pipistrellus hesperidus LC (Canary Islands in Africa - Spain) (Note: According to the IUCN Red List this distribution needs to be confirmed and bats from North Africa are treated as Pipistrellus kuhlii.)
- Madeira pipistrelle, Pipistrellus maderensis EN (Canary Islands and Madeira in Africa - Spain, Portugal)
- Common long-eared bat, Plecotus auritus LC
- Grey long-eared bat, Plecotus austriacus NT
- Kolombatovic's long-eared bat, Plecotus kolombatovici VU (Mediterranean)
- Alpine long-eared bat, Plecotus macrobullaris NT (mountains of southern Europe)
- Sardinian long-eared bat, Plecotus sardus CR (Sardinia)
- Canary long-eared bat, Plecotus teneriffae CR (Canary Islands in Africa - Spain) and:
  - Gaisler's long-eared bat, Plecotus gaisleri EN (Malta, Italy)
- Barbastelle, Barbastella barbastellus VU
- Caspian barbastelle, Barbastella caspica LC (Caucasus)

=== Miniopteridae ===
- Schreibers' bat, Miniopterus schreibersii VU and:
  - Pallid long-fingered bat, Miniopterus pallidus NT (Caucasus)

=== Molossidae (free-tailed bats) ===
- European free-tailed bat, Tadarida teniotis LC (southern Europe)

=== Nycteridae (slit-faced bats) ===
- Egyptian slit-faced bat, Nycteris thebaica LC (Greece)

== Lagomorphs ==
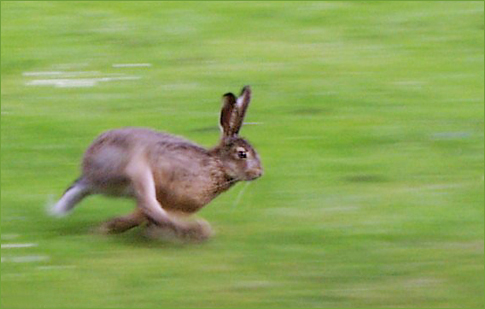
The European hare

=== Leporidae (leporids) ===
- European rabbit, Oryctolagus cuniculus NT
- European hare, Lepus europaeus LC
- Mountain hare, Lepus timidus LC
- Granada hare, Lepus granatensis LC (Spain, Portugal)
- Broom hare, Lepus castroviejoi VU (Cantabrian Mountains)
- Corsican hare, Lepus corsicanus VU (Corsica, southern Italy)
- Cape hare, Lepus capensis LC (Corsica, Cyprus in Asia - Greece, Turkey)
- Tolai hare, Lepus tolai LC (Kazakhstan)

=== Ochotonidae (pikas) ===
- Sardinian pika, Prolagus sardus EX (Corsica, Sardinia and adjacent Mediterranean islands)

== Rodents ==
=== Sciuridae (squirrels) ===
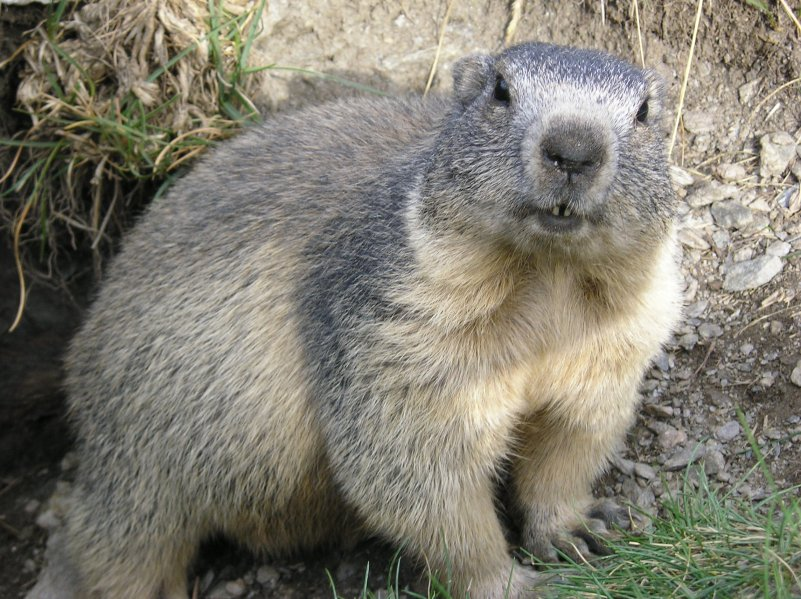
An alpine marmot

- Red squirrel, Sciurus vulgaris LC and:
  - Calabrian black squirrel, Sciurus meridionalis NT (Italy)
- Caucasian squirrel, Sciurus anomalus LC (eastern Europe)
- Siberian flying squirrel, Pteromys volans NT (Finland, Estonia, Russia)
- European souslik, Spermophilus citellus EN (north-eastern Europe)
- Yellow ground squirrel, Spermophilus fulvus LC (eastern Europe)
- Little ground squirrel, Spermophilus pygmaeus CR (eastern Europe)
- Spotted souslik, Spermophilus suslicus CR (south-eastern Europe)
- Russet ground squirrel, Spermophilus major VU (Russia, Kazakhstan)
- Caucasian Mountain ground squirrel, Spermophilus musicus LC (Caucasus)
- Alpine marmot, Marmota marmota LC (Alps, Tatras, Carpathians, Pyrenees and Balkans)
- Tatra marmot, Marmota marmota latirostris LC (Tatra Mountains)
- Bobak marmot, Marmota bobak LC (eastern Europe)

=== Castoridae ===
- European beaver, Castor fiber LC

=== Hystricidae (Old World porcupines) ===
- Indian porcupine, Hystrix indica LC (European Azerbaijan and Georgia)

=== Gliridae (dormice) ===
- Garden dormouse, Eliomys quercinus VU
- Forest dormouse, Dryomys nitedula LC (eastern Europe)
- European edible dormouse, Glis glis LC
- Hazel dormouse, Muscardinus avellanarius LC
- Roach's mouse-tailed dormouse, Myomimus roachi EN (Greece, European Turkey and Bulgaria)

=== Muroids: Spalacidae (spalacids) ===
- Greater mole rat, Spalax microphthalmus LC (eastern Europe)
- Lesser mole rat, Spalax leucodon LC (eastern Europe)
- Podolsk mole rat, Spalax zemni EN (eastern Europe)
- Sandy mole-rat, Spalax arenarius EN (eastern Europe)
- Balkan mole rat, Spalax graecus VU and:
  - Mehely's blind mole-rat, Spalax antiquus EN (Romania)
  - Oltenia blind mole-rat, Spalax istricus CR (Romania)
- Nehring's blind mole rat, Spalax nehringi LC (may occur in Greece)
- Giant blind mole-rat, Spalax giganteus LC (Russia)

=== Muroids: Cricetidae ===
Hamsters
- Common hamster, Cricetus cricetus CR (eastern and central Europe)
- Gray dwarf hamster, Nothocricetulus migratorius NT (Balkans)
- Romanian hamster, Mesocricetus newtoni VU (shores of the Black Sea)
- Ciscaucasian hamster, Mesocricetus raddei LC (Russia)
- Brandt's hamster, Mesocricetus brandti NT (Caucasus)
- Eversmann's hamster, Allocricetulus eversmanni LC (Russia, Kazakhstan)
Lemmings
- Wood lemming, Myopus schisticolor LC (Scandinavia)
- Norway lemming, Lemmus lemmus LC (northern Europe)
- Siberian brown lemming, Lemmus sibiricus LC (Russia)
- Arctic lemming, Dicrostonyx torquatus LC (Svalbard as migrant)
Voles
- Bank vole, Myodes glareolus LC
- Northern red-backed vole, Myodes rutilus LC
- Grey red-backed vole, Myodes rufocanus LC
- Martino's Dinaric vole, Dinaromys bogdanovi VU (Balkans) and:
  - Western Dinaric vole, Dinaromys longipedis (Balkans)
- European water vole, Arvicola amphibius LC and:
  - Italian water vole, Arvicola italicus NT (Italy, Switzerland)
  - Montane water vole, Arvicola monticola, A. scherman
- Southwestern water vole, Arvicola sapidus NT (Spain and France)
- Root vole, Alexandromys oeconomus LC
- Middendorff's vole, Alexandromys middendorffii NA (Russia)
- Short-tailed field vole, Microtus agrestis LC and:
  - Mediterranean field vole, Microtus lavernedii
  - Portuguese field vole, Microtus rozianus (Iberian Peninsula)
- Pyrenean pine vole, Microtus pyrenaicus (France, Spain)
- Common vole, Microtus arvalis LC and:
  - Altai vole, Microtus obscurus LC (eastern Europe)
- Sibling vole, Microtus epiroticus (M. levis: LC)
- Snow vole, Microtus nivalis LC
- Gunther's vole, Microtus guentheri LC and:
  - Harting's vole, Microtus hartingi (Balkans)
- Cabrera's vole, Microtus cabrerae NT
- European pine vole, Microtus subterraneus LC
- East European gray vole, Microtus rossiaemeridionalis LC
- Social vole, Microtus socialis LC
- Felten's vole, Microtus felteni LC
- Gerbe's vole, Microtus gerbei LC
- Savi's pine vole, Microtus savii LC and:
  - Sicilian pine vole, Microtus nebrodensis (Italy)
  - Calabria pine vole, Microtus brachycercus (Italy) LC
- Alpine pine vole, Microtus multiplex LC
- Tatra pine vole, Microtus tatricus LC
- Liechtenstein's pine vole, Microtus liechtensteini LC and:
  - Bavarian pine vole, Microtus bavaricus CR
- Mediterranean pine vole, Microtus duodecimcostatus LC
- Lusitanian pine vole, Microtus lusitanicus LC
- Thomas's pine vole, Microtus thomasi LC
- Major's pine vole, Microtus majori LC
- Caucasian pine vole, Microtus daghestanicus LC (Caucasus)
- Narrow-headed vole, Lasiopodomys gregalis LC (Russia)
- Gudaur snow vole, Chionomys gud LC (Caucasus)
- Robert's snow vole, Chionomys roberti LC (Caucasus)
- Steppe lemming, Lagurus lagurus EN
- Northern mole vole, Ellobius talpinus VU
- Long-clawed mole vole, Prometheomys schaposchnikowi VU (Caucasus)

=== Muroids: Muridae ===
Old World rats and mice
- Wood mouse, Apodemus sylvaticus LC
- Steppe field mouse, Apodemus witherbyi NA (eastern Europe)
- Yellow-necked mouse, Apodemus flavicollis LC and:
  - Black Sea field mouse, Apodemus ponticus LC (Caucasus)
- Alpine field mouse, Apodemus alpicola LC (Alps)
- Pygmy field mouse, Apodemus uralensis LC (eastern Europe)
- Broad-toothed field mouse, Apodemus mystacinus LC (south-eastern Europe)
- Western broad-toothed field mouse, Apodemus epimelas LC (Balkans)
- Striped field mouse, Apodemus agrarius LC (eastern Europe)
- Eurasian harvest mouse, Micromys minutus LC
- House mouse, Mus musculus LC
- Algerian mouse, Mus spretus LC (France, Spain and Portugal)
- Steppe mouse, Mus spicilegus LC (south-eastern Europe)
- Cypriot mouse, Mus cypriacus LC (Cyprus)
- Macedonian mouse, Mus macedonicus LC (south Balcans)
Spiny mice
- Cretan spiny mouse, Acomys minous DD (Crete)
- Cyprus Spiny Mouse, Acomys nesiotes DD (Cyprus)
Jirds
- Tristram's jird, Meriones tristrami NA (Greek island of Kos)
- Tamarisk jird, Meriones tamariscinus LC (eastern Europe)
- Midday jird, Meriones meridianus LC (eastern Europe)
Gerbils
- Great gerbil, Rhombomys opimus LC (Kazakhstan)

=== Muroids: Sminthidae (birch mice) ===
- Northern birch mouse, Sicista betulina LC (Scandinavia and north-eastern Europe)
- Southern birch mouse, Sicista subtilis LC (south-eastern Europe) and:

- Hungarian birch mouse, Sicista (subtilis) trizona EN (Hungary)
- Nordmann's birch mouse, Sicista loriger CR (eastern Europe)

- Strand's birch mouse, Sicista strandi LC (eastern Europe)
- Severtzov's birch mouse, Sicista severtzovi CR (eastern Europe) and:
  - Tsimlyansk birch mouse, Sicista cimlanica NT
- Caucasian birch mouse, Sicista caucasica NT (Caucasus)
- Kazbeg birch mouse, Sicista kazbegica EN (Caucasus)
- Kluchor birch mouse, Sicista kluchorica LC (Caucasus)

=== Muroids: Dipodidae (jerboas) ===
- Dwarf fat-tailed jerboa, Pygeretmus pumilio LC (eastern Europe)
- Great jerboa, Allactaga major NT (eastern Europe)
- Small five-toed jerboa, Allactaga elater LC (eastern Europe)
- Northern three-toed jerboa, Dipus sagitta NA (eastern Europe)
- Thick-tailed three-toed jerboa, Stylodipus telum EN (eastern Europe)
- Williams's jerboa, Scarturus williamsi NT (Azerbaijan)

== Carnivorans ==
=== Ursidae (bears) ===
- Brown bear, Ursus arctos LC
- Polar bear, Ursus maritimus VU (Svalbard, Arctic European Russia; migrant to Iceland)

=== Canidae ===
European jackal (Canis aureus moreotica), a subspecies of golden jackal

- Golden jackal, Canis aureus LC (Russia and south-eastern Europe)
- Grey wolf, Canis lupus LC (Spain, Italy, France, Germany, Scandinavia and eastern Europe)
- Corsac fox, Vulpes corsac LC (Along southern Volga and European Kazakhstan)
- Arctic fox, Vulpes lagopus LC (Scandinavia and Iceland)
- Red fox, Vulpes vulpes LC

=== Mustelidae (weasels and allies) ===
- Wolverine, Gulo gulo LC (Scandinavia)
- European otter, Lutra lutra NT
- Beech marten, Martes foina LC (southern Europe)
- European pine marten, Martes martes LC
- Sable, Martes zibellina NA (western Ural Mountains, European Russia)
- Asian badger, Meles leucurus LC (Russia, Kazakhstan)
- European badger, Meles meles LC and:
  - Caucasian badger, Meles canescens (Crete, Rhodes)
- Stoat, Mustela erminea LC
- Steppe polecat, Mustela eversmanii EN
- European mink, Mustela lutreola CR (eastern Europe, Spain, France)
- European polecat, Mustela putorius LC
- Least weasel, Mustela nivalis LC
- Marbled polecat, Vormela peregusna VU (southeastern Europe)

=== Felidae (cats) ===
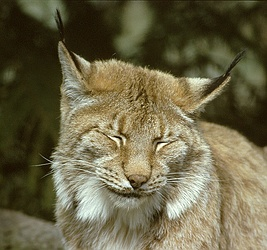
The Eurasian lynx

- Asiatic cheetah, Acinonyx jubatus venaticus CR (A. jubatus: VU) (extirpated) (Caucasus)
- Swamp cat, Felis chaus NA (Cis-Caspian region)
- African wildcat, Felis lybica LC (France, Italy, Greece)
- European wildcat, Felis silvestris LC
- Pallas's cat, Otocolobus manul LC (eastern Caucasus, possibly extirpated)
- Eurasian lynx, Lynx lynx LC
- Iberian lynx, Lynx pardinus VU (Spain and Portugal)
- Lion Panthera leo VU (extirpated) (Caucasus and southeastern Europe)
- Persian leopard, Panthera pardus tulliana EN (P. pardus: VU) (Dagestan, Northern Caucasus, European Russia)
- Caspian tiger, Panthera tigris tigris EX (P. tigris EN) (Ukraine, Southern Russia and Caucasus)

=== Hyaenidae (hyenas) ===
- Striped hyena, Hyaena hyaena NT (eastern Caucasus)

=== Phocidae (earless seals) ===
- Hooded seal, Cystophora cristata VU (Northern Scandinavia)
- Bearded seal, Erignathus barbatus NT (Northern Scandinavia)
- Grey seal, Halichoerus grypus LC (Norway, Baltics, Great Britain and Ireland)
- Mediterranean monk seal, Monachus monachus VU (Mediterranean)
- Harp seal, Pagophilus groenlandicus NT (Northern Scandinavia)
- Common seal, Phoca vitulina LC
- Ringed seal, Pusa hispida VU (Northern Scandinavia)
- Saimaa ringed seal, Pusa saimensis EN (Lake Saimaa, Finland)

=== Odobenidae ===
- Walrus, Odobenus rosmarus NT (Svalbard, Iceland and as migrant further south)

== Odd-toed ungulates ==
=== Equidae (horse) ===
- Tarpan, Equus ferus ferus EX (E. ferus EN)
- Przewalski's horse, Equus ferus przewalskii EN (E. ferus EN) (Belarus, Ukraine)
- Turkmenian kulan, Equus hemionus kulan EN (E. hemionus NT) (Ukraine)

== Even-toed ungulates ==
=== Suidae (pigs) ===
- Wild boar, Sus scrofa LC

=== Bovidae (bovid) ===
- European bison, Bison bonasus NT (reintroduced)
- Aurochs, Bos primigenius EX
- Wild goat, Capra aegagrus NT (Caucasus)
- West Caucasian tur, Capra caucasica EN (Caucasus)
- East Caucasian tur, Capra cylindricornis NT (Caucasus)
- Alpine ibex, Capra ibex LC (France, Italy, Switzerland, and Germany)
- Iberian ibex, Capra pyrenaica LC (Spain and Portugal)
- Goitered gazelle, Gazella subgutturosa VU (European Azerbaijan)
- Muskox, Ovibos moschatus LC (Norway, Russia; reintroduced)
- Mouflon, Ovis gmelini EN (Cyprus and Caucasus)
- Pyrenean chamois, Rupicapra pyrenaica LC
- Chamois, Rupicapra rupicapra LC
- Saiga antelope, Saiga tatarica NT (European Russia and Kazakhstan)

=== Cervidae (deer) ===
- Elk, Alces alces LC
- Roe deer, Capreolus capreolus LC
- Red deer, Cervus elaphus LC
- European fallow deer, Dama dama LC
- Reindeer, Rangifer tarandus LC (Scandinavia)

== Cetacea ==
=== Delphinidae (oceanic dolphins) ===
Killer whale

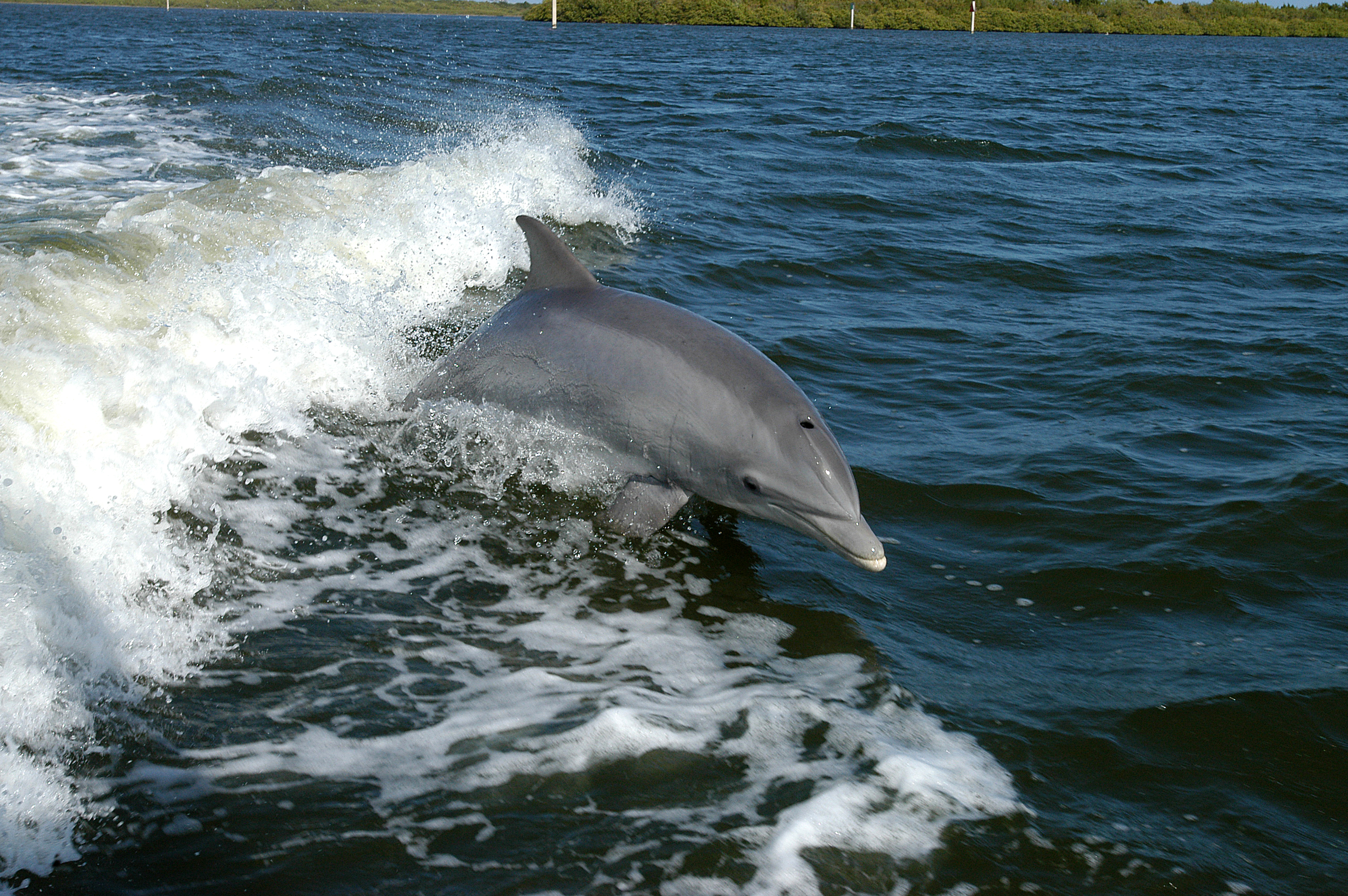
Bottlenose dolphin

- White-beaked dolphin, Lagenorhynchus albirostris LC
- Atlantic white-sided dolphin, Lagenorhynchus acutus LC
- Rough-toothed dolphin, Steno bredanensis LC
- Striped dolphin, Stenella coeruleoalba LC
- Atlantic spotted dolphin, Stenella frontalis LC
- Short-beaked common dolphin, Delphinus delphis LC
  (Mediterranean subpopulation: EN, ssp. ponticus: VU)
- Bottle-nosed dolphin, Tursiops truncatus LC
  (Mediterranean subpopulation: VU, ssp. ponticus: EN)
- Fraser's dolphin, Lagenodelphis hosei NA (Canary Islands in Africa)
- False killer whale, Pseudorca crassidens DD
- Killer whale, Orcinus orca DD
- Risso's dolphin, Grampus griseus LC (Mediterranean subpopulation: DD)
- Long-finned pilot whale, Globicephala melas LC (Mediterranean subpopulation: DD)
- Short-finned pilot whale, Globicephala macrorhynchus LC
- Pygmy killer whale, Feresa attenuata NA

=== Phocoenidae (porpoises) ===
- Common porpoise, Phocoena phocoena LC
  (Baltic Sea subpopulation: EN, ssp. relicta - Black Sea harbour porpoise: EN)

=== Monodontidae ===
- White whale, Delphinapterus leucas VU (Arctic Ocean)
- Narwhal, Monodon monoceros VU (Arctic Ocean)

=== Kogiidae ===
- Pygmy sperm whale, Kogia breviceps DD
- Dwarf sperm whale, Kogia sima DD

=== Physeteridae ===
- Sperm whale, Physeter macrocephalus VU (Mediterranean subpopulation: EN)

=== Ziphiidae (beaked whales) ===
- Gervais' beaked whale, Mesoplodon europaeus LC
- Blainville's beaked whale, Mesoplodon densirostris LC
- True's beaked whale, Mesoplodon mirus LC
- Sowerby's beaked whale, Mesoplodon bidens LC
- Grays beaked whale, Mesoplodon grayi NA
- Northern bottlenose whale, Hyperoodon ampullatus LC
- Cuvier's beaked whale, Ziphius cavirostris LC (Mediterranean subpopulation: DD)

=== Balaenopteridae (rorquals) ===
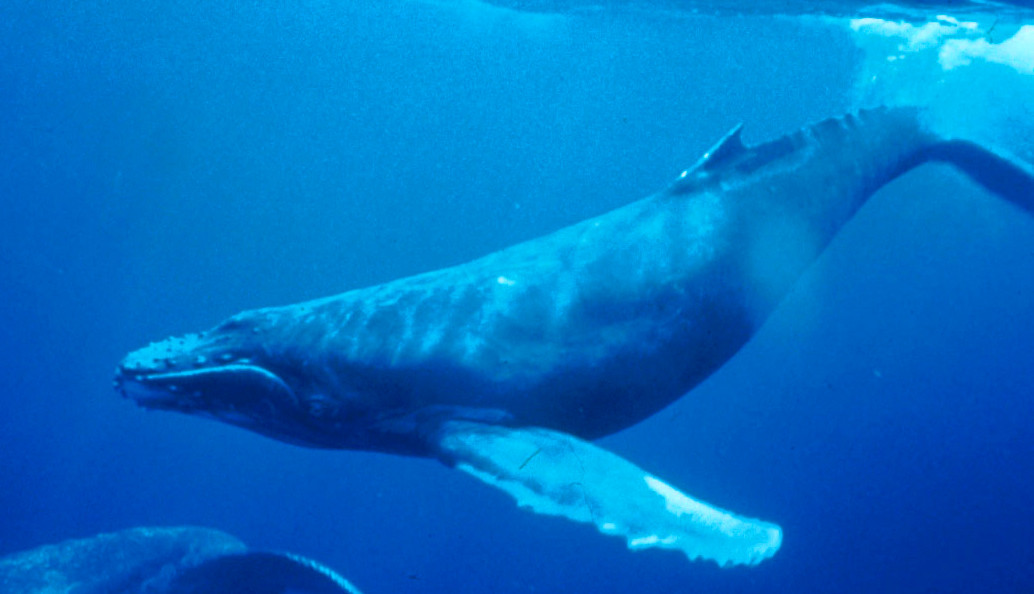
Humpback whale

- Blue whale, Balaenoptera musculus NT (ssp. musculus North Atlantic stock: CR)
- Fin whale, Balaenoptera physalus LC (Mediterranean subpopulation: EN)
- Sei whale, Balaenoptera borealis LC
- Common minke whale, Balaenoptera acutorostrata LC
- Bryde's whale, Balaenoptera edeni VU (Canary Islands in Africa)
- Humpback whale, Megaptera novaeangliae LC

=== Eschrichtiidae ===
- Gray whale, Eschrichtius robustus RE (possible vagrant from Pacific was recorded in 2010)

=== Balaenidae ===
- Bowhead whale, Balaena mysticetus VU
  (Svalbard-Barents Sea (Spitsbergen) subpopulation: CR)
- North Atlantic right whale, Eubalaena glacialis CR

== Introduced animals ==
=== Macropodidae (macropods) ===
- Red-necked wallaby, Notamacropus rufogriseus LC (Britain, Ireland, France and Germany, introduced)

=== Erinaceidae ===
- North African hedgehog, Atelerix algirus LC (France and Spain, probably introduced)

=== Primates ===
- Barbary macaque, Macaca sylvanus EN (Gibraltar, introduced)

=== Sciuridae (squirrels) ===
- Grey squirrel, Sciurus carolinensis LC (Britain, introduced)
- Barbary ground squirrel, Atlantoxerus getulus LC (Canary Islands in Africa - Spain, introduced)
- Siberian chipmunk, Tamias sibiricus LC (introduced)

=== Myocastoridae ===
- Coypu, Myocastor coypus LC (introduced)

=== Cricetidae ===
- Muskrat, Ondatra zibethicus LC (introduced)

=== Hystricidae (Old World porcupines) ===
- Crested porcupine, Hystrix cristata LC (Italy, disputed, possibly native)

=== Muroids: Muridae ===
Old World rats and mice
- Brown rat, Rattus norvegicus LC (introduced)
- Black rat, Rattus rattus LC (introduced)

=== Canidae ===
- Raccoon dog, Nyctereutes procyonoides LC (introduced)

=== Mustelidae (weasel) ===
- American mink, Neogale vison LC (introduced)

=== Herpestidae (mongooses) ===
- Egyptian mongoose, Herpestes ichneumon LC (Spain and Portugal, disputed, possibly native)

=== Viverridae (viverrids) ===
- Common genet, Genetta genetta LC (France, Spain, Italy, Portugal, introduced)

=== Procyonidae ===
- South American coati, Nasua nasua LC (Great Britain, Mallorca, introduced)
- Common raccoon, Procyon lotor LC (introduced)

=== Bovidae (bovids) ===
- Barbary sheep, Ammotragus lervia VU (Spain and Portugal, introduced)

=== Equidae (horses) ===
  - Przewalski's horse, Equus ferus przewalskii EN (E. ferus EN) (introduced; Ukraine, Belarus)

=== Cervidae (deer) ===
- Chital, Axis axis LC (Croatia, introduced)
- Sika deer, Cervus nippon LC (introduced)
- Chinese water deer, Hydropotes inermis VU (Britain, introduced)
- Chinese muntjac, Muntiacus reevesi LC (Britain, Ireland, Japan, the Netherlands, Belgium, introduced)
- White-tailed deer, Odocoileus virginianus LC (introduced; Finland, Czechia)

== See also ==
- List of amphibians of Europe
- List of birds of Europe
- List of reptiles of Europe
- List of mammal genera
- Lists of mammals by region
- List of extinct animals of Europe
