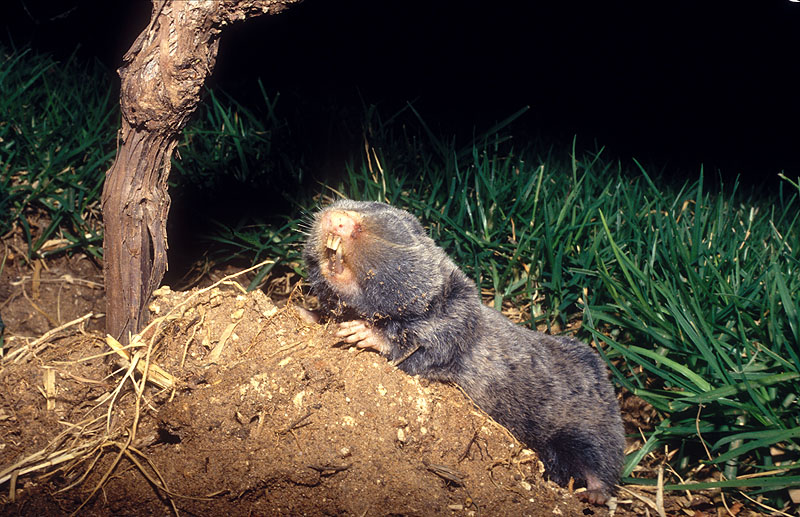
- Middle East blind mole-rat (Nannospalax ehrenbergi)

Scientific classification
- Kingdom: Animalia
- Phylum: Chordata
- Class: Mammalia
- Order: Rodentia
- Family: Spalacidae
- Subfamily: Spalacinae; Gray, 1821

Genera
- Spalax; Nannospalax

= Blind mole-rat =

Blind mole-rat Temporal range: Early Miocene–Recent

Subfamily of rodents

The blind mole-rats, also known as the fossorial or subterranean mole rats, are a subfamily (Spalacinae) of rodents in the family Spalacidae, found in eastern Europe and western and central Asia. The hystricognath mole-rats of the family Bathyergidae are completely unrelated, but some other forms are also in the family Spalacidae. Zokors (subfamily Myospalacinae), root rats, and bamboo rats (subfamily Rhizomyinae) are spalacids also sometimes referred to as mole rats.

Blind mole-rats are in the family Spalacidae, but are unique enough to be given a separate subfamily, Spalacinae. Alternate opinions on taxonomy consider the blind mole-rats to be the only members of the family Spalacidae and rank other spalacid subfamilies as full families. Other authors group all members of the superfamily Muroidea into a single family, Muridae. The Spalacinae contains two genera and eight species. Some authorities treat all species as belonging to a single genus, Spalax, but more recent studies indicate a deep divergence between both lineages dating back to the Late Miocene, supporting them as being distinct genera.

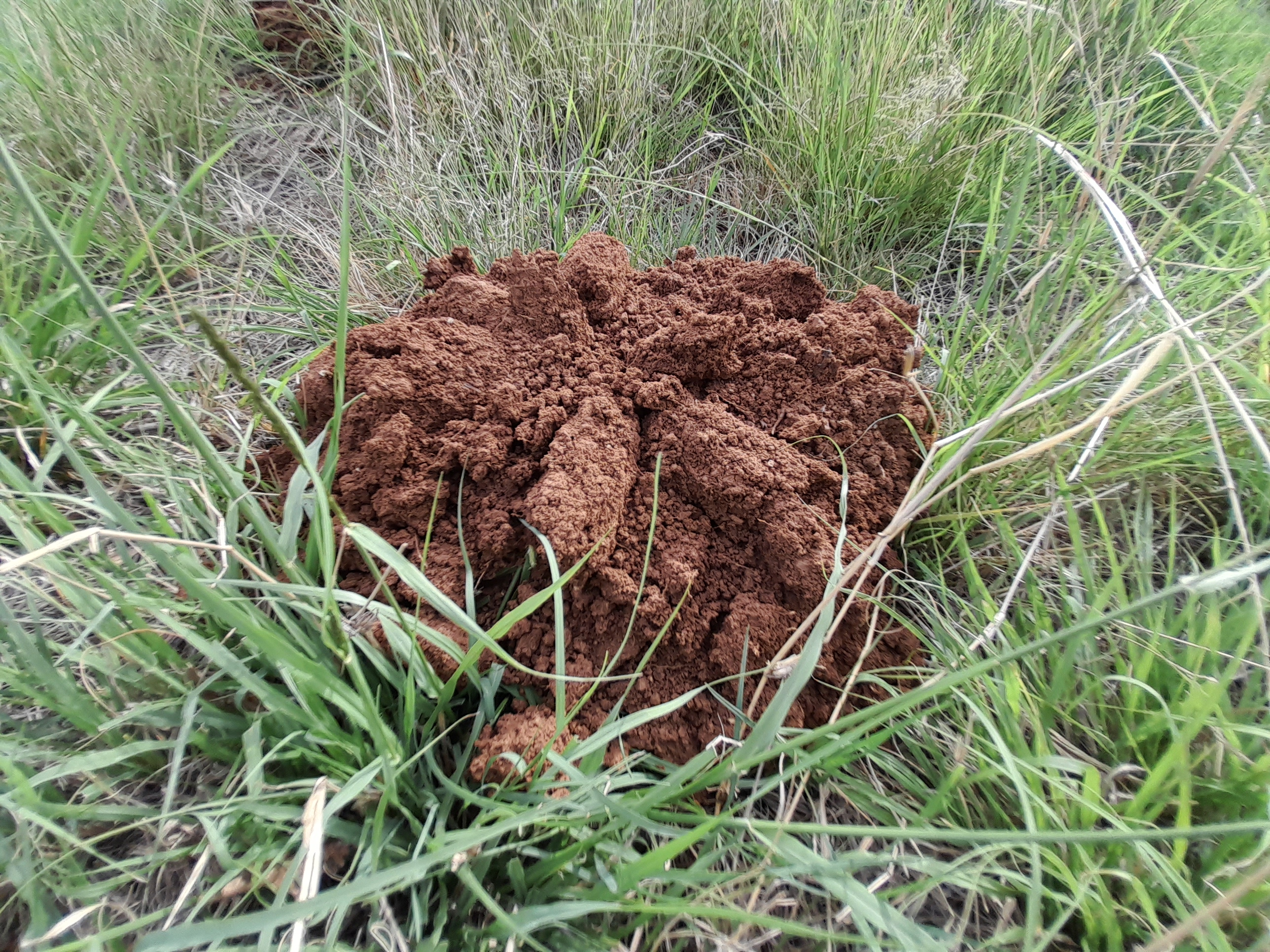
Blind mole-rat diggings

Spalacinae mole-rats are truly blind. Their very small eyes are completely covered by a layer of skin. Unlike many other fossorial rodents, blind mole-rats do not have enlarged front claws and do not appear to use their forearms as a primary digging tool. Digging is almost exclusively conducted using their powerful front teeth, which are separated from the rest of the mouth by a flap of skin. When a blind mole-rat closes its mouth, its incisors are still on the outside. Blind mole-rats may have evolved from spalacids that used their front limbs to dig, because their olecranon processes are large relative to the rest of their arms. The olecranon process is a part of the ulna bone where muscles attach, and digging animals tend to have enlarged olecranon processes to provide a large surface for their large and powerful muscles to attach.

Because they are completely blind, blind mole-rats have been important laboratory animals in tests on how eyes and eye proteins function. Although blind mole-rats have only atrophied subcutaneous eyes and are sightless, their circadian rhythm is kept. A few publications, such as Avivi et al., 2002, have proven that the circadian genes that control the biological clock are expressed in a similar manner as in sighted, above-ground mammals.

== Classification ==
- Subfamily Spalacinae - blind mole-rats
  - Genus Spalax
    - Mehely's blind mole-rat, S. antiquus
    - Sandy blind mole-rat, S. arenarius
    - Giant blind mole-rat, S. giganteus
    - Bukovina blind mole-rat, S. graecus
    - Oltenia blind mole-rat, S. istricus (possibly extinct)
    - Greater blind mole-rat, S. microphthalmus
    - Kazakhstan blind mole-rat, S. uralensis
    - Podolsk blind mole-rat, S. zemni
  - Genus Nannospalax - small-bodied mole-rats
    - Subgenus Nannospalax
      - Middle East blind mole-rat or Palestine mole-rat, N. ehrenbergi
    - Subgenus Mesospalax
      - Lesser blind mole-rat, N. leucodon
      - Anatolian blind mole-rat or Nehring's blind mole-rat, N. xanthodon
