= List of mammals of Romania =

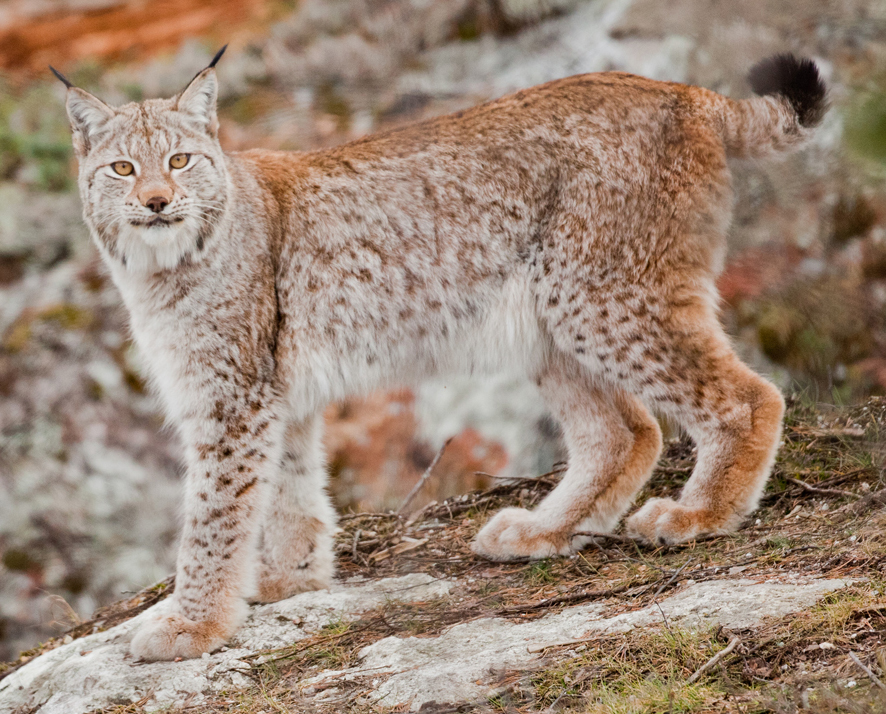
The Eurasian lynx is the national animal of Romania.

There are ninety mammal species in Romania, of which one is critically endangered, one is endangered, fourteen are vulnerable, and four are near threatened.

Icons which state each species' global IUCN status:
EX	Extinct	No reasonable doubt that the last individual has died
CR	Critically Endangered	In imminent risk of extinction in the wild
EN	Endangered	Facing an extremely high risk of extinction in the wild
VU	Vulnerable	Facing a high risk of extinction in the wild
NT	Near Threatened	Doesn't meet any criteria that would categorise it as risking extinction but likely to in the future
LC	Least Concern	No current identifiable risks to this species

== Order: Rodentia (rodents) ==
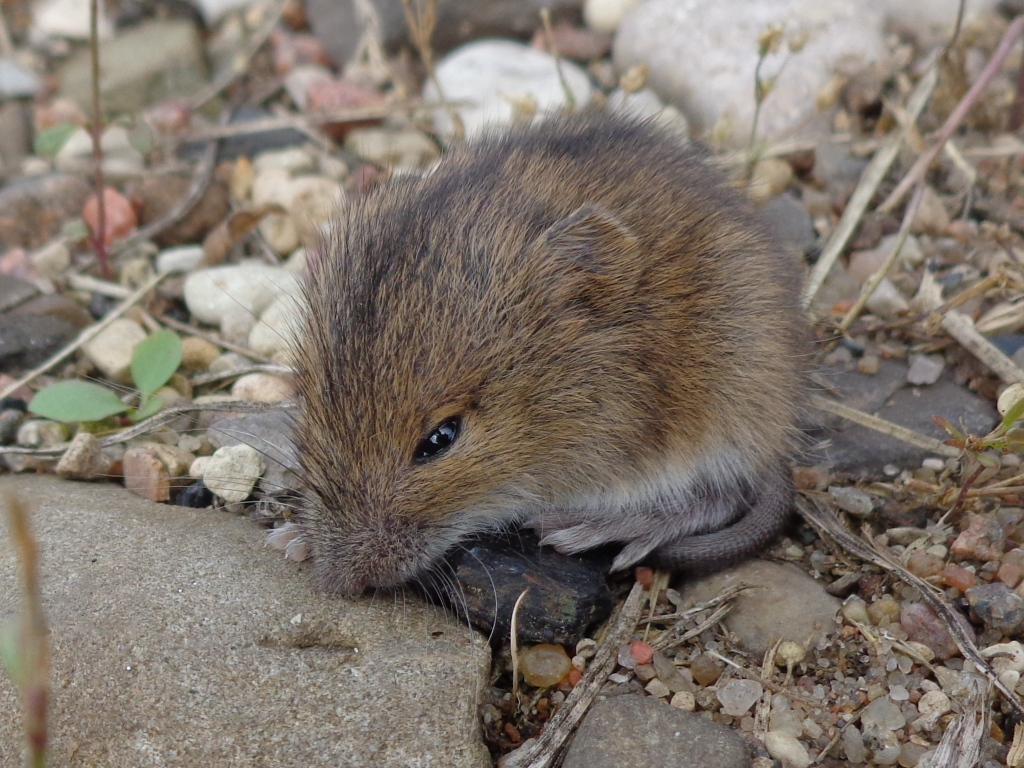
Northern birch mouse

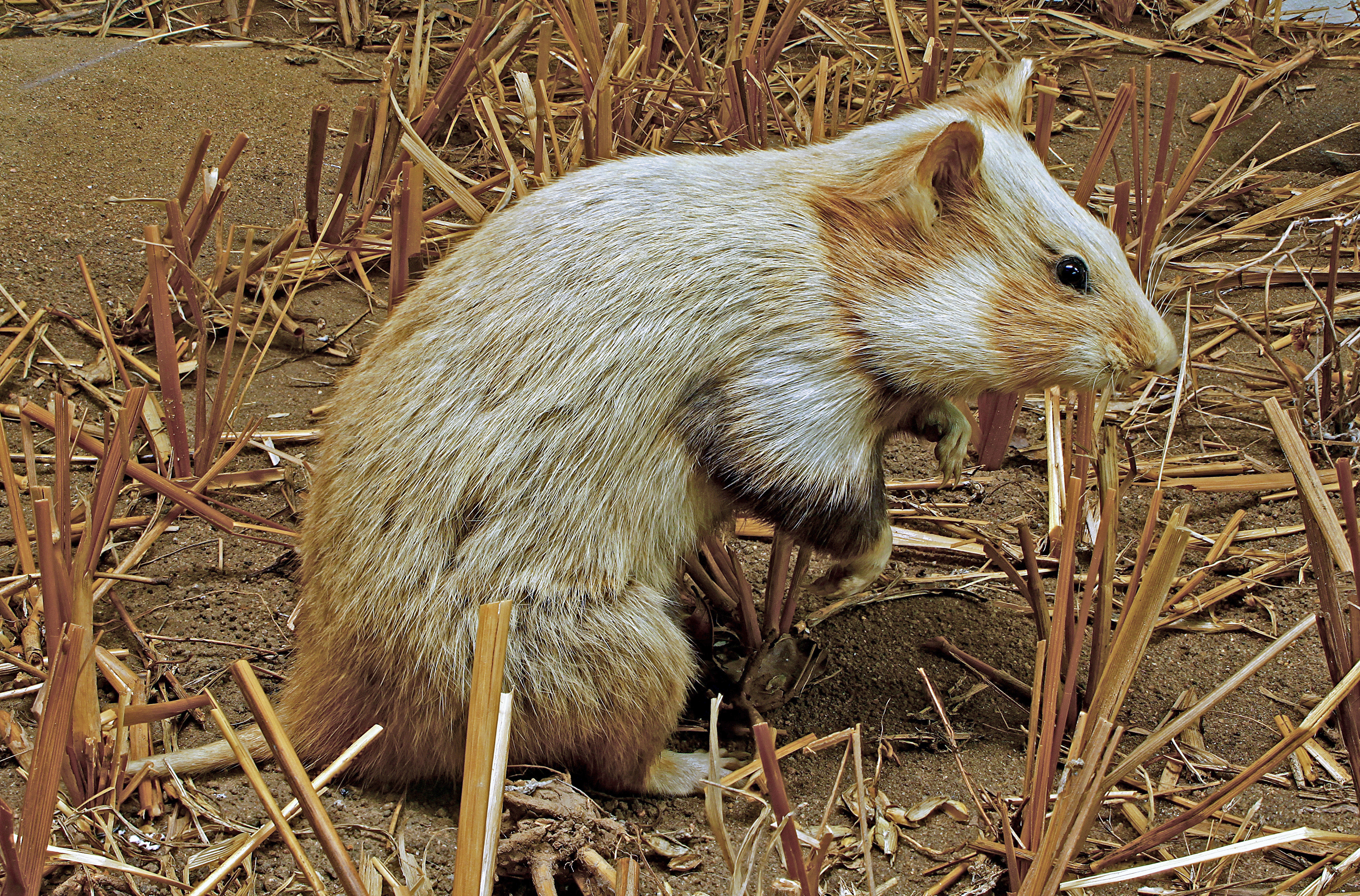
European hamster

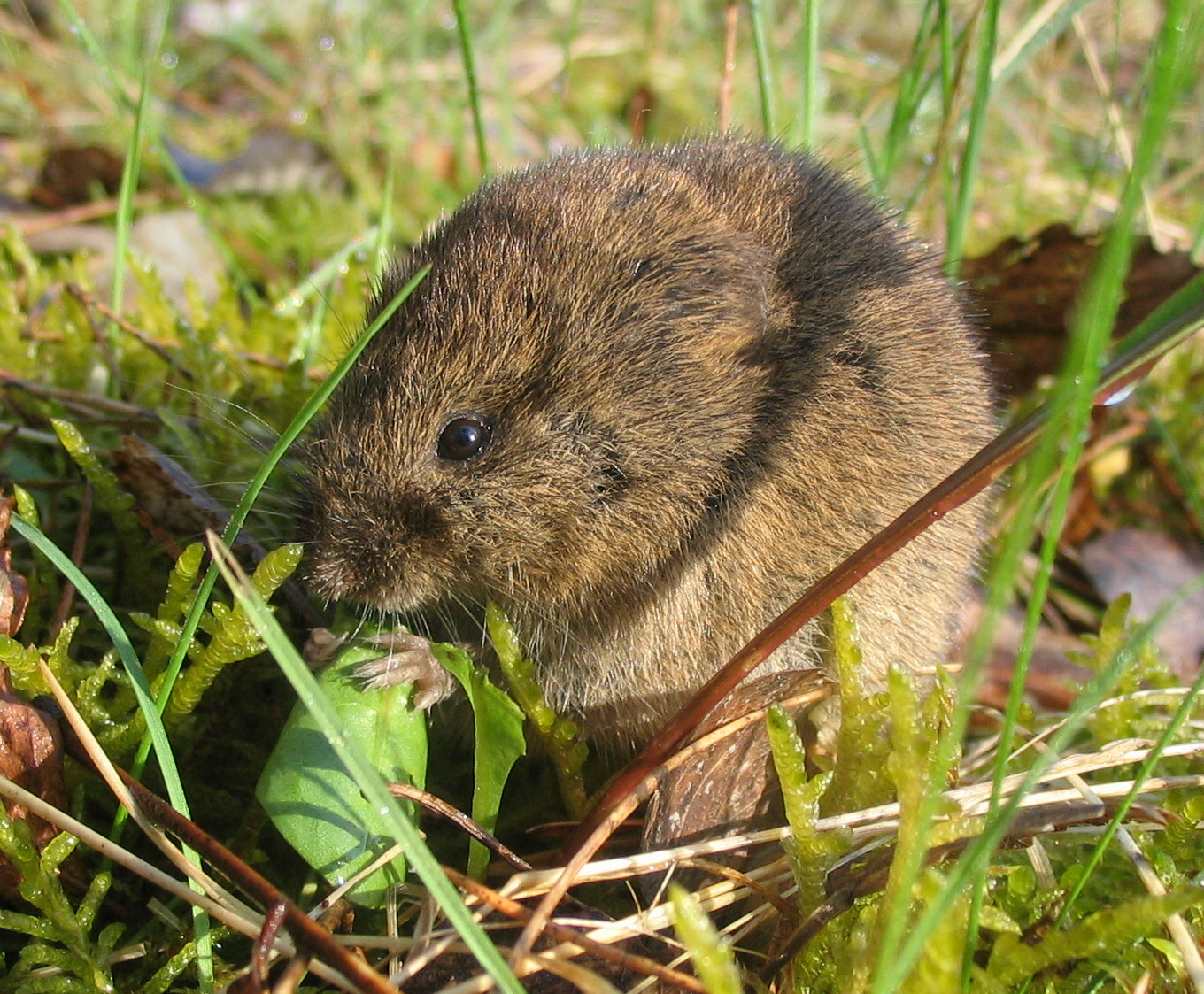
Common vole

Rodents make up the largest order of mammals, with over 40% of mammalian species. They have two incisors in the upper and lower jaw which grow continually and must be kept short by gnawing. Most rodents are small though the capybara can weigh up to 45 kg (99 lb).

- Suborder: Sciurognathi
  - Family: Sciuridae (squirrels)
    - Subfamily: Sciurinae
      - Tribe: Sciurini
        - Genus: Sciurus
          - Red squirrel, S. vulgaris LC
    - Subfamily: Xerinae
      - Tribe: Marmotini
        - Genus: Marmota
          - Alpine marmot, M. marmota LC reintroduced
        - Genus: Spermophilus
          - European ground squirrel, Spermophilus citellus VU
          - Speckled ground squirrel, Spermophilus suslicus VU
  - Family: Gliridae (dormice)
    - Subfamily: Leithiinae
      - Genus: Dryomys
        - Forest dormouse, D. nitedula
      - Genus: Eliomys
        - Garden dormouse, E. quercinus NT
      - Genus: Muscardinus
        - Hazel dormouse, Muscardinus avellanarius NT
    - Subfamily: Glirinae
      - Genus: Glis
        - European edible dormouse, Glis glis NT
  - Family: Dipodidae (jerboas)
    - Subfamily: Sicistinae
      - Genus: Sicista
        - Northern birch mouse, Sicista betulina NT
        - Southern birch mouse, Sicista subtilis NT
  - Family: Spalacidae
    - Subfamily: Spalacinae
      - Genus: Spalax
        - Bukovin mole rat, Spalax graecus VU
      - Genus: Nannospalax
        - Lesser mole rat, Nannospalax leucodon VU
  - Family: Cricetidae
    - Subfamily: Cricetinae
      - Genus: Cricetulus
        - Grey dwarf hamster, Cricetulus migratorius NT
      - Genus: Cricetus
        - European hamster, Cricetus cricetus LC
      - Genus: Mesocricetus
        - Romanian hamster, Mesocricetus newtoni VU
    - Subfamily: Arvicolinae
      - Genus: Arvicola
        - European water vole, A. amphibius LC
      - Genus: Chionomys
        - Snow vole, Chionomys nivalis
      - Genus: Clethrionomys
        - Bank vole, Clethrionomys glareolus
      - Genus: Microtus
        - Field vole, Microtus agrestis
        - Common vole, Microtus arvalis
        - Southern vole, Microtus rossiaemeridionalis
        - European pine vole, Microtus subterraneus
        - Tatra vole, Microtus tatricus
  - Family: Muridae (mice, rats, voles, gerbils, hamsters)
    - Subfamily: Murinae
      - Genus: Apodemus
        - Striped field mouse, Apodemus agrarius
        - Yellow-necked mouse, Apodemus flavicollis
        - Wood mouse, Apodemus sylvaticus LC
        - Ural field mouse, Apodemus uralensis
      - Genus: Micromys
        - Eurasian harvest mouse, Micromys minutus NT
      - Genus: Mus
        - Steppe mouse, Mus spicilegus NT

== Order: Lagomorpha (lagomorphs) ==
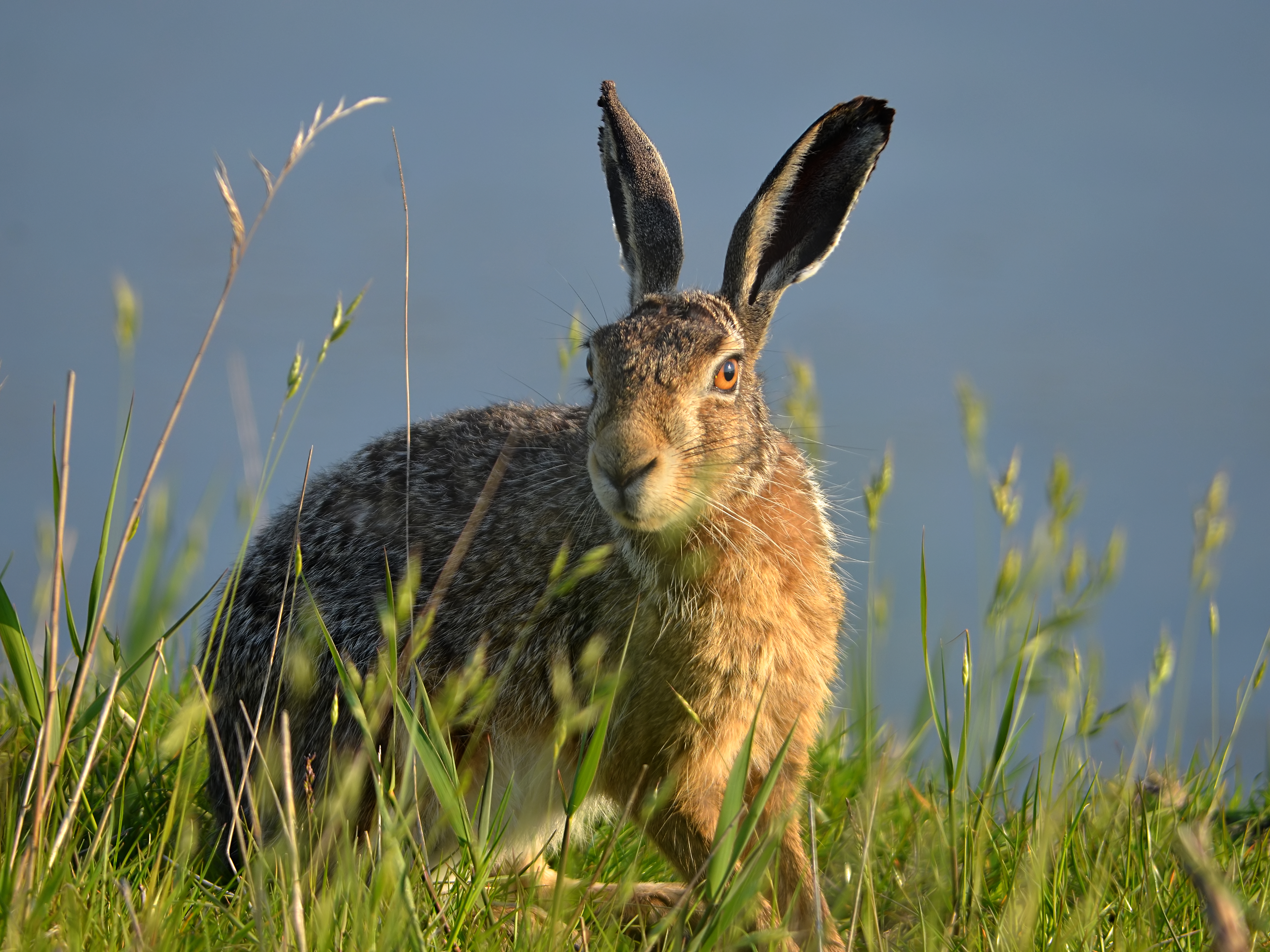
European hare

The lagomorphs comprise two families, Leporidae (hares and rabbits), and Ochotonidae (pikas). Though they can resemble rodents, and were classified as a superfamily in that order until the early twentieth century, they have since been considered a separate order. They differ from rodents in a number of physical characteristics, such as having four incisors in the upper jaw rather than two.

- Family: Leporidae (rabbits, hares)
  - Genus: Lepus
    - European hare, L. europaeus LC
  - Genus: Oryctolagus
    - European rabbit, O. cuniculus EN introduced

== Order: Erinaceomorpha (hedgehogs and gymnures) ==
The order Erinaceomorpha contains a single family, Erinaceidae, which comprise the hedgehogs and gymnures. The hedgehogs are easily recognised by their spines while gymnures look more like large rats.

- Family: Erinaceidae (hedgehogs)
  - Subfamily: Erinaceinae
    - Genus: Erinaceus
      - Northern white-breasted hedgehog, E. roumanicus LC

== Order: Soricomorpha (shrews, moles, and solenodons) ==
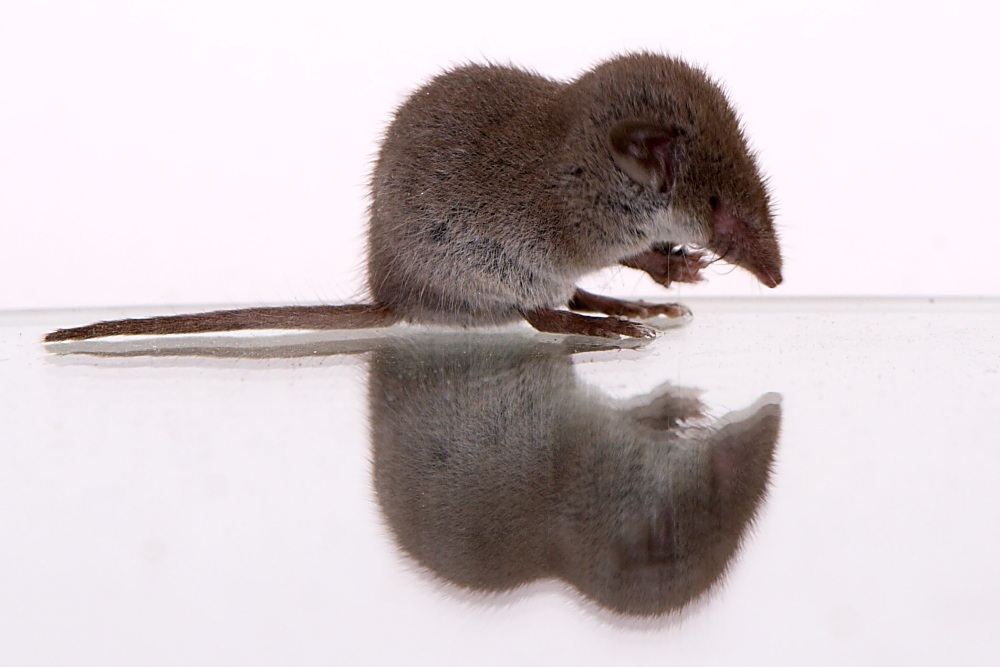
Lesser white-toothed shrew

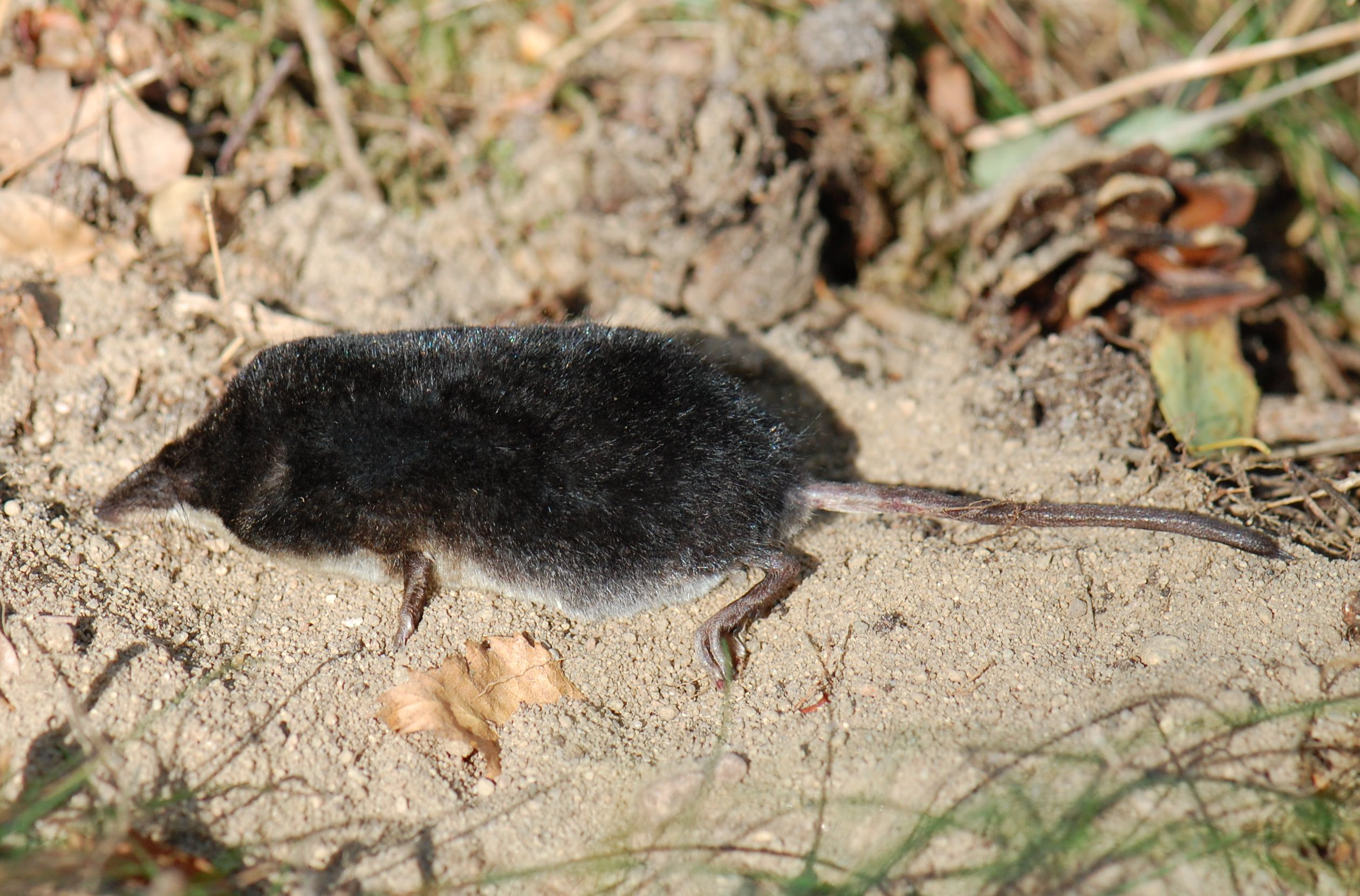
Eurasian water shrew

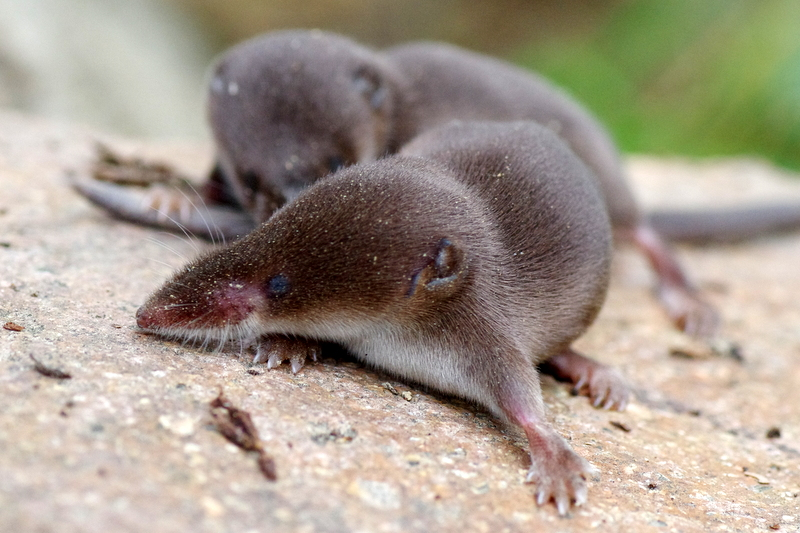
Common shrew

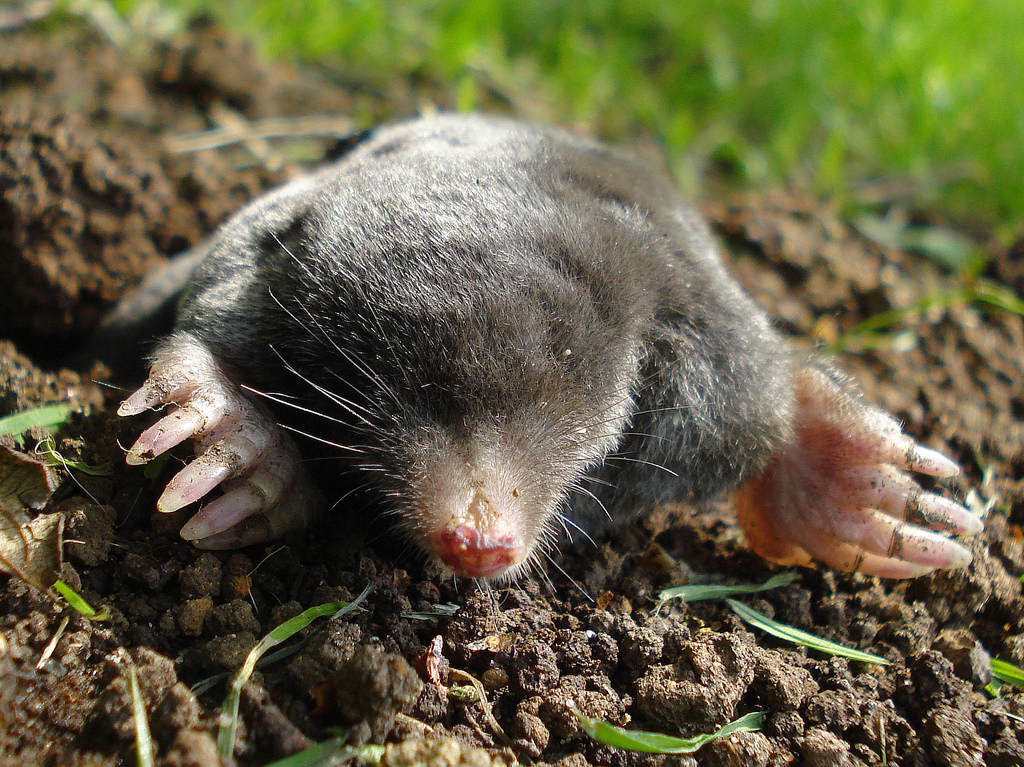
European mole

Shrews are insectivorous mammals. They closely resemble mice while the moles are stout-bodied burrowers.

- Family: Soricidae (shrews)
  - Subfamily: Crocidurinae
    - Genus: Crocidura
      - Bicolored shrew, C. leucodon LC
      - Greater white-toothed shrew, C. russula LC
      - Lesser white-toothed shrew, C. suaveolens LC
  - Subfamily: Soricinae
    - Tribe: Nectogalini
      - Genus: Neomys
        - Southern water shrew, N. anomalus LC
        - Eurasian water shrew, N. fodiens LC
    - Tribe: Soricini
      - Genus: Sorex
        - Alpine shrew, S. alpinus LC
        - Common shrew, S. araneus LC
        - Eurasian pygmy shrew, S. minutus LC
- Family: Talpidae (moles)
  - Subfamily: Talpinae
    - Tribe: Talpini
      - Genus: Talpa
        - European mole, T. europaea LC

== Order: Chiroptera (bats) ==
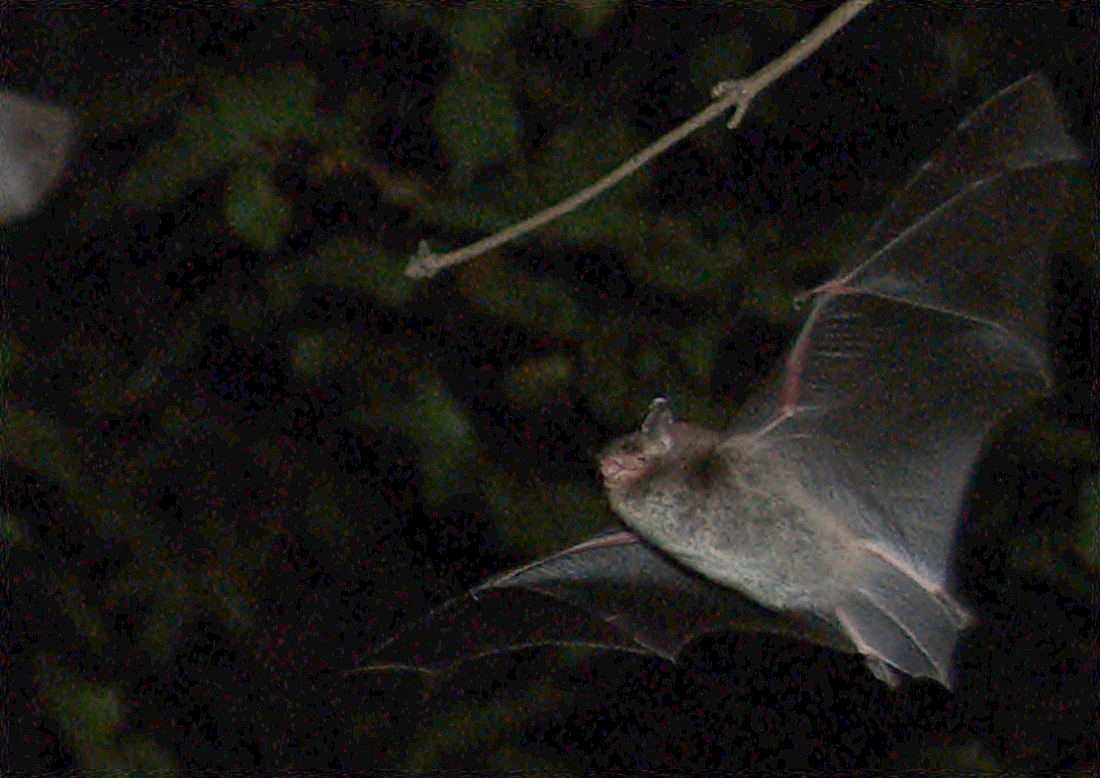
Daubenton's bat

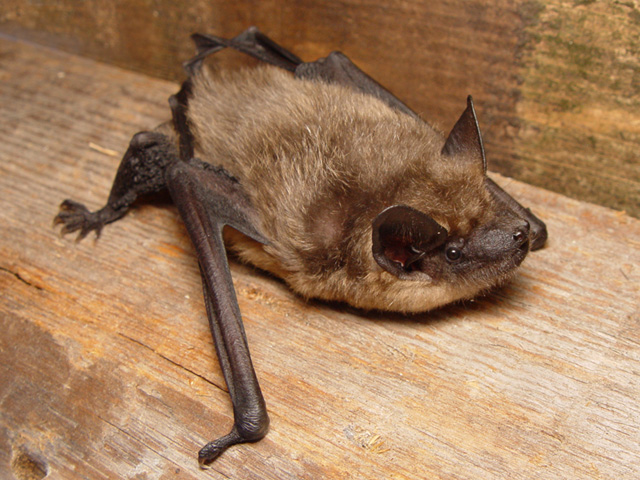
Serotine bat

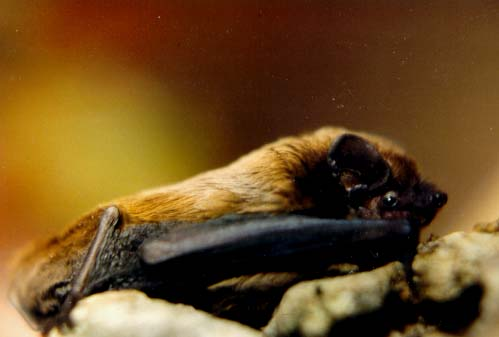
Lesser noctule

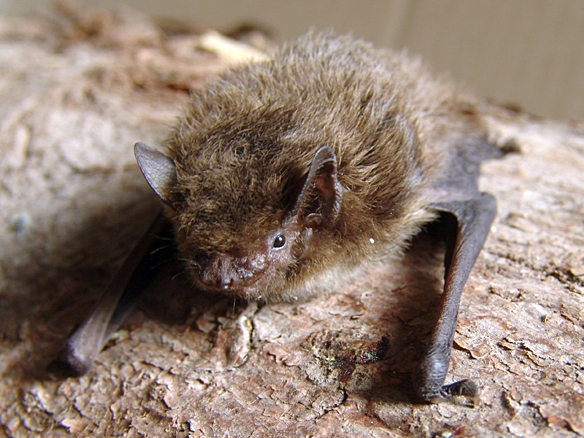
Nathusius' pipistrelle

The bats' most distinguishing feature is that their forelimbs are developed as wings, making them the only mammals capable of flight. Bat species account for about 20% of all mammals.

- Family: Vespertilionidae
  - Subfamily: Myotinae
    - Genus: Myotis
      - Bechstein's bat, M. bechsteini NT
      - Lesser mouse-eared bat, M. blythii LC
      - Brandt's bat, M. brandti LC
      - Long-fingered bat, M. capaccinii VU
      - Daubenton's bat, M. daubentonii LC
      - Geoffroy's bat, M. emarginatus LC
      - Greater mouse-eared bat, M. myotis LC
      - Natterer's bat, M. nattereri LC
  - Subfamily: Vespertilioninae
    - Genus: Barbastella
      - Western barbastelle, B. barbastellus NT
    - Genus: Eptesicus
      - Northern bat, Eptesicus nilssoni LC
      - Serotine bat, Eptesicus serotinus LC
    - Genus: Nyctalus
      - Greater noctule bat, N. lasiopterus NT
      - Lesser noctule, N. leisleri LC
      - Common noctule, N. noctula LC
    - Genus: Pipistrellus
      - Nathusius' pipistrelle, P. nathusii LC
      - Common pipistrelle, P. pipistrellus LC
    - Genus: Plecotus
      - Brown long-eared bat, P. auritus LC
      - Grey long-eared bat, P. austriacus LC
  - Subfamily: Miniopterinae
    - Genus: Miniopterus
      - Common bent-wing bat, M. schreibersii VU
- Family: Rhinolophidae
  - Subfamily: Rhinolophinae
    - Genus: Rhinolophus
      - Blasius's horseshoe bat, R. blasii LC
      - Mediterranean horseshoe bat, R. euryale NT
      - Greater horseshoe bat, R. ferrumequinum LC
      - Lesser horseshoe bat, R. hipposideros LC
      - Mehely's horseshoe bat, R. mehelyi VU

== Order: Cetacea (whales) ==
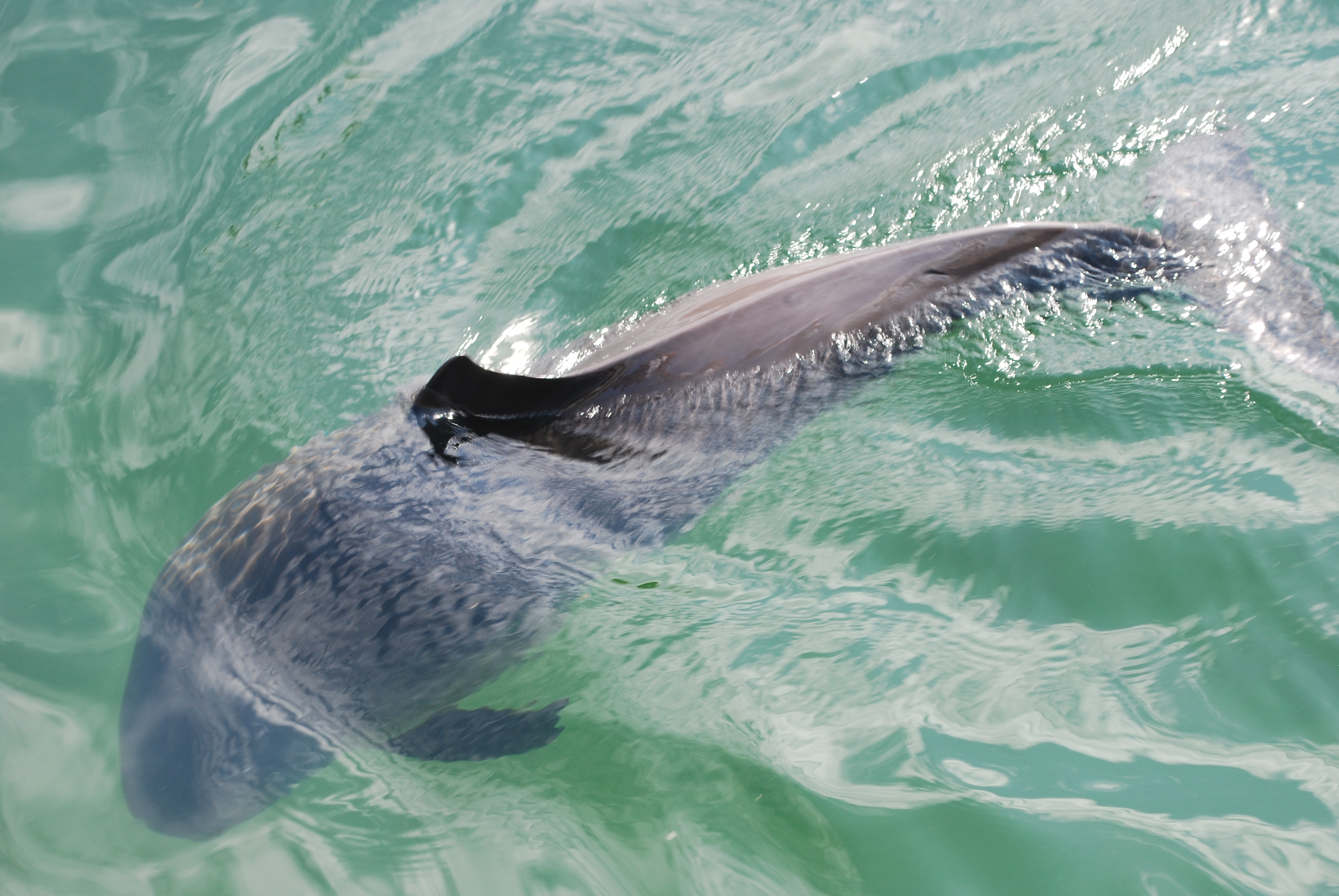
Harbour porpoise

The order Cetacea includes whales, dolphins and porpoises. They are the mammals most fully adapted to aquatic life with a spindle-shaped nearly hairless body, protected by a thick layer of blubber, and forelimbs and tail modified to provide propulsion underwater.

- Suborder: Odontoceti
  - Superfamily: Platanistoidea
    - Family: Phocoenidae
      - Genus: Phocoena
        - Harbour porpoise, Phocoena phocoena VU
    - Family: Delphinidae (marine dolphins)
      - Genus: Tursiops
        - Bottlenose dolphin, Tursiops truncatus DD
      - Genus: Delphinus
        - Short-beaked common dolphin, Delphinus delphis LC

== Order: Carnivora (carnivorans) ==
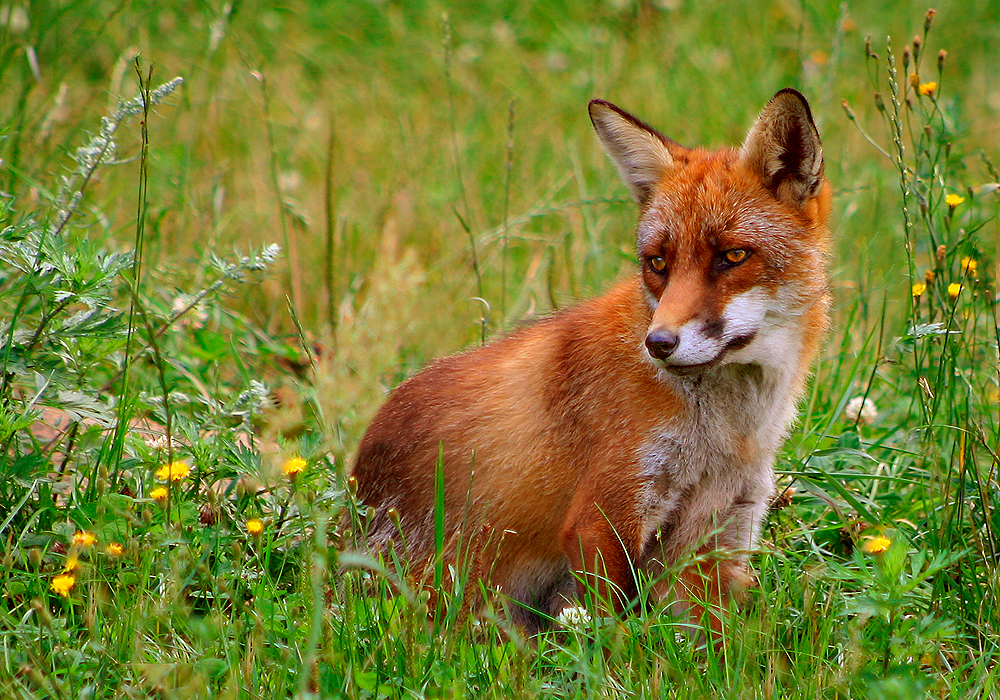
Red fox

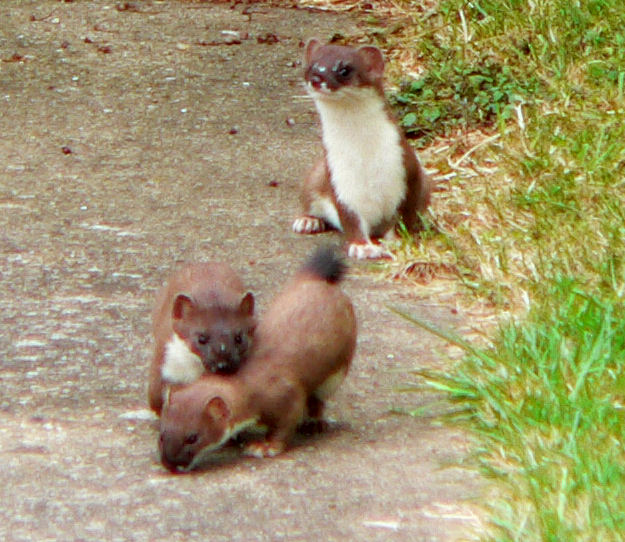
Stoat

There are over 260 species of carnivorans, the majority of which feed primarily on meat. They have a characteristic skull shape and dentition.

- Suborder: Feliformia
  - Family: Felidae (cats)
    - Subfamily: Felinae
      - Genus: Felis
        - European wildcat, F. silvestris LC
      - Genus: Lynx
        - Eurasian lynx, L. lynx LC
- Suborder: Caniformia
  - Family: Canidae (dogs, foxes)
    - Genus: Canis
      - Golden jackal, C. aureus LC
        - European jackal, C. a. moreoticus
      - Gray wolf, C. lupus LC
        - Eurasian wolf, C. l. lupus
    - Genus: Nyctereutes
      - Raccoon dog, N. procyonoides LC introduced
    - Genus: Vulpes
      - Red fox, V. vulpes LC
  - Family: Ursidae (bears)
    - Genus: Ursus
      - Brown bear, U. arctos LC
        - Eurasian brown bear, U. a. arctos
  - Family: Mustelidae (mustelids)
    - Genus: Lutra
      - European otter, L. lutra NT
    - Genus: Martes
      - Beech marten, M. foina LC
      - European pine marten, M. martes LC
    - Genus: Meles
      - European badger, M. meles LC
    - Genus: Mustela
      - Stoat, M. erminea LC
      - Steppe polecat, M. eversmannii LC
      - European mink, M. lutreola CR
      - Least weasel, M. nivalis LC
      - European polecat, M. putorius LC
    - Genus: Neogale
      - American mink, N. vison LC introduced
    - Genus: Vormela
      - Marbled polecat, V. peregusna VU

== Order: Artiodactyla (even-toed ungulates) ==
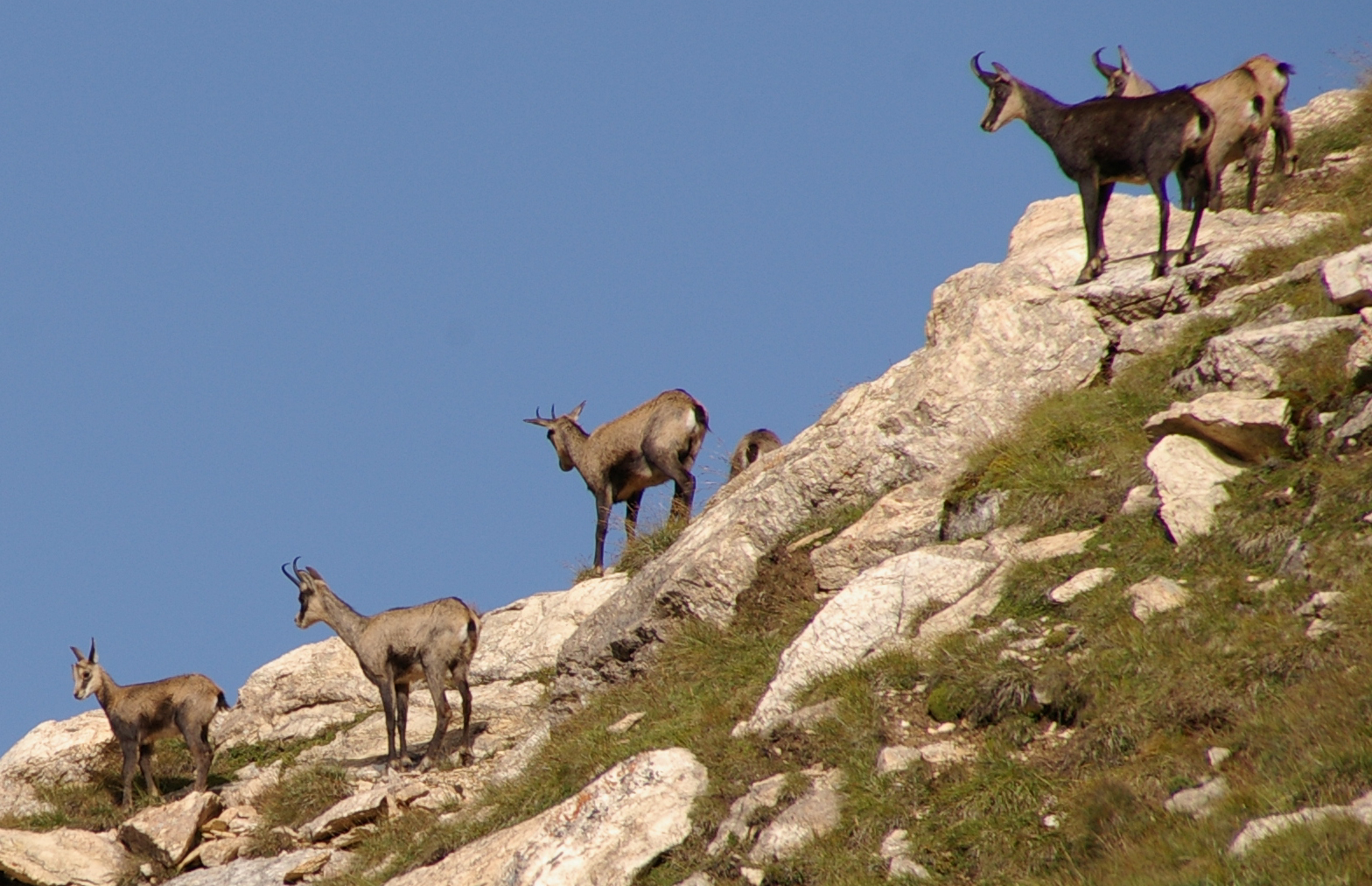
Chamois

The even-toed ungulates are ungulates whose weight is borne about equally by the third and fourth toes, rather than mostly or entirely by the third as in perissodactyls. There are about 220 artiodactyl species, including many that are of great economic importance to humans.

- Family: Bovidae (cattle, antelope, sheep, goats)
  - Subfamily: Bovinae
    - Genus: Bison
      - European bison, B. bonasus NT reintroduced
        - Carpathian wisent, B. b. hungarorum EX
  - Subfamily: Caprinae
    - Genus: Rupicapra
      - Chamois, R. rupicapra LC
- Family: Cervidae (deer)
  - Subfamily: Cervinae
    - Genus: Cervus
      - Red deer, C. elaphus LC
    - Genus: Dama
      - European fallow deer, D. dama LC introduced
  - Subfamily: Capreolinae
    - Genus: Alces
      - Moose, A. alces LC
    - Genus: Capreolus
      - Roe deer, C. capreolus LC
- Family: Suidae (pigs)
  - Subfamily: Suinae
    - Genus: Sus
      - Wild boar, S. scrofa LC

== Locally extinct ==
The following species are locally extinct in the country:

- Mediterranean monk seal, Monachus monachus

== See also ==
- List of chordate orders
- Lists of mammals by region
- List of prehistoric mammals
- Mammal classification
- List of mammals described in the 2000s
