= S. giganteus =

S. giganteus may refer to:

- Shantungosaurus giganteus, a flat headed hadrosaurid dinosaur species
- Spalax giganteus, the giant mole rat or Russian mole rat, a rodent species found in Kazakhstan
- Spirobranchus giganteus, the Christmas tree worm, a small tube-building polychaete worm species
