= Eversmann's hamster =

Conservation status
- Least Concern (IUCN 3.1)

Scientific classification
- Kingdom: Animalia
- Phylum: Chordata
- Class: Mammalia
- Infraclass: Placentalia
- Order: Rodentia
- Family: Cricetidae
- Subfamily: Cricetinae
- Genus: Allocricetulus
- Species: A. eversmanni

Binomial name
- Allocricetulus eversmanni (Brandt, 1859)

Species of rodent

Examples of distribution of C-heterochromatin in mammalian chromosomes, illustrating chromosomal studies relevant to rodent species like Eversmann's hamster

Eversmann's hamster (Allocricetulus eversmanni) is a species of hamster in the family Cricetidae, and is one of two members of the genus Allocricetulus. It is named after the Russian naturalist, zoologist, and explorer Eduard Friedrich Eversmann, who collected the holotype of this species. It is found in Kazakhstan, China, and Russia.

== Taxonomy & Subspecies ==
Evermann's hamster has a notable subspecies: Allocricetulus eversmanni pseudocurtatus. This hamster is similar in appearance to the Mongolian hamster (Allocricetulus curtatus); however its karyotype is nearly identical to that of the Eversmann's hamster (Allocricetulus eversmanni). There are karyological and morphological differences between Allocricetulus eversmanni pseudocurtatus and Allocricetulus eversmanni which support the idea that these subspecies form sister clades.
