= Kazakhstan blind mole-rat =

Conservation status
- Least Concern (IUCN 3.1)

Scientific classification
- Kingdom: Animalia
- Phylum: Chordata
- Class: Mammalia
- Order: Rodentia
- Family: Spalacidae
- Genus: Spalax
- Species: S. uralensis

Binomial name
- Spalax uralensis Tiflov and Usov, 1939

Species of rodent

The Kazakhstan blind mole-rat or Ural blind mole-rat (Spalax uralensis) is a species of rodent in the family Spalacidae. It is endemic to Kazakhstan, along the Ural River basin and the flood plains of the Uil, Temir, and Emba rivers.

Whereas the species has an extent of occurrence of 392,195 km2, the International Union for Conservation of Nature (IUCN) has described S. uralensis as rare and its habitat prone to overgrazing. In 1993, Puzachenko's morphometric analysis demonstrated that the species was distinct from the giant blind mole-rat (S. giganteus).
