= Mongolian hamster =

Conservation status
- Least Concern (IUCN 3.1)

Scientific classification
- Kingdom: Animalia
- Phylum: Chordata
- Class: Mammalia
- Infraclass: Placentalia
- Order: Rodentia
- Family: Cricetidae
- Subfamily: Cricetinae
- Genus: Allocricetulus
- Species: A. curtatus

Binomial name
- Allocricetulus curtatus (G. M. Allen, 1925)

Species of rodent

The Mongolian hamster (Allocricetulus curtatus) is a species of rodent in the family Cricetidae. It is one of two members of the genus Allocricetulus, and is found in China, Russia, and Mongolia.

The Mongolian hamster is a wild hamster and is not commonly kept as a pet. As of current status, the Mongolian hamster is not endangered.
