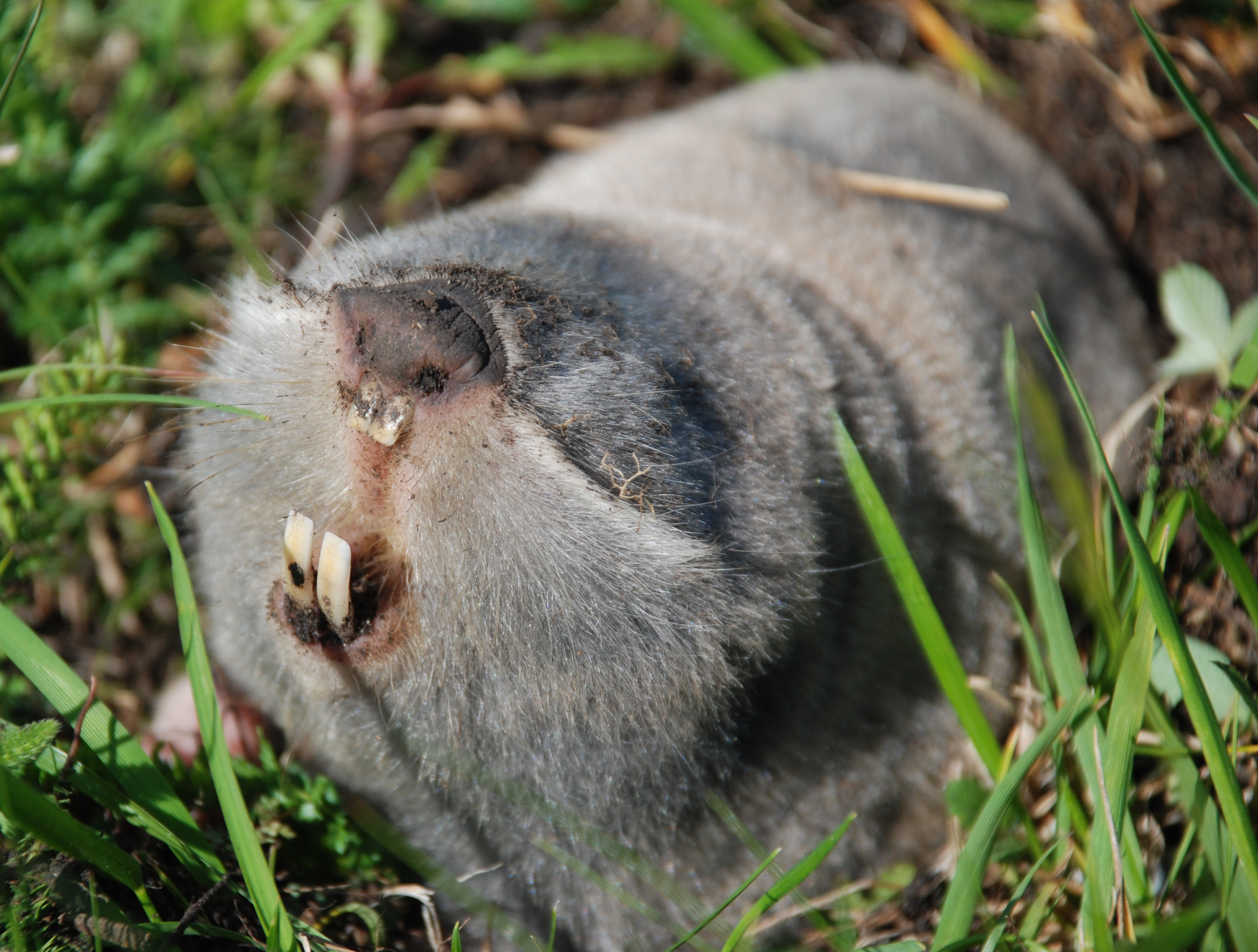
- Greater blind mole-rat (S. microphthalmus)

Scientific classification
- Kingdom: Animalia
- Phylum: Chordata
- Class: Mammalia
- Order: Rodentia
- Family: Spalacidae
- Subfamily: Spalacinae
- Genus: Spalax; Güldenstädt, 1770

Type species
- Spalax microphthalmus Güldenstädt, 1770

Species
- Spalax antiquus Spalax arenarius Spalax giganteus Spalax graecus Spalax istricus Spalax microphthalmus Spalax uralensis Spalax zemni

= Spalax =

Genus of rodents

Spalax is a genus of rodent in the family Spalacidae, subfamily Spalacinae (blind mole-rats). It is one of two extant genera in the subfamily Spalacinae, alongside Nannospalax.

Species in this genus are found in Eastern Europe and Western & Central Asia. They are completely blind and have a subterranean lifestyle.

== Taxonomy ==
Prior to 2013, Spalax was widely considered the only member of Spalacinae, with all blind mole-rat species being grouped within it. However, phylogenetic and morphological evidence supported some of the species within it forming a distinct lineage that diverged from the others during the Late Miocene, when a marine barrier formed between Anatolia and the Balkans. These species were reclassified into the genus Nannospalax, making Spalax one of two extant spalacine genera.

== Species ==
- Mehely's blind mole-rat, S. antiquus
- Sandy blind mole-rat, S. arenarius
- Giant blind mole-rat, S. giganteus
- Bukovina blind mole-rat, S. graecus
- Oltenia blind mole-rat, S. istricus (possibly extinct)
- Greater blind mole-rat, S. microphthalmus
- Kazakhstan blind mole-rat, S. uralensis
- Podolsk blind mole-rat, S. zemni
