= Oltenia blind mole-rat =

Conservation status
- Critically endangered, possibly extinct (IUCN 3.1)

Scientific classification
- Kingdom: Animalia
- Phylum: Chordata
- Class: Mammalia
- Order: Rodentia
- Family: Spalacidae
- Genus: Spalax
- Species: S. istricus

Binomial name
- Spalax istricus (Méhelÿ, 1909)

Synonyms
- Spalax graecus istricus

Species of rodent

The Oltenia blind mole-rat (Spalax istricus) is a critically endangered, possibly extinct species of rodent in the family Spalacidae. It is endemic to Romania.

== Taxonomy ==
Previously described in 1909 by Lajos Méhelÿ as a subspecies of the Bukovina blind mole-rat (S. graecus), a 2013 morphological and phylogenetic analysis found it to be a distinct, well-defined species. Its closest taxonomic relations remain unclear due to a lack of genetic material from available specimens. The American Society of Mammalogists and IUCN Red List follow the results of this study.

== Distribution and habitat ==
This species is restricted to southern Romania, in the historical regions of Oltenia and Muntenia. It inhabits hilly and flat terrain of the Wallachian Plain, covered by steppe or forest-steppe vegetation. It likely inhabits similar habitats to Mehely's blind mole-rat (S. antiquus).

== Status ==
This species is classified as critically endangered or possibly extinct on the IUCN Red List. Historically, blind mole-rats were persecuted as agricultural pests. However, the primary threat leading to this species' decline is thought to be agricultural intensification and conversion of habitat to ploughed fields.

No individuals have been sighted at previous localities it was known from despite repeated survey efforts, and there have been no sightings of this species since 1983. If still extant, it likely has a small extent of occurrence, and if it still occurs in the localities it was previously known from, its population is likely highly fragmented.
