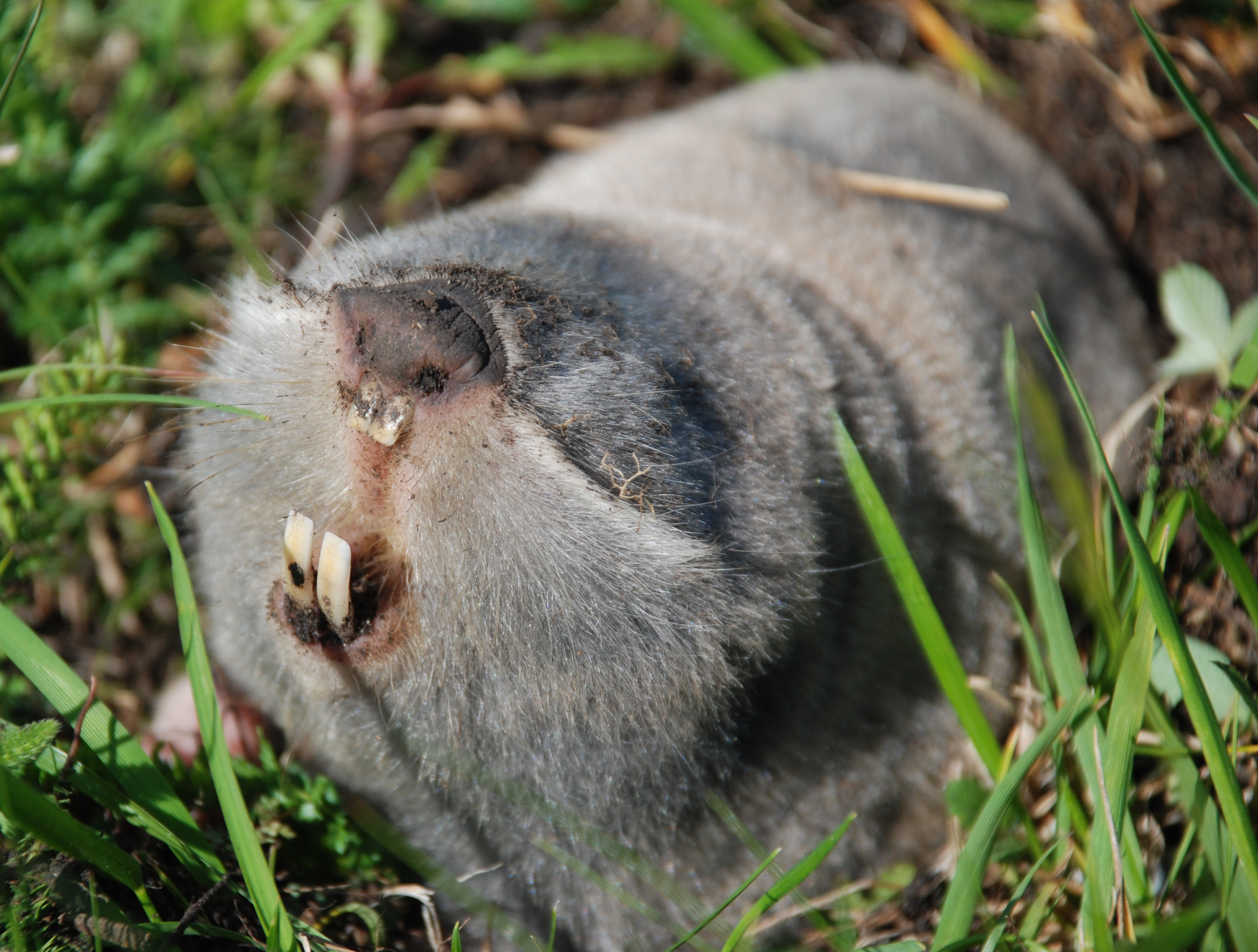

Conservation status
- Least Concern (IUCN 3.1)

Scientific classification
- Kingdom: Animalia
- Phylum: Chordata
- Class: Mammalia
- Order: Rodentia
- Family: Spalacidae
- Genus: Spalax
- Species: S. microphthalmus

Binomial name
- Spalax microphthalmus Gueldenstaedt, 1770

Synonyms
- Spalax pallasii Nordmann, 1839; Spalax typhlus Pallas, 1779

= Greater blind mole-rat =

Species of rodent

The greater blind mole-rat (Spalax microphthalmus) is a species of rodent in the family Spalacidae. It is found in Russia and Ukraine.

== Description ==
The greater blind mole-rat is tailless. The eyes are covered by a membrane of skin and have atrophied lens cells enclosed in a vesicle and a retinal layer. It has prominent incisor teeth, which are used for burrowing. The fur is greyish, but can vary in color. It can grow to a size of 31 cm (12 in) and weigh up to 570 g (20 oz). Its dental formula is 1.0.0.31.0.0.3.

== Distribution and habitat ==
The greater blind mole-rat is known from the steppes of Ukraine and from southern Russia between the Dnieper and the Volga rivers. Its range extends northwards to the Oryol to Kursk railway line and southwards to the North Caucasus. It favours lowland habitats with black earth, avoiding sandy or loamy soils. It inhabits steppes and forest steppes, agricultural land, plantations, orchards and gardens and can be a pest.

== Behavior ==
The greater blind mole-rat is a fossorial species that stays underground except when dispersing to new territories as juveniles, a period of great vulnerability. It lives a solitary existence, except during the breeding season. Due to its atrophied eyes it is totally blind. The paws are not modified like the ones of the moles; it digs with its incisor teeth instead.

It is a herbivore and feeds on the roots of such plants as dandelions, umbellifers, chicory and tree seedlings, approaching them from underneath. It gathers excess food and stores it in its burrow, sometimes as much as 14 kg (30 lb) being collected. Breeding takes place once a year with a litter of two to five young being born in March.

== Status ==
In general the greater blind mole-rat is a common species, but somewhat patchily distributed. The International Union for Conservation of Nature has rated its conservation status as being of "least concern".
