= Mehely's blind mole-rat =

Conservation status
- Endangered (IUCN 3.1)

Scientific classification
- Kingdom: Animalia
- Phylum: Chordata
- Class: Mammalia
- Infraclass: Placentalia
- Order: Rodentia
- Family: Spalacidae
- Genus: Spalax
- Species: S. antiquus

Binomial name
- Spalax antiquus Méhelÿ, 1909

Synonyms
- Spalax graecus antiquus

Species of rodent

Mehely's blind mole-rat (Spalax antiquus) is an endangered species of rodent in the family Spalacidae. It is endemic to Romania.

== Taxonomy ==
Previously described in 1909 by Lajos Méhelÿ as a subspecies of the Bukovina blind mole-rat (S. graecus), a 2013 morphological and phylogenetic analysis found it and the Oltenia blind mole-rat (S. istricus) to be distinct, well-defined species. It is thought to be the sister species to S. graecus, and it is thought that the Carpathian Orogeny led to the separation of both species. The American Society of Mammalogists and IUCN Red List follow the results of this study.

== Distribution and habitat ==
This species is restricted to central Romania, where it is thought to be an endemic species of the Carpathian Basin. It inhabits steppe and forest-steppe grasslands on the Transylvanian Plain. Its habitats are largely used as pastureland, although it avoids overgrazed pastures.

== Status ==
This species has suffered a heavy decline in recent decades, and is classified as an endangered species by the IUCN Red List. It is thought to number between 3,550 and 3,800 mature individuals, and may have been extirpated from the southern and southeastern regions of the Transylvanian Plain.

The primary threat to this species are the different factors leading to habitat loss; most populations only survive in suboptimal habitat due as the heavy cultivation of the most favorable habitats, which are fertile loess soils. The most important factor leading to its decline is deep tillage, which prevents the formation of suitable vegetation types and destroys the burrows of this species. In addition, this species is threatened by development and overgrazing of its habitats. Climate change may also affect this species, as genetic and fossil evidence indicates that blind mole-rats were historically sensitive to climate fluctuations (prior fluctuations spurred diversification rather than extinction among mole-rats, but there are little to no dispersal capabilities left for mole-rats in the modern day in order to adapt to ongoing changes), but the extent and direction of this impact remains uncertain.
