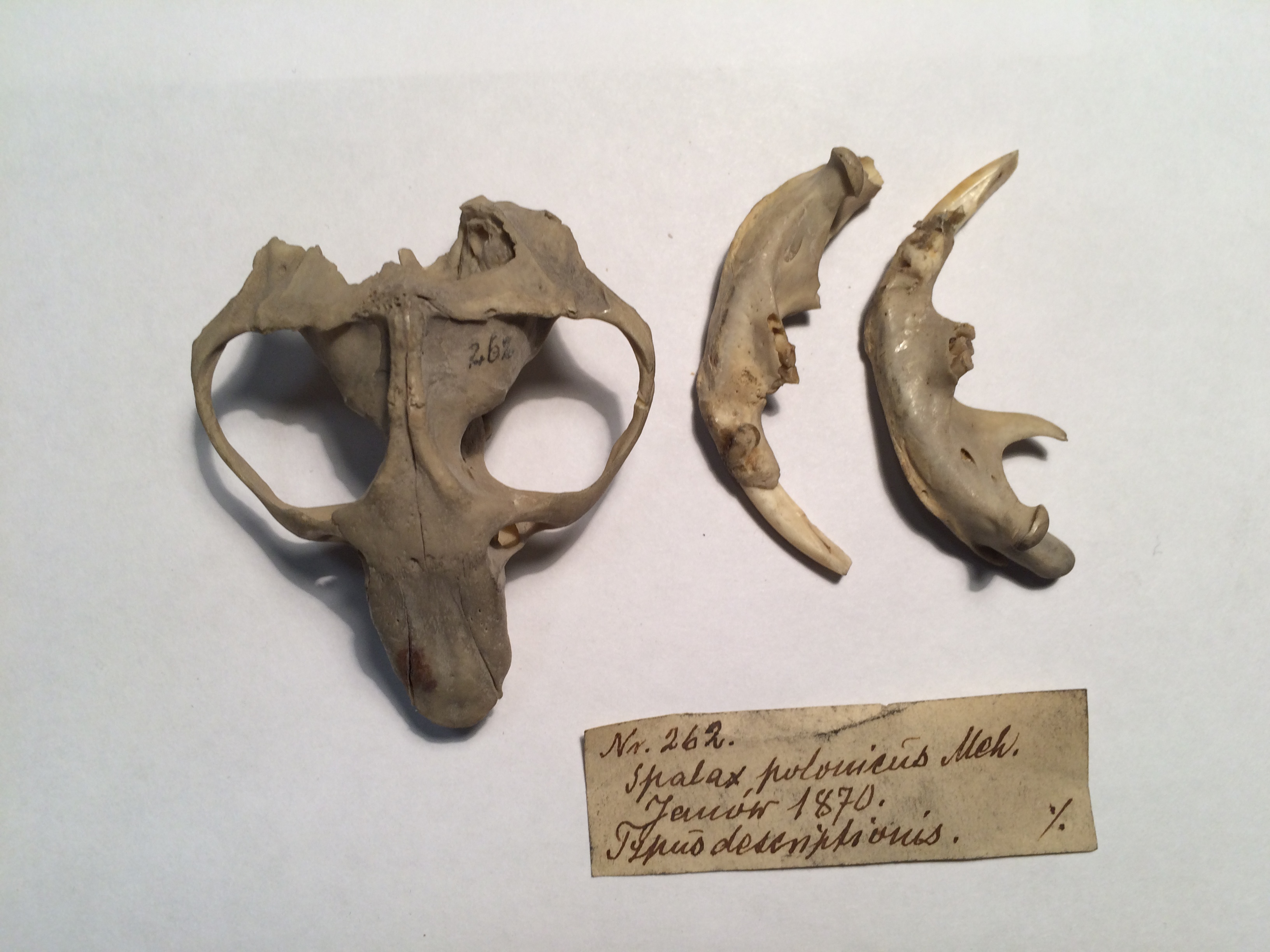
- Skull of the type specimen

Conservation status
- Endangered (IUCN 3.1)

Scientific classification
- Kingdom: Animalia
- Phylum: Chordata
- Class: Mammalia
- Order: Rodentia
- Family: Spalacidae
- Genus: Spalax
- Species: S. zemni

Binomial name
- Spalax zemni Erxleben, 1777

Synonyms
- Spalax polonicus

= Podolsk blind mole-rat =

Species of rodent

The Podolsk blind mole-rat or Podolian mole-rat (Spalax zemni) is a species of rodent in the family Spalacidae. It is endemic to western and central Ukraine.

== Distribution and habitat ==
It has a wide but severely fragmented range throughout Ukraine, ranging from the near the border with Poland south to near the border with Moldova, and east to central Ukraine. It primarily inhabits undeveloped steppe habitat, but also side roads, forest belts, agricultural fields, and even former military firing ranges.

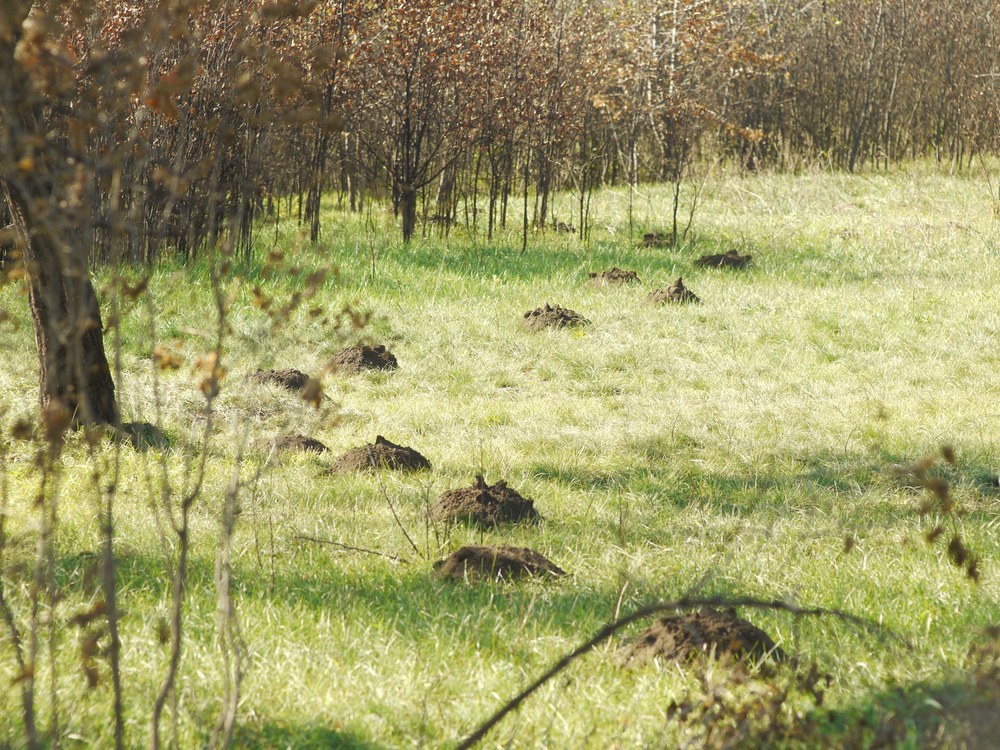
Burrows near Mykolaiv

== Conservation status ==
This species is thought to be threatened by habitat loss due to cultivation and development, and is classified as endangered on the IUCN Red List. It has a highly fragmented population, and the relatively wide range that this species is thought to have throughout Ukraine may be an overestimate for this reason. Data suggests that it has been declining since historical times due to shrinking of the steppe habitat, and it has been considered a rare species since the end of the 19th century.
