= Bukovina blind mole-rat =

Conservation status
- Vulnerable (IUCN 3.1)

Scientific classification
- Kingdom: Animalia
- Phylum: Chordata
- Class: Mammalia
- Order: Rodentia
- Family: Spalacidae
- Genus: Spalax
- Species: S. graecus

Binomial name
- Spalax graecus Nehring, 1898

Species of rodent

The Bukovina blind mole-rat or (erroneously) the Balkan blind mole-rat (Spalax graecus) is a species of rodent in the family Spalacidae found in Romania, Moldova, and Ukraine.

== Taxonomy ==
The specific epithet graecus, as well as the reference to the Balkans in its former scientific name, both derive from the type specimen, which was initially thought to have been collected in the vicinity of Athens, Greece. However, in 1969 this was found to be erroneous, and the type locality was corrected to the vicinity of Chernovtsy, Ukraine.

Formerly, this species was thought to comprise three disjunct subspecies: the type subspecies graecus, inhabiting northern Romania, Moldova, and southwestern Ukraine, Mehely's blind mole-rat (subspecies antiquus), thought to be endemic to central Romania, and the possibly extinct Oltenia blind mole-rat (subspecies istricus), thought to be endemic to southern Romania. However, a 2013 morphological and phylogenetic analysis found antiquus and istricus to represent distinct species from graecus. The American Society of Mammalogists and IUCN Red List followed the results of this study. This leaves S. graecus with a much smaller distribution than it was previously thought to have.

== Description ==
These mole-rats have a long, cylindrical body with no neck and relatively weak limbs. The Bukovina mole rats are blind and do not possess any external ears.

== Distribution and habitat ==
This species is found in a small area of northeastern Romania, southwestern Ukraine, and northwestern Moldova. Part of its range roughly coincides with the historical region of Bukovina. It inhabits steppe, pastures, cultivated fields, and orchards.

== Threats ==
This species is thought to be threatened by intensive agriculture, which has been implicated in the decline of the sympatric lesser blind mole-rat (Nannospalax leucodon) in the same region. In Transylvania, subsistence agriculture is still practiced, and thus the population appears stable there, but the addition of Romania to the European Union in the 2007 enlargement of the European Union may spur further intensive agriculture within its habitat.

Infrastructure and road-planning may also pose a risk to the species. In 2013, the species was considered the second most vulnerable mammalian species to road-impact incidents in Europe.
