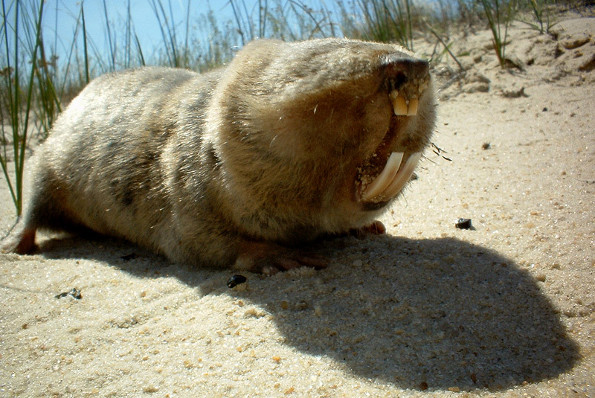

Conservation status
- Least Concern (IUCN 3.1)

Scientific classification
- Kingdom: Animalia
- Phylum: Chordata
- Class: Mammalia
- Order: Rodentia
- Family: Spalacidae
- Genus: Spalax
- Species: S. giganteus

Binomial name
- Spalax giganteus Nehring, 1898

= Giant blind mole-rat =

Species of rodent

The giant blind mole-rat (Spalax giganteus) is a species of rodent in the family Spalacidae endemic to the North Caucasus region of Russia. It feeds on roots and tubers and lives underground in a burrow that it digs with its teeth.

== Distribution and habitat ==
The giant blind mole-rat is native to the North Caucasus, Chechnya, and southern Kalmykia located between the northern ends of the Caspian and Black Seas. It is restricted to a range of less than 50,000 km^{2} (19,000 sq mi), and its distribution within that area is quite patchy. It lives underground in burrows in damp, sandy soils in semidesert areas, in river valleys, on plains, in shrubby or reedy areas, and in disturbed and cultivated soils.

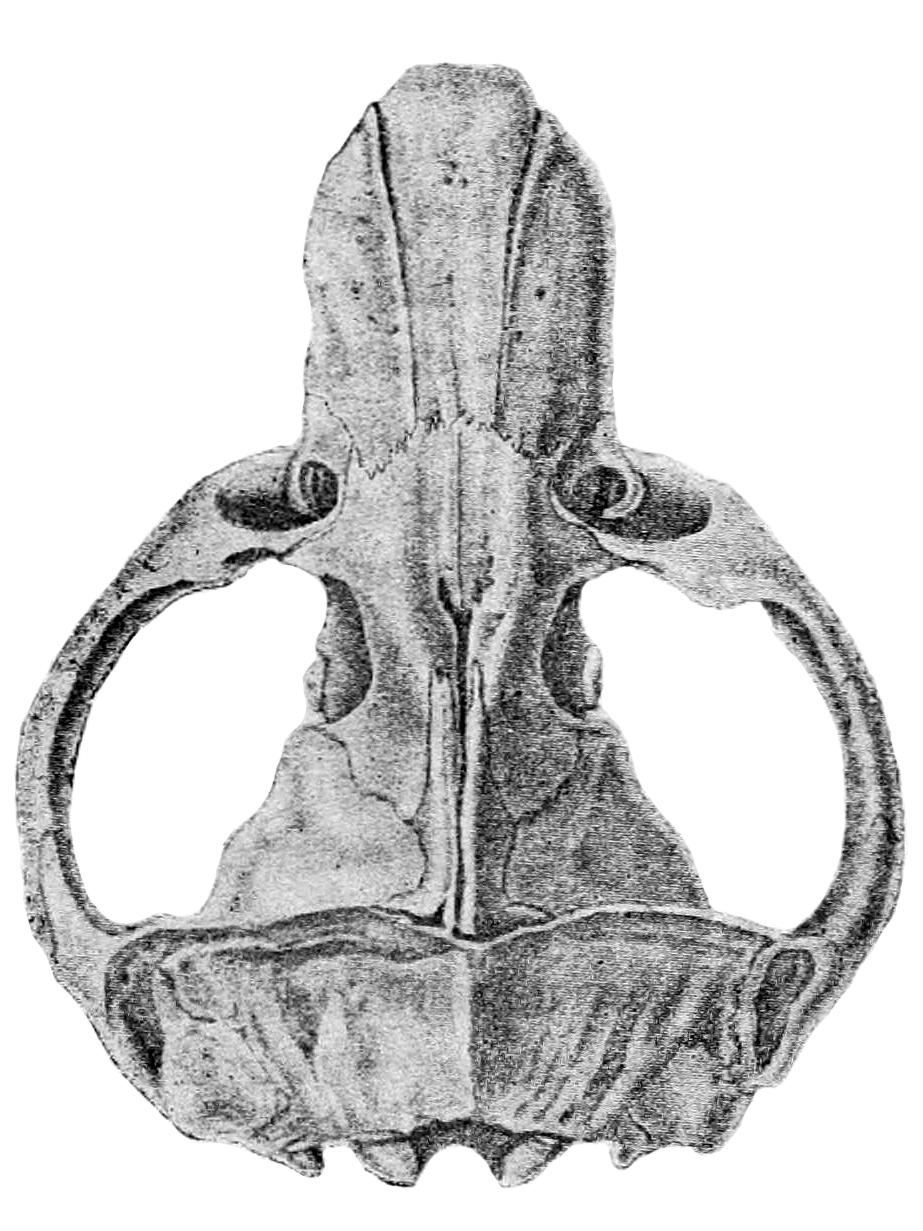
Skull

== Behaviour ==
The giant blind mole-rat is active all year round. It lives a largely subterranean existence in the burrow that it digs and is believed to be monogamous. Breeding activities usually occur in December and January and females produce litters of two or three young.

Besides using its incisor teeth for gnawing its food of roots and tubers, the giant blind mole-rat uses them to dig burrows. The teeth grow continually and need to be ground down to keep them sharp and functional. This is achieved by grinding the upper and lower teeth together by raising, lowering, and protruding the mandible in a cyclical movement.

== Status ==
Within its range, the giant blind mole-rat has a patchy distribution and is thought to have an actual area of occupancy of less than 37,000 km^{2} (14,000 sq mi). The sandy desert areas in which it lives are of little interest for agriculture, and the International Union for Conservation of Nature, although previously listing it as vulnerable, now lists it as a "least-concern species" in its Red List of Threatened Species.
