= Tomasiella immunophila =

Scientific classification
- Domain: Bacteria
- Kingdom: Pseudomonadati
- Phylum: Bacteroidota
- Class: Bacteroidia
- Order: Bacteroidales
- Family: Muribaculaceae
- Genus: Tomasiella
- Species: T. immunophila

Binomial name
- Tomasiella immunophila

Gut bacteria found in mice

Tomasiella immunophila is a gram-negative bacterium that was found in the gut of mice. It is believed to be able to break down SIgA. It is hypothesized to be the root of Inflammatory bowel disease and other immunodeficient issues. The genus Tomasiella is named after the late Dr. Thomas Tomasi, a scientist who discovered Secretory Immunoglobulin A (SIgA), an essential part of the immune system. The name is combined with the latin suffix "-ella", meaning extremely small. The species name immunophila comes from the prefix "immuno-" for the immune system, and the Greek word "-philos", meaning "loving". It was chosen because of the bacteria's ability to interact with the immune system by breaking down SIgA, which causes immunodeficiency, or weakened bodily defenses...

== Classification ==
=== Taxonomy ===
Tomasiella immunophila is part of the Muribaculaceae family, which is in the order Bacteroidales. It was first grouped as part of the genus CAG-873, until later studies placed it in its own genus, Tomasiella. Although not much is known yet, current research suggests that T. immunophila doesn't seem to cause much harm. The Muribaculaceae family includes symbiotic bacteria that live in the intestines of mice, where they survive without oxygen as anaerobic bacteria

=== Relatives ===
Within its order (Bacteriodales), T. immunophila is most similar to a species called Tannerella forsythia. Both bacteria require a special compound called MurNAc to help build their cell walls because of their auxotrophy - a mutation that prevents their growth. Within the Muribaculaceae family, T. immunophila is closely related to two species: Duncaniella dubosii and Muribaculum intestinale

== Morphology ==
Tomasiella immunophila is a type of gram-negative bacteria, meaning it has a thin cell wall with an outer membrane made up of special molecules called lipopolysaccharides. However, T. immunophila have cell wall auxotrophy, meaning that they are missing an important part to fully be able to build their cell wall. Therefore, they have to get it from an outside source, in the form of the compound MurNAc. Due to this auxotrophy, they are irregularly shaped, with no established cellular morphology (a cell's shape, size, and appearance). However, it takes on a rod-like shape (bacillus) when grown with N-acetylmuramic acid (MurNAc), since its missing the enzymes (MurA, MurB, and GlmS) that other bacteria use to make MurNAc on their own.

== Discovery ==
An article was released September 2024 discussing a new discovery made by Thaddeus Stappenbeck and Qiuhe Lu, who led the research project at Cleveland Clinic. The research was based on identifying what is responsible for SIgA breakdown. SIgA, or secretory immunoglobulin A, is an important component of the gut mucosal barrier that is responsible for protection of the gut against infections and pathogens. If SIgA were to decrease in levels, there is a higher risk of infection, inflammation, and illness. The researchers utilized next-generation sequencing which is a form of being able to determine the sequence of DNA by separating into smaller fragments. This procedure was performed on mice with low and high levels of SIgA. The feces of mice are collected and then the sample is cultured anaerobically, in an environment that does not contain oxygen. The cultured samples were tested using various agars, antibiotics, and tests to confirm the break down of SIgA which is when the unknown bacteria strain was confirmed as a separate group. The various microorganisms were determined using 16S ribosomal RNA gene amplicon sequencing which is a process of identifying the bacteria using a genetic marker. The organisms found in the mices' feces were Allobaculum, Sutterella, Clostridiaceae, Muribaculaceae and an unknown strain. By using a genome taxonomy database toolkit, an identification tool, the unknown bacteria was determined to be another relative to the Muribaculaceae. The bacteria was named Tomasiella immunophila. Tomasiella immunophila underwent fluorescence in situ hybridization (FISH) and polymerase chain reaction (PCR). The goal of FISH is to detect desired genes and/or gene sequences while the goal of PCRs is to multiply a specific gene sequence so it can be further analyzed and studied. The bacteria is present throughout the gastrointestinal tract but was pinpointed to mainly be concentrated in the cecum and colon

In vitro assays showed Tomasiella immunophila was able to degrade other immunoglobulin compounds like IgA, IgM, and IgE, which are different types of antibodies in our immune system. The only immunoglobulin left untouched was IgG. Tomasiella immunophila degradation factors were found due to scanning electron microscopy which is a way to magnify the organism's surface to be able to see it and analyze it. This procedure revealed multiple outer membrane vesicles which are small sacs that carry various bacterial components. In the presence of Tomasiella immunophila, the mice immune system began secreting antibodies specific to the bacterium. With a generally weakened mucosal barrier, the mice were immunodeficient and were unable to repair their defense barriers when faced with dextran sulfate sodium-induced injury (a way to simulate inflammatory bowel disease)

== Genomics ==
Tomasiella immunophila was discovered to have special metabolic genes that let it use the compound MurNAc and add it to its peptidoglycan layer, an important part of the inner cell wall that helps it keep its shape. This helps the bacteria build its cell wall even though it can't make MurNAc on its own. Comparing its DNA to that of related bacteria, T. immunophila was also found to have multiple, unique proteases, which are enzymes that help break down other proteins.

16s rRNA gene sequencing, a method to identify and tell different types of bacteria apart, allowed both the identification of other bacteria related to T. immunophila, and its original classification under the genus CAG-873. Using the strain DCM001, whole-genome sequencing - a method to sequence a species' entire genome - was made possible, allowing them to correctly place it in its own genus, Tomasiella. It revealed that its genomic DNA has a G+C content of 50.93% and includes exactly 190 enzymes that help break down carbohydrates. Its entire linear DNA is made up of 3,637,252 base pairs (bp)

== Metabolism ==
As part of the Muribaculaceae family, T. immunophila have a number of actions within the intestine, such as synthesizing short-chain fatty acids, interacting with probiotics for increased growth, and detecting diseases, such as Type II Diabetes and Inflammatory Bowel Disease.

Tomasiella immunophila's ability to break down IgA is a complex process. Outer Membrane Vesicles (OMVs) are hypothesized to be a big component of that. OMVs are sacs that contain various bacterial components that are released by Gram-negative bacteria. They spread out from its source to cover more ground and release its content. Inside, the OMVs contain proteases that break down IgA. The proteases target the kappa-light chains specifically, which are a specific part of the structure of the immunoglobulins. By breaking down the kappa-light chains, it is able to stop immunoglobulins from functioning and therefore reducing immunity of the gut

MurNAc is a building block for bacterial cell walls. It is an important enzyme for Tomasiella immunophila because it helps with the synthesis of the cell wall (allowing the bacteria to get its shape) and works alongside muramyl dipeptide and peptidoglycan for cell growth.

Researchers tested the presence of these enzymes in Tomasiella immunophila by observing if it would grow without them. Since growth of Tomasiella immunophila was not inhibited even though the action of MurA, MurB, and GlmS enzymes were, it is safe to state that the bacteria does not make them or have them.

To use the gut to its advantage, T. immunophila degrades SIgA to release more amino acids. This will not only increase the amount of MurNAc available but also release other glycans for glycan metabolism. Glycan metabolism is an essential process for the bacterium because it increases the availability of MurNAc. Without the presence of MurNAc, they remain inactive

== Ecology ==
Tomasiella immunophila - a type of symbiotic bacteria - was found within the intestines of mice. The bacterium was discovered to be auxotrophic, meaning it relies on its host for nutrients, proteins, or enzymes to survive. In this case, T. immunophila uses a sugar found in the gut called N-acetylmuramic acid to grow cell walls and reproduce. Since the bacterium is closely attached to the human body, it is a challenge to get rid of it without harming the host. As of right now, scientists have identified two drugs that are able to eliminate the bacterium. Erythromycin, a macrolide antibiotic aimed at targeting gut bacteria, was discovered to inhibit SIgA breakdown. The bacteria is also sensitive to vancomycin, an antibiotic that prevents bacterial cell wall development, which was discovered when mice with low IgA levels were treated with vancomycin, leading to an increase in IgA and elimination of the bacterium
