= Microbiota-accessible carbohydrates =

Carbohydrates resistant to digestion

Microbiota-accessible carbohydrates (MACs) are carbohydrates that are resistant to digestion by a host's metabolism, and are made available for gut microbes, as prebiotics, to ferment or metabolize into beneficial compounds, such as short chain fatty acids. The term, ‘‘microbiota-accessible carbohydrate’’ contributes to a conceptual framework for investigating and discussing the amount of metabolic activity that a specific food or carbohydrate can contribute to a host's microbiota.

MACs may come from plants, fungi, animal tissues, or food-borne microbes, and must be metabolized by the microbiome. A significant quantity of the cellulose humans consume is not metabolized by gut microbes and therefore cannot be considered a MAC. The amount of dietary MACs found within a food source will differ for each individual, since which carbohydrates are metabolized depends upon the composition of each person's microbiota. For example, many Japanese individuals possess the genes for the consumption of the algal polysaccharide porphyran in their microbiomes, which are rarely found in North American and European individuals. For individuals who harbor such a porphyran-degrading strain, porphyran would be a MAC. However, porphyran would not be a MAC for those without a microbiota adaptation to seaweed. In similar fashion, germ-free mice without a microbiota might consume a diet with large quantities of potential MACs, but none of the carbohydrates would be considered MACs, since they would escape the digestive tract without being metabolized by microbes.

Lack of dietary MACs results in a microbiota reliant upon endogenous host-derived MACs, such as mucin glycans. Different host genotypes can influence the identity of MACs available to the microbiota in multiple ways. For example, a host's genes may affect the level of mucus structures, such as the absence of alpha-1-2 fucose residues in the mucus of nonsecretor individuals who lack alpha-1-2- fucosyltransferase activity in the intestine. Similarly, a host may have genes that can determine the efficiency of digestion and absorption of carbohydrates in the small intestine. For example, lactose is accessible to the microbiota in people who are lactose intolerant, and should therefore be considered a MAC for those individuals. For nursing infants, dietary MACs that are naturally found in breast milk are known as human milk oligosaccharides (HMOs). For formula-fed infants, dietary MACs, such as galacto-oligosaccharides, are artificially added to formula. Therefore, the research, discussion and quantification of MACs and their impact on a host's microbiota may be critical to determining their impact on human health.

== Gut microbiota diversity ==
Diets in developed countries have lost microbiota-accessible carbohydrates which is the cause of a substantial depletion of gut microbiota taxa. This loss of microbiota diversity is likely involved in the increasing propensity for a broad range of inflammatory diseases, such as allergic disease, asthma, inflammatory bowel disease (IBD), obesity, and associated non-communicable diseases (NCDs). Rural human communities from South America and Africa have a low prevalence of NCDs and this fact has been related with a higher gut microbiota diversity. Some of these lost taxa belong to the families of Bacteroidales (Bacteroides fragilis, B. ovatus, B. uniformis, B. distasonis, Parabacteroides gordonii), Clostridiales (Ruminococcus gnavus, Blautia producta, Faecalibacterium prausnitzii) and Verrucomicrobiales (Akkermansia muciniphila). Introduction of dietary MACs in the diet is insufficient to regain the lost taxa, to restore the gut microbiota to its original state requires the administration of missing taxa, which can be achieved either by administering probiotics (food) or live biotherapeutics (drugs), in combination with dietary MAC consumption. Enriching the food supply with dietary fiber might have an essential role in preventing loss of certain beneficial bacterial species.
