= Barnesiella viscericola =

Scientific classification
- Domain: Bacteria
- Kingdom: Pseudomonadati
- Phylum: Bacteroidota
- Class: Bacteroidia
- Order: Bacteroidales
- Family: Barnesiellaceae
- Genus: Barnesiella
- Species: B. viscericola

Binomial name
- Barnesiella viscericola Sakamoto et al. 2007

Type strain
- C46, DSM 18177, JCM 13660

Synonyms
- Barnesella viscericola

Species of bacterium

Barnesiella viscericola is a Gram-negative, obligately anaerobic, non-spore-forming and non-motile bacterium from the genus of Barnesiella which has been isolated from chicken caecum in Japan.
