= Parabacteroides chinchillae =

Scientific classification
- Domain: Bacteria
- Kingdom: Pseudomonadati
- Phylum: Bacteroidota
- Class: Bacteroidia
- Order: Bacteroidales
- Family: Tannerellaceae
- Genus: Parabacteroides
- Species: P. chinchillae

Binomial name
- Parabacteroides chinchillae Kitahara et al. 2013

Species of bacterium

Parabacteroides chinchillae is a Gram-negative, anaerobic and rod-shaped bacterium from the genus Parabacteroides which has been isolated from the faeces of the chinchilla (Chinchilla lanigera) in Japan.
