= Parabacteroides goldsteinii =

Scientific classification
- Domain: Bacteria
- Kingdom: Pseudomonadati
- Phylum: Bacteroidota
- Class: Bacteroidia
- Order: Bacteroidales
- Family: Tannerellaceae
- Genus: Parabacteroides
- Species: P. goldsteinii

Binomial name
- Parabacteroides goldsteinii (Song et al. 2006) Sakamoto and Benno 2006

Species of bacterium

Parabacteroides goldsteinii is a Gram-negative, obligately anaerobic bacterium belonging to the genus Parabacteroides within the phylum Bacteroidota and family Tannerellaceae. It is a commensal microorganism naturally present in the human gut microbiota and has attracted increasing scientific interests due to its potential roles in metabolic regulation, immune modulation, and host–microbe interactions.

== Morphology and characteristics ==
P. goldsteinii is a non-spore-forming, non-motile, rod-shaped bacterium. Like other members of the genus, it is strictly anaerobic and thrives in low-oxygen environments such as the gastrointestinal tract. The bacterium exhibits typical characteristics of Gram-negative cell wall architecture, including an outer membrane containing lipopolysaccharide.

== Ecology and natural habitat ==
P. goldsteinii is primarily found in the human gastrointestinal tract, where it exists as part of the normal gut microbiome in healthy individuals. Its abundance may vary depending on factors such as diet, age, metabolic status, and overall gut microbial composition.

== Biological and functional research ==
Research on P. goldsteinii has increased over the past decade, primarily through animal models, in vitro experiments, and strain-specific investigations.

=== Metabolic regulation and obesity-related research ===
A landmark study demonstrated that P. goldsteinii played a key role in the anti-obesity effects of polysaccharides derived from Hirsutella sinensis in a high-fat diet mouse model. Oral administration of P. goldsteinii was associated with reduced body weight gain, improved insulin sensitivity, enhanced intestinal barrier integrity, and increased expression of thermogenesis-related markers in adipose tissue. These effects were shown to be microbiota-dependent and strain-specific.

Subsequent research further highlighted the involvement of P. goldsteinii in diet–microbiota–host metabolic interactions. In a study investigating the effects of dietary amino acid modulation, a lysine-restricted diet was shown to ameliorate obesity and metabolic dysfunction in high-fat diet–fed mice through selective enrichment of P. goldsteinii. Metabolomic analyses identified 1,4-methylimidazoleacetic acid (MIAA) as a key microbial metabolite associated with these effects. Increased levels of MIAA correlated with reduced adiposity, improved glucose homeostasis, enhanced intestinal barrier function, and attenuation of low-grade inflammation. Mechanistically, the study suggested that MIAA acts as a signaling molecule mediating host–microbe crosstalk, contributing to improved energy metabolism and metabolic flexibility. Importantly, fecal microbiota transplantation (FMT) experiments demonstrated that the metabolic benefits of lysine restriction were transferable and microbiota-dependent, supporting a causal role for P. goldsteinii and its associated metabolites in obesity regulation.

=== Inflammation and intestinal barrier function ===
Experimental studies have investigated P. goldsteinii in models of intestinal inflammation. In a mouse colitis model, enrichment and administration of an antibiotic-resistant P. goldsteinii strain was associated with attenuation of colitis severity. Mechanistic analyses suggested involvement of valine–isobutyrate metabolism and downstream activation of PPARγ-related pathways contributing to enhanced epithelial barrier function.

Additional studies using animal models, including piglets, have reported reductions in inflammatory markers and improvements in gut barrier-related parameters following P. goldsteinii supplementation.

Beyond inflammatory bowel disease models, P. goldsteinii has also been implicated in modulating host responses to gastric pathogens. In a study investigating Helicobacter pylori–induced pathogenesis, the commensal strain P. goldsteinii MTS01 was shown to alter gut microbiota composition and significantly reduce host cholesterol levels. These changes were associated with mitigation of H. pylori–associated inflammation and tissue damage. The study suggests that cholesterol metabolism and microbiota remodeling may represent additional mechanisms through which P. goldsteinii exerts protective effects against pathogen-induced gastrointestinal disorders, extending its functional relevance beyond colonic inflammation to broader host–microbe interactions.

=== Gut–lung axis and respiratory disease models ===
P. goldsteinii has also been studied in the context of the gut–lung axis. In a cigarette smoke–induced chronic obstructive pulmonary disease (COPD) mouse model, administration of P. goldsteinii was reported to alleviate lung inflammation and metabolic dysfunction. The same study identified a lipopolysaccharide derived from P. goldsteinii that exhibited anti-inflammatory properties through modulation of Toll-like receptor 4 (TLR4) signaling.

=== Gut–brain axis and Parkinson's disease model ===
A recent report indicated P. goldsteinii colonization attenuates the progression of LRRK2-associated parkinsonism by restoring intestinal homeostasis and reducing neuroinflammation. These findings underscore the therapeutic potential of modulating the gut-immune-brain axis during the prodromal stage of Parkinson Disease.

=== Extracellular vesicles and microbial communication ===
P. goldsteinii produces extracellular vesicles(EVs), also referred to as outer membrane vesicles (OMVs). A 2023 study characterized DNA associated with purified extracellular vesicles from P. goldsteinii, suggesting non-random packaging of genetic material at the operon level.

These nanoscale vesicles contain bioactive components such as proteins, lipids, nucleic acids and glycolipids, and are believed to play importrant roles in intercellular communication between microbes and host cells.

Microbial EVs derived from NGPs are an emerging area of research, particularly in understanding how microbial signals influence host immune and metabolic responses. Recent studies have further demonstrated that OMVs derived from P. goldsteinii can modulate inflammatory responses beyond the gastrointestinal tract. In particular, P. goldsteinii-derived OMVs have been shown to suppress skin inflammation in experimental models of psoriasis by regulating immune signaling pathways involved in inflammatory responses.

These findings suggest that microbial EVs functioning as a postbiotic may contribute to the maintenance of skin homeostasis and may play a role in alleviating disease-associated skin conditions, such as psoriasis and atopic dermatitis, through immunomodulatory and anti-inflammatory mechanisms.

== Potential applications and research interests ==
Due to its presence in healthy gut microbiota and its observed biological activities in many experimental models, P. goldsteinii has become a subject of interest in next-generation probiotic (NGP) research and postbiotic science. Research focuses on understanding its safety profile, main functional components, the underlying mechanisms of action (MOA), and potential translational applications.

== Safety and regulatory status ==
Although P. goldsteinii was previously reported to be isolated from the human microbiota, however, so far there is no evidence indicating that P. goldsteinii is the causal factor initiating human diseases. To facilitate its use as a commercial food ingredient, a specific strain, P. goldsteinii RV-01, has undergone extensive safety evaluations, including animal toxicity studies. In addition to the three genotoxicity assays, 28-day subacute and 90-day subchronic animal toxicity studies were also implemented. The results of all studies were negative for toxicity. These results support the conclusion that autoclaved P. goldsteinii RV-01 is safe for use as a food ingredient.. Based on these assessments, a panel of qualified experts concluded that the autoclaved (heat-killed) form of this bacterium is safe for its intended use, granting it self-affirmed GRAS status.
