= Marinifilum breve =

Scientific classification
- Domain: Bacteria
- Kingdom: Pseudomonadati
- Phylum: Bacteroidota
- Class: Bacteroidia
- Order: Bacteroidales
- Family: Marinifilaceae
- Genus: Marinifilum
- Species: M. breve

Binomial name
- Marinifilum breve Fu et al. 2018

Type strain
- JCM 32401, KCTC 15646, MCCC 1K03477, JC075

Species of bacterium

Marinifilum breve is a Gram-negative, facultatively anaerobic, short-clavate and non-motile bacterium from the genus Marinifilum which has been from the Yongle Blue Hole from the South China Sea.
