= Draconibacterium mangrovi =

Scientific classification
- Domain: Bacteria
- Kingdom: Pseudomonadati
- Phylum: Bacteroidota
- Class: Bacteroidia
- Order: Bacteroidales
- Family: Prolixibacteraceae
- Genus: Draconibacterium
- Species: D. mangrovi

Binomial name
- Draconibacterium mangrovi Hu et al. 2020

Type strain
- GM2-18

Species of bacterium

Draconibacterium mangrovi is a Gram-negative and facultatively anaerobic bacterium from the genus Draconibacterium which has been isolated from mangrove sediment from the Luoyang River in China.
