= Saccharicrinis carchari =

Scientific classification
- Domain: Bacteria
- Kingdom: Pseudomonadati
- Phylum: Bacteroidota
- Class: Bacteroidia
- Order: Bacteroidales
- Family: Marinilabiliaceae
- Genus: Saccharicrinis
- Species: S. carchari

Binomial name
- Saccharicrinis carchari Liu et al. 2014

Type strain
- CICC 10590, DSM 27040, SS12

Species of bacterium

Saccharicrinis carchari is a Gram-negative and facultative anaerobic bacterium from the genus Saccharicrinis which has been isolated from the gill of a dead shark (Cetorhinus maximus) from the Yellow Sea in China.
