= Acetobacteroides hydrogenigenes =

Scientific classification
- Domain: Bacteria
- Kingdom: Pseudomonadati
- Phylum: Bacteroidota
- Class: Bacteroidia
- Order: Bacteroidales
- Family: Williamwhitmaniaceae
- Genus: Acetobacteroides
- Species: A. hydrogenigenes

Binomial name
- Acetobacteroides hydrogenigenes Su et al. 2014

Type strain
- CGMCC 1.5173, DSM 24657, JCM 17603, RL-C

Species of bacterium

Acetobacteroides hydrogenigenes is a Gram-negative, carbohydrate-fermenting, mesophilic, strictly anaerobic, non-spore-forming and non-motile bacterium from the genus of Acetobacteroides which has been isolated from reedswamp in Qingdao in China. Acetobacteroides hydrogenigenes produces hydrogen.
