= Geofilum rubicundum =

Scientific classification
- Domain: Bacteria
- Kingdom: Pseudomonadati
- Phylum: Bacteroidota
- Class: Bacteroidia
- Order: Bacteroidales
- Family: Marinilabiliaceae
- Genus: Geofilum
- Species: G. rubicundum

Binomial name
- Geofilum rubicundum Miyazaki et al. 2012

Type strain
- JCM 15548, NCIMB 14482, JAM-BA0501

Species of bacterium

Geofilum rubicundum is a facultatively anaerobic bacterium from the genus of Geofilum which has been isolated from deep subseafloor sediments from the Shimokita Peninsula from Japan.
