= Coprobacter fastidiosus =

Scientific classification
- Domain: Bacteria
- Kingdom: Pseudomonadati
- Phylum: Bacteroidota
- Class: Bacteroidia
- Order: Bacteroidales
- Family: Barnesiellaceae
- Genus: Coprobacter
- Species: C. fastidiosus

Binomial name
- Coprobacter fastidiosus Shkoporov et al. 2013

Type strain
- DSM 26242, NSB1, VKM B-2743

Species of bacterium

Coprobacter fastidiosus is a Gram-negative, obligately anaerobic, rod-shaped, non-spore-forming and non-motil bacterium from the genus of Coprobacter which has been isolated from the faeces of an infant in Russia.
