= Butyricimonas synergistica =

Scientific classification
- Domain: Bacteria
- Kingdom: Pseudomonadati
- Phylum: Bacteroidota
- Class: Bacteroidia
- Order: Bacteroidales
- Family: Odoribacteraceae
- Genus: Butyricimonas
- Species: B. synergistica

Binomial name
- Butyricimonas synergistica Sakamoto et al. 2009

Type strain
- CCUG 56610, JCM 15148, MT01

Species of bacterium

Butyricimonas synergistica is a bacterial species in the Butyricimonas genus which has been isolated from rat faeces.
