= Alistipes finegoldii =

Scientific classification
- Domain: Bacteria
- Kingdom: Pseudomonadati
- Phylum: Bacteroidota
- Class: Bacteroidia
- Order: Bacteroidales
- Family: Rikenellaceae
- Genus: Alistipes
- Species: A. finegoldii

Binomial name
- Alistipes finegoldii Rautio et al. 2003

Type strain
- AHN 2437, ANH 2437, CCUG 46020, CIP 107999, DSM 17242, JCM 16770, VTT E-093113T

Species of bacterium

Alistipes finegoldii is a bacterium from the genus of Alistipes which has been isolated from appendix tissue from a human from Helsinki in Finland. The species is named in honor of Sydney M. Finegold. A. finegoldii is a gram negative straight rod shaped bacterium commonly found in the human gut biome that grows anaerobically. The general size ranges from 0.8 to 2 micrometers in length with rounded ends.
