= Alistipes onderdonkii =

Scientific classification
- Domain: Bacteria
- Kingdom: Pseudomonadati
- Phylum: Bacteroidota
- Class: Bacteroidia
- Order: Bacteroidales
- Family: Rikenellaceae
- Genus: Alistipes
- Species: A. onderdonkii

Binomial name
- Alistipes onderdonkii Song et al. 2006

Type strain
- ATCC BAA-1178, CCUG 48946, DSM 19147, JCM 16771, WAL 8169

Alistipes onderdonkii is a Gram-negative, rod-shaped and anaerobic bacterium from the genus Alistipes. It was first discovered in 2006, isolated from abdominal abscess faeces and appendix tissue in the United States. It is typically part of a healthy human gut microbiota and has also been found in sheep, goats and wild mouflons.

This species was named after microbiologist Andrew. B Onderdonk to pay homage to his contribution to intestinal microbiota and anaerobic bacteria. In 2020 it was split into two sub species A. onderdonkii subsp. vulgaris and A. onderdonkii subsp. Onderdonkii.

== Description ==
- Rod shaped cells with rounded edges.
- 0.2-0.5 x 0.5 - 3 µm in size
- With 48h anaerobic incubation at 37 °C with supplementation of brucella blood agar colonies are circular, convex, entire, grey, opaque weakly b-haemolytic and 0.5-0.8mm in diameter.
- Colonies will appear black while incubated for 4 days on laked rabbit blood agar
- Under UV light (365 nm) colonies are brown with no fluorescence

== Health ==
Records of A. onderdonkii causing infection in humans is very rare, with the first report occurring in 2006. The first confirmed case by 16S RNA analysis was in February 2020 where a severe infection was caused in a 58 year old man. Resistance to the antibiotics penicillin and moxifloxacin was noted in this case, but was successfully treated with meropenem, metronidazole and surgery.

In a study on mice and A. onderonkii has been shown to be able to reduce tumour necrosis factor production, which in excessive amounts can cause damage to skin grafts, and therefore suggesting this species could be beneficial for skin graft survival.

The ability of A. onderonkii as a protective agent in radiotherapy treatment has been investigated. After radiation exposure to the intestines of mice, the administration of A. onderdonkii reduced intestinal damage and significantly improved survival.

A. onderonkii has been correlated with durable clinical benefits (a medical term for a cancer treatments ability to slow or halt disease progression typically longer than 6 months) in patients with lung cancer.
