= Parabacteroides bouchesdurhonensis =

Scientific classification
- Domain: Bacteria
- Kingdom: Pseudomonadati
- Phylum: Bacteroidota
- Class: Bacteroidia
- Order: Bacteroidales
- Family: Tannerellaceae
- Genus: Parabacteroides
- Species: P. bouchesdurhonensis

Binomial name
- Parabacteroides bouchesdurhonensis Dione et al. 2018

Type strain
- Marseille-P3763

Species of bacterium

Parabacteroides bouchesdurhonensis is a bacterium from the genus of Parabacteroides which has been isolated from human faeces.
