= Saccharicrinis fermentans =

Scientific classification
- Domain: Bacteria
- Kingdom: Pseudomonadati
- Phylum: Bacteroidota
- Class: Bacteroidia
- Order: Bacteroidales
- Family: Marinilabiliaceae
- Genus: Saccharicrinis
- Species: S. fermentans

Binomial name
- Saccharicrinis fermentans (Bachmann 1955) Yang et al. 2014

Synonyms
- Cytophaga fermentans

Species of bacterium

Saccharicrinis fermentans is a facultative anaerobic bacterium from the genus Saccharicrinis which has been isolated from marine mud.
