= Draconibacterium orientale =

Scientific classification
- Domain: Bacteria
- Kingdom: Pseudomonadati
- Phylum: Bacteroidota
- Class: Bacteroidia
- Order: Bacteroidales
- Family: Prolixibacteraceae
- Genus: Draconibacterium
- Species: D. orientale

Binomial name
- Draconibacterium orientale Du et al. 2014

Species of bacterium

Draconibacterium orientale is a Gram-negative and facultatively anaerobic bacterium from the genus Draconibacterium.
