= Marinifilum fragile =

Scientific classification
- Domain: Bacteria
- Kingdom: Pseudomonadati
- Phylum: Bacteroidota
- Class: Bacteroidia
- Order: Bacteroidales
- Family: Marinifilaceae
- Genus: Marinifilum
- Species: M. fragile

Binomial name
- Marinifilum fragile Na et al. 2009

Type strain
- CECT 7942, IMSNU 14138, JC2469, JCM 15579, KCTC 22488

Species of bacterium

Marinifilum fragile is a Gram-negative, facultatively anaerobic and moderately halophilic bacterium from the genus Marinifilum which has been isolated from tidal flat sediments from Korea.
