= Tenuifilum thalassicum =

Scientific classification
- Domain: Bacteria
- Kingdom: Pseudomonadati
- Phylum: Bacteroidota
- Class: Bacteroidia
- Order: Bacteroidales
- Family: Tenuifilaceae
- Genus: Tenuifilum
- Species: T. thalassicum

Binomial name
- Tenuifilum thalassicum Podosokorskaya et al. 2021

Type strain
- 38H-str; DSM 100343; VKM B-2964

Species of bacteria

Tenuifilum thalassicum is a species of thermophilic bacteria.
