= Alistipes inops =

Scientific classification
- Domain: Bacteria
- Kingdom: Pseudomonadati
- Phylum: Bacteroidota
- Class: Bacteroidia
- Order: Bacteroidales
- Family: Rikenellaceae
- Genus: Alistipes
- Species: A. inops

Binomial name
- Alistipes inops Shkoporov et al. 2015

Type strain
- DSM 28863, VKM B-2859, strain 627

Species of bacterium

Alistipes inops is a Gram-negative, non-spore-forming, rod-shaped, obligately anaerobic and non-motile bacterium from the genus Alistipes which has been isolated from human faeces.
