= Sunxiuqinia elliptica =

Scientific classification
- Domain: Bacteria
- Kingdom: Pseudomonadati
- Phylum: Bacteroidota
- Class: Bacteroidia
- Order: Bacteroidales
- Family: Prolixibacteraceae
- Genus: Sunxiuqinia
- Species: S. elliptica

Binomial name
- Sunxiuqinia elliptica Qu et al. 2011

Bacterium

Sunxiuqinia elliptica is a Gram-negative, aerobic and elliptical bacterium from the genus of Sunxiuqinia which has been isolated from sediments from a seashore pond which was cultivated with sea cucumbers from Jimo.
