= Parabacteroides johnsonii =

Scientific classification
- Domain: Bacteria
- Kingdom: Pseudomonadati
- Phylum: Bacteroidota
- Class: Bacteroidia
- Order: Bacteroidales
- Family: Tannerellaceae
- Genus: Parabacteroides
- Species: P. johnsonii

Binomial name
- Parabacteroides johnsonii Sakamoto et al. 2007

Type strain
- CIP 109537, DSM 18315, JCM 13406, M-165

Species of bacterium

Parabacteroides johnsonii is a Gram-negative, obligately anaerobic, non-spore-forming, rod-shaped and non-motile bacterium from the genus Parabacteroides which has been isolated from human faeces in Japan.
