= Parabacteroides merdae =

Scientific classification
- Domain: Bacteria
- Kingdom: Pseudomonadati
- Phylum: Bacteroidota
- Class: Bacteroidia
- Order: Bacteroidales
- Family: Tannerellaceae
- Genus: Parabacteroides
- Species: P. merdae

Binomial name
- Parabacteroides merdae (Johnson et al. 1986) Sakamoto and Benno 2006

Type strain
- ATCC 43184, CCUG 38734, CIP 104202, DSM 19495, JCM 9497, Moore VPI T4-1, NCTC 13052, VPI T4-1, VTT E-062953

Synonyms
- Parabacteroides merdae

Species of bacterium

Parabacteroides merdae is a Gram-negative, non-sporeforming, obligately anaerobic, rod-shaped, and non-motile bacterium from the genus Parabacteroides which has been isolated from human faeces in the United States.
