= Butyricimonas faecihominis =

Scientific classification
- Domain: Bacteria
- Kingdom: Pseudomonadati
- Phylum: Bacteroidota
- Class: Bacteroidia
- Order: Bacteroidales
- Family: Odoribacteraceae
- Genus: Butyricimonas
- Species: B. faecihominis

Binomial name
- Butyricimonas faecihominis Sakamoto et al. 2014

Type strain
- CCUG 65562, JCM 18676, strain 180-3

Species of bacterium

Butyricimonas faecihominis is a bacterial species in the Butyricimonas genus which has been isolated from human faeces.
