= Prolixibacter bellariivorans =

Scientific classification
- Domain: Bacteria
- Kingdom: Pseudomonadati
- Phylum: Bacteroidota
- Class: Bacteroidia
- Order: Bacteroidales
- Family: Prolixibacteraceae
- Genus: Prolixibacter
- Species: P. bellariivorans

Binomial name
- Prolixibacter bellariivorans Holmes et al. 2007

Type strain
- F2

Synonyms
- Prolixibacter bellariavorans

Bacterium

Prolixibacter bellariivorans is a facultatively anaerobic, rod-shaped, non-spore-forming and psychrotolerant bacterium from the genus of Prolixibacter.
