= Mangrovibacterium marinum =

Scientific classification
- Domain: Bacteria
- Kingdom: Pseudomonadati
- Phylum: Bacteroidota
- Class: Bacteroidia
- Order: Bacteroidales
- Family: Prolixibacteraceae
- Genus: Mangrovibacterium
- Species: M. marinum

Binomial name
- Mangrovibacterium marinum Wu et al. 2016

Type strain
- FA423

Synonyms
- Mangrovibacterium marina

Bacterium

Mangrovibacterium marinum is a Gram-negative, rod-shaped, facultatively anaerobic and non-motile bacterium from the genus of Mangrovibacterium which has been isolated from sediments from the coast of Weihai.
