= Sunxiuqinia faeciviva =

Scientific classification
- Domain: Bacteria
- Kingdom: Pseudomonadati
- Phylum: Bacteroidota
- Class: Bacteroidia
- Order: Bacteroidales
- Family: Prolixibacteraceae
- Genus: Sunxiuqinia
- Species: S. faeciviva

Binomial name
- Sunxiuqinia faeciviva Takai et al. 2013

Type strain
- JAM-BA0302

Bacterium

Sunxiuqinia faeciviva is a facultatively anaerobic and organoheterotrophic bacterium from the genus of Sunxiuqinia which has been isolated from deep subseafloor sediments from the Shimokita Peninsula.
