= Anaerocella delicata =

Scientific classification
- Domain: Bacteria
- Kingdom: Pseudomonadati
- Phylum: Bacteroidota
- Class: Bacteroidia
- Order: Bacteroidales
- Family: Rikenellaceae
- Genus: Anaerocella
- Species: A. delicata

Binomial name
- Anaerocella delicata Abe et al. 2013

Type strain
- DSM 23595, JCM 17049, WN081

Species of bacterium

Anaerocella delicata is a Gram-negative, non-spore-forming, anaerobic and non-motile bacterium from the genus Anaerocella which has been isolated from a methanogenic reactor of cattle waste in Hokkaido in Japan.
