= Gabonibacter timonensis =

Scientific classification
- Domain: Bacteria
- Kingdom: Pseudomonadati
- Phylum: Bacteroidota
- Class: Bacteroidia
- Order: Bacteroidales
- Family: Odoribacteraceae
- Genus: Gabonibacter
- Species: G. timonensis

Binomial name
- Gabonibacter timonensis

Type strain
- CSUR P3388, Marseille-P3388

Species of bacterium

Gabonibacter timonensis is a bacterium from the genus of Gabonibacter which has been isolated from the gut of a Pygmy woman.
