= Paludibacter propionicigenes =

Scientific classification
- Domain: Bacteria
- Kingdom: Pseudomonadati
- Phylum: Bacteroidota
- Class: Bacteroidia
- Order: Bacteroidales
- Family: Paludibacteraceae
- Genus: Paludibacter
- Species: P. propionicigenes

Binomial name
- Paludibacter propionicigenes Ueki et al. 2006

Type strain
- CCUG 53888, DSM 17365, JCM 13257, WB4

Species of bacterium

Paludibacter propionicigenes is a Gram-negative, strictly anaerobic, non-spore-forming and non-motile bacterium from the genus Paludibacter which has been isolated from rice plant residue in Yamagata on Japan. Paludibacter propionicigenes produces propionate and acetate from glucose fermentation and is classified as a saccharolytic fermenter.
