= Alistipes ihumii =

Scientific classification
- Domain: Bacteria
- Kingdom: Pseudomonadati
- Phylum: Bacteroidota
- Class: Bacteroidia
- Order: Bacteroidales
- Family: Rikenellaceae
- Genus: Alistipes
- Species: A. ihumii

Binomial name
- Alistipes ihumii Pfleiderer et al. 2017

Type strain
- CSUR P204, DSM 26107

Synonyms
- Candidatus Alistipes marseilloanorexicus

Species of bacterium

Alistipes ihumii is a Gram-negative, non-spore-forming, anaerobic and non-motile bacterium from the genus of Alistipes which has been isolated from human feces.
