= Labilibaculum filiforme =

Scientific classification
- Domain: Bacteria
- Kingdom: Pseudomonadati
- Phylum: Bacteroidota
- Class: Bacteroidia
- Order: Marinilabiliales
- Family: Marinifilaceae
- Genus: Labilibaculum
- Species: L. filiforme

Binomial name
- Labilibaculum filiforme Vandieken et al. 2019

Synonyms
- Labilibaculum filiformis

Species of bacteria

Labilibaculum filiforme is a psychrotolerant, neutrophilic, halotolerant and motil bacterium from the genus of Labilibaculum which has been isolated from sediments from the Baltic Sea.
