= Ancylomarina psychrotolerans =

Scientific classification
- Domain: Bacteria
- Kingdom: Pseudomonadati
- Phylum: Bacteroidota
- Class: Bacteroidia
- Order: Bacteroidales
- Family: Marinifilaceae
- Genus: Ancylomarina
- Species: A. psychrotolerans

Binomial name
- Ancylomarina psychrotolerans Jia et al. 2018

Species of bacteria

Ancylomarina psychrotolerans is a Gram-negative, anaerobic, non-spore-forming and non-motile bacterium from the genus Ancylomarina which has been isolated from sediments from the Fildes Peninsula in the Antarctica.
