= Alistipes shahii =

Scientific classification
- Domain: Bacteria
- Kingdom: Pseudomonadati
- Phylum: Bacteroidota
- Class: Bacteroidia
- Order: Bacteroidales
- Family: Rikenellaceae
- Genus: Alistipes
- Species: A. shahii

Binomial name
- Alistipes shahii (Song et al. 2006) Hahnke et al. 2016

Type strain
- ATCC BAA-1179, CCUG 48947, DSM 19121, JCM 16773, WAL 8301

Species of bacterium

Alistipes shahii is a Gram-negative, strictly anaerobic and rod-shaped bacterium from the genus Alistipes which has been isolated from human appendix tissue from the United States.
