= Alistipes communis =

Scientific classification
- Domain: Bacteria
- Kingdom: Pseudomonadati
- Phylum: Bacteroidota
- Class: Bacteroidia
- Order: Bacteroidales
- Family: Rikenellaceae
- Genus: Alistipes
- Species: A. communis

Binomial name
- Alistipes communis Sakamoto et al. 2020

Alistipes communis is a rod or coccobacilli shaped, gram stain negative bacteria belonging to the family Rikenellaceae. Commonly found in the human gut microbiome, it is non-spore forming and has a size of about 0.8x1.7μm. This species was first discovered in 2020, when scientists took faecal samples from humans in Tsukuba, Ibaraki in Japan. 16S rRNA gene sequencing was used to sequence the genes.

== Morphology and physiology ==
Some of the features of this species include:

- Optimum temperature for growth is 37°C but has a range of 25-37°C.
- Optimum pH of 7 with a range between pH 6.3-7.8.
- Metabolic process is glucose fermentation.
- This species can be grown on EG agar plates, with a medium composition of 20% bile.

== Health ==
A 2024 study investigated changes to human gut microbiome in relation to intense effort exercise and found A. communis to be abundant in individuals undertaking strength training during the Wingate test (a test involving resistance cycling).

A. communis was associated with favourable outcomes for melanoma treatment in a 2025 study where this species was enriched in long term survival patients after Fecal Microbiota Transplantation as a form of Immune Checkpoint Inhibitor therapy.

== Chickens ==
In 2026 a study from the Northeast Agricultural University in Harbin, China, conducted the first study of how A. communis mechanically contributed to its host. The host species was chickens. Sixty-six chicks were involved in a study investigating A. communis and the regulation of abdominal fat percentage (AFD). When A. communis was introduced to the cecum (a pouch found at the start of the large intestine) of the chickens, it caused shifts in the microbial cecum biome. A. communis was found to be involved in the metabolism of amino acid, galactose, vitamins, amino/nucleotide sugars and carbon. It was a key microbial species in regulating AFD in chickens (A. communis is associated with an increase in AFD) due to enhanced amino acid and carbohydrate metabolism.
