= Ancylomarina subtilis =

Scientific classification
- Domain: Bacteria
- Kingdom: Pseudomonadati
- Phylum: Bacteroidota
- Class: Bacteroidia
- Order: Bacteroidales
- Family: Marinifilaceae
- Genus: Ancylomarina
- Species: A. subtilis

Binomial name
- Ancylomarina subtilis Wu et al. 2016

Species of bacteria

Ancylomarina subtilis is a Gram-negative, facultatively anaerobic, moderately halophilic and non-motile bacterium from the genus Ancylomarina, which has been isolated from sediments from the coast of Weihai in China.
