= Prolixibacter denitrificans =

Scientific classification
- Domain: Bacteria
- Kingdom: Pseudomonadati
- Phylum: Bacteroidota
- Class: Bacteroidia
- Order: Bacteroidales
- Family: Prolixibacteraceae
- Genus: Prolixibacter
- Species: P. denitrificans

Binomial name
- Prolixibacter denitrificans Iino et al. 2015

Type strain
- MIC1-1

Bacterium

Prolixibacter denitrificans is a facultatively anaerobic and nitrate-reducing bacterium from the genus of Prolixibacter which has been isolated from isolated from crude oil.
