= Alistipes timonensis =

Scientific classification
- Domain: Bacteria
- Kingdom: Pseudomonadati
- Phylum: Bacteroidota
- Class: Bacteroidia
- Order: Bacteroidales
- Family: Rikenellaceae
- Genus: Alistipes
- Species: A. timonensis

Binomial name
- Alistipes timonensis Lagier et al. 2014

Type strain
- CSUR P148, DSM 25383, JC136

Species of bacterium

Alistipes timonensis is a Gram-negative and anaerobic bacterium from the genus Alistipes which has been isolated from human faeces.
