= Sunxiuqinia rutila =

Scientific classification
- Domain: Bacteria
- Kingdom: Pseudomonadati
- Phylum: Bacteroidota
- Class: Bacteroidia
- Order: Bacteroidales
- Family: Prolixibacteraceae
- Genus: Sunxiuqinia
- Species: S. rutila

Binomial name
- Sunxiuqinia rutila Yoon and Kasai 2014

Type strain
- HG677

Bacterium

Sunxiuqinia rutila is a Gram-negative, facultatively anaerobic, rod-shaped and non-motile bacterium from the genus of Sunxiuqinia which has been isolated from sediments from the Nagasuka Fishery Harbor in Japan.
