= Sunxiuqinia indica =

Scientific classification
- Domain: Bacteria
- Kingdom: Pseudomonadati
- Phylum: Bacteroidota
- Class: Bacteroidia
- Order: Bacteroidales
- Family: Prolixibacteraceae
- Genus: Sunxiuqinia
- Species: S. indica

Binomial name
- Sunxiuqinia indica Li et al. 2020

Type strain
- RC1_OXG_1F

Bacterium

Sunxiuqinia indica is a Gram-negative, facultative anaerobic, rod-shaped and non-motile bacterium from the genus of Sunxiuqinia which has been isolated from deep sea water from the Indian Ocean.
