= Maribellus sediminis =

Scientific classification
- Domain: Bacteria
- Kingdom: Pseudomonadati
- Phylum: Bacteroidota
- Class: Bacteroidia
- Order: Bacteroidales
- Family: Prolixibacteraceae
- Genus: Maribellus
- Species: M. sediminis

Binomial name
- Maribellus sediminis Huang et al. 2020

Bacterium

Maribellus sediminis is a Gram-negative, facultatively anaerobic, nitrogen-fixing and straight rod-shaped bacterium from the genus of Maribellus.
