= Saccharicrinis marinus =

Scientific classification
- Domain: Bacteria
- Kingdom: Pseudomonadati
- Phylum: Bacteroidota
- Class: Bacteroidia
- Order: Bacteroidales
- Family: Marinilabiliaceae
- Genus: Saccharicrinis
- Species: S. marinus

Binomial name
- Saccharicrinis marinus Liu et al. 2015

Type strain
- Y11, CICC 10837, KCTC 42400

Synonyms
- Labilibacter marinus (Liu et al. 2015) Lu et al. 2017

Species of bacterium

Saccharicrinis marinus is a Gram-negative, non-endospore-forming and rod-shaped bacterium from the genus Saccharicrinis which has been isolated from marine sediments from Weihai in China.
