= Parabacteroides chongii =

Scientific classification
- Domain: Bacteria
- Kingdom: Pseudomonadati
- Phylum: Bacteroidota
- Class: Bacteroidia
- Order: Bacteroidales
- Family: Tannerellaceae
- Genus: Parabacteroides
- Species: P. chongii

Binomial name
- Parabacteroides chongii Kim et al. 2019

Type strain
- YMC B3181

Species of bacterium

Parabacteroides chongii is a Gram-negative, obligate anaerobic, non-spore-forming, rod-shaped and non-motile bacterium from the genus Parabacteroides which has been isolated from blood of a person who suffered from peritonitis.
