= Mangrovibacterium lignilyticum =

Scientific classification
- Domain: Bacteria
- Kingdom: Pseudomonadati
- Phylum: Bacteroidota
- Class: Bacteroidia
- Order: Bacteroidales
- Family: Prolixibacteraceae
- Genus: Mangrovibacterium
- Species: M. lignilyticum

Binomial name
- Mangrovibacterium lignilyticum Sun et al. 2020

Type strain
- BM_7

Bacterium

Mangrovibacterium lignilyticum is a Gram-negative, rod-shaped, facultatively anaerobic and non-motile bacterium from the genus of Mangrovibacterium which has been isolated from mangrove sediments from the Jiulong River.
