= Mariniphaga anaerophila =

Scientific classification
- Domain: Bacteria
- Kingdom: Pseudomonadati
- Phylum: Bacteroidota
- Class: Bacteroidia
- Order: Bacteroidales
- Family: Prolixibacteraceae
- Genus: Mariniphaga
- Species: M. anaerophila

Binomial name
- Mariniphaga anaerophila Iino et al. 2014

Type strain
- Fu11-5

Bacterium

Mariniphaga anaerophila is a Gram-negative, facultatively aerobic, non-spore-forming, rod-shaped, mesophilic, chemoheterotrophic and non-motile bacterium from the genus of Mariniphaga which has been isolated from tidal flat sediments from the Tokyo Bay in Japan.
