= Draconibacterium filum =

Scientific classification
- Domain: Bacteria
- Kingdom: Pseudomonadati
- Phylum: Bacteroidota
- Class: Bacteroidia
- Order: Bacteroidales
- Family: Prolixibacteraceae
- Genus: Draconibacterium
- Species: D. filum

Binomial name
- Draconibacterium filum Gwak et al. 2015

Type strain
- F2

Species of bacterium

Draconibacterium filum is a Gram-negative, long-rod-shaped and facultatively anaerobic bacterium from the genus Draconibacterium which has been isolated from sediments from the coast of Korea.
