= Parabacteroides pacaensis =

Scientific classification
- Domain: Bacteria
- Kingdom: Pseudomonadati
- Phylum: Bacteroidota
- Class: Bacteroidia
- Order: Bacteroidales
- Family: Tannerellaceae
- Genus: Parabacteroides
- Species: P. pacaensis

Binomial name
- Parabacteroides pacaensis Benabdelkader et al. 2020

Species of bacterium

Parabacteroides pacaensis is a Gram-negative, anaerobic and rod-shaped bacterium from the genus of Parabacteroides.
