= Draconibacterium sediminis =

Scientific classification
- Domain: Bacteria
- Kingdom: Pseudomonadati
- Phylum: Bacteroidota
- Class: Bacteroidia
- Order: Bacteroidales
- Family: Prolixibacteraceae
- Genus: Draconibacterium
- Species: D. sediminis

Binomial name
- Draconibacterium sediminis Du et al. 2015

Type strain
- JN14CK-3

Species of bacterium

Draconibacterium sediminis is a Gram-negative, facultatively anaerobic and rod-shaped bacterium from the genus Draconibacterium which has been isolated from sediments from the Jiulong River in China.
