= Sunxiuqinia dokdonensis =

Scientific classification
- Domain: Bacteria
- Kingdom: Pseudomonadati
- Phylum: Bacteroidota
- Class: Bacteroidia
- Order: Bacteroidales
- Family: Prolixibacteraceae
- Genus: Sunxiuqinia
- Species: S. dokdonensis

Binomial name
- Sunxiuqinia dokdonensis Chang et al. 2013

Type strain
- DH1

Bacterium

Sunxiuqinia dokdonensis is a facultatively anaerobic gram-negative bacterium from the genus of Sunxiuqinia which has been isolated from deep sub-seafloor sediments from the Liancourt Rocks.
