= Marinifilum flexuosum =

Scientific classification
- Domain: Bacteria
- Kingdom: Pseudomonadati
- Phylum: Bacteroidota
- Class: Bacteroidia
- Order: Bacteroidales
- Family: Marinifilaceae
- Genus: Marinifilum
- Species: M. flexuosum

Binomial name
- Marinifilum flexuosum Ruvira et al. 2013

Type strain
- CECT 7448, DSM 21950, M30

Synonyms
- Marinifilum flexuosus

Species of bacterium

Marinifilum flexuosum is a Gram-negative, facultatively anaerobic and moderately halophilic bacterium from the genus Marinifilum which has been isolated from seawater from the Mediterranean Sea in Spain.
