= Paludibacter jiangxiensis =

Scientific classification
- Domain: Bacteria
- Kingdom: Pseudomonadati
- Phylum: Bacteroidota
- Class: Bacteroidia
- Order: Bacteroidales
- Family: Paludibacteraceae
- Genus: Paludibacter
- Species: P. jiangxiensis

Binomial name
- Paludibacter jiangxiensis Qiu et al. 2016

Type strain
- CGMCC 1.5150, JCM 17480, KCTC 5844, NM7

Synonyms
- Saccharibrevibacter jiangxiensis

Species of bacterium

Paludibacter jiangxiensis is a Gram-negative, obligately anaerobic, mesophilic, non-spore-forming and non-motile bacterium from the genus Paludibacter which has been isolated from a rice field. It produces propionate and acetate from glucose fermentation and is classified as a saccharolytic fermenter.
