= Parabacteroides timonensis =

Scientific classification
- Domain: Bacteria
- Kingdom: Pseudomonadati
- Phylum: Bacteroidota
- Class: Bacteroidia
- Order: Bacteroidales
- Family: Tannerellaceae
- Genus: Parabacteroides
- Species: P. timonensis

Binomial name
- Parabacteroides timonensis Bilen et al. 2025

Type strain
- Marseille-P3236

Species of bacterium

Parabacteroides timonensis is a Gram-negative and rod-shaped bacterium from the genus Parabacteroides which has been isolated from human faeces.
