= Marinifilum albidiflavum =

Scientific classification
- Domain: Bacteria
- Kingdom: Pseudomonadati
- Phylum: Bacteroidota
- Class: Bacteroidia
- Order: Bacteroidales
- Family: Marinifilaceae
- Genus: Marinifilum
- Species: M. albidiflavum

Binomial name
- Marinifilum albidiflavum Xu et al. 2016

Type strain
- KCTC 42591, MCCC 1H00113, FB208

Species of bacterium

Marinifilum albidiflavum is a Gram-negative and facultatively anaerobic bacterium from the genus Marinifilum which has been isolated from sediments from the coast of Weihai in China.
