= Maribellus luteus =

Scientific classification
- Domain: Bacteria
- Kingdom: Pseudomonadati
- Phylum: Bacteroidota
- Class: Bacteroidia
- Order: Bacteroidales
- Family: Prolixibacteraceae
- Genus: Maribellus
- Species: M. luteus

Binomial name
- Maribellus luteus Zhou et al. 2019

Type strain
- XSD2

Bacterium

Maribellus luteus is a Gram-negative, facultatively anaerobic and non-motile bacterium from the genus of Maribellus which has been isolated from seawater from the coast of Xiaoshi Island from China.
