= Parabacteroides massiliensis =

Scientific classification
- Domain: Bacteria
- Kingdom: Pseudomonadati
- Phylum: Bacteroidota
- Class: Bacteroidia
- Order: Bacteroidales
- Family: Tannerellaceae
- Genus: Parabacteroides
- Species: P. massiliensis

Binomial name
- Parabacteroides massiliensis Bellali et al. 2019

Type strain
- Marseille-P2231

Species of bacterium

Parabacteroides massiliensis is a bacterium from the genus of Parabacteroides which has been isolated from human faeces.
