= Mariniphaga sediminis =

Scientific classification
- Domain: Bacteria
- Kingdom: Pseudomonadati
- Phylum: Bacteroidota
- Class: Bacteroidia
- Order: Bacteroidales
- Family: Prolixibacteraceae
- Genus: Mariniphaga
- Species: M. sediminis

Binomial name
- Mariniphaga sediminis Wang et al. 2015

Type strain
- SY21

Bacterium

Mariniphaga sediminis is a Gram-negative and facultatively anaerobic bacterium from the genus of Mariniphaga which has been isolated from sediments from the coast of Weihai.
