= Parabacteroides chartae =

Scientific classification
- Domain: Bacteria
- Kingdom: Pseudomonadati
- Phylum: Bacteroidota
- Class: Bacteroidia
- Order: Bacteroidales
- Family: Tannerellaceae
- Genus: Parabacteroides
- Species: P. chartae

Binomial name
- Parabacteroides chartae Tan et al. 2012

Type strain
- DSM 24967, JCM 17797, NS31-3

Species of bacterium

Parabacteroides chartae is a Gram-negative, obligately anaerobic and non-motile bacterium from the genus Parabacteroides which has been isolated from wastewater from a paper mill in Lingqiao in China.
