= Mangrovibacterium diazotrophicum =

Scientific classification
- Domain: Bacteria
- Kingdom: Pseudomonadati
- Phylum: Bacteroidota
- Class: Bacteroidia
- Order: Bacteroidales
- Family: Prolixibacteraceae
- Genus: Mangrovibacterium
- Species: M. diazotrophicum

Binomial name
- Mangrovibacterium diazotrophicum Huang et al. 2014

Type strain
- SCSIO N0430

Synonyms
- Mangrovibacter diazotrophicus

Bacterium

Mangrovibacterium diazotrophicum is a nitrogen-fixing bacterium from the genus of Mangrovibacterium which has been isolated from mangrove sediments.
