= Alistipes putredinis =

Scientific classification
- Domain: Bacteria
- Kingdom: Pseudomonadati
- Phylum: Bacteroidota
- Class: Bacteroidia
- Order: Bacteroidales
- Family: Rikenellaceae
- Genus: Alistipes
- Species: A. putredinis

Binomial name
- Alistipes putredinis (Weinberg et al. 1937) Rautio et al. 2003

Synonyms
- "Bacillus putredinis" Weinberg et al. 1937; Bacteroides putredinis (Weinberg et al. 1937) Kelly 1957 (Approved Lists 1980)

Alistipes putredinis is a strictly anaerobic, gram-negative bacterium predominantly found in the gut of healthy individuals. It has been identified as a core species of the human gut microbiota. A. putredinis is present in more than 95% of individuals and has gotten increased attention in recent years due to its roles in host metabolism and immunity. It has been suggested that the bacterium can modulate the relationship between physical activity and body weight. On top of this, A. putredinis abundance has been consistently reduced in patients with metabolic dysfunction-associated steatotic liver disease (MASLD)). This reduction shows a negative correlation with liver fibrosis progression; A. putredinis levels decline as fibrosis severity increases.

Alistipes putredinis can be isolated from feces, abdominal and rectal abscesses, cases of acute appendicitis, foot rot in sheep, farm soil, and rarely from the human mouth.

== Cells ==
Alistipes putredinis cells are non-motile, straight or slightly curved slender rods. The cells have rounded ends, do not form spores, and usually occur alone or in pairs. A. putredinis cell dimensions are 0.3-0.5 by 0.9-3.0 μm. The bacterium's optimum temperature is 37 °C, with most strains frowing between 25-45 °C.

Cells produce fibrinolysin and indole, and are sensitive to clindamycin, cefoxitin, chloramphenicol, erythromycin and metronidazole.

== MASLD ==
After isolating A. putredinis from the feces of a healthy Chinese adult, a 2025 study describes alleviates hepatic lipid accumulation, inflammation, and gut microbiota dysbiosis in rats with MASLD. The researchers suggest A. putredinis may help ameliorate metabolic and inflammatory disturbances associated with MASLD.

Alistipes putredinis may also contribute to metabolic health by supporting gut barrier function and modulating immune responses. The bacterium also exhibits anti-inflammatory properties and was shown to alleviate inflammatory bowel disease in murine models.
