= Saccharicrinis aurantiacus =

Scientific classification
- Domain: Bacteria
- Kingdom: Pseudomonadati
- Phylum: Bacteroidota
- Class: Bacteroidia
- Order: Bacteroidales
- Family: Marinilabiliaceae
- Genus: Saccharicrinis
- Species: S. aurantiacus

Binomial name
- Saccharicrinis aurantiacus (Lu et al. 2017) García-López et al. 2020

Type strain
- KCTC 42583, HQYD1

Synonyms
- Labilibacter aurantiaca; Labilibacter aurantiacus Lu et al. 2017

Species of bacterium

Saccharicrinis aurantiacus is a Gram-negative and facultatively anaerobic bacterium from the genus Saccharicrinis which has been isolated from the sea squirt (Styela clava).
