= Alistipes indistinctus =

Scientific classification
- Domain: Bacteria
- Kingdom: Pseudomonadati
- Phylum: Bacteroidota
- Class: Bacteroidia
- Order: Bacteroidales
- Family: Rikenellaceae
- Genus: Alistipes
- Species: A. indistinctus

Binomial name
- Alistipes indistinctus Nagai et al. 2010

Type strain
- DSM 22520, JCM 16068, YIT 12060

Species of bacterium

Alistipes indistinctus is a Gram-negative, anaerobic, non-spore-forming and non-motile bacterium from the genus of Alistipes which has been isolated from human faeces from Tokyo in Japan.
