= Geofilum rhodophaeum =

Scientific classification
- Domain: Bacteria
- Kingdom: Pseudomonadati
- Phylum: Bacteroidota
- Class: Bacteroidia
- Order: Bacteroidales
- Family: Marinilabiliaceae
- Genus: Geofilum
- Species: G. rhodophaeum

Binomial name
- Geofilum rhodophaeum Mu et al. 2017

Type strain
- HF401, KCTC 42595, MCCC 1H00119

Synonyms
- Geofilum rhodophaea

Species of bacterium

Geofilum rhodophaeum is a Gram-positive and facultatively anaerobic bacterium from the genus of Geofilum which has been isolated from sediments from the coast of Weihai in China.
