= Coprobacter secundus =

Scientific classification
- Domain: Bacteria
- Kingdom: Pseudomonadati
- Phylum: Bacteroidota
- Class: Bacteroidia
- Order: Bacteroidales
- Family: Barnesiellaceae
- Genus: Coprobacter
- Species: C. secundus

Binomial name
- Coprobacter secundus Shkoporov et al. 2015

Type strain
- DSM 28864, VKM B-2857, strain 177

Species of bacterium

Coprobacter secundus is a Gram-negative, obligately anaerobic, rod-shaped and non-spore-forming bacterium from the genus of Coprobacter which has been isolated from human faeces.
