= Parabacteroides acidifaciens =

Scientific classification
- Domain: Bacteria
- Kingdom: Pseudomonadati
- Phylum: Bacteroidota
- Class: Bacteroidia
- Order: Bacteroidales
- Family: Tannerellaceae
- Genus: Parabacteroides
- Species: P. acidifaciens

Binomial name
- Parabacteroides acidifaciens Wang et al. 2019

Type strain
- 426-9

Species of bacterium

Parabacteroides acidifaciens is a Gram-negative, anaerobic, non-spore-forming, rod-shaped and non-motile bacterium from the genus Parabacteroides which has been isolated from human faeces.
