= Gabonibacter massiliensis =

Scientific classification
- Domain: Bacteria
- Kingdom: Pseudomonadati
- Phylum: Bacteroidota
- Class: Bacteroidia
- Order: Bacteroidales
- Family: Odoribacteraceae
- Genus: Gabonibacter
- Species: G. massiliensis

Binomial name
- Gabonibacter massiliensis Mourembou et al. 2016

Type strain
- CSUR P2336, DSM 101039, GM7

Species of bacterium

Gabonibacter massiliensis is a bacterium from the genus of Gabonibacter which has been isolated from the human gut microbiota.
