= Parabacteroides faecis =

Scientific classification
- Domain: Bacteria
- Kingdom: Pseudomonadati
- Phylum: Bacteroidota
- Class: Bacteroidia
- Order: Bacteroidales
- Family: Tannerellaceae
- Genus: Parabacteroides
- Species: P. faecis

Binomial name
- Parabacteroides faecis Sakamoto et al. 2015

Type strain
- CCUG 66681, JCM 18682, strain 157

Species of bacterium

Parabacteroides faecis is a bacterium from the genus Parabacteroides which has been isolated from human faeces.
