= Barnesiella intestinihominis =

Scientific classification
- Domain: Bacteria
- Kingdom: Pseudomonadati
- Phylum: Bacteroidota
- Class: Bacteroidia
- Order: Bacteroidales
- Family: Barnesiellaceae
- Genus: Barnesiella
- Species: B. intestinihominis

Binomial name
- Barnesiella intestinihominis Morotomi et al. 2008

Type strain
- DSM 21032, JCM 15079, YIT 11860

Species of bacterium

Barnesiella intestinihominis is a Gram-negative, anaerobic and non-spore-forming bacterium from the genus of Barnesiella which has been isolated from human feces in Tokyo, Japan.
