= Saccharicrinis =

Scientific classification
- Domain: Bacteria
- Kingdom: Pseudomonadati
- Phylum: Bacteroidota
- Class: Bacteroidia
- Order: Bacteroidales
- Family: Marinilabiliaceae
- Genus: Saccharicrinis; Yang et al. 2014

Type species
- Saccharicrinis fermentans

Species
- Saccharicrinis aurantiacus (Lu et al. 2017) García-López et al. 2020; Saccharicrinis carchari Liu et al. 2014; Saccharicrinis fermentans (Bachmann 1955) Yang et al. 2014; Saccharicrinis marinus Liu et al. 2015

Synonyms
- Labilibacter Lu et al. 2017

Genus of bacteria

Saccharicrinis is genus of bacteria from the family Marinilabiliaceae.
