= Anaerocella =

Scientific classification
- Domain: Bacteria
- Kingdom: Pseudomonadati
- Phylum: Bacteroidota
- Class: Bacteroidia
- Order: Bacteroidales
- Family: Rikenellaceae
- Genus: Anaerocella; Abe et al. 2013

Type species
- Anaerocella delicata

Species
- Anaerocella delicata

Genus of bacteria

Anaerocella is a bacterial genus from the family Rikenellaceae. up to now there is only one species of this genus known, Anaerocella delicata.
