= Ancylomarina =

Scientific classification
- Domain: Bacteria
- Kingdom: Pseudomonadati
- Phylum: Bacteroidota
- Class: Bacteroidia
- Order: Bacteroidales
- Family: Marinifilaceae
- Genus: Ancylomarina; Wu et al. 2016

Species
- Ancylomarina euxinus Ancylomarina longa Ancylomarina psychrotolerans Ancylomarina salipaludis Ancylomarina subtilis

Genus of bacteria

Ancylomarina is a genus of bacteria from the family Marinifilaceae.
