= Geofilum =

Scientific classification
- Domain: Bacteria
- Kingdom: Pseudomonadati
- Phylum: Bacteroidota
- Class: Bacteroidia
- Order: Bacteroidales
- Family: Marinilabiliaceae
- Genus: Geofilum; Miyazaki et al. 2012

Type species
- Geofilum rubicundum

Species
- G. rhodophaeum G. rubicundum

Genus of bacteria

Geofilum is a genus of bacteria from the family of Marinilabiliaceae.
