= Tenuifilum =

Scientific classification
- Domain: Bacteria
- Kingdom: Pseudomonadati
- Phylum: Bacteroidota
- Class: Bacteroidia
- Order: Bacteroidales
- Family: Tenuifilaceae
- Genus: Tenuifilum; Podosokorskaya et al. 2021

Type species
- Tenuifilum thalassicum Podosokorskaya et al. 2021

Species
- Tenuifilum osseticum Podosokorskaya et al. 2025; Tenuifilum thalassicum Podosokorskaya et al. 2021

Genus of bacteria

Tenuifilum is a genus of thermophilic anaerobic bacteria in the family Tenuifilaceae.
