= Puteibacter =

Scientific classification
- Domain: Bacteria
- Kingdom: Pseudomonadati
- Phylum: Bacteroidota
- Class: Bacteroidia
- Order: Bacteroidales
- Family: Prolixibacteraceae
- Genus: Puteibacter; Sun et al. 2020

Species
- P. caeruleilacunae

Bacterium

Puteibacter is a Gram-negative, short-rod-shaped, facultatively anaerobic and non-motile genus of bacteria from the family of Prolixibacteraceae with one known species (Puteibacter caeruleilacunae). Puteibacter caeruleilacuna has been isolated from the Yongle Blue Hole.
