= Labilibaculum =

Scientific classification
- Domain: Bacteria
- Kingdom: Pseudomonadati
- Phylum: Bacteroidota
- Class: Bacteroidia
- Order: Marinilabiliales
- Family: Marinifilaceae
- Genus: Labilibaculum; Vandieken et al. 2019

Species
- L. antarcticum L. euxinus L. filiforme L. manganireducens

Genus of bacteria

Labilibaculum is a genus of bacteria from the family of Marinifilaceae.
