= Thermophagus =

Scientific classification
- Domain: Bacteria
- Kingdom: Pseudomonadati
- Phylum: Bacteroidota
- Class: Bacteroidia
- Order: Bacteroidales
- Family: Marinilabiliaceae
- Genus: Thermophagus; Gao et al. 2013

Type species
- Thermophagus xiamenensis

Species
- T. xiamenensis

Genus of bacteria

Thermophagus is a moderately thermophilic and strictly anaerobic genus of bacteria from the family of Marinilabiliaceae with one known species (Thermophagus xiamenensis). Thermophagus xiamenensis has been isolated from sediments from a hot spring from Xiamen in China.
