= Prolixibacter =

Scientific classification
- Domain: Bacteria
- Kingdom: Pseudomonadati
- Phylum: Bacteroidota
- Class: Bacteroidia
- Order: Bacteroidales
- Family: Prolixibacteraceae
- Genus: Prolixibacter; Holmes et al. 2007

Species
- P. bellariivorans P. denitrificans

Bacterium

Prolixibacter is a genus of gram-negative bacteria from the family of Prolixibacteraceae.
