= Alistipes =

Scientific classification
- Domain: Bacteria
- Kingdom: Pseudomonadati
- Phylum: Bacteroidota
- Class: Bacteroidia
- Order: Bacteroidales
- Family: Rikenellaceae
- Genus: Alistipes

Type species
- Alistipes putredinis (Weinberg et al. 1937) Rautio et al. 2003

Genus of bacteria

Alistipes is a Gram-negative genus of rod-shaped anaerobic bacteria in the phylum Bacteroidota. When members of this genus colonize the human gastrointestinal (GI) tract, they provide protective effects against colitis (intestinal inflammation), and cirrhosis (liver fibrosis). However, this genus can also cause dysbiosis by contributing to anxiety, chronic fatigue syndrome, depression, and hypertension. Showcasing priority effects in microbiome assembly, when infant GI tracts have bacteria of the species Staphylococcus but not the species Faecalibacterium, Alistipes species become less capable of colonization. Alistipes, typically benign in the gut, can sometimes trigger infections like intra-abdominal abscesses and bloodstream infections, emphasizing the fine line between symbiosis and disease. This underscores the significance of comprehending their impact on human health within microbial ecosystems.

== Etymology ==
Alistipes is derived from the Neo-Latin noun alistipes, meaning "the other stick", which is further derived from the Latin adjective alius (other) and noun stipes (log/post).

== Species ==
This genus has eleven validly published species, as per the International Code of Nomenclature of Prokaryotes (ICNP):

- Alistipes communis Sakamoto et al. 2020
- Alistipes dispar Sakamoto et al. 2020
- Alistipes finegoldii Rautio et al. 2003
- Alistipes hominis Liu et al. 2022
- Alistipes ihumii Pfleiderer et al. 2017
- Alistipes indistinctus Nagai et al. 2010
- Alistipes inops Shkoporov et al. 2015
- Alistipes onderdonkii Song et al. 2006
- Alistipes putredinis (Weinberg et al. 1937) Rautio et al. 2003
- Alistipes shahii Song et al. 2006
- Alistipes timonensis Lagier et al. 2014
