= Sunxiuqinia =

Scientific classification
- Domain: Bacteria
- Kingdom: Pseudomonadati
- Phylum: Bacteroidota
- Class: Bacteroidia
- Order: Bacteroidales
- Family: Prolixibacteraceae
- Genus: Sunxiuqinia; Qu et al. 2011

Species
- S. dokdonensis S. elliptica S. faeciviva S. indica S. rutila

Bacterium

Sunxiuqinia is a genus of gram-negative bacteria from the family of Prolixibacteraceae.
