= Paludibacter =

Scientific classification
- Domain: Bacteria
- Kingdom: Pseudomonadati
- Phylum: Bacteroidota
- Class: Bacteroidia
- Order: Bacteroidales
- Family: Paludibacteraceae
- Genus: Paludibacter; Ueki et al. 2006

Type species
- Paludibacter propionicigenes Ueki et al. 2006

Species
- Paludibacter jiangxiensis Qiu et al. 2016; Paludibacter propionicigenes Ueki et al. 2006

Genus of bacteria

Paludibacter is a Gram-negative, strictly anaerobic, chemoorganotrophic and non-motile genus from the phylum Bacteroidota.
