= Mangrovibacterium =

Scientific classification
- Domain: Bacteria
- Kingdom: Pseudomonadati
- Phylum: Bacteroidota
- Class: Bacteroidia
- Order: Bacteroidales
- Family: Prolixibacteraceae
- Genus: Mangrovibacterium; Huang et al. 2014

Species
- M. diazotrophicum M. lignilyticum M. marinum

Bacterium

Mangrovibacterium is a genus of gram-negative bacteria from the family of Prolixibacteraceae.
