= Meniscus =

Meniscus may refer to:

- Meniscus (anatomy), crescent-shaped fibrocartilaginous structure that partly divides a joint cavity
- Meniscus (liquid), a curve in the upper surface of liquid contained in an object
- Meniscus (optics), a type of optical lens
- Meniscus (bacterium), a genus of bacteria
