= Parabacteroides-1 RNA motif =

Parabacteroides-1
- Consensus secondary structure and sequence conservation of Parabacteroides-1 RNA

Identifiers
- Symbol: Parabacteroides-1
- Rfam: RF03088

Other data
- RNA type: Gene; sRNA
- SO: SO:0001263
- PDB structures: PDBe

The Parabacteroides-1 RNA motif is a conserved RNA structure that was discovered by bioinformatics. Energetically stable tetraloops often occur in this motif. Parabacteroides-1 motif RNAs are found in Parabacteroides.

Parabacteroides-1 RNAs likely function in trans as small RNAs, and are immediately followed by a predicted Rho-independent transcription terminator hairpin. Based on the protein-coding genes that are nearby to Parabacteroides-1 RNAs, it is likely that at least some of these RNAs are located in prophage region.
