= Gabonibacter =

Scientific classification
- Domain: Bacteria
- Kingdom: Pseudomonadati
- Phylum: Bacteroidota
- Class: Bacteroidia
- Order: Bacteroidales
- Family: Odoribacteraceae
- Genus: Gabonibacter; Mourembou et al. 2016

Species
- G. massiliensis G. timonensis

Genus of bacteria

Gabonibacter is a genus from the family of Porphyromonadaceae which have been isolated from human sources.
