= Anaerophaga =

Scientific classification
- Domain: Bacteria
- Kingdom: Pseudomonadati
- Phylum: Bacteroidota
- Class: Bacteroidia
- Order: Bacteroidales
- Family: Marinilabiliaceae
- Genus: Anaerophaga; Denger et al. 2002

Type species
- Anaerophaga thermohalophila

Species
- A. thermohalophila

Genus of bacteria

Anaerophaga is a Gram-positive and strictly anaerobic genus of bacteria from the family of Marinilabiliaceae with one known species (Anaerophaga thermohalophila). Anaerophaga thermohalophila has been isolated from anoxic sludge from Hannover in Germany.
