= Coprobacter =

Scientific classification
- Domain: Bacteria
- Kingdom: Pseudomonadati
- Phylum: Bacteroidota
- Class: Bacteroidia
- Order: Bacteroidales
- Family: Barnesiellaceae
- Genus: Coprobacter; Shkoporov et al. 2013

Type species
- Coprobacter fastidiosus

Species
- C. fastidiosus C. secundus

Genus of bacteria

Coprobacter is a genus of gram-negative bacteria from the family of Barnesiellaceae.
