= Butyricimonas =

Scientific classification
- Domain: Bacteria
- Kingdom: Pseudomonadati
- Phylum: Bacteroidota
- Class: Bacteroidia
- Order: Bacteroidales
- Family: Odoribacteraceae
- Genus: Butyricimonas; Sakamoto et al. 2009

Type species
- Butyricimonas synergistica

Species
- B. faecalis B. faecihominis B. paravirosa B. synergistica B. virosa

Genus of bacteria

Butyricimonas is a Gram-negative and anaerobic genus of bacteria from the family of Odoribacteraceae. Bacteria in this genus are present in the gastrointestinal tract of various mammals such as rats and humans.
