= N. ehrenbergi =

N. ehrenbergi may refer to:

- Nannospalax ehrenbergi, a blind mole-rat
- Nereis ehrenbergi, a polychaete worm
