= Maribellus =

Scientific classification
- Domain: Bacteria
- Kingdom: Pseudomonadati
- Phylum: Bacteroidota
- Class: Bacteroidia
- Order: Bacteroidales
- Family: Prolixibacteraceae
- Genus: Maribellus; Zhou et al. 2019

Species
- M. luteus M. sediminis

Bacterium

Maribellus is a genus of gram-negative bacteria from the family of Prolixibacteraceae.
