= Alkalitalea =

Scientific classification
- Domain: Bacteria
- Kingdom: Pseudomonadati
- Phylum: Bacteroidota
- Class: Bacteroidia
- Order: Bacteroidales
- Family: Marinilabiliaceae
- Genus: Alkalitalea; Zhao and Chen 2012

Type species
- Alkalitalea saponilacus

Species
- A. saponilacus

Genus of bacteria

Alkalitalea is a Gram-positive and obligately anaerobic genus of bacteria from the family of Marinilabiliaceae with one known species (Alkalitalea saponilacus).Alkalitalea saponilacus has been isolated from the Soap Lake in the United States.
