= Marinifilum =

Scientific classification
- Domain: Bacteria
- Kingdom: Pseudomonadati
- Phylum: Bacteroidota
- Class: Bacteroidia
- Order: Bacteroidales
- Family: Marinifilaceae
- Genus: Marinifilum; Na et al. 2009

Species
- Marinifilum albidiflavum Marinifilum breve Marinifilum flexuosum Marinifilum fragile

Genus of bacteria

Marinifilum is a genus of bacteria from the family Marinifilaceae.
