= Parabacteroides distasonis =

Scientific classification
- Domain: Bacteria
- Kingdom: Pseudomonadati
- Phylum: Bacteroidota
- Class: Bacteroidia
- Order: Bacteroidales
- Family: Tannerellaceae
- Genus: Parabacteroides
- Species: P. distasonis

Binomial name
- Parabacteroides distasonis (Eggerth and Gagnon 1933)Sakamoto and Benno 2006

Type strain
- ATCC 8503, CCUG 4941, CIP 104284, CNCTC 5420, CNCTC An 36/93, DSM 20701, JCM 5825, KCTC 5133, LMG 28899, NCTC 11152, VTT E-062943

Synonyms
- Bacteroides fragilis subsp. distasonis; Ristella distasonis; Bacteroides distasonis>

Species of bacterium

Parabacteroides distasonis is a Gram-negative, non-sporeforming, obligately anaerobic, rod-shaped, and non-motile bacterium from the genus Parabacteroides.

P. distasonis was first discovered in 1933 and named after A. Distaso who was a Romanian bacteriologist. In 2007 scientists at Washington University in St Louis were able to complete the genome for this species for the first time and discovered it was actually 15 different species, and as of 2022 a total of 20 species have been isolated, which were all described as Parabacteroides. Since then P. distasonis has been used as the reference species to compare the other Parabacteroides species too.

== Anatomy ==
- A single cell (ATC 8503) is 0.8-1.6 x 1.2-12 μm in size
- When grown on blood agar places colonies appear 1-2mm in diameter, off white to grey in colour and circle, smooth and slightly convex.
- Can be grown on medium containing 20% bile.
- Urease negative - but can resist oxidative stress.

== Health ==
P. distasonis is a normal part of the human gut microbiome, and can be found in feces and can be spread by entering bodies of water. It can survive up to two weeks in water below 4 °C, up to 5 days at 14 °C, two days is below 24 °C and 1 day at 30 °C and so this species is used as an indicator of polluted water bodies.

P. distasonis has been associated with several health issues. Given its associated link with human health, there has been increasing research on this bacteria in recent years, providing new information to better understand the role of this bacteria in the microbiome.

P. distasonis has been associated with several health issues:

- Inflammatory Bowel Disease - how P. distasonis is related to inflammatory bowel diseases are varied across studies.
- Colorectal Cancer - there has been research suggesting P. distasonis has a positive effect on reducing the risk of intestinal tumours in colorectal cancer.
- Obesity - presence of P. distasonis in the gut may help lead to a microbiome that reduces risk of obesity.
- This bacteria may also play a role in autoimmune diseases, cardiovascular disease, alopecia areata psoriasis and gestational diabetes.

The different strains of P. distasonis may also have varying implications for health.
