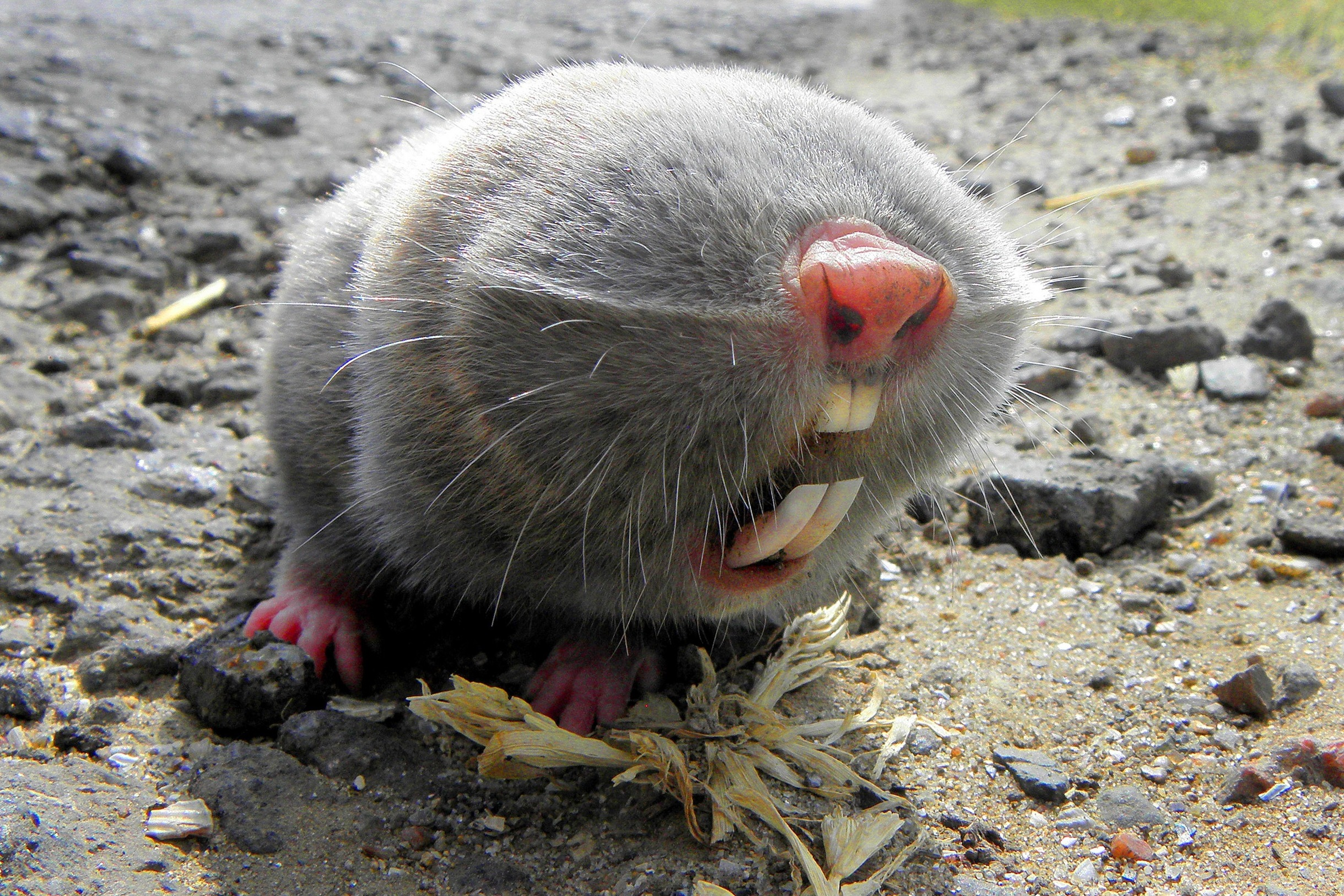

Conservation status
- Least Concern (IUCN 3.1)

Scientific classification
- Kingdom: Animalia
- Phylum: Chordata
- Class: Mammalia
- Infraclass: Placentalia
- Order: Rodentia
- Family: Spalacidae
- Genus: Nannospalax
- Species: N. leucodon

Binomial name
- Nannospalax leucodon (Nordmann, 1840)
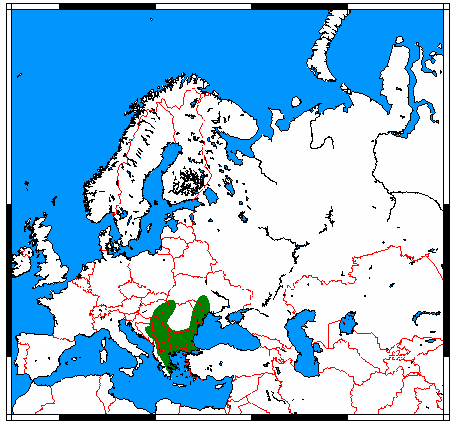

Synonyms
- Spalax leucodon Nordmann, 1840

= Lesser blind mole-rat =

Species of rodent

The lesser blind mole-rat (Nannospalax leucodon) is a species of rodent in the family Spalacidae. It is found in Albania, Bosnia and Herzegovina, Bulgaria, Croatia, Greece, Hungary, North Macedonia, Moldova, Romania, Serbia, Montenegro, Turkey, and Ukraine.

== Taxonomy ==
Prior to 2012, it was classified in the genus Spalax, but modern authors tend to separate this and some closely related mole rat species into a separate genus named Nannospalax. A study of the dentition showed that Nannospalax leucodon is a superspecies consisting of several cryptic species that can be distinguished by the caries in their teeth. According to this definition there are four separate "cariological" forms in the Carpathian Basin, one of them endangered and another one vulnerable while insufficient data are available to evaluate the conservation status of the other two forms.

== Behaviour and ecology ==
Blind mole-rats are not in fact completely blind as they do possess simple eyes 1mm in diameter and located under a layer of skin and fur. They act effectively as light meters, only sensing the level of available light.

=== Life expectancy ===
One study directed towards life expectancy used this species by virtue of its incredible longevity performance, hypoxia and hypercapnia endurance, as well as cancer resistance. Looking at the faecal and skin samples of this ideal candidate, it was found that the Muribaculaceae bacterial family, known to be linked with longevity, dominated faecal samples.

== Conservation ==
The lesser blind mole-rat was declared to be extinct in Croatia in 1984, having been present in the area of Srijem up until the 20th century, but its continued presence in Vučedol was confirmed in 2023.

== Gallery ==
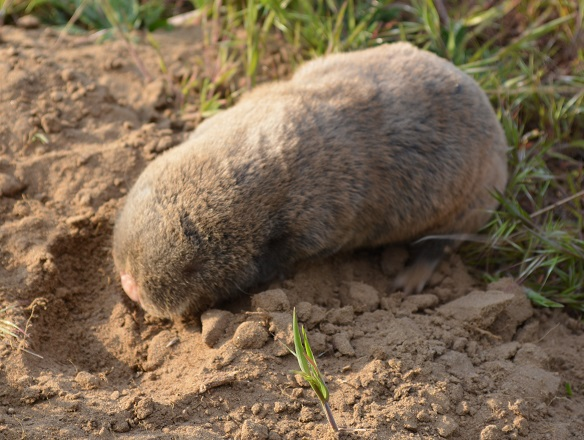
Lesser blind mole-rat in Eastern Hungary.

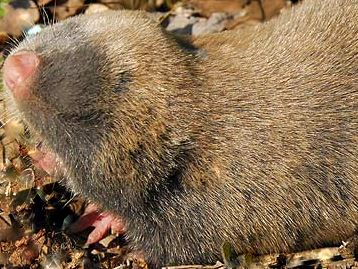
Fur close-up.
