= Odoribacter =

Odoribacteraceae

Scientific classification
- Domain: Bacteria
- Kingdom: Pseudomonadati
- Phylum: Bacteroidota
- Class: Bacteroidia
- Order: Bacteroidales
- Family: Odoribacteraceae
- Genus: Odoribacter; Hardham et al. 2008

Genus of bacteria

Odoribacter is a Gram-negative, anaerobic and non-spore-forming genus in the order of Bacteroidales.
