= Breznakibacter =

Scientific classification
- Domain: Bacteria
- Kingdom: Pseudomonadati
- Phylum: Bacteroidota
- Class: Bacteroidia
- Order: Bacteroidales
- Family: Marinilabiliaceae
- Genus: Breznakibacter; García-López et al. 2020
- Species: B. xylanolyticus

Binomial name
- Breznakibacter xylanolyticus (Haack and Breznak 1993) García-López et al. 2020

Synonyms
- Cytophaga xylanolytica Haack and Breznak 1993

Genus of bacteria

Breznakibacter xylanolyticus is a freshwater gliding bacterium that degrades insoluble particulate xylans and dominates xylan fermentation, particularly in sulfur and methane-rich environments. It is the only species in the genus Breznakibacter. At the time of isolation it was classified in the order Cytophagales on the basis of phenotypic characteristics such as polymer degradation and gliding motility. It has since been reclassified to the order Bacteroidales due to 16s rRNA genome sequence analysis.

== Growth and environment ==
Breznakibacter xylanolyticus forms orange to pink colonies when grown on xylan cultures, due to the production of carotenoids pigments. Xylans are thought to be the 2nd most abundant polysaccharides in nature, going through high amounts of turnover. In nature they are always found in complex with cellulose in plant cell walls. Because B. xylanolyticus does not grow on cellulose, it is predicted that the strain grows in community with other microorganisms capable of degrading cellulose. The mechanism of xylan degradation is poorly understood, making the enzymatic pathway of B. xylanolyticus very interesting.

== Xylan-degrading enzymes ==
Breznakibacter xylanolyticus encodes a cytoplasmic α-l-arabinofuranosidase called Arf1, which accounts for almost all the arabinofuranosidase activity in the cells. Arf1 is a trimer or tetramer of between 160 and 210 kDa. Fragments of Xylooligosaccharide that are small enough to have passed through the cytoplasmic membrane could interfere with other enzymes. Arf1 cleaves α-l-arabinofuranosyl residues from fragments present in the cytoplasm, producing arabinose from cultures such as rye, corn cob, wheat, and oat spelt arabinoxylans. Removing arabinose from the arabinoxylans allows for the oligosaccharide to be fully degraded by ENDOX enzymes, which fully degrade the xylan backbone within the cell.
