= Mariniphaga =

Scientific classification
- Domain: Bacteria
- Kingdom: Pseudomonadati
- Phylum: Bacteroidota
- Class: Bacteroidia
- Order: Bacteroidales
- Family: Prolixibacteraceae
- Genus: Mariniphaga; Iino et al. 2014

Species
- M. anaerophila M. sediminis

Bacterium

Mariniphaga is a genus of gram-negative bacteria from the family of Prolixibacteraceae.
