= Mangroviflexus =

Scientific classification
- Domain: Bacteria
- Kingdom: Pseudomonadati
- Phylum: Bacteroidota
- Class: Bacteroidia
- Order: Bacteroidales
- Family: Marinilabiliaceae
- Genus: Mangroviflexus; Zhao et al. 2012

Type species
- Mangroviflexus xiamenensis

Species
- M. xiamenensis

Genus of bacteria

Mangroviflexus is a Gram-positive, non-spore-forming, rod-shaped and obligately anaerobic genus of bacteria from the family of Marinilabiliaceae with one known species (Mangroviflexus xiamenensis). Mangroviflexus xiamenensis has been isolated from mangrove sediments from the Dongzhai Port in China.
