= Barnesiella =

Scientific classification
- Domain: Bacteria
- Kingdom: Pseudomonadati
- Phylum: Bacteroidota
- Class: Bacteroidia
- Order: Bacteroidales
- Family: Barnesiellaceae
- Genus: Barnesiella; Sakamoto et al. 2007

Type species
- Barnesiella viscericola

Species
- B. intestinihominis B. viscericola

Genus of bacteria

Barnesiella is a genus of bacteria from the family Barnesiellaceae.
