= Muribaculum =

Scientific classification
- Domain: Bacteria
- Kingdom: Pseudomonadati
- Phylum: Bacteroidota
- Class: Bacteroidia
- Order: Bacteroidales
- Family: Muribaculaceae
- Genus: Muribaculum; Lagkouvardos et al. 2016

Species
- M. intestinale

Genus of bacteria

Muribaculum is a genus from the family of Muribaculaceae (formerly Porphyromonadaceae), with one known species (Muribaculum intestinale).
