= Mucinivorans =

Scientific classification
- Domain: Bacteria
- Kingdom: Pseudomonadati
- Phylum: Bacteroidota
- Class: Bacteroidia
- Order: Bacteroidales
- Family: Rikenellaceae
- Genus: Mucinivorans; Nelson et al. 2015

Type species
- Mucinivorans hirudinis

Species
- M. hirudinis

Genus of bacteria

Mucinivorans is an anaerobic bacterial genus from the family of Rikenellaceae with one known species (Mucinivorans hirudinis). Mucinivorans hirudinis has been isolated from the digestrive tract of the leech Hirudo verbana.
