= Parabacteroides gordonii =

Scientific classification
- Domain: Bacteria
- Kingdom: Pseudomonadati
- Phylum: Bacteroidota
- Class: Bacteroidia
- Order: Bacteroidales
- Family: Tannerellaceae
- Genus: Parabacteroides
- Species: P. gordonii

Binomial name
- Parabacteroides gordonii Sakamoto et al. 2009

Type strain
- CCUG 57478, DSM 23371, JCM 15724, JCM 15725, JCM 15726

Species of bacterium

Parabacteroides gordonii is a Gram-negative, non-spore-forming, rod-shaped and non-motile bacterium from the genus Parabacteroides which has been isolated from human blood.
