= Natronoflexus =

Scientific classification
- Domain: Bacteria
- Kingdom: Pseudomonadati
- Phylum: Bacteroidota
- Class: Bacteroidia
- Order: Bacteroidales
- Family: Marinilabiliaceae
- Genus: Natronoflexus; Sorokin et al. 2012

Type species
- Natronoflexus pectinivorans

Species
- N. pectinivorans

Genus of bacteria

Natronoflexus is an obligately anaerobic and alkaliphilic genus of bacteria from the family of Marinilabiliaceae with one known species (Natronoflexus pectinivorans). Natronoflexus pectinivorans has been isolated from sediments from a soda lake from Altai in Russia.
