= Alkaliflexus =

Scientific classification
- Domain: Bacteria
- Kingdom: Pseudomonadati
- Phylum: Bacteroidota
- Class: Bacteroidia
- Order: Bacteroidales
- Family: Marinilabiliaceae
- Genus: Alkaliflexus; Zhilina et al. 2005

Type species
- A. imshenetskii

Genus of bacteria

Alkaliflexus is a genus of gram-negative bacteria in the phylum Bacteroidota (Bacteria).

== Etymology ==
The name Alkaliflexus derives from:
Neo-Latin noun alkali (from Arabic al-qalyi, the ashes of saltwort), soda ash; Latin participle adjective flexus, bent; Neo-Latin masculine gender noun Alkaliflexus, referring to life in basic surroundings and to bending/flexible cells.

== Species ==
The genus contains a single species, namely A. imshenetskii ( Zhilina et al. 2005, (Type species of the genus).; Neo-Latin genitive case masculine gender noun imshenetskii, of Imshenetskii, named after Aleksandr A. Imshenetskii (1905–1992), a microbiologist who devoted much of his research to the microbial degradation of cellulose, and gliding bacteria.)

== See also ==
- Bacterial taxonomy
- Microbiology
