= Tangfeifania =

Scientific classification
- Domain: Bacteria
- Kingdom: Pseudomonadati
- Phylum: Bacteroidota
- Class: Bacteroidia
- Order: Bacteroidales
- Family: Prolixibacteraceae
- Genus: Tangfeifania; Liu et al. 2014

Species
- T. diversioriginum

Bacterium

Tangfeifania is a Gram-negative, facultatively anaerobic and non-motile genus of bacteria from the family of Prolixibacteraceae with one known species (Tangfeifania diversioriginum). Tangfeifania diversioriginum has been isolated from the saltwater lake Gahai in China.
