= Roseimarinus =

Scientific classification
- Domain: Bacteria
- Kingdom: Pseudomonadati
- Phylum: Bacteroidota
- Class: Bacteroidia
- Order: Bacteroidales
- Family: Prolixibacteraceae
- Genus: Roseimarinus; Wu et al. 2015

Species
- R. sediminis

Bacterium

Roseimarinus is a Gram-negative, facultatively anaerobic and non-motile genus of bacteria from the family of Prolixibacteraceae with one known species (Roseimarinus sediminis). Roseimarinus sediminis has been isolated from sediments from the coast of Weihai.
