= Draconibacterium =

Scientific classification
- Domain: Bacteria
- Kingdom: Pseudomonadati
- Phylum: Bacteroidota
- Class: Bacteroidia
- Order: Bacteroidales
- Family: Prolixibacteraceae
- Genus: Draconibacterium; Du et al. 2014

Species
- Draconibacterium filum Draconibacterium mangrovi Draconibacterium orientale Draconibacterium sediminis

Genus of bacteria

Draconibacterium is a genus of facultatively anaerobic, gram-negative bacteria from the family Prolixibacteraceae.
