= Aquipluma =

Scientific classification
- Domain: Bacteria
- Kingdom: Pseudomonadati
- Phylum: Bacteroidota
- Class: Bacteroidia
- Order: Bacteroidales
- Family: Prolixibacteraceae
- Genus: Aquipluma; Watanabe et al. 2020

Species
- A. nitroreducens

Bacterium

Aquipluma is a facultatively anaerobic genus of Gram-negative bacteria from the family of Prolixibacteraceae with one known species (Aquipluma nitroreducens). A. nitroreducens was first isolated from a freshwater lake in Japan. A. nitroreducens has the ability to reduce nitrate.
