= Acetobacteroides =

Scientific classification
- Domain: Bacteria
- Kingdom: Pseudomonadati
- Phylum: Bacteroidota
- Class: Bacteroidia
- Order: Bacteroidales
- Family: Williamwhitmaniaceae
- Genus: Acetobacteroides; Su et al. 2014

Type species
- Acetobacteroides hydrogenigenes

Species
- A. hydrogenigenes

Genus of bacteria

Acetobacteroides is a bacterial genus from the family of Williamwhitmaniaceae with one known species (Acetobacteroides hydrogenigenes).
