= Salinivirga =

Scientific classification
- Domain: Bacteria
- Kingdom: Pseudomonadati
- Phylum: Bacteroidota
- Class: Bacteroidia
- Order: Bacteroidales
- Family: Salinivirgaceae; Ben Hania et al. 2017
- Genus: Salinivirga; Ben Hania et al. 2017
- Species: S. cyanobacteriivorans

Binomial name
- Salinivirga cyanobacteriivorans Ben Hania et al. 2017

Type strain
- DSM 27204; JCM 31231; KCTC 15528; L21-Spi-D4

Species of bacteria

Salinivirga cyanobacteriivorans is a species of bacteria that preys on cyanobacteria. It is the only species in the genus
