= Lentimicrobium =

Scientific classification
- Domain: Bacteria
- Kingdom: Pseudomonadati
- Phylum: Bacteroidota
- Class: Bacteroidia
- Order: Bacteroidales
- Family: Lentimicrobiaceae; Sun et al. 2016
- Genus: Lentimicrobium; Sun et al. 2016
- Species: L. saccharophilum

Binomial name
- Lentimicrobium saccharophilum Sun et al. 2016

Type strain
- DSM 100618; JCM 30898; TBC1

Species of bacteria

Lentimicrobium saccharophilum is a species of gram-negative bacteria. It is the only species in the genus Lentimicrobium and family Lentimicrobiaceae.
