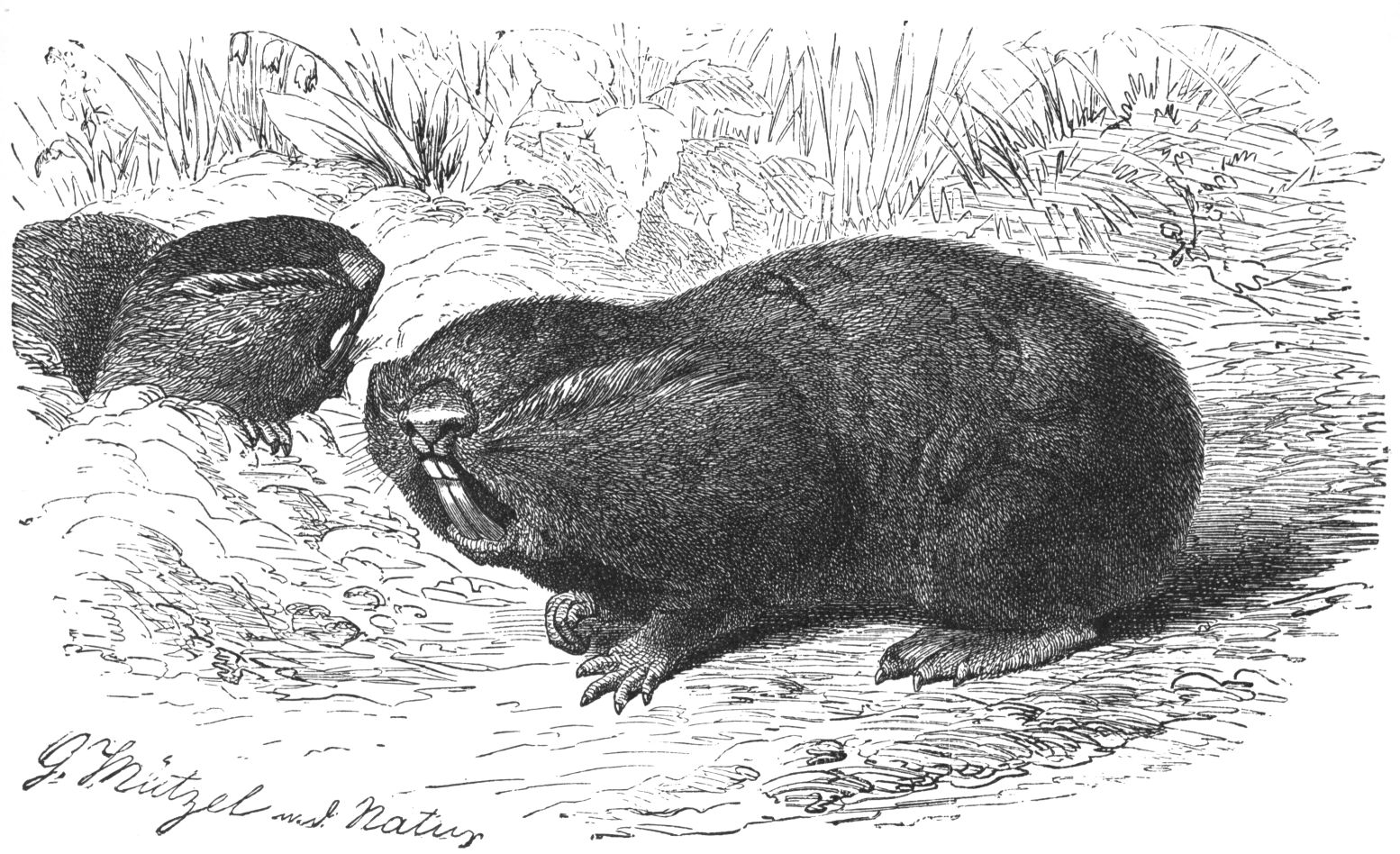

Conservation status
- Least Concern (IUCN 3.1)

Scientific classification
- Kingdom: Animalia
- Phylum: Chordata
- Class: Mammalia
- Order: Rodentia
- Family: Spalacidae
- Genus: Nannospalax
- Species: N. xanthodon

Binomial name
- Nannospalax xanthodon (Nordmann, 1840)

Synonyms
- Nannospalax nehringi (Satunin, 1898); Spalax munzuri Coşkun, 2004

= Anatolian blind mole-rat =

Species of rodent

The Anatolian blind mole-rat or Nehring's blind mole-rat (Nannospalax xanthodon) is a species of rodent in the family Spalacidae.

== Taxonomy and evolution ==
Nannospalax xanthodon was first described by Alexander von Nordmann in 1840, as Spalax typhlus xanthodon. A junior synonym, nehringi, has often been used for this species, and is sometimes used for a subspecies.

The taxonomy of the genus Nannospalax is uncertain due to low morphological variation and high chromosomal variation, making it historically difficult to identify separate species within the genus. There are three genetically distinct subpopulations within Nannospalax xanthodon, which may represent unidentified species due to the high genetic variation between them. For this reason, N. xanthodon is sometimes referred to as a "superspecies". As of 2016, 28 chromosomal "races" are known within N. xanthodon, which rarely hybridize.

== Description ==
The Anatolian blind mole-rate is a medium sized mole between 143 millimetres (5.6 in) and 248 millimetres (9.8 in) long. It weighs between 130 grams (4.6 oz) to 522 grams (18.4 oz). It is sexually dimorphic, with the males larger than the females.

== Habitat and ecology ==
It is found in Armenia, Georgia, Greece, Iran and Turkey. It is considered a species of least concern by the IUCN Red List due to its wide range. They are common in dry steppe within their range, and can be found in fields and mountains at an altitude of up to 3,000 metres (9,800 ft).

It feeds on plants that it finds while digging, such as bulbs, roots, and tubers. It stores food within its burrows, with caches up to 10 kilograms (22 lb). Its primary predators are birds, including owls and the eastern imperial eagle.

They breed once per year, with a 26 day gestational period. Females give birth to 1-6 babies of about 9 grams (0.32 oz).
