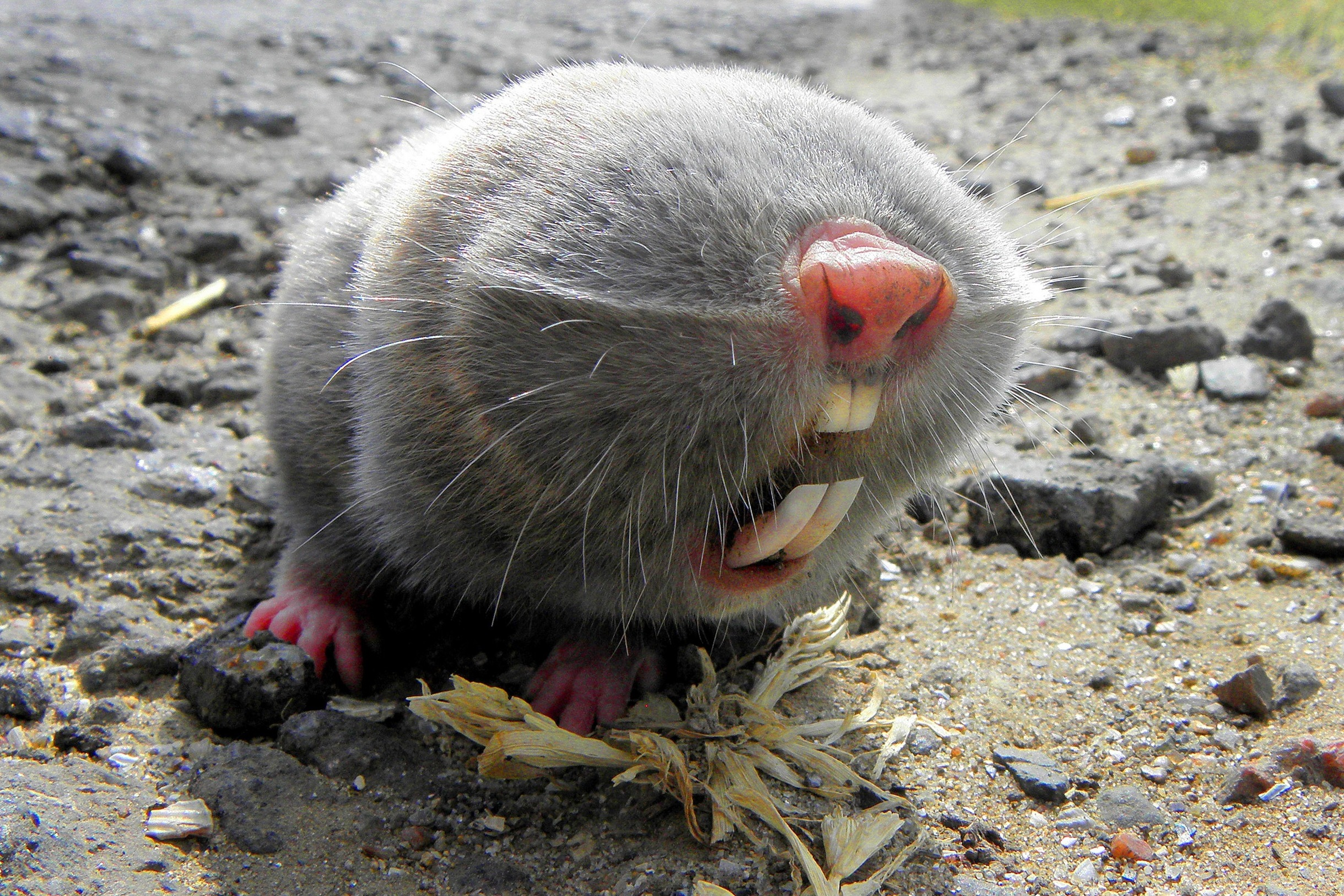
- Lesser blind mole-rat (N. leucodon)

Scientific classification
- Kingdom: Animalia
- Phylum: Chordata
- Class: Mammalia
- Order: Rodentia
- Family: Spalacidae
- Subfamily: Spalacinae
- Genus: Nannospalax; Palmer, 1903

Species
- Nannospalax ehrenbergi; Nannospalax leucodon; Nannospalax xanthodon; †Nannospalax sirakovi

= Nannospalax =

Nannospalax Temporal range: Pleistocene–Recent

Genus of rodents

Nannospalax is a genus of rodent in the family Spalacidae, found in eastern Europe and western Asia. It is one of two genera in the blind mole-rats (subfamily Spalacinae), alongside Spalax. Members of this genus are also known as small-bodied mole-rats. As with members of the genus Spalax, they are completely blind, with their eyes being entirely covered by skin.

== Taxonomy and evolution ==
Until 2013, members of this genus were grouped in Spalax, but phylogenetic analysis indicates that both diverged during the late Miocene, about 7.6 million years ago, when a marine barrier formed between Anatolia and the Balkans. It also supports two different subgenera within this genus; Nannospalax sensu stricto (containing a single species) and Mesospalax, which diverged from each other during the late Miocene or early Pliocene, after the uplift of the Anatolian Plateau.

Members of this genus are notable for their extreme chromosomal diversity, some of which may represent as-of-yet unrecognized species-level taxa. Genetic analysis indicates distinct periods of diversification among spalacids that correspond with climactic changes caused by Milankovitch cycles.

== Species ==
There are three species in this genus in two subgenera:

- Genus Nannospalax
  - †Nannospalax sirakovi
  - Subgenus Nannospalax
    - Middle East blind mole-rat or Palestine mole-rat, N. ehrenbergi
  - Subgenus Mesospalax
    - Lesser blind mole-rat, N. leucodon
    - Anatolian blind mole-rat or Nehring's blind mole-rat, N. xanthodon

Some authorities, including ITIS and Mammal Species of the World, have split out four species endemic to Israel and surrounding regions from N. ehrenbergi based on chromosomal divergence reported by the research of the Institute of Evolution at the University of Haifa:

- Mount Carmel blind mole-rat (N. carmeli)
- Golan Heights blind mole-rat (N. golani)
- Upper Galilee Mountains blind mole-rat (N. galili)
- Judean Mountains blind mole-rat (N. judaei).

However, the American Society of Mammalogists and the IUCN Red List presently group these within N. ehrenbergi due to taxonomic uncertainty.
