= Meniscus (bacterium) =

Scientific classification
- Domain: Bacteria
- Kingdom: Pseudomonadati
- Phylum: Bacteroidota
- Class: Bacteroidia
- Order: Bacteroidales
- Family: Prolixibacteraceae
- Genus: Meniscus; Irgens 1977 (Approved Lists 1980)

Species
- M. glaucopis

Bacterium

Meniscus is a Gram-negative, heterotrophic and aerotolerant genus of bacteria from the family of Prolixibacteraceae with one known species (Meniscus glaucopis).
