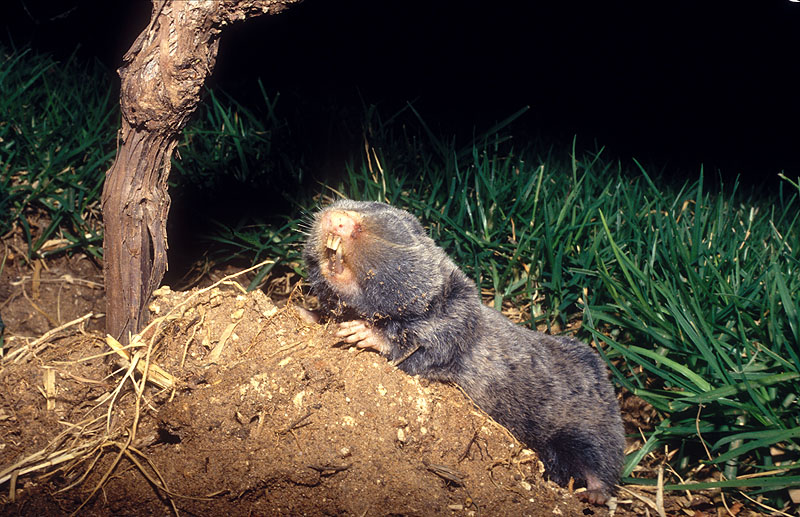

Conservation status
- Least Concern (IUCN 3.1)

Scientific classification
- Kingdom: Animalia
- Phylum: Chordata
- Class: Mammalia
- Infraclass: Placentalia
- Order: Rodentia
- Family: Spalacidae
- Genus: Nannospalax
- Species: N. ehrenbergi

Binomial name
- Nannospalax ehrenbergi (Nehring, 1898)

Synonyms
- Spalax ehrenbergi Nannospalax carmeli (Nevo, Ivanitskaya & Bailes, 2001); Nannospalax galili (Nevo, Ivanitskaya & Bailes, 2001); Nannospalax golani (Nevo, Ivanitskaya & Bailes, 2001); Nannospalax judaei (Nevo, Ivanitskaya & Bailes, 2001)

= Middle East blind mole-rat =

Species of mammal

The Middle East blind mole-rat (Nannospalax ehrenbergi), also known as the Ehrenberg's mole-rat, is a species of rodent in the family Spalacidae.

== Taxonomy ==
It was formerly classified in the genus Spalax, but more recent phylogenetic evidence supports it and two other species belonging to the genus Nannospalax. Of the three Nannospalax species, N. ehrenbergi is the only one to also belong to the subgenus Nannospalax (unless the potential species within N. ehrenbergi are also considered their own species).

The species name, ehrenbergi, honors German naturalist Christian Gottfried Ehrenberg, who conducted significant research throughout the Middle East in the 19th century.

=== Possible cryptic species ===
Cytogenetic studies have shown N. ehrenbergi in Israel may actually be a species complex containing several cryptic species with chromosome numbers 2n=52, 2n=54, 2n=58 and 2n=60. Close to the 'border line' of the niche of each subspecies there is mating between individuals from different subspecies/different 2n chromosome number. Birth of fertile offspring implies that speciation of the subspecies has not been completed.

In 2001, four new Nannospalax species (then classified within Spalax) endemic to geographical regions within Israel, Palestine and the Golan Heights were described based on chromosome divergence by a team of researchers led by Eviatar Nevo. These were:

- The Mount Carmel blind mole-rat (N. carmeli) - endemic to Mount Carmel in northern Israel, including the vicinity of Afik, Kabri, and Tzippori settlements.
- The Upper Galilee Mountains blind mole rat (N. galili) - endemic to Upper Galilee in northern Israel, including the vicinity of Kerem Ben Zimra settlement.
- The Golan Heights blind mole-rat (N. golani) - endemic to the Golan Heights, including the vicinity of Mount Hermon, Quneitra and Eliad.
- The Judean Mountains blind mole-rat (N. judaei) - endemic to the Judaean Mountains in central Israel and Palestine, including the vicinity of Kibbutz Lahav.

Although the ITIS and Mammal Species of the World still recognize these species, the American Society of Mammalogists and the IUCN Red List presently group these within N. ehrenbergi due to taxonomic uncertainty, such as lack of convincing genetic support for speciation, and the type locality of ehrenbergi itself likely falling within the range of one of these species.

== Description ==
The Middle East blind mole-rat weighs 100–200 grams (3.5–7.1 oz). It has light gray fur and four sharp teeth, two large teeth in the upper jaw and two smaller teeth in the lower jaw. It has a life span of up to 20 years and is notable for its adaptability to severe lack of oxygen. In Israel, the blind mole-rat is a major agricultural pest. It digs long tunnels up to 80 centimeters deep and stores onions and tubers in underground chambers. The exceptional ecological adaptation strategies of the blind mole-rats can be seen in their different tongue morphologies, as evidenced by their tongue papillae. The tongue papillae differ between individuals in a species to adapt to different environmental regions with variant soil characteristics and food types.

== Distribution and habitat ==
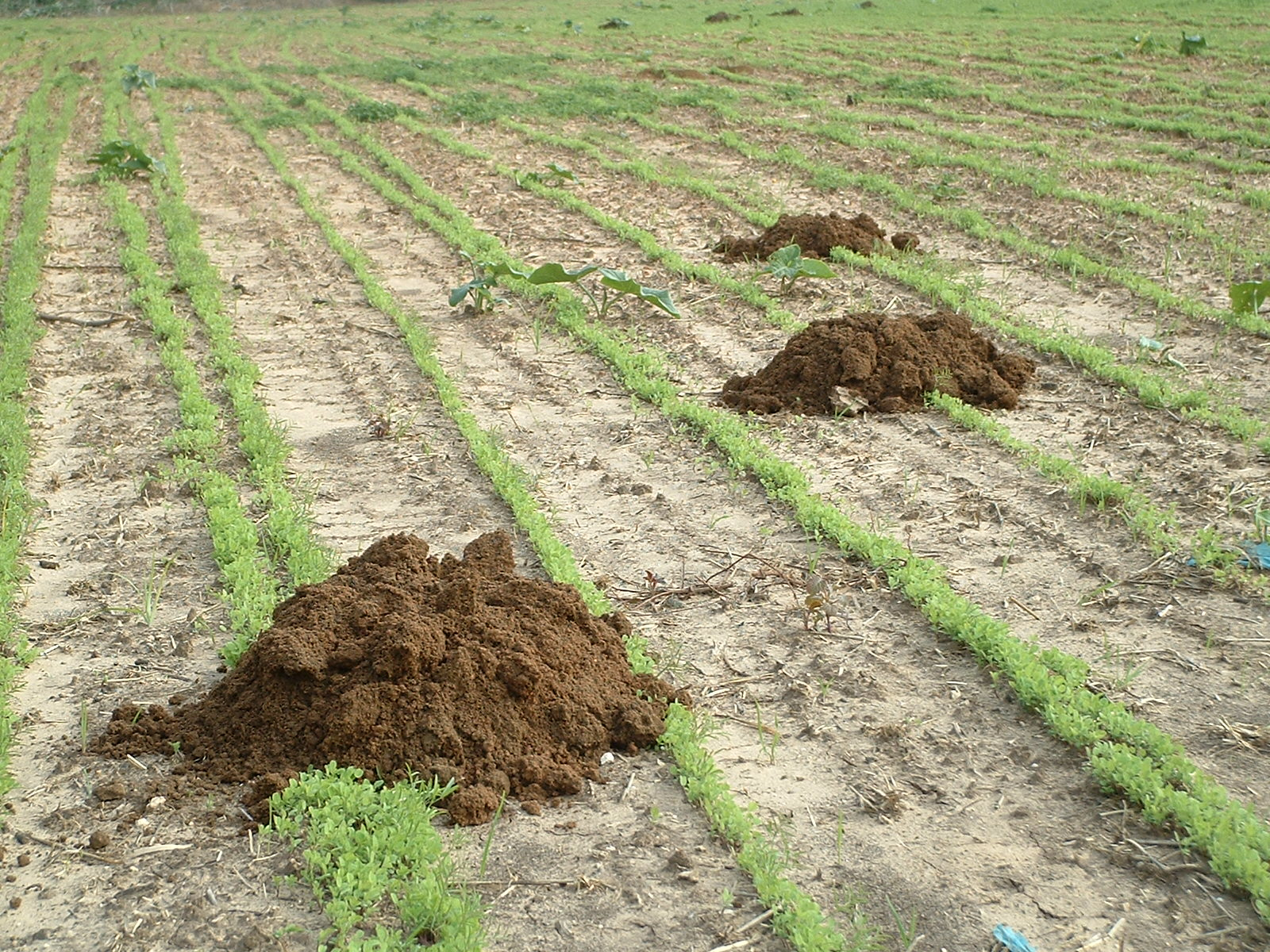
Soil mounds of the Middle East blind mole-rat in a field in Pardes Hanna-Karkur, Israel

N. ehrenbergi is found in Libya, Egypt, Iraq, Turkey and the Levant (Israel, Syria, Palestine, Jordan and Lebanon). The natural habitat of the mole is Mediterranean-type shrubbish vegetation, and it is threatened by habitat loss.

== Use in research ==
According to Israeli researchers at Haifa University, the Middle East blind mole-rat is an important lab animal for researching cancer due to its apparent resistance to the disease. In a 2013 study, data on N. ehrenbergi resistance to cancer was documented:

- No spontaneous tumors have ever been noticed in blind mole rat, based on observing thousands of individuals along half a century.
- Inducing cancer with chemical carcinogens that lead to 100% of the expected tumors in mice and rats after 2–6 months, respectively, indicate an extraordinary cancer resistance of Spalax: Only 2 out of 12 animals, and old ones (>10 years old; Spalax can live ~>20 years; 5 times longer than its evolutionary relative, the rat) developed the expected tumor with one of the carcinogens and only after 18 and 30 months.
- Nannospalax cells (fibroblasts), and only Nannospalax cells, when grown in co-culture with cancer cells from different species, including a wide range of human cancer cells, kill the cancer cells. This is also true when "feeding" the cancer cells with the medium that Nannospalax cells grew in. Identification of the secreted substance/s by Nannospalax fibroblasts and the component on cancer cells' membrane they interact with, that lead to the cancer cells' death, can open a possibility for finding a general cure to cancer.

Cancer resistance has also been noted in the two former species (N. judaei and N. golani) presently merged with this species. N. galili had its genome sequenced in 2014.

Studies on the growth of fibroblasts in vitro of N. judaei and N. golani showed that the process of necrosis replaces the role of the systematic apoptosis normally used in most organisms. Generally low-oxygen conditions, such as those common in blind mole rats' burrows, usually cause cells to undergo apoptosis. One study showed that in adaptation to a higher tendency of cell death, blind mole rats evolved a mutation in the tumor suppressor protein p53, also used in humans, to prevent cells from undergoing apoptosis. Human cancer patients have similar mutations, and blind mole rats were thought to be more susceptible to cancer because their cells cannot undergo apoptosis. However, after a specific amount of time (within 3 days according to one study), the cells in blind mole rats release interferon-beta (which the immune system normally uses to counter viruses) in response to over-proliferation of cells caused by the suppression of apoptosis. In this case, the interferon-beta triggers cells to undergo necrosis, and this mechanism also kills cancer cells in blind mole rats. Because of tumor suppression mechanisms such as this, blind mole rats and other spalacids are resistant to cancer.

The involvement of interferon in the so-called concerted cell death of Spalax cells via necrosis was highly disputed. Serious questions have been raised on the inconsistent methodology used that led to this speculation.

Observing the dirt displaced by burrowing mole rats can help archaeologists decide where to dig, since it often contains small artifacts like potsherds.

== See also ==
- Wildlife of Israel
