= Sydney M. Finegold =

American medical researcher (1921–2018)

Sydney "Sid" Martin Finegold (August 21, 1921, Far Rockaway, Queens, New York City – September 17, 2018, Los Angeles) was an American physician, medical school professor, and medical researcher, specializing in anaerobic bacteriology.

== Biography ==
Born in New York City to Russian, Jewish immigrant parents who worked as pharmacists, Sydney Finegold had a sister and an older brother. The family moved to Los Angeles in the early 1930s. Sydney Finegold graduated in 1943 from the University of California, Los Angeles (UCLA) with a bacteriology major and served from 1943 to 1945 in the US Marine Corps. After WWII ended, he matriculated at the University of Texas Medical Branch in Galveston, where he graduated in 1949 with an M.D. In 1947 he married Mary Louise Saunders, a fellow medical student. From 1949 to 1950 he was a medical intern in internal medicine at the US Public Health Service in Galveston. From 1950 to 1952 he was a resident in internal medicine at the University of Minnesota Medical School, where he was mentored by Wesley W. Spink and Wendell H. Hall. From 1951 to 1952 Finegold held his first faculty appointment at the University of Minnesota Medical School. During the Korean War he was recalled to military service. From 1952 to 1953 he was a regimental surgeon in the US Army in Japan and Korea. From 1953 to 2000 he was a physician at the Wadsworth VA Hospital, Los Angeles. During the beginning of his career there he was mentored by William L. Hewitt. From 1968 to 2000 Finegold was Professor of Medicine, Microbiology, Immunology and Molecular Genetics at the UCLA School of Medicine. From 1990 to 2000 he was the editor-in-chief of the journal Clinical Infectious Diseases (which before 1992 was named Reviews of Infectious Diseases).

Dr. Finegold was in 1963 a founding member of the Infectious Diseases Society of America (IDSA), in 1981–1982 the IDSA's president, and in 1987 the recipient of the IDSA's Alexander Fleming Award for Lifetime Achievement. In 1971 he was elected a Fellow of the American Association for the Advancement of Science. In 1999 he received the Becton-Dickinson Award in Clinical Microbiology.

He was predeceased by his first wife. They had two sons and daughters. In 1994 he married Gloria Helene Weiss. Upon his death he was survived by his three children, four grandchildren, two great-grandchildren, and a longtime companion.

== Eponyms ==
=== Genus ===
- Finegoldia

=== Species ===
- Alistipes finegoldii
