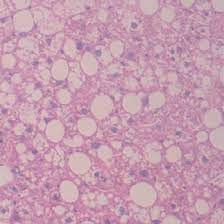
- Parabacteroides distasonis, a species of Parabacteroides within the human gut microbiome

Scientific classification
- Domain: Bacteria
- Kingdom: Pseudomonadati
- Phylum: Bacteroidota
- Class: Bacteroidia
- Order: Bacteroidales
- Family: Tannerellaceae
- Genus: Parabacteroides; Sakamoto and Benno 2006

Type species
- Parabacteroides distasonis

Species
- P. acidifaciens P. bouchesdurhonensis> P. chartae P. chinchillae P. chongii P. distasonis P. faecavium P. faecis P. goldsteinii P. gordonii P. hominis P. intestinavium P. intestinigallinarum P. intestinipullorum P. johnsonii P. massiliensis P. merdae P. pacaensis P. pekinense P. provencensis P. timonensis

= Parabacteroides =

Genus of bacteria

Parabacteroides is a Gram-negative, anaerobic, non-spore-forming genus from the family Tannerellaceae.

First isolated from fecal specimen in 1933, type strain Parabacteroides distasonis was originally classified under the name Bacteroides distasonis. The strain was re-classified to form the new genus Parabacteroides in 2006. Parabacteroides currently comprise 21 phylogenetically, ecologically, and metabolically diverse species, 11 of which are listed in the taxonomic database List of Prokaryotic names with Standing in Nomenclature (LPSN) as validly published.

Within the Parabacteroides genus, species P. distasonis and P. goldsteinii have been associated with beneficial effects in human health, relating to their integral role in gut microbiota along the digestive tract.

== Taxonomy ==
The taxon ID number used for prokaryotic genus Parabacteroides is 516255. Parent taxon comes from bacterial family Tannerellaceae, identified by number 29533 in the online LPSN database.

== Genomics ==
The genomes of Parabacteroides are highly variable, both across species and within a single strain. For example, genomes isolated from type strain P. distasonis range in size from approximately 4.5 to 5.2 Mb (megabases) and encode over 2,000 functional proteins, signifying substantial variation within the species.

== Species ==
The genus Parabacteroides comprises the following species, 11 of which are listed by the List of Prokaryotic names with Standing in Nomenclature (LPSN) as validly published:

Listed as validly published	Not listed as validly published
P. acidifaciens Wang et al. 2019; P. chartae Tan et al. 2012; P. chinchillae Kitahara et al. 2013; P. chongii Kim et al. 2019; P. distasonis (Eggerth and Gagnon 1933) Sakamoto and Benno 2006; P. faecis Sakamoto et al. 2015; P. goldsteinii (Song et al. 2006) Sakamoto and Benno 2006; P. gordonii Sakamoto et al. 2009; P. hominis Liu et al. 2022; P. johnsonii Sakamoto et al. 2007; P. merdae (Johnson et al. 1986) Sakamoto and Benno 2006	P. bouchesdurhonensis Dione et al. 2018; P. faecavium Gilroy et al. 2021; P. intestinavium Gilroy et al. 2021; P. intestinigallinarum Gilroy et al. 2021; P. intestinipullorum Gilroy et al. 2021; P. massiliensis Bellali et al. 2019; P. pacaensis Benabdelkader et al. 2020; P. pekinense Li et al. 2022; P. provencensis Benabdelkader et al. 2020; P. timonensis Bilen et al. 2019

== Role in the human gut microenvironment ==
Part of the bacterial order Bacteroidales present in the human gut, Parabacteroides are commonly found within the gut microenvironment. Parabacteroides species constitute a significant component of microbiota along the digestive tract, benefitting from a commensal relationship with the human body. Intestinal microbiota also benefit the human host, modulating essential metabolism-related processes within the gut microenvironment.

Parabacteroides distasonis and P. goldsteinii in particular form biofilms in the gut microbiota, allowing these species to survive under harsh conditions and maintain ample populations in extreme pH environments. Recent studies elucidate new applications of Parabacteroides as probiotics, supporting balanced microbiota composition as a benefit to human digestive health. Both P. distasonis and P. goldsteinii exhibit anti-obesity effects via production of secondary bile acids and succinate within the gut microenvironment. Studies on Parabacteroides species P. distasonis reveal metabolic benefits of this mechanism, including control of weight gain, decrease in hyperglycemia, and amelioration of hepatic steatosis and other metabolic diseases.
