= Muribaculum intestinale =

Scientific classification
- Domain: Bacteria
- Kingdom: Pseudomonadati
- Phylum: Bacteroidota
- Class: Bacteroidia
- Order: Bacteroidales
- Family: Muribaculaceae
- Genus: Muribaculum
- Species: M. intestinale

Binomial name
- Muribaculum intestinale Lagkouvardos et al. 2016

Type strain
- DSM 28989, KCTC 15537, YL27

Species of bacterium

Muribaculum intestinale is a strictly anaerobic bacterium from the genus of Muribaculum which has been isolated from the caecal content of a mouse in Zürich in Switzerland.
