= Balneicella =

Scientific classification
- Domain: Bacteria
- Kingdom: Pseudomonadati
- Phylum: Bacteroidota
- Class: Bacteroidia
- Order: Bacteroidales
- Family: Balneicellaceae; Fadhlaoui et al. 2016
- Genus: Balneicella; Fadhlaoui et al. 2016
- Species: B. halophila

Binomial name
- Balneicella halophila Fadhlaoui et al. 2016

Genus of bacteria

Balneicella is a gram-negative, mesophilic, anaerobic non-spore-forming and non-motile genus of bacteria with only one known species, Balneicella halophila. It is the only genus in the family Balneicellaceae.
