= Tenuifilaceae =

Scientific classification
- Domain: Bacteria
- Kingdom: Pseudomonadati
- Phylum: Bacteroidota
- Class: Bacteroidia
- Order: Bacteroidales
- Family: Tenuifilaceae; Podosokorskaya et al. 2021

Type genus
- Tenuifilum Podosokorskaya et al. 2021

Genera
- Perlabentimonas Khomyakova et al. 2022; Tenuifilum Podosokorskaya et al. 2021

Family of bacteria

Tenuifilaceae is a family of thermophilic bacteria in the order Bacteroidales.
