= Eviatar Nevo =

Israeli evolutionary biologist

- אביתר נבו
- Born: 2 February 1929 (age 97); Haifa, Mandatory Palestine
- Occupation: Evolutionary biologist
- Known for: Founder of the Institute of Evolution at University of Haifa, "Evolution Canyon" model
- Awards: Foreign Member of the Linnean Society, London (1990); Foreign Associate Member of the National Academy of Sciences, USA (2000)

Eviatar Nevo (Hebrew: אביתר נבו; born February 2, 1929, in Haifa, Mandatory Palestine), is Professor Emeritus, founder and director of the Institute of Evolution at University of Haifa, Israel.

== Research ==
Nevo received a M.Sc and PhD (1964) from Hebrew University. His Ph.D thesis was entitled "Population studies of Anurans from the lower Cretaceous of Makhtesh Ramon, Israel". He founded the Institute of Evolution at Haifa in 1973 and researches evolutionary biology, in particular, speciation processes, modifications of highly evolved traits (vision), climatic and geographic effects in sympatric speciation in insects, bacteria, fungi, mammals and crops. He is a proponent of evolutionary models where environmental stressors act positively to shape genetic polymorphisms.

In 1994, he nicknamed Mount Carmel "Evolution Canyon" and later proposed a model of the same name that acts as a global warming monitor through observing biodiversity. The EC microscale model can be used when there are two opposite slopes with contrasting climatic conditions. Studies at Mount Carmel of particular impact and interest have involved Drosophila and wild barley.

He has published more than 1000 peer-reviewed research articles on a wide array of topics about genetic diversity, evolution in action, and environmental shaping of evolutionary processes. According to Thomson Reuters, he is among the top highly cited researchers in the world.

== Awards and honors ==
He is a Foreign Member of the Linnean Society, London (1990) and of the Ukraine Academy of Sciences (1997). He is a Foreign Associate Member in Evolutionary Biology section of the National Academy of Sciences, USA (2000), an Honorary Member of the Ukraine Botanical Society (1995), of the American Society of Mammalogists (2002), and the Israel Zoological Society (2007). He received Honorary doctorates from World University (1990) and the University of Duisburg-Essen, Germany.
