= Williamwhitmaniaceae =

Scientific classification
- Domain: Bacteria
- Kingdom: Pseudomonadati
- Phylum: Bacteroidota
- Class: Bacteroidia
- Order: Bacteroidales
- Family: Williamwhitmaniaceae; Pikuta et al. 2017

Genera
- Acetobacteroides Su et al. 2014; Williamwhitmania Pikuta et al. 2017

Family of bacteria

Williamwhitmaniaceae is a family of gram-negative bacteria in the order Bacteroidales.
