= Muribaculaceae =

Scientific classification
- Domain: Bacteria
- Kingdom: Pseudomonadati
- Phylum: Bacteroidota
- Class: Bacteroidia
- Order: Bacteroidales
- Family: Muribaculaceae; Lagkouvardos et al. 2019

Genera
- "Candidatus Amyloruptor" corrig. Hinsu et al. 2019; Duncaniella Lagkouvardos et al. 2019; "Heminiphilus" Park et al. 2021; Muribaculum Lagkouvardos et al. 2016; Paramuribaculum Lagkouvardos et al. 2019; Sodaliphilus Wylensek et al. 2021

Family of bacteria

Muribaculaceae, previously known as S24-7, is a family of bacteria within the order Bacteroidales. Muribaculaceae is a prevalent and abundant bacterial component of the gut microbiome of mammals.

In 2016, family S24-7 was studied in-depth and given the name "Homeothermaceae", however, as no isolates were provided as type material, the name was not validated.

The first isolated member of this family was Muribaculum intestinale as part of the mouse intestinal bacterial collection (miBC) in 2016. However, validation of the family only occurred in 2019 after detailed analysis of this family, along with description of Duncaniella and Paramuribaculum, two additional genera within this family.

In a recent study on mice, members of the family Muribaculaceae were shown to be major utilisers of mucus-derived monosaccharides in the gut.
