= Paludibacteraceae =

Scientific classification
- Domain: Bacteria
- Kingdom: Pseudomonadati
- Phylum: Bacteroidota
- Class: Bacteroidia
- Order: Bacteroidales
- Family: Paludibacteraceae; Ormerod et al. 2022

Type genus
- Paludibacter Ueki et al. 2006

Genera
- "Candidatus Aphodosoma"; "Candidatus Colicola"; "Candidatus Colousia"; "Candidatus Enterocola"; "Candidatus Gallipaludibacter"; "Candidatus Minthenecus"; Paludibacter; "Candidatus Physcocola"

Family of bacteria

Paludibacteraceae is a family of bacteria.
