= Odoribacteraceae =

Scientific classification
- Domain: Bacteria
- Kingdom: Pseudomonadati
- Phylum: Bacteroidota
- Class: Bacteroidia
- Order: Bacteroidales
- Family: Odoribacteraceae; Munoz et al. 2016

Genera
- Butyricimonas Sakamoto et al. 2009; Gabonibacter Mourembou et al. 2017; Odoribacter Hardham et al. 2008

Family of bacteria

Odoribacteraceae is a Gram-negative, anaerobic and non-spore-forming family in the order Bacteroidales.
