= Barnesiellaceae =

Scientific classification
- Domain: Bacteria
- Kingdom: Pseudomonadati
- Phylum: Bacteroidota
- Class: Bacteroidia
- Order: Bacteroidales
- Family: Barnesiellaceae; García-López et al. 2020

Genera
- Barnesiella Sakamoto et al. 2007; Coprobacter Shkoporov et al. 2013

Synonyms
- "Barnesiellaceae" Ormerod et al. 2016

Family of bacteria

Barnesiellaceae is a family of gram-negative bacteria.
