= Marinilabiliaceae =

Scientific classification
- Domain: Bacteria
- Kingdom: Pseudomonadati
- Phylum: Bacteroidota
- Class: Bacteroidia
- Order: Bacteroidales
- Family: Marinilabiliaceae; Ludwig et al. 2012

Genera
- Alkaliflexus Zhilina et al. 2005; Alkalitalea Zhao and Chen 2012; Anaerophaga Denger et al. 2002; Breznakibacter García-López et al. 2020; Carboxylicivirga Yang et al. 2014; Geofilum Miyazaki et al. 2012; Mangroviflexus Zhao et al. 2012; Marinilabilia Nakagawa and Yamasato 1996; Natronoflexus Sorokin et al. 2012; Saccharicrinis Yang et al. 2014; Thermophagus Gao et al. 2013

Family of bacteria

Marinilabiliaceae is a family of bacteria.

== Characteristics ==
Bacterial cells that belong to the Marinilabiliaceae family are typically thin, flexible rods. Mostly species are motile by gliding motily. They are saccharolytic and need NaCl for growing.

== Metabolism ==
All species of Marinilabiliaceae are heterotrophic, they do not perform photosynthesis. The genera Alkaliflexus and Anaerophaga as well as some other genera have a strictly fermentative metabolism. Marinilabilia is facultatively anaerobic. It has respiratory and fermentative types of metabolism.
