= Marinifilaceae =

Scientific classification
- Domain: Bacteria
- Kingdom: Pseudomonadati
- Phylum: Bacteroidota
- Class: Bacteroidia
- Order: Bacteroidales
- Family: Marinifilaceae; Iino et al. 2014

Genera
- Ancylomarina Wu et al. 2016; Labilibaculum Vandieken et al. 2019; Marinifilum Na et al. 2009

Family of bacteria

Marinifilaceae is a family in the order Bacteroidales.
