= Rikenellaceae =

Scientific classification
- Domain: Bacteria
- Kingdom: Pseudomonadati
- Phylum: Bacteroidota
- Class: Bacteroidia
- Order: Bacteroidales
- Family: Rikenellaceae; Krieg et al. 2012

Genera
- Alistipes Rautio et al. 2003; Anaerocella Abe et al. 2013; Gallalistipes Zenner et al. 2021; Mucinivorans Nelson et al. 2015; Rikenella Collins et al. 1985

Family of bacteria

Rikenellaceae is a family of Gram-negative bacteria described by Noel R. Krieg in 2015. It contains nine genera, five of which are validly published by the International Code of Nomenclature of Prokaryotes. Bacteria with 16S ribosomal RNA highly similar to the Rikenella genus, as compared to the larger taxonomic order Bacteroidales, are classified in this family.

This family consists of non-motile, rod-shaped bacteria that are tolerant of bile. Most Rikenellaceae species have been identified in the gastrointestinal tract microbiomes of various animals.

Bacteria of this taxonomic family are elevated in the gut microbiomes of mice that are leptin-resistant obese and diabetic. However, Rikenellaceae bacteria are depleted in the gut microbiomes of obese American adults, leading to reduced synthesis of butyrate and disrupted metabolism.

Gut microbiomes with elevated levels of Rikenellaceae bacteria are associated with lupus and Alzheimer's disease in mice and colorectal cancer in humans.
