= Tannerellaceae =

Scientific classification
- Domain: Bacteria
- Kingdom: Pseudomonadati
- Phylum: Bacteroidota
- Class: Bacteroidia
- Order: Bacteroidales
- Family: Tannerellaceae; Ormerod et al. 2022

Genera
- Parabacteroides Sakamoto and Benno 2006; Tannerella Sakamoto et al. 2002

Family of bacteria

Tannerellaceae is a family of bacteria.
