= Prolixibacteraceae =

Scientific classification
- Domain: Bacteria
- Kingdom: Pseudomonadati
- Phylum: Bacteroidota
- Class: Bacteroidia
- Order: Bacteroidales
- Family: Prolixibacteraceae; Huang et al. 2014

Genera
- Aquipluma Watanabe et al. 2020; Draconibacterium Du et al. 2014; Gaoshiqia Yu et al. 2023; Mangrovibacterium Huang et al. 2014; Maribellus Zhou et al. 2019; Mariniphaga Iino et al. 2014; Meniscus Irgens 1977 (Approved Lists 1980); Prolixibacter Holmes et al. 2007; Puteibacter Sun et al. 2020; Roseimarinus Wu et al. 2015; Sunxiuqinia Qu et al. 2011; Tangfeifania Liu et al. 2014

Synonyms
- Draconibacteriaceae Du et al. 2014

Family of bacteria

Prolixibacteraceae is a family of 12 bacterial genera in the order Bacteroidales.
