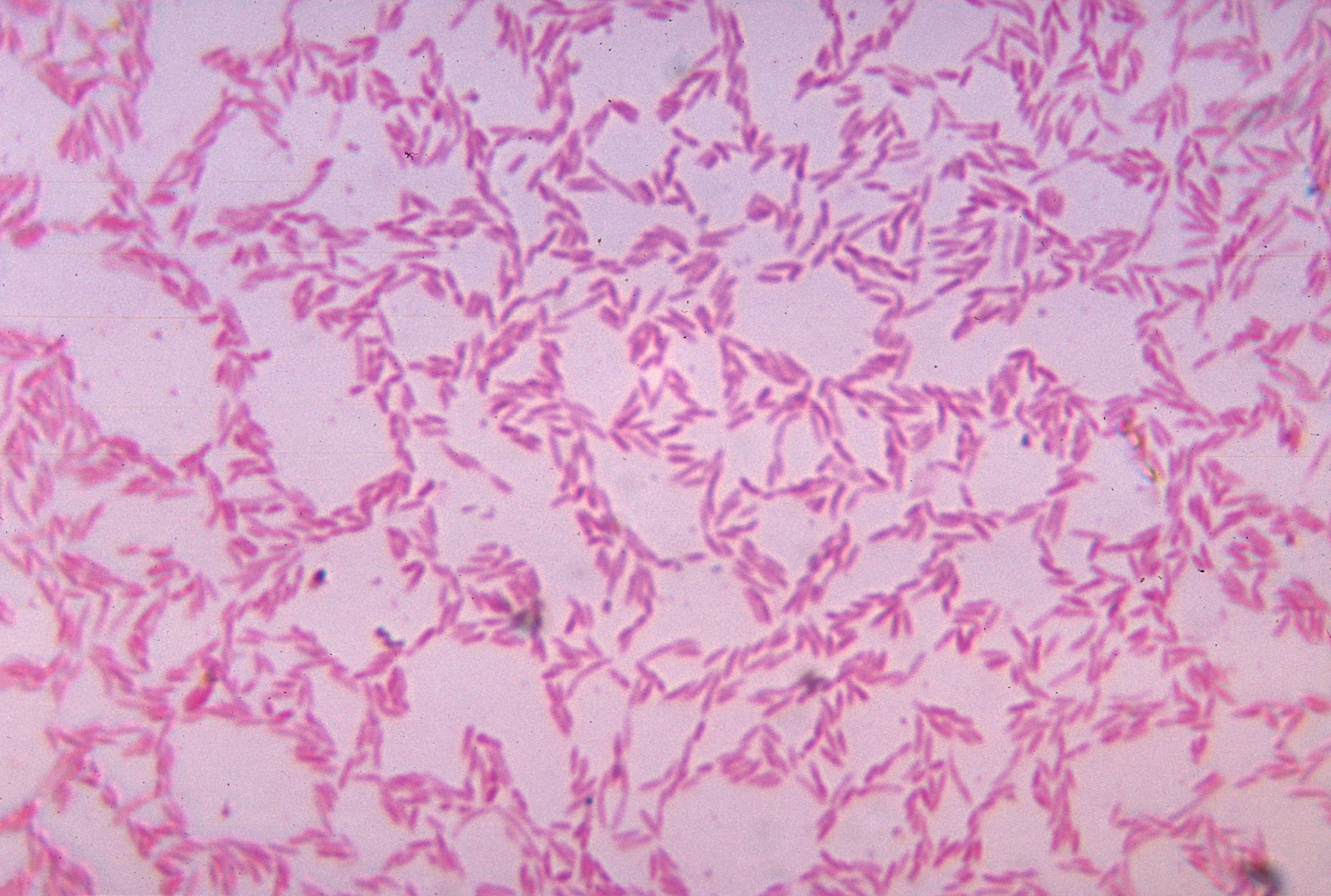
- Bacteroides biacutis anaerobically cultured in blood agar medium

Scientific classification
- Domain: Bacteria
- Kingdom: Pseudomonadati
- Phylum: Bacteroidota
- Class: Bacteroidia; Krieg 2012
- Order: Bacteroidales; Krieg 2012

Families
- "Aminobacteroidaceae" Mei et al. 2020; Bacteroidaceae; Balneicellaceae Fadhlaoui et al. 2016; Barnesiellaceae; Dysgonomonadaceae; Draconibacteriaceae Du et al. 2014; Lentimicrobiaceae; Marinifilaceae; Marinilabiliaceae; Muribaculaceae; Odoribacteraceae Munoz et al. 2016; Paludibacteraceae Ormerod et al. 2022; Porphyromonadaceae; Prevotellaceae Krieg 2012; Prolixibacteraceae Huang et al. 2018; Quyinboaceae Song et al. 2014; Rikenellaceae; Salinarimonadaceae Cole et al. 2018; Salinivirgaceae; Tannerellaceae; Tenuifilaceae; Williamwhitmaniaceae; Genera not assigned to a family; "Ca. Armantifilum"; "Ca. Ordinivivax"; "Ca. Paraporphyromonas"

Synonyms
- Bacteroidia: "Bacteroidetia" Cavalier-Smith 2020; Bacteroidales: Marinilabiliales Wu et al. 2016

= Bacteroidales =

Order of bacteria

Bacteroidales is an order of bacteria. Notably it includes the genera Prevotella and Bacteroides, which are commonly found in the human gut microbiota.

== Phylogeny ==
The currently accepted taxonomy is based on the List of Prokaryotic names with Standing in Nomenclature and National Center for Biotechnology Information (NCBI).

Whole-genome based phylogeny

- Bacteroidales
  - - - Odoribacteraceae
      - - Williamwhitmaniaceae
        - Rikenellaceae
    - - Lentimicrobiaceae
      - - Salinivirgaceae
        - - Prolixibacteraceae
          - - - Balneicellaceae
              - Marinifilaceae
            - Marinilabiliaceae
  - - Porphyromonadaceae
    - - - Paludibacteraceae
        - Dysgonomonadaceae
      - - Tannerellaceae
        - - - Muribaculaceae
            - Barnesiellaceae
          - - Prevotellaceae
            - Bacteroidaceae

16S rRNA based LTP_12_2021

- - Lentimicrobiaceae
  - - Rikenellaceae
    - - - Balneicellaceae
        - - - Marinilabiliaceae 2
            - - Marinilabiliaceae
              - - Salinivirgaceae
                - Odoribacteraceae
          - - Marinifilaceae
            - Prolixibacteraceae
      - - - Williamwhitmaniaceae
          - - Acetobacteroides
            - Tenuifilaceae
        - - - "Coprobacteraceae"
            - - Barnesiellaceae
              - Muribaculaceae
          - - - Tannerellaceae 2
              - - Tannerellaceae
                - Porphyromonadaceae
            - - - Paludibacteraceae
                - Dysgonomonadaceae
              - Bacteroidaceae

GTDB 07-RS207 by Genome Taxonomy Database

- - - P3
    - - "Ca. Limimorpha" Gilroy et al. 2021
      - Lentimicrobiaceae Sun et al. 2016
  - - - - "Bacteroides periocalifornicus"
        - Tenuifilaceae Podosokorskaya et al. 2021
      - - Williamwhitmaniaceae Pikuta et al. 2017
        - - UBA932
          - - Acetobacteroides Su et al. 2014
            - Rikenellaceae Krieg et al. 2012
    - - Salinivirgaceae Ben Hania et al. 2017
      - - Prolixibacteraceae Huang et al. 2014 (incl. Draconibacteriaceae)
        - - Marinifilaceae Iino et al. 2014 (incl. Balneicellaceae; Odoribacteraceae)
          - - Marinilabiliaceae Ludwig et al. 2012
            - - PaludibacteraceaeOrmerod et al. 2022
              - - - - Porphyromonadaceae Krieg 2012
                    - Tannerellaceae Ormerod et al. 2022
                  - - "Azobacteroidaceae"
                    - Dysgonomonadaceae García-López et al. 2020
                - - - - - "Ca. Gallibacteroides" Gilroy et al. 2021
                        - "Coprobacteraceae"
                      - "Ca. Caccoplasma" Gilroy et al. 2021
                    - - Barnesiellaceae García-López et al. 2020
                      - Muribaculaceae Lagkouvardos et al. 2019 (incl. "Homeothermaceae")
                  - Bacteroidaceae Pribram 1933 (incl. Prevotellaceae)
