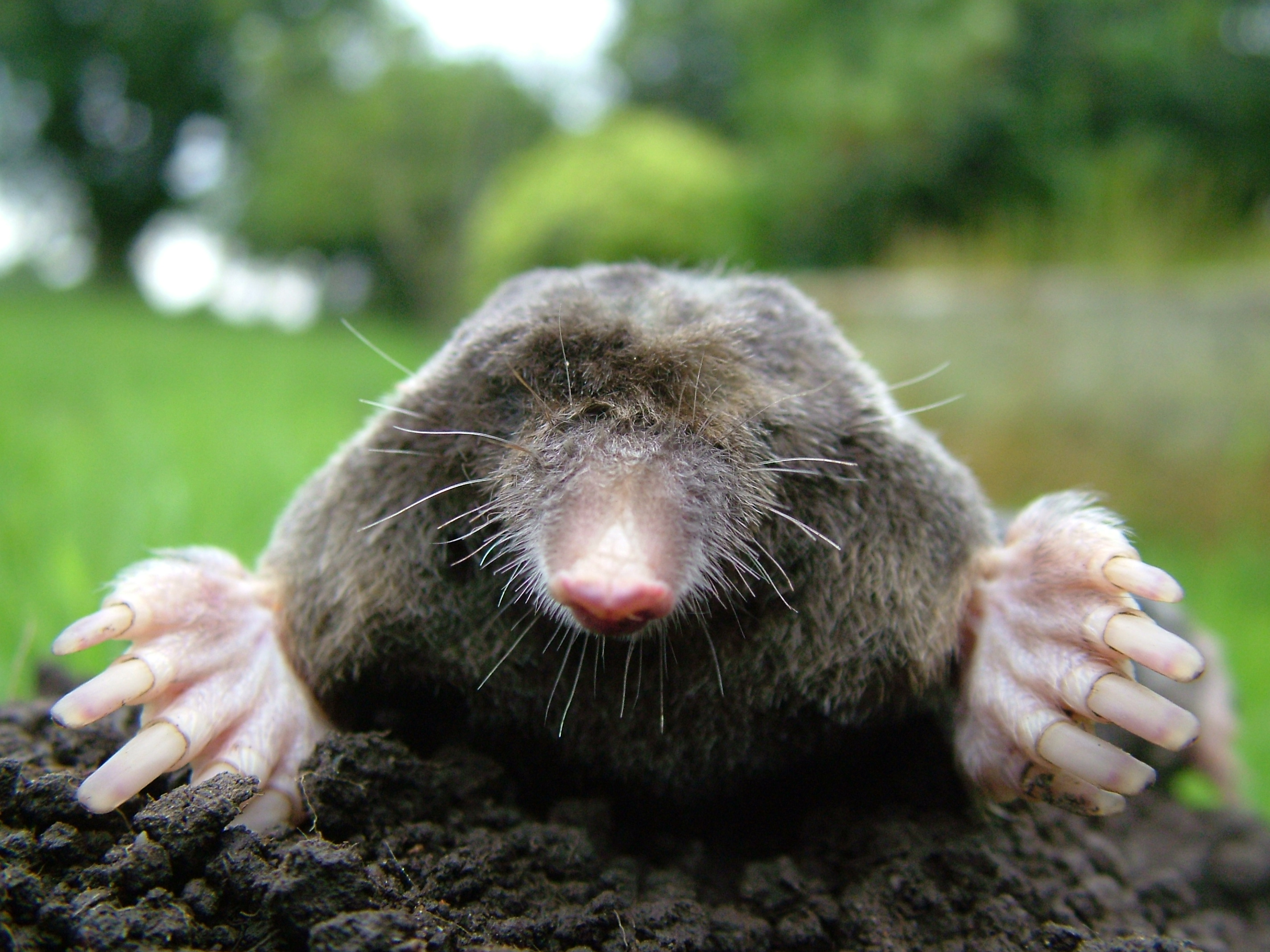
- European mole (Talpa europaea)

Scientific classification
- Kingdom: Animalia
- Phylum: Chordata
- Class: Mammalia
- Order: Eulipotyphla
- Family: Talpidae
- Subfamily: Talpinae
- Tribe: Talpini; Fischer, 1814

Genera
- Euroscaptor; Mogera; Oreoscaptor; Parascaptor; Scaptochirus; Talpa

= Talpini =

Tribe of mammals

Talpini is a tribe of mammals known as Old World moles. It is a division of the subfamily Talpinae.

This tribe contains the following genera and species:

- Tribe Talpini
  - Genus Euroscaptor
    - Greater Chinese mole, E. grandis
    - Kloss's mole, E. klossi
    - Kuznetsov's mole, E. kuznetsovi
    - Long-nosed mole, E. longirostris
    - Malaysian mole, E. malayanus
    - Himalayan mole, E. micrurus
    - Ngoc Linh mole, E. ngoclinhensis
    - Orlov's mole, E. orlovi
    - Small-toothed mole, E. parvidens
    - Vietnamese mole, E. subanura
  - Genus Mogera
    - Echigo mole, M. etigo
    - Small Japanese mole, M. imaizumii
    - Insular mole, M. insularis
    - Kano's mole, M. kanoana
    - La Touche's mole, M. latouchei
    - Ussuri mole, M. robusta
    - Sado mole, M. tokudae
    - Senkaku mole, M. uchidai
    - Japanese mole, M. wogura
  - Genus Oreoscaptor
    - Japanese mountain mole, O. mizura
  - Genus Parascaptor
    - White-tailed mole, P. leucura
  - Genus Scaptochirus - China
    - Short-faced mole, S. moschatus
  - Genus Talpa
    - Altai mole, T. altaica
    - Aquitanian mole, T. aquitania
    - Blind mole, T. caeca
    - Caucasian mole, T. caucasica
    - Père David's mole, T. davidiana
    - European mole, T. europaea
    - Levant mole, T. levantis
    - Martino's mole, T. martinorum
    - Spanish mole, T. occidentalis
    - Ognev's mole, T. ognevi
    - Roman mole, T. romana
    - Balkan mole, T. stankovici
    - Talysch mole, T. talyschensis
