= List of mammals of Albania =

This list shows the IUCN Red List status of the 58 mammal species occurring in Albania. This list is derived from the IUCN Red List which lists species of mammals and includes those mammals that have recently been classified as extinct (since 1500 AD).

Icons which state each species' global IUCN status:
VU	Vulnerable	Facing a high risk of extinction in the wild
NT	Near Threatened	Doesn't meet any criteria that would categorise it as risking extinction but likely to in the future
LC	Least Concern	No current identifiable risks to this species
DD	Data Deficient	Inadequate information to make an assessment of the risks to this species

== Order: Artiodactyla (even-toed ungulates) ==
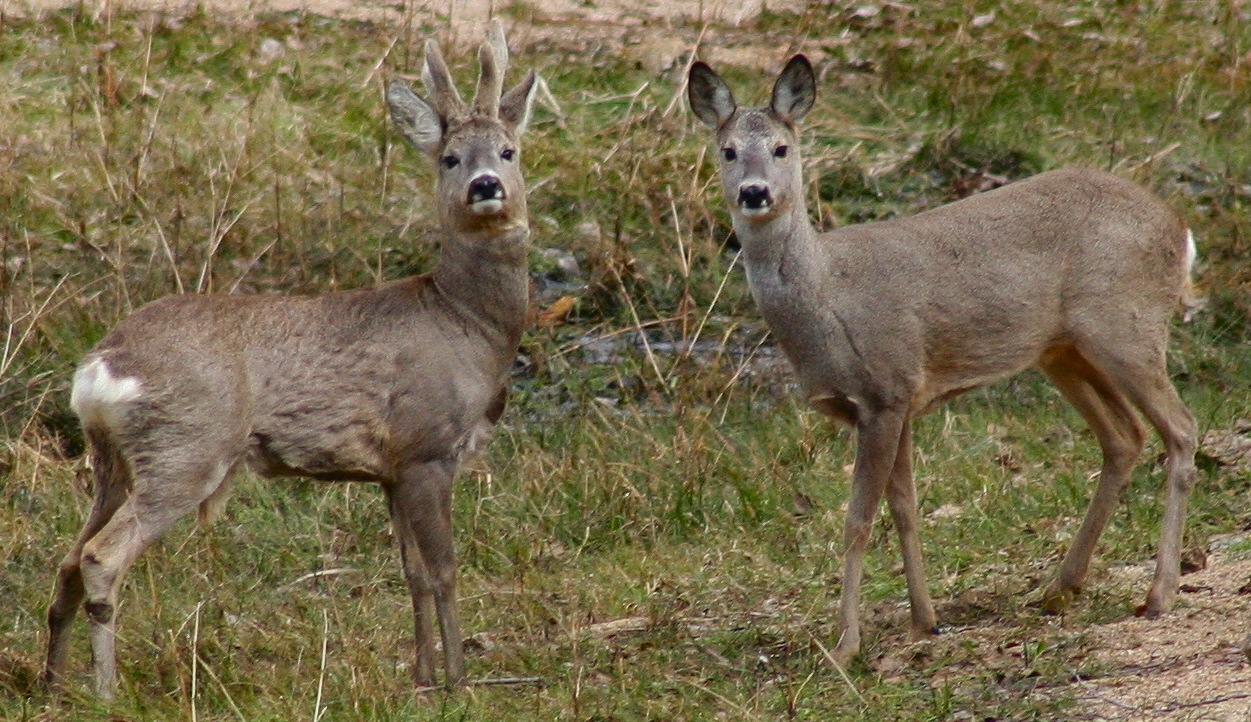
Roe deer

The even-toed ungulates are ungulates whose weight is borne about equally by the third and fourth toes, rather than mostly or entirely by the third as in perissodactyls. There are about 220 artiodactyl species, including many that are of great economic importance to humans.

- Family: Suidae (pigs)
  - Subfamily: Suinae
    - Genus: Sus
      - Wild boar, S. scrofa LC
- Family: Cervidae (deer)
  - Subfamily: Capreolinae
    - Genus: Capreolus
      - Roe deer, C. capreolus LC
  - Subfamily: Cervinae
    - Genus: Dama
      - European fallow deer, D. dama LC
- Family: Bovidae (cattle, antelope, sheep, goats)
  - Subfamily: Caprinae
    - Genus: Rupicapra
      - Chamois, R. rupicapra LC

== Order: Carnivora (carnivorans) ==
European jackal, a subspecies of the golden jackal

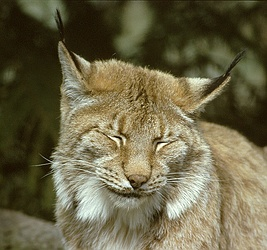
Eurasian lynx

There are over 260 species of carnivorans, the majority of which feed primarily on meat. They have a characteristic skull shape and dentition.

- Suborder: Feliformia
  - Family: Felidae (cats)
    - Subfamily: Felinae
      - Genus: Felis
        - European wildcat, F. silvestris LC
      - Genus: Lynx
        - Eurasian lynx, L. lynx LC
- Suborder: Caniformia
  - Family: Canidae (dogs, foxes)
    - Genus: Canis
      - Golden jackal, C. aureus LC
        - European jackal, C. a. moreoticus
      - Gray wolf, C. lupus LC
        - Eurasian wolf, C. l. lupus
    - Genus: Vulpes
      - Red fox, V. vulpes LC
  - Family: Ursidae (bears)
    - Genus: Ursus
      - Brown bear, U. arctos LC
        - Eurasian brown bear, U. a. arctos
  - Family: Mustelidae (mustelids)
    - Genus: Lutra
      - European otter, L. lutra NT
    - Genus: Martes
      - Beech marten, M. foina LC
      - European pine marten, M. martes LC
    - Genus: Meles
      - European badger, M. meles LC
    - Genus: Mustela
      - Stoat, M. erminea LC
      - Least weasel, M. nivalis LC
      - European polecat, M. putorius LC
  - Family: Phocidae (earless seals)
    - Genus: Monachus
      - Mediterranean monk seal, M. monachus VU possibly extirpated

== Order: Cetacea (whales) ==
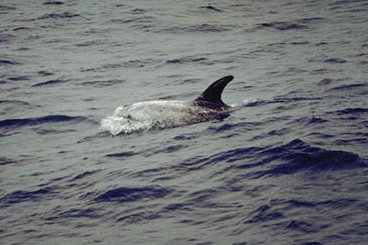
Risso's dolphin

The order Cetacea includes whales, dolphins and porpoises. They are the mammals most fully adapted to aquatic life with a spindle-shaped nearly hairless body, protected by a thick layer of blubber, and forelimbs and tail modified to provide propulsion underwater.

- Suborder: Mysticeti
  - Family: Balaenopteridae
    - Genus: Balaenoptera
      - Fin whale, B. physalus VU
- Suborder: Odontoceti
  - Superfamily: Platanistoidea
    - Family: Delphinidae (marine dolphins)
      - Genus: Delphinus
        - Short-beaked common dolphin, Delphinus delphis LC
      - Genus: Grampus
        - Risso's dolphin, Grampus griseus LC
      - Genus: Orcinus
        - Killer whale, Orcinus orca DD

== Order: Chiroptera (bats) ==
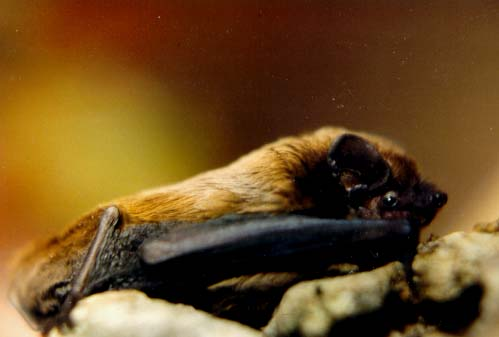
Lesser noctule

The bats' most distinguishing feature is that their forelimbs are developed as wings, making them the only mammals capable of flight. Bat species account for about 20% of all mammals. In Albania, 32 species were recorded.

- Family: Vespertilionidae
  - Subfamily: Myotinae
    - Genus: Myotis
      - Alcathoe bat, M. alcathoe DD
      - Brandt's bat, M. brandti LC
      - Bechstein's bat, M. bechsteini NT
      - Lesser mouse-eared bat, M. blythii LC
      - Long-fingered bat, M. capaccinii VU
      - Daubenton's bat, M. daubentonii LC
      - Geoffroy's bat, M. emarginatus LC
      - Greater mouse-eared bat, M. myotis LC
      - Whiskered bat, M. mystacinus LC
      - Natterer's bat, M. nattereri LC
  - Subfamily: Vespertilioninae
    - Genus: Eptesicus
      - Serotine bat, Eptesicus serotinus LC
    - Genus: Nyctalus
      - Greater noctule bat, N. lasiopterus VU
      - Lesser noctule, N. leisleri LC
      - Common noctule, N. noctula LC
      - Genus: Pipistrellus
        - Nathusius' pipistrelle, P. nathusii LC
        - Kuhl's pipistrelle, Pipistrellus kuhlii LC
        - Common pipistrelle, Pipistrellus pipistrellus LC
        - Soprano pipistrelle, Pipistrellus pygmaeus LC
      - Genus: Hypsugo
        - Savi's pipistrelle, H. savii LC
      - Genus: Vespertilio
        - Parti-coloured bat, Vespertilio murinus LC
      - Genus: Barbastella
        - Western barbastelle, Barbastella barbastellus NT
      - Genus: Plecotus
        - Alpine long-eared bat, P. macrobullaris LC
        - Grey long-eared bat, P. austriacus NT
        - Brown long-eared bat, P. auritus LC
        - Kolombatovic's long-eared bat, P. kolombatovici
    - Subfamily: Miniopterinae
      - Genus: Miniopterus
      - Common bent-wing bat, M. schreibersii VU
      - Genus: Tadarida
        - European free-tailed bat, Tadarida teniotis LC
  - Family: Rhinolophidae
    - Subfamily: Rhinolophinae
      - Genus: Rhinolophus
        - Blasius's horseshoe bat, R. blasii LC
        - Lesser horseshoe bat, Rhinolophus hipposideros LC
        - Greater horseshoe bat, Rhinolophus ferrumequinum LC
        - Mediterranean horseshoe bat, Rhinolophus euryale NT
        - Mehely's horseshoe bat, Rhinolophus mehelyi LC

== Order: Eulipotyphla (hedgehogs, shrews and moles) ==
Hedgehogs are easily recognised by their spines, shrews closely resemble mice, and moles are stout-bodied burrowers.

- Family: Erinaceidae (hedgehogs)
  - Subfamily: Erinaceinae
    - Genus: Erinaceus
      - Southern white-breasted hedgehog, E. concolor LC
- Family: Soricidae (shrews)
  - Subfamily: Crocidurinae
    - Genus: Crocidura
      - Bicolored shrew, C. leucodon LC
      - Lesser white-toothed shrew, C. suaveolens LC
    - Genus: Suncus
      - Etruscan shrew, Suncus etruscus LC
  - Subfamily: Soricinae
    - Tribe: Nectogalini
      - Genus: Neomys
        - Southern water shrew, Neomys anomalus LC
        - Eurasian water shrew, Neomys fodiens LC
    - Tribe: Soricini
      - Genus: Sorex
        - Alpine shrew, Sorex alpinus NT
        - Common shrew, Sorex araneus LC
        - Eurasian pygmy shrew, Sorex minutus LC
- Family: Talpidae (moles)
  - Subfamily: Talpinae
    - Tribe: Talpini
      - Genus: Talpa
        - Mediterranean mole, Talpa caeca LC
        - European mole, Talpa europaea LC
        - Stankovic's mole, Talpa stankovici LC

== Order: Lagomorpha (lagomorphs) ==
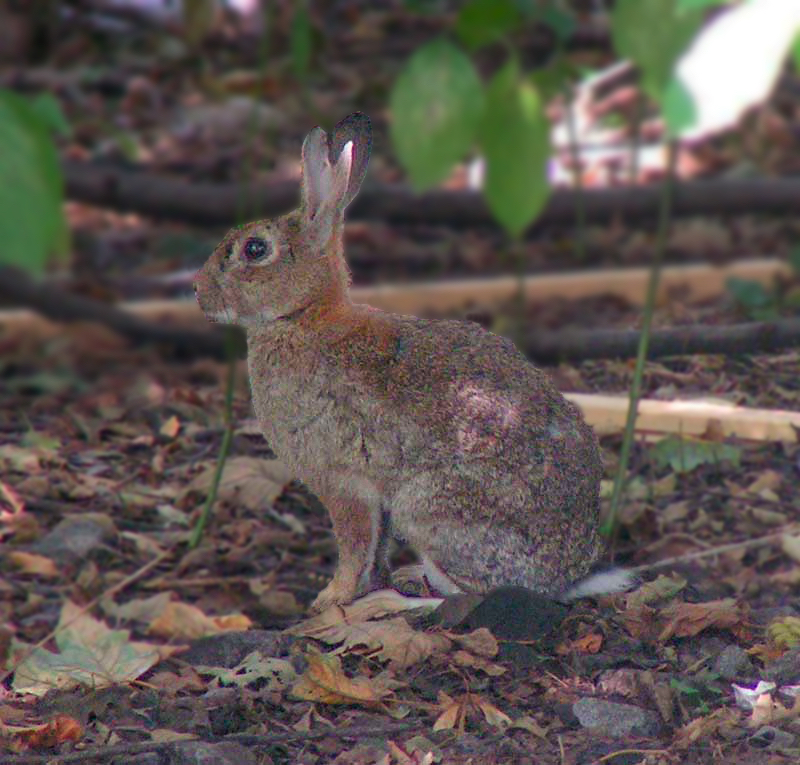
European rabbit

The lagomorphs comprise two families, Leporidae (hares and rabbits), and Ochotonidae (pikas). Though they can resemble rodents, and were classified as a superfamily in that order until the early 20th century, they have since been considered a separate order. They differ from rodents in a number of physical characteristics, such as having four incisors in the upper jaw rather than two.

- Family: Leporidae (rabbits, hares)
  - Genus: Lepus
    - European hare, L. europaeus LC
  - Genus: Oryctolagus
    - European rabbit, O. cuniculus NT introduced

== Order: Rodentia (rodents) ==
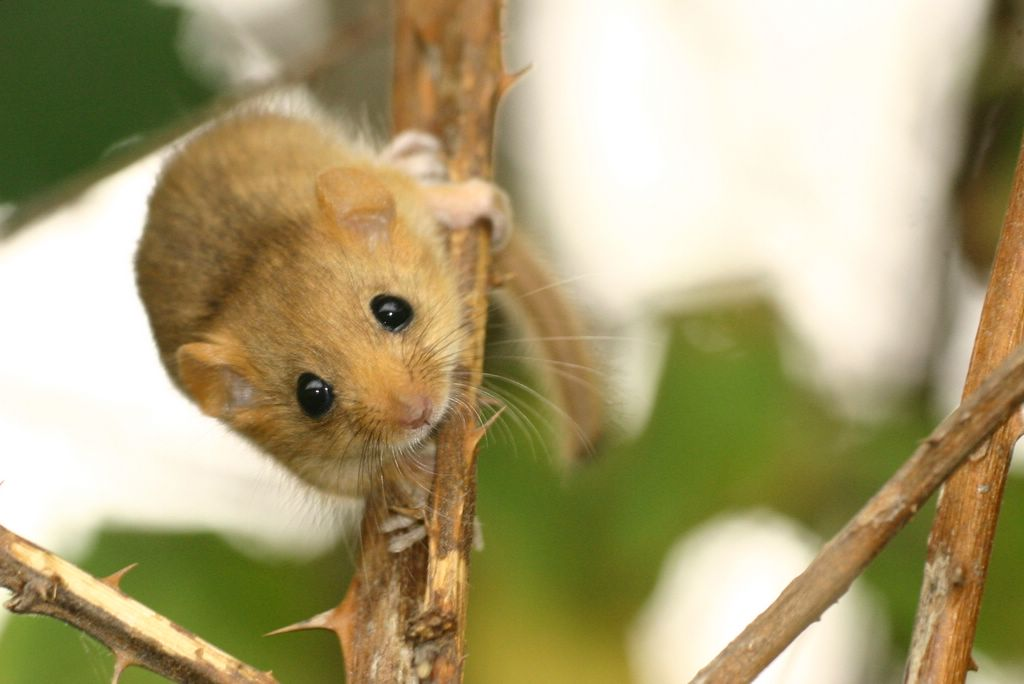
Hazel dormouse

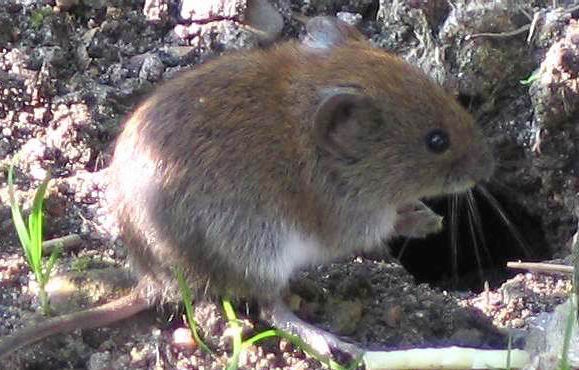
Bank vole

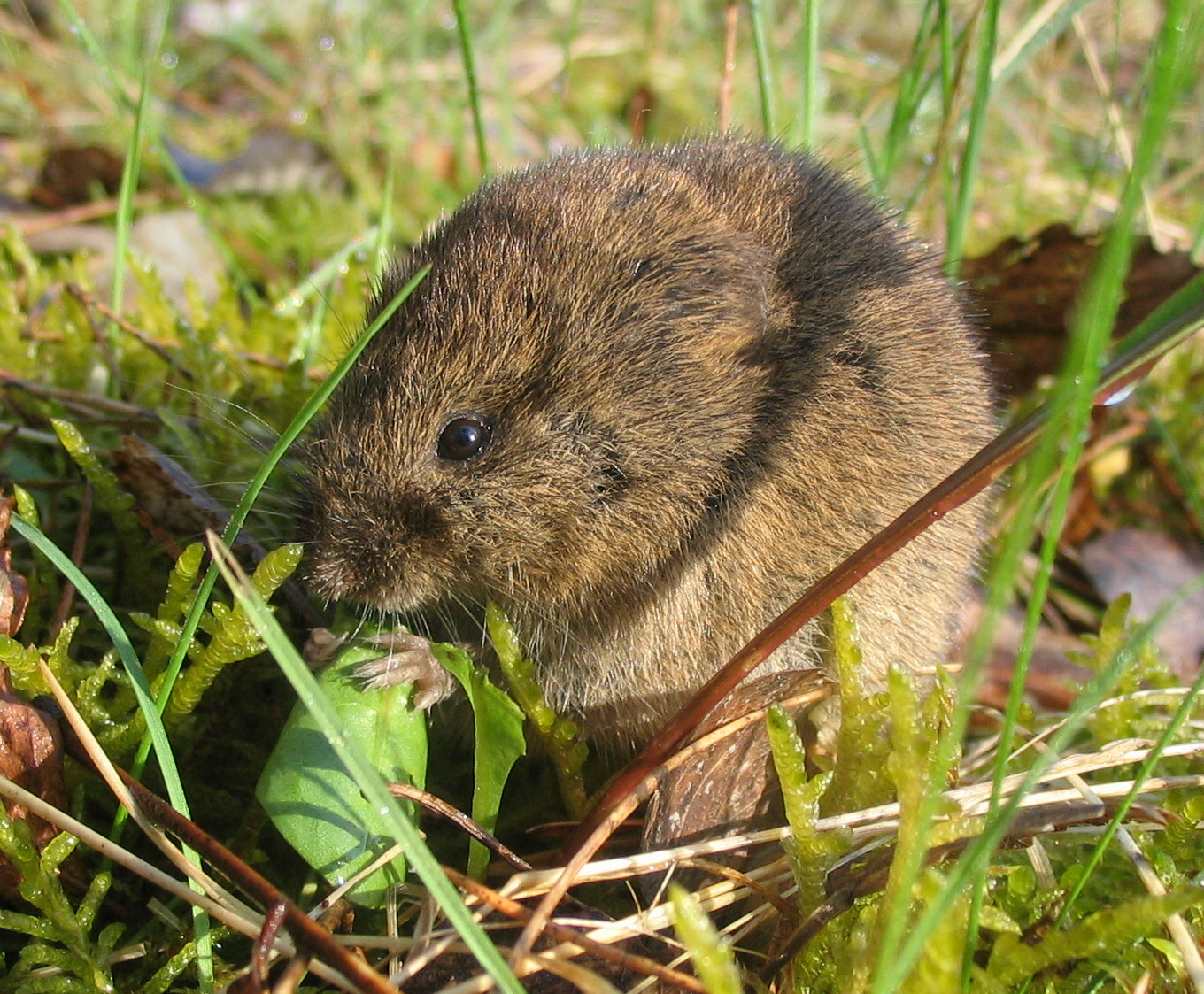
Common vole

Rodents make up the largest order of mammals, with over 40 percent of mammalian species. They have two incisors in the upper and lower jaw which grow continually and must be kept short by gnawing.

- Suborder: Sciurognathi
  - Family: Gliridae (dormice)
    - Subfamily: Leithiinae
      - Genus: Muscardinus
        - Hazel dormouse, Muscardinus avellanarius LC
  - Family: Cricetidae
    - Subfamily: Arvicolinae
      - Genus: Arvicola
        - Water vole, Arvicola terrestris LC
      - Genus: Clethrionomys
        - Bank vole, Clethrionomys glareolus LC
      - Genus: Microtus
        - Common vole, Microtus arvalis LC
        - Felten's vole, Microtus felteni LC
        - European pine vole, Microtus subterraneus LC
        - Thomas's pine vole, Microtus thomasi LC
  - Family: Muridae (mice, rats, voles, gerbils, hamsters, etc.)
    - Subfamily: Murinae
      - Genus: Apodemus
        - Yellow-necked mouse, Apodemus flavicollis LC
        - Broad-toothed field mouse, Apodemus mystacinus LC
        - Wood mouse, Apodemus sylvaticus LC

== See also ==
- List of chordate orders
- Lists of mammals by region
- List of prehistoric mammals
- Mammal classification
- List of mammals described in the 2000s
