= List of mammals of Bulgaria =

This list shows the IUCN Red List status of the 101 mammal species occurring in Bulgaria. Two of them are endangered, eleven are vulnerable, and four are near threatened.

Icons which state each species' global IUCN status:
EX	Extinct	No reasonable doubt that the last individual has died
CR	Critically Endangered	In imminent risk of extinction in the wild
EN	Endangered	Facing an extremely high risk of extinction in the wild
VU	Vulnerable	Facing a high risk of extinction in the wild
NT	Near Threatened	Doesn't meet any criteria that would categorise it as risking extinction but likely to in the future
LC	Least Concern	No current identifiable risks to this species
DD	Data Deficient	Inadequate information to make an assessment of the risks to this species

== Order: Rodentia (rodents) ==
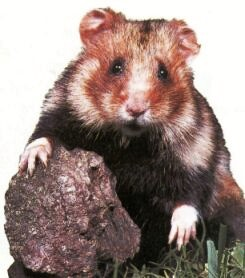
European hamster

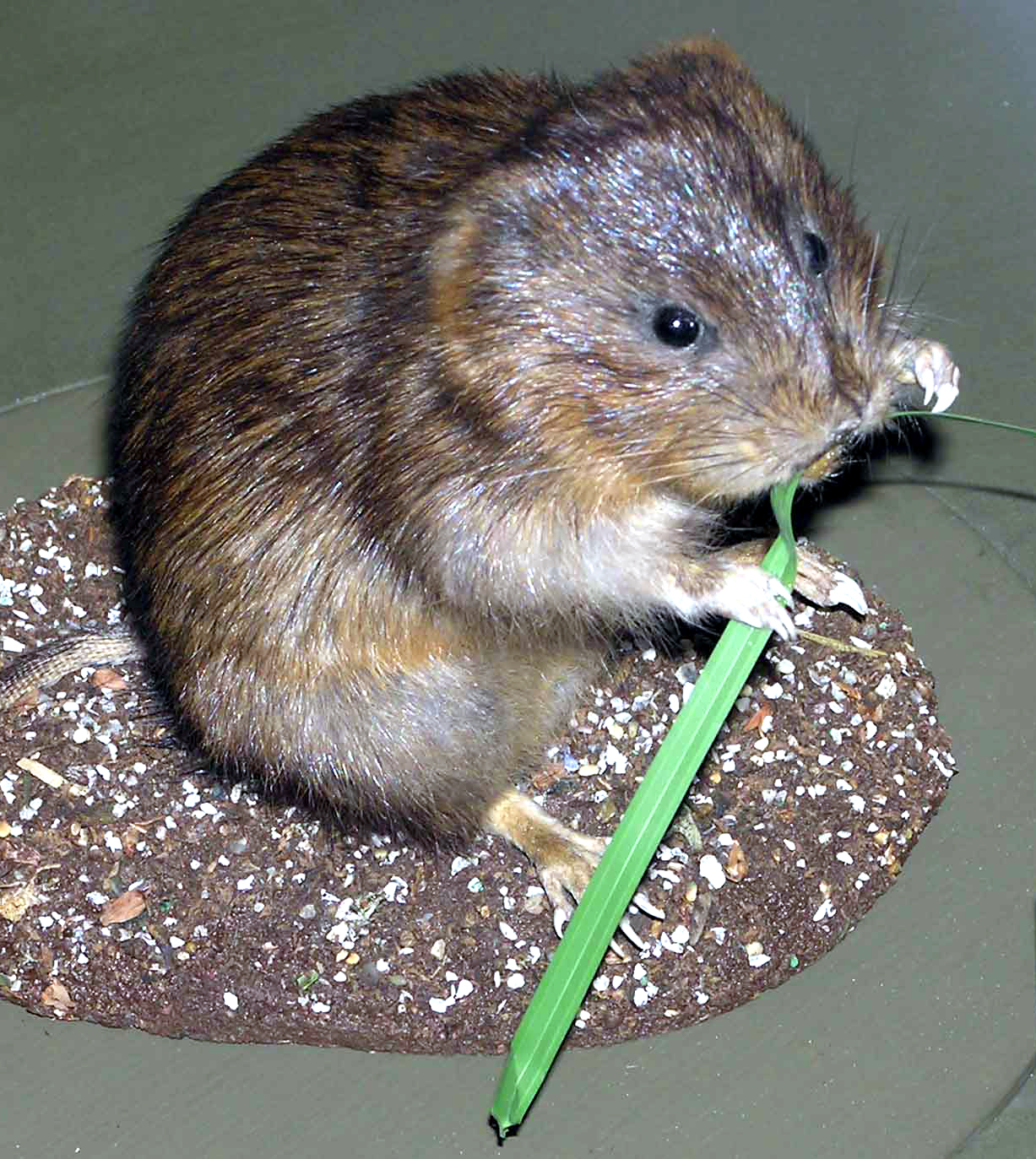
European water vole

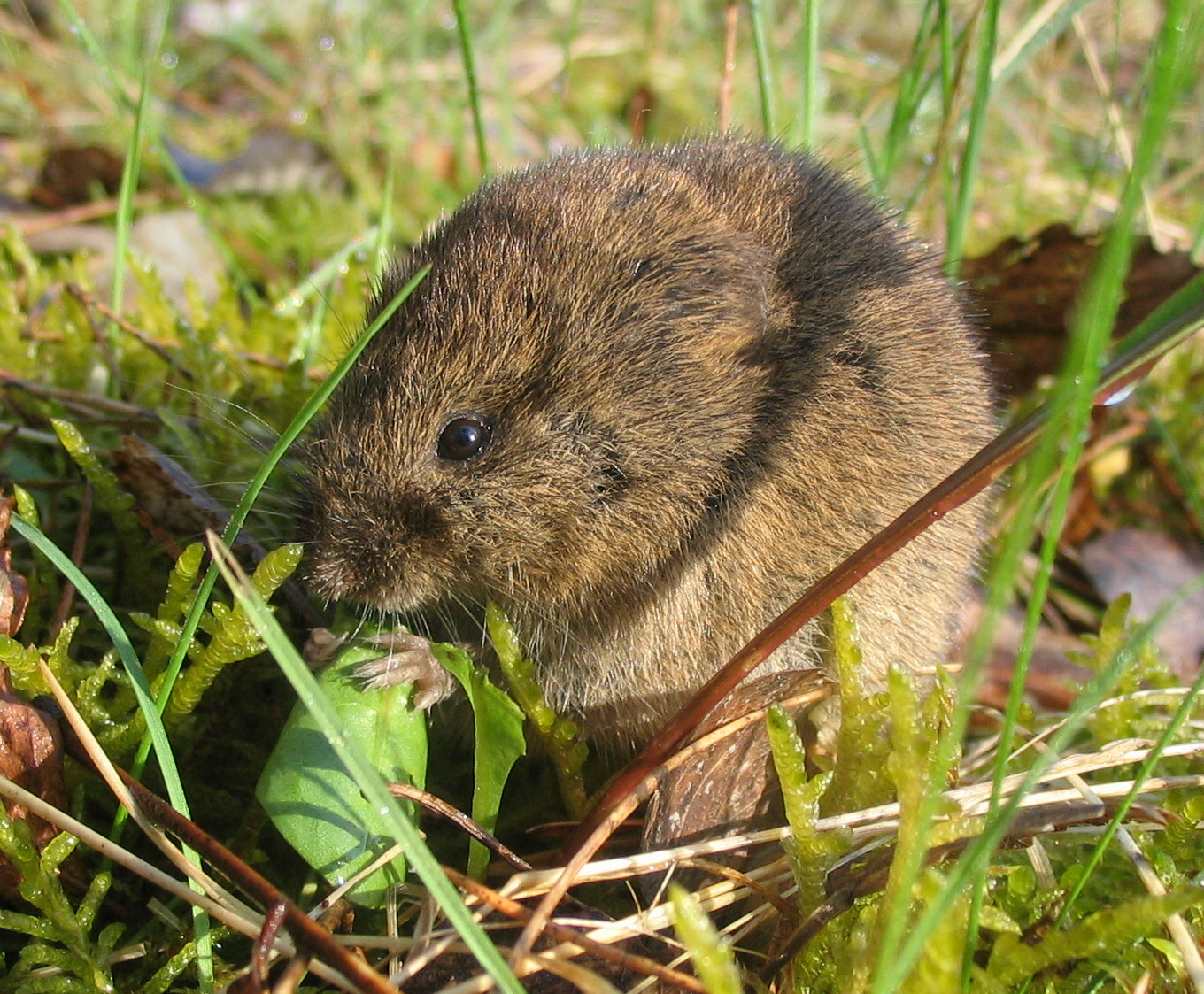
Common vole

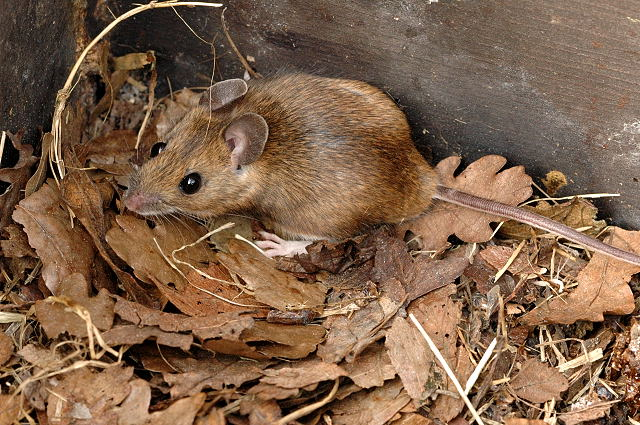
Yellow-necked mouse

Rodents make up the largest order of mammals, with over 40% of mammalian species. They have two incisors in the upper and lower jaw which grow continually and must be kept short by gnawing. Most rodents are small though the capybara can weigh up to 45 kg (100 lb).

- Suborder: Sciurognathi
  - Family: Sciuridae (squirrels)
    - Subfamily: Sciurinae
      - Tribe: Sciurini
        - Genus: Sciurus
          - Red squirrel, S. vulgaris LC
    - Subfamily: Xerinae
      - Tribe: Marmotini
        - Genus: Spermophilus
          - European ground squirrel, Spermophilus citellus EN
  - Family: Spalacidae (mole-rats)
    - Genus: Spalax
      - Lesser mole-rat, S. leucodon LC
  - Family: Gliridae (dormice)
    - Subfamily: Leithiinae
      - Genus: Dryomys
        - Forest dormouse, Dryomys nitedula LC
      - Genus: Muscardinus
        - Hazel dormouse, Muscardinus avellanarius LC
      - Genus: Myomimus
        - Roach's mouse-tailed dormouse, Myomimus roachi VU
    - Subfamily: Glirinae
      - Genus: Glis
        - European edible dormouse, Glis glis LC
  - Family: Dipodidae (jerboas)
    - Subfamily: Sicistinae
      - Genus: Sicista
        - Southern birch mouse, Sicista subtilis LC
  - Family: Spalacidae
    - Subfamily: Spalacinae
      - Genus: Nannospalax
        - Lesser mole rat, Nannospalax leucodon LC
  - Family: Cricetidae
    - Subfamily: Cricetinae
      - Genus: Cricetulus
        - Grey dwarf hamster, Cricetulus migratorius LC
      - Genus: Cricetus
        - European hamster, C. cricetus CR
      - Genus: Mesocricetus
        - Romanian hamster, Mesocricetus newtoni NT
    - Subfamily: Arvicolinae
      - Genus: Arvicola
        - European water vole, A. amphibius LC
      - Genus: Chionomys
        - Snow vole, C. nivalis LC
      - Genus: Clethrionomys
        - Bank vole, Clethrionomys glareolus LC
      - Genus: Microtus
        - Common vole, Microtus arvalis LC
        - Günther's vole, Microtus guentheri LC
        - Southern vole, Microtus rossiaemeridionalis LC
        - European pine vole, Microtus subterraneus LC
  - Family: Muridae (mice, rats, voles, gerbils, hamsters, etc.)
    - Subfamily: Murinae
      - Genus: Apodemus
        - Striped field mouse, Apodemus agrarius LC
        - Western broad-toothed field mouse, Apodemus epimelas LC
        - Yellow-necked mouse, Apodemus flavicollis LC
        - Wood mouse, Apodemus sylvaticus LC
        - Ural field mouse, Apodemus uralensis LC
      - Genus: Micromys
        - Eurasian harvest mouse, M. minutus LC
      - Genus: Mus
        - House mouse, M. musculus LC
        - Macedonian mouse, Mus macedonicus LC
        - Steppe mouse, Mus spicilegus LC
      - Genus: Rattus
        - Brown rat, R. norvegicus LC
        - Black rat, R. rattus LC

== Order: Lagomorpha (lagomorphs) ==
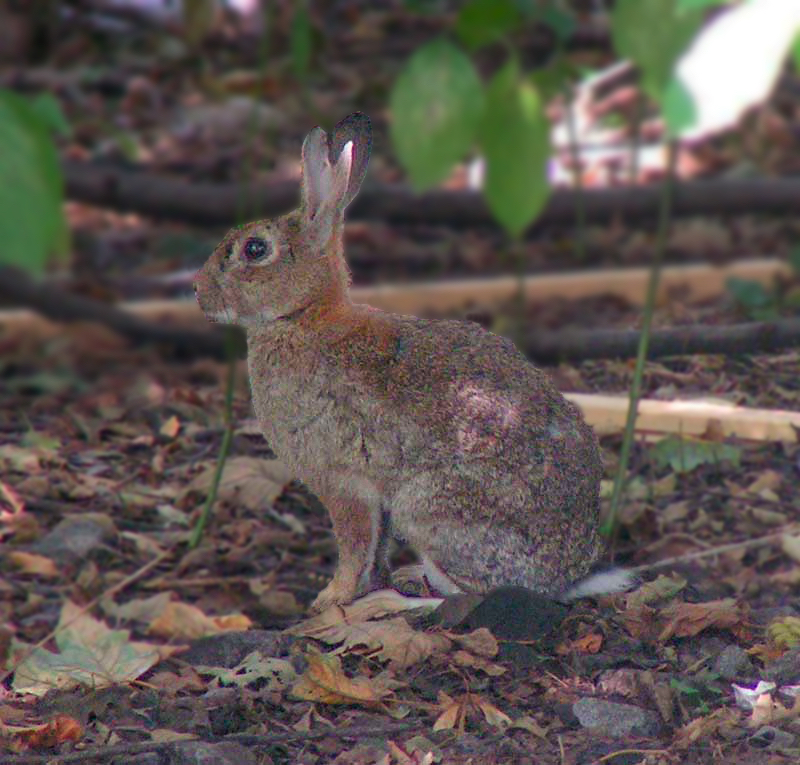
European rabbit

The lagomorphs comprise two families, Leporidae (hares and rabbits) and Ochotonidae (pikas). Though they can resemble rodents, and were classified as a superfamily in that order until the early 20th century, they have since been considered a separate order. They differ from rodents in having four incisors in the upper jaw rather than two.

- Family: Leporidae (rabbits, hares)
  - Genus: Lepus
    - European hare, L. europaeus LC
  - Genus: Oryctolagus
    - European rabbit, O. cuniculus NT introduced

== Order: Eulipotyphla (hedgehogs, shrews and moles) ==
Hedgehogs are easily recognised by their spines, shrews closely resemble mice, and moles are stout-bodied burrowers.

- Family: Erinaceidae (hedgehogs)
  - Subfamily: Erinaceinae
    - Genus: Erinaceus
      - West European hedgehog, E. europaeus NT
- Family: Soricidae (shrews)
  - Subfamily: Crocidurinae
    - Genus: Crocidura
      - Bicolored shrew, C. leucodon LC
      - Lesser white-toothed shrew, C. suaveolens LC
    - Genus: Suncus
      - Etruscan shrew, Suncus etruscus LC
  - Subfamily: Soricinae
    - Tribe: Nectogalini
      - Genus: Neomys
        - Southern water shrew, Neomys anomalus LC
        - Eurasian water shrew, Neomys fodiens LC
    - Tribe: Soricini
      - Genus: Sorex
        - Common shrew, Sorex araneus LC
        - Eurasian pygmy shrew, Sorex minutus LC
- Family: Talpidae (moles)
  - Subfamily: Talpinae
    - Tribe: Talpini
      - Genus: Talpa
        - European mole, Talpa europaea LC
        - Levantine mole, Talpa levantis LC
        - Stankovic's mole, Talpa stankovici LC

== Order: Chiroptera (bats) ==
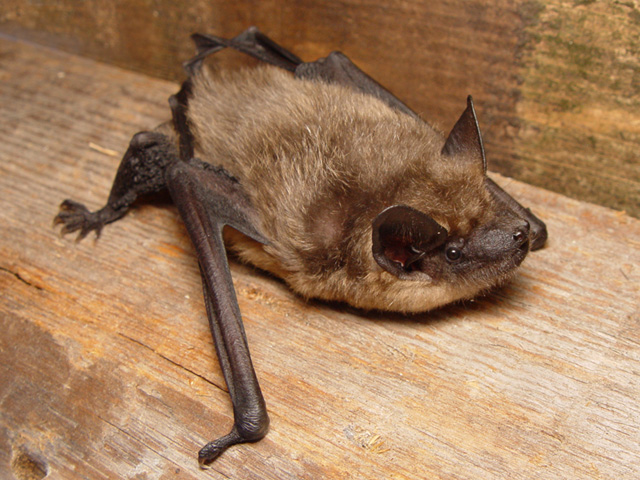
Serotine bat

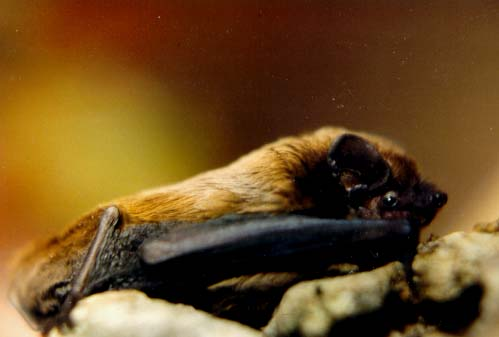
Lesser noctule

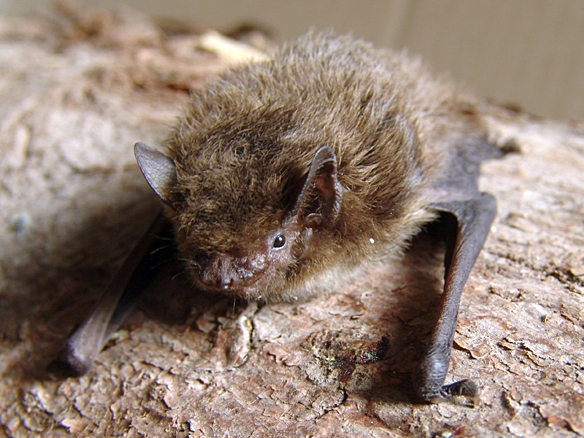
Nathusius' pipistrelle

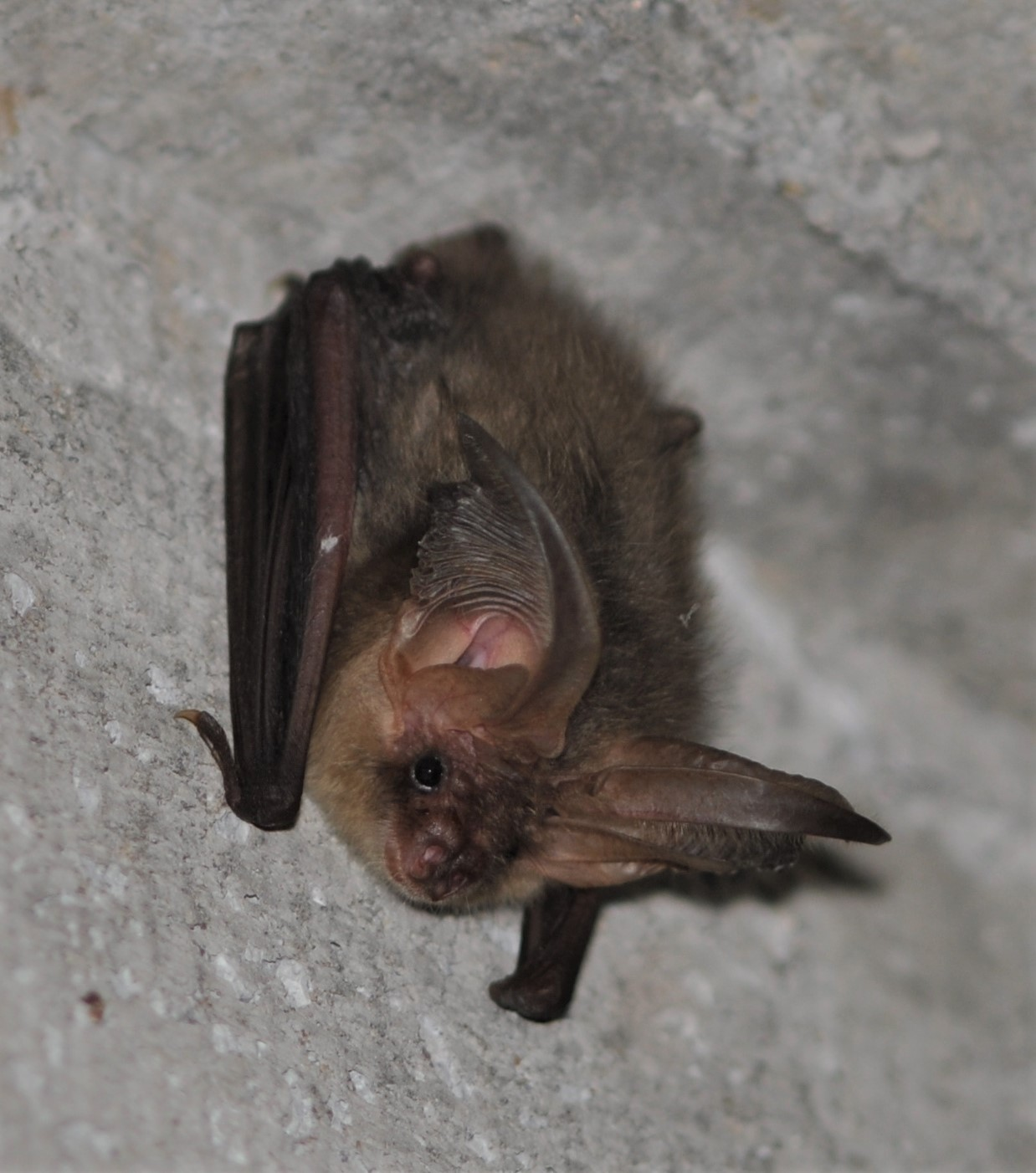
Brown long-eared bat

The bats' most distinguishing feature is that their forelimbs are developed as wings, making them the only mammals capable of flight. Bat species account for about 20% of all mammals.

- Family: Vespertilionidae
  - Subfamily: Myotinae
    - Genus: Myotis
      - Alcathoe bat, M. alcathoe DD
      - Bechstein's bat, M. bechsteini NT
      - Lesser mouse-eared bat, M. blythii LC
      - Brandt's bat, M. brandti LC
      - Long-fingered bat, M. capaccinii VU
      - Pond bat, M. dasycneme NT
      - Daubenton's bat, M. daubentonii LC
      - Geoffroy's bat, M. emarginatus LC
      - Greater mouse-eared bat, M. myotis LC
      - Whiskered bat, M. mystacinus LC
      - Natterer's bat, M. nattereri LC
  - Subfamily: Vespertilioninae
    - Genus: Barbastella
      - Western barbastelle, B. barbastellus NT
    - Genus: Eptesicus
      - Northern bat, Eptesicus nilssoni LC
      - Serotine bat, Eptesicus serotinus LC
    - Genus: Hypsugo
      - Savi's pipistrelle, H. savii LC
    - Genus: Nyctalus
      - Common noctule, N. noctula LC
      - Greater noctule bat, N. lasiopterus VU
      - Lesser noctule, N. leisleri LC
    - Genus: Pipistrellus
      - Nathusius' pipistrelle, P. nathusii LC
      - Kuhl's pipistrelle, P. kuhlii LC
      - Common pipistrelle, P. pipistrellus LC
      - Soprano pipistrelle, P. pygmaeus LC
    - Genus: Plecotus
      - Brown long-eared bat, Plecotus auritus LC
      - Grey long-eared bat, Plecotus austriacus NT
    - Genus: Vespertilio
      - Parti-coloured bat, Vespertilio murinus LC
  - Subfamily: Miniopterinae
    - Genus: Miniopterus
      - Common bent-wing bat, M. schreibersii VU
- Family: Molossidae
  - Genus: Tadarida
    - European free-tailed bat, Tadarida teniotis LC
- Family: Rhinolophidae
  - Subfamily: Rhinolophinae
    - Genus: Rhinolophus
      - Blasius's horseshoe bat, R. blasii LC
      - Mediterranean horseshoe bat, R. euryale NT
      - Greater horseshoe bat, R. ferrumequinum LC
      - Lesser horseshoe bat, R. hipposideros LC
      - Mehely's horseshoe bat, R. mehelyi VU

== Order: Cetacea (whales) ==
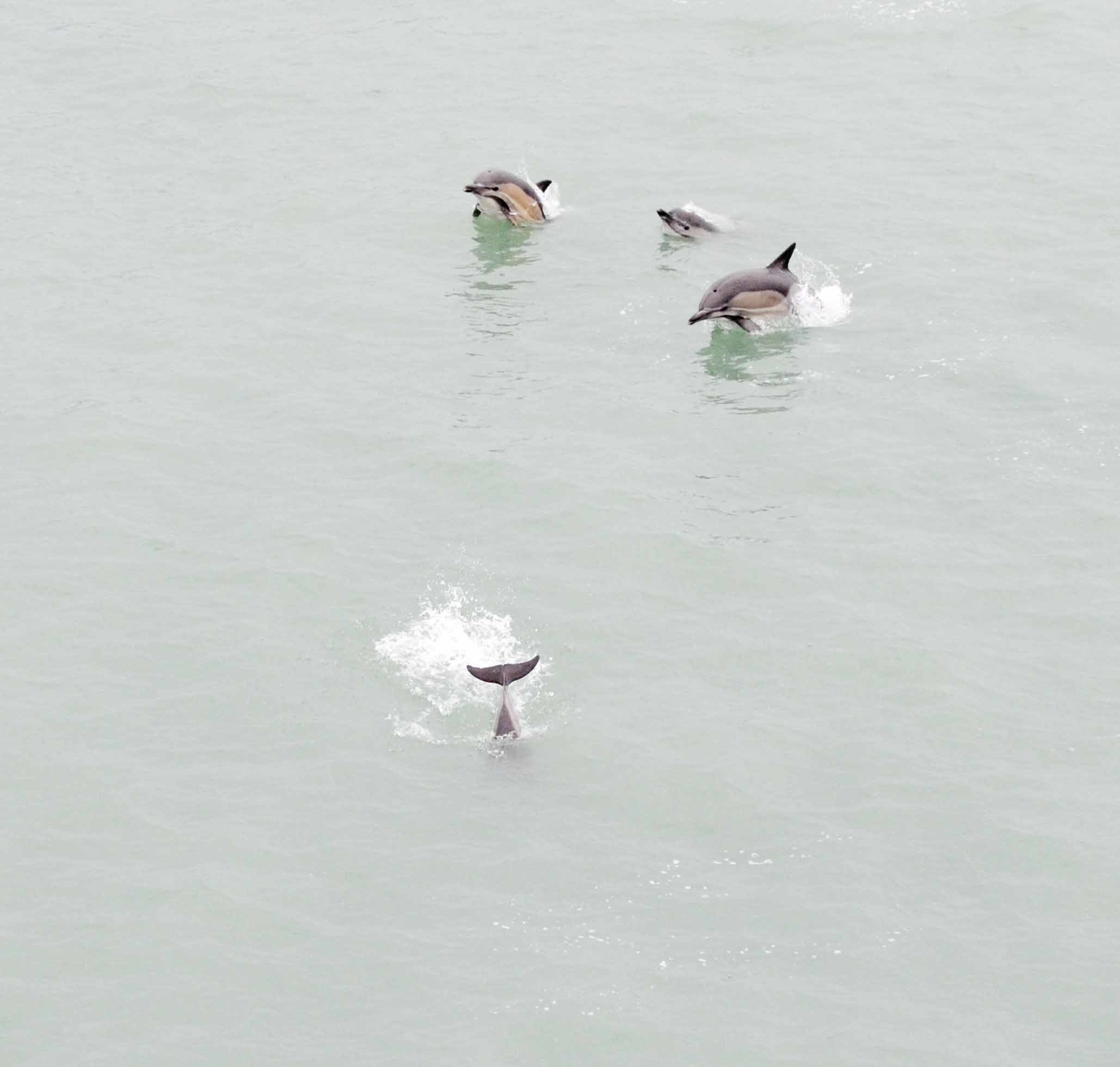
Common dolphins porpoising along a ferry at the port of Batumi

The order Cetacea includes whales, dolphins and porpoises. They are the mammals most fully adapted to aquatic life with a spindle-shaped nearly hairless body, protected by a thick layer of blubber, and forelimbs and tail modified to provide propulsion underwater.

- Suborder: Mysticeti
  - Family: Balaenopteridae (rorquals)
    - Genus: Balaenoptera
      - Common minke whale, B. acutorostrata LC
- Suborder: Odontoceti
  - Superfamily: Platanistoidea
    - Family: Phocoenidae
      - Genus: Phocoena
        - Harbour porpoise, Phocoena phocoena LC
    - Family: Delphinidae (marine dolphins)
      - Genus: Tursiops
        - Common bottlenose dolphin, Tursiops truncatus LC
      - Genus: Delphinus
        - Short-beaked common dolphin, Delphinus delphis LC

== Order: Carnivora (carnivorans) ==
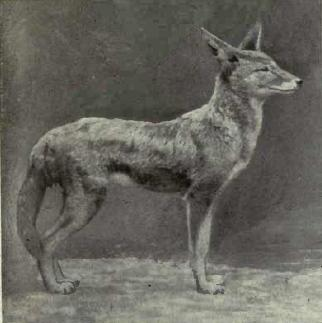
European jackal

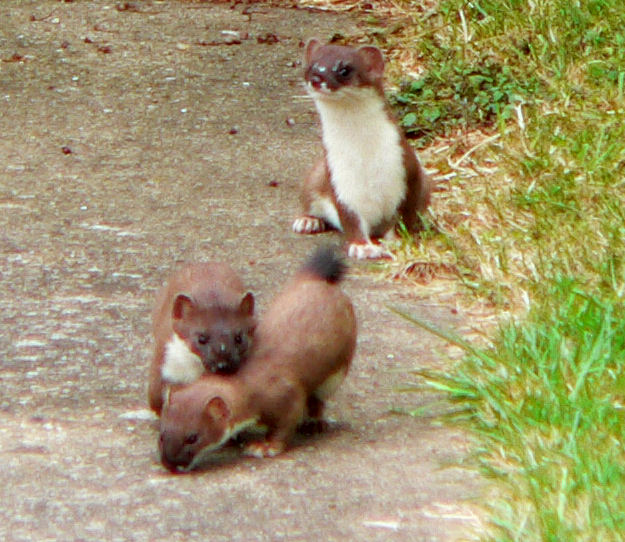
Stoat

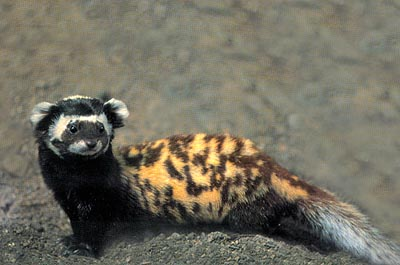
Marbled polecat

There are over 260 species of carnivorans, the majority of which eat meat as their primary dietary item. They have a characteristic skull shape and dentition.

- Suborder: Feliformia
  - Family: Felidae (cats)
    - Subfamily: Felinae
      - Genus: Felis
        - European wildcat, F. silvestris LC
      - Genus: Lynx
        - Eurasian lynx, L. lynx LC
- Suborder: Caniformia
  - Family: Canidae (dogs, foxes)
    - Genus: Vulpes
      - Red fox, V. vulpes LC
    - Genus: Canis
      - Golden jackal, C. aureus LC
      - Gray wolf, C. lupus LC
        - Eurasian wolf, C. l. lupus
  - Family: Ursidae (bears)
    - Genus: Ursus
      - Brown bear, U. arctos LC
        - Eurasian brown bear U. a. arctos
  - Family: Mustelidae (mustelids)
    - Genus: Mustela
      - Stoat, M. erminea LC
      - Steppe polecat, M. eversmannii LC
      - Least weasel, M. nivalis LC
      - European polecat, M. putorius LC
    - Genus: Vormela
      - Marbled polecat, V. peregusna VU
    - Genus: Martes
      - Beech marten, M. foina LC
      - European pine marten, M. martes LC
    - Genus: Meles
      - European badger, M. meles LC
    - Genus: Lutra
      - Eurasian otter, L. lutra NT
  - Family: Phocidae (earless seals)
    - Genus: Monachus
      - Mediterranean monk seal, M. monachus VU

== Order: Artiodactyla (even-toed ungulates) ==
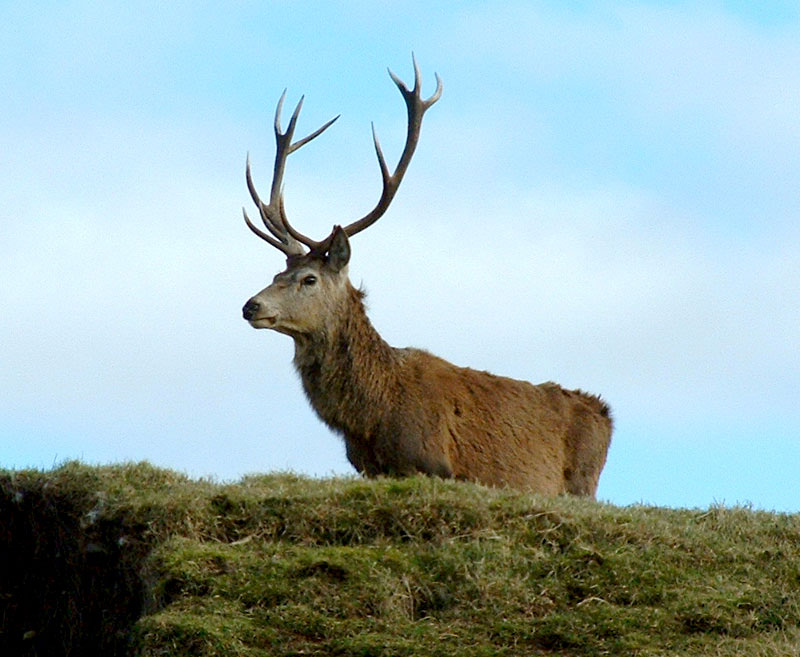
Red deer

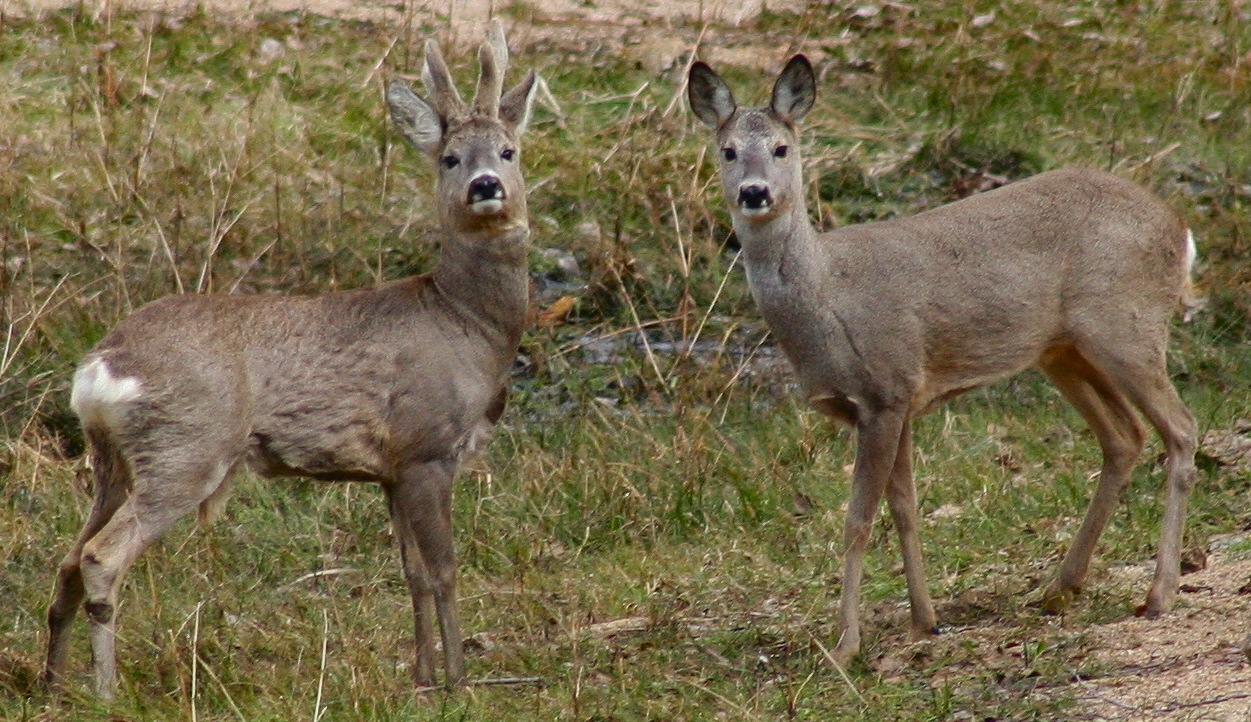
Roe deer

The even-toed ungulates are ungulates whose weight is borne about equally by the third and fourth toes, rather than mostly or entirely by the third as in perissodactyls. There are about 220 artiodactyl species, including many that are of great economic importance to humans.

- Family: Bovidae (bovids)
  - Subfamily: Bovidae
    - Genus: Bison
      - European bison, B. bonasus NT reintroduced
        - Carpathian wisent, B. b. hungarorum EX
- Family: Suidae (pigs)
  - Subfamily: Suinae
    - Genus: Sus
      - Wild boar, S. scrofa LC
- Family: Cervidae (deer)
  - Subfamily: Cervinae
    - Genus: Cervus
      - Red deer, C. elaphus LC
    - Genus: Dama
      - European fallow deer, D. dama LC
  - Subfamily: Capreolinae
    - Genus: Capreolus
      - Roe deer, C. capreolus LC
- Family: Bovidae (cattle, antelope, sheep, goats)
  - Subfamily: Caprinae
    - Genus: Capra
      - Alpine ibex, C. ibex LC introduced
    - Genus: Rupicapra
      - Chamois, R. rupicapra LC

== Locally extinct ==
- Mediterranean monk seal, Monachus monachus
- European mink, Mustela lutreola

== See also ==
- List of chordate orders
- Lists of mammals by region
- List of prehistoric mammals
- Mammal classification
- List of mammals described in the 2000s
