= Martino's mole =

Scientific classification
- Kingdom: Animalia
- Phylum: Chordata
- Class: Mammalia
- Order: Eulipotyphla
- Family: Talpidae
- Genus: Talpa
- Species: T. martinorum

Binomial name
- Talpa martinorum Kryštufek, Nedyalkov, Astrin and Hutterer, 2018.
- Martino's mole range

Species of mammal

Martino's mole (Talpa martinorum) is a species of small blind mole in the family Talpidae found in eastern Thrace along the western Black Sea coast in south-eastern Bulgaria and north-eastern Turkey, mainly in the Strandzha mountain range. In Bulgaria it is found in Strandzha Nature Park. Martino's mole is named in honour of the couple Evgeniya and Vladimir Martino, key earlier Balkan mammalogists.

== Taxonomy ==
Individuals of this species were formerly classified as T. caeca or T. levantis until being classified as a new species. T. martinorum is not closely related to the other Talpa endemic to the Balkans, T. stankovici. Rather, it is most closely related to the widespread T. europaea as well as T. aquitania, and T. occidentalis, both of which are endemic to western Europe. Based on this, T. martinorum likely originated from an isolated population of a mole species that was also ancestral to T. europaea, as is also considered to be the case for the origin of T. aquitania and T. occidentalis. Fossil evidence shows that a mole species similar to the present T. martinorum lived in the region during the Pliocene, indicating that T. martinorum has persisted in its current territory for a long time.
