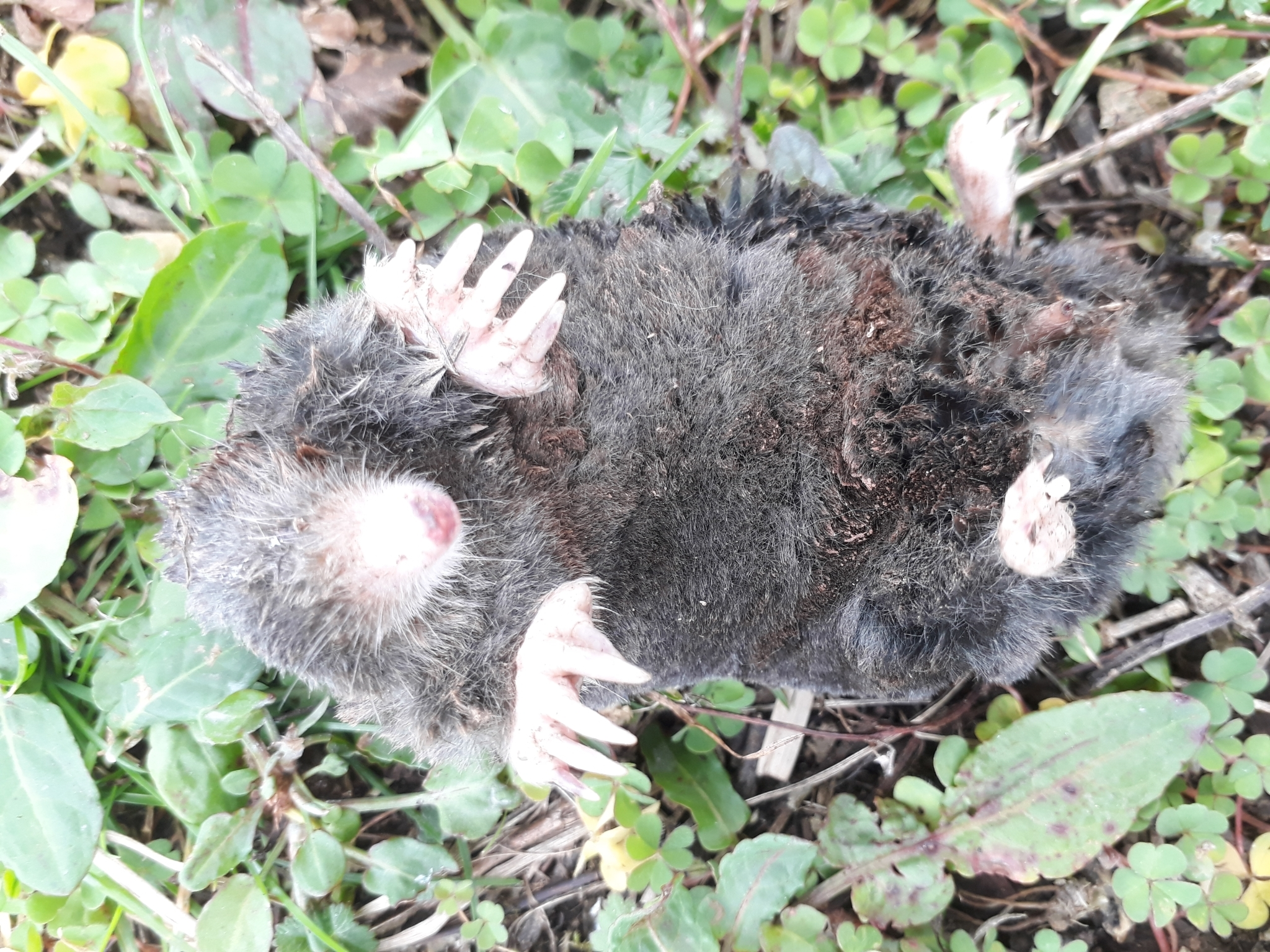

Scientific classification
- Kingdom: Animalia
- Phylum: Chordata
- Class: Mammalia
- Order: Eulipotyphla
- Family: Talpidae
- Genus: Talpa
- Species: T. talyschensis

Binomial name
- Talpa talyschensis Vereschchagin, 1945
- Talysch mole range

Synonyms
- Talpa levantis talyschensis

= Talysch mole =

Species of mammal

The Talysch mole (Talpa talyschensis) is a species of mammal in the family Talpidae. It is a small member of the family, which outwardly resembles the Levant mole (T. levantis), but is genetically closer to Père David's mole (T. davidiana). It is common on the southwest coast of the Caspian Sea, from southern of Azerbaijan through most of the north of Iran. The habitat includes temperate rainforests and scrub areas. There is little information about the life history of the Talysch mole. It was described in 1945, but had long been considered a subspecies of various other Eurasian moles, and was only recognized as a distinct species in the mid-2010s. No surveys have been carried out to quantify the status of the species.

== Taxonomy ==
The Talysch mole is a species of the genus Talpa, which contains Eurasian moles. The genus includes around a dozen other members, including the European mole (Talpa europaea) as its most famous representative. The Eurasian moles belong to the tribe of true moles (Talpini) and the mole family (Talpidae). The true moles in turn include the mostly burrowing forms of the moles, while other members of the family only partially live underground, move above ground or have a semi-aquatic way of life.

The first scientific description of the Talysch mole was provided by Nikolai Kusmitsch Vereschtschagin in 1945. He used the name Talpa orientalis talyschensis, seeing it as a subspecies of Talpa orientalis, a species that is now counted as synonymous with the Caucasian mole (T. caucasica). The lectotype consists of a skull of an adult male. The type locality is in the south of Azerbaijan in the Talysh Mountains around Masallı.

In the 1960s and 1970s, the Talysch mole was sometimes also considered a variant of the blind mole (Talpa caeca). However, the close external resemblance to the Levant mole (Talpa levantis), along with a matching karyotype, led the Talysch mole to be recognized as the eastern subspecies of the Levant mole by the end of the 20th century, despite both taxa being widely separated in range. The main differences between the two species are the details of the tooth design.

Some scientists, however, questioned the close connection between the Talysch and Levantine moles based on anatomical data. This view was supported by molecular genetic studies from 2015. This study found a closer relationship to the Père David's mole, which occurs further south. Both species diverged at the end of the Pliocene, around 2.5 million years ago. The lineage that led to the Levant mole, on the other hand, had already diverged during the transition from the Miocene to the Pliocene. As a result, the Talysch mole was recognized as an independent species, which was also confirmed by the eighth volume of the standard work Handbook of the Mammals of the World in 2018.

== Distribution ==
The distribution area of the Talysch mole includes the southwestern coastal areas of the Caspian Sea. The northern limit of the occurrence is reached in the region around Lankaran in southern Azerbaijan, the southern limit is found near Chalus in northern Iran. This species is restricted to the Caspian Hyrcanian mixed forests, which stretch across the Talysh and Alborz Mountains and consist of temperate rainforests and boxwood thickets with a large amounts of moss. The altitude distribution ranges from sea level to around 300 m.

== Characteristics ==
=== Description ===
The Talysh mole is a small member of the genus Talpa. Its head-trunk length is 10.4 to 11.4 cm, the tail length 2.0 to 2.5 cm and the weight 31 to 49 g. The sexual dimorphism is only slightly pronounced. In body dimensions, the Talysh mole is comparable to the Levant mole. Like all Eurasian moles, it is characterized by a cylindrical and sturdy body, the neck is short and the forefeet resembles grave digging. The fur has a dark gray to blackish color. The eyes remain hidden under the skin. The rear foot length is 1.6 to 1.7 cm.

=== Features of skull and teeth ===
The skull is 31.1 mm long on average, and the cranium is 15.0 mm wide and 8.7 mm high. The rostrum is 8.3 mm wide at the base and narrows to 4.3 mm towards the front. The tooth formula is: $\frac{3.1.4.3}{3.1.4.3}$; the dentition consists of 44 teeth. On the anterior upper molar, the mesostyle, a small cusp between the two main cusps on the lip side (paraconus and metaconus), has two small tips, whereas this is only single-pointed in the Levant mole. The upper row of teeth is around 11.3 mm long.

=== Genetics ===
The diploid chromosome set is 2n = 34.

== Life history ==
Little information is available about the way of life of the Talysch mole; it is likely similar to that of the Levant mole. In the region around Chalus, numerous molehills have been observed in forests and in bush areas on sandy subsoil.

== Threats and conservation ==
Talysch mole has not yet been recognized by the IUCN. Information on the status of populations and protective measures is not available.

== Literature ==
- Boris Kryštufek und Masaharu Motokawa: Talpidae (Moles, Desmans, Star-nosed Moles and Shrew Moles). In: Don E. Wilson und Russell A. Mittermeier (Hrsg.): Handbook of the Mammals of the World. Volume 8: Insectivores, Sloths, Colugos. Lynx Edicions, Barcelona 2018, S. 552–620 (S. 609–610) ISBN 978-84-16728-08-4
- М. В. Зайцев, Л. Л. Войта und Б. И. Шефтель: Млекопитающие фауны России и сопредельных территорий. Насекомоядные. Санкт-Петербург, 2014, S. 1–390 (S. 150–152)
