= Short-faced mole =

Conservation status
- Least Concern (IUCN 3.1)

Scientific classification
- Kingdom: Animalia
- Phylum: Chordata
- Class: Mammalia
- Order: Eulipotyphla
- Family: Talpidae
- Subfamily: Talpinae
- Tribe: Talpini
- Genus: Scaptochirus; Milne-Edwards, 1867
- Species: S. moschatus

Binomial name
- Scaptochirus moschatus Milne-Edwards, 1867
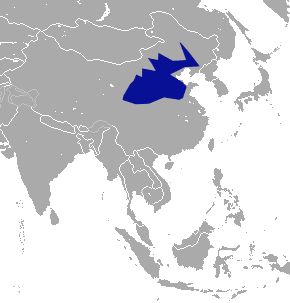
- Short-faced mole range

Species of mammal

The short-faced mole (Scaptochirus moschatus) is a species of mammal in the family Talpidae. It is the only species within the genus Scaptochirus. It is endemic to China.
