= Nova virus =

Nova mobatvirus

Virus classification
- (unranked): Virus
- Realm: Riboviria
- Kingdom: Orthornavirae
- Phylum: Negarnaviricota
- Class: Bunyaviricetes
- Order: Elliovirales
- Family: Hantaviridae
- Genus: Mobatvirus
- Species: Nova mobatvirus

Species of virus

Nova virus is a single-stranded, negative-sense, enveloped RNA virus with a trisegmented genome. It belongs to one of the most divergent lineages of the hantavirus group, which consists of zoonotic viruses belonging to the family Bunyaviridae. As of now, no human cases of infection have been reported.

== Natural reservoir ==
It was previously believed that hantaviruses were primarily rodent-borne. However, over the last two decades, multiple species have also been detected in shrews, moles and bats. In 2009, Nova virus was first isolated from the archival liver tissue of the European mole (Talpa europaea) captured in Hungary in 1999. The first complete genome characterization was published in 2015 and it was obtained from a European mole originating from Belgium. It has been concluded that the virus shows a close phylogenetic relationship with bat- and shrew-borne hantaviruses. Furthermore, there is a chance that the early or original hosts of primordial hantaviruses may have been ancestral soricomorphs, rather than rodents. Studies have been conducted to explore the prevalence of Nova virus infection in European moles – in a region of France, almost 65% of captured moles were positive, and a similarly high prevalence has been found in Poland. Those results suggest an efficient enzootic transmission, a well-established host-pathogen relationship, and also that the fact that the Nova virus might be widespread throughout the distribution range of the European mole, which extends from Great Britain and Spain to the Asian part of Russia, through most of continental Europe.

== Zoonotic potential ==
Not all hantaviruses are pathogenic but several species are able to cause rapidly progressive and often fatal zoonotic diseases, such as hemorrhagic fever with renal syndrome (HFRS) carried by murine and arvicoline rodents in Eurasia, and hantavirus cardiopulmonary syndrome (HCPS) harbored by neotomine and sigmodontine rodents in the Americas. Not a lot is known about the pathogenicity of the insectivore-borne hantaviruses, even though the number of identified species is constantly increasing. Neither one of them, including the Nova virus, has yet been connected to a disease in humans. Considering the fact that the viral sequences have been detected in kidney tissue, it is possible that viruses could be present in urine, and that the mode of transmission could be through virus shedding in secretions and excretions. Certain professions or individuals might be at risk of infection – those who might be exposed to shrews, moles and their presumably infectious excretions or secretions, for example mammalogists, field biologists, forestry workers and outdoor cat owners.

== See also ==
- Hantavirus hemorrhagic fever with renal syndrome
