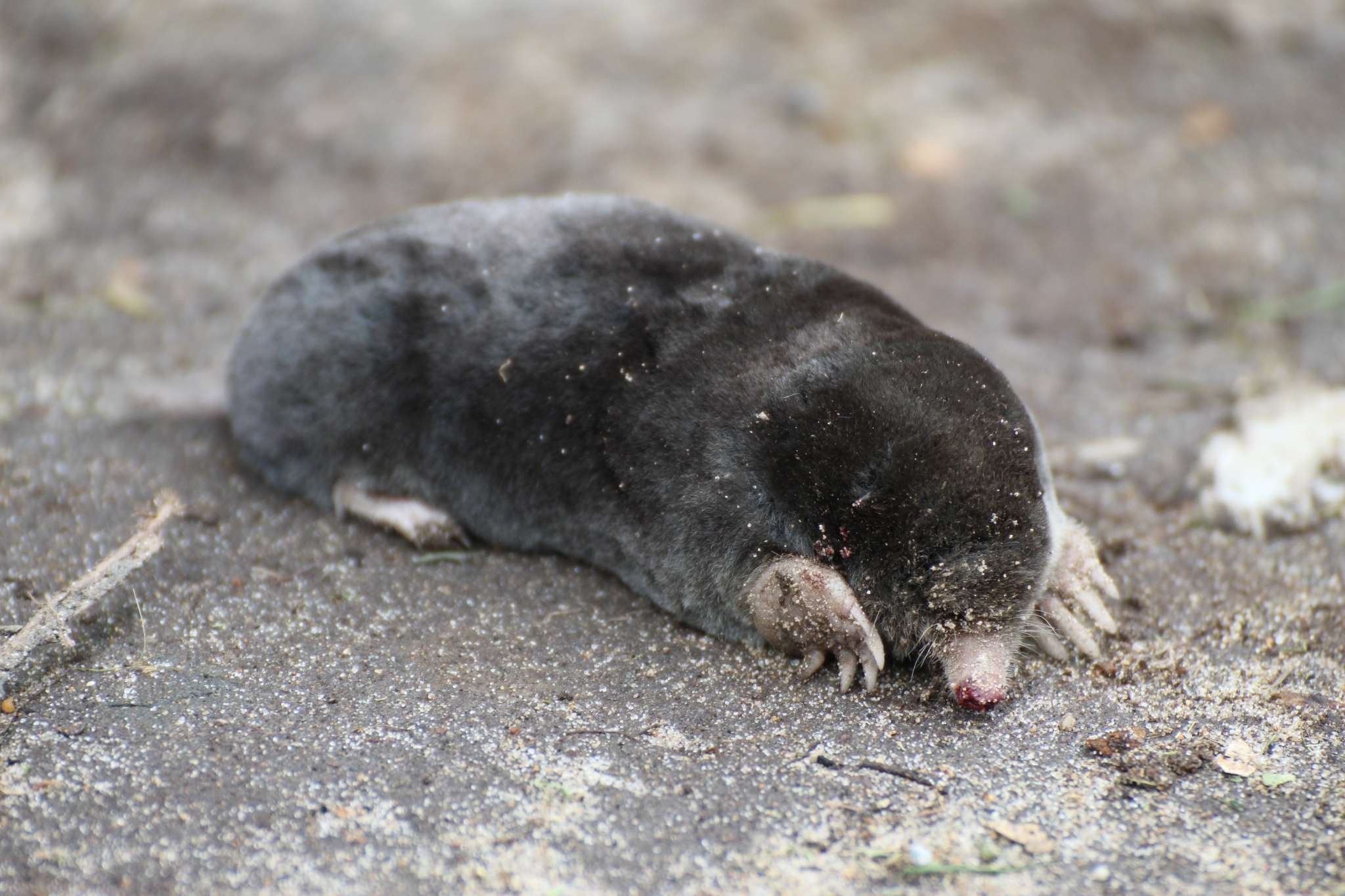
- Iberian mole in Oleiros, Spain

Conservation status
- Least Concern (IUCN 3.1)

Scientific classification
- Kingdom: Animalia
- Phylum: Chordata
- Class: Mammalia
- Order: Eulipotyphla
- Family: Talpidae
- Genus: Talpa
- Species: T. occidentalis

Binomial name
- Talpa occidentalis Cabrera, 1907
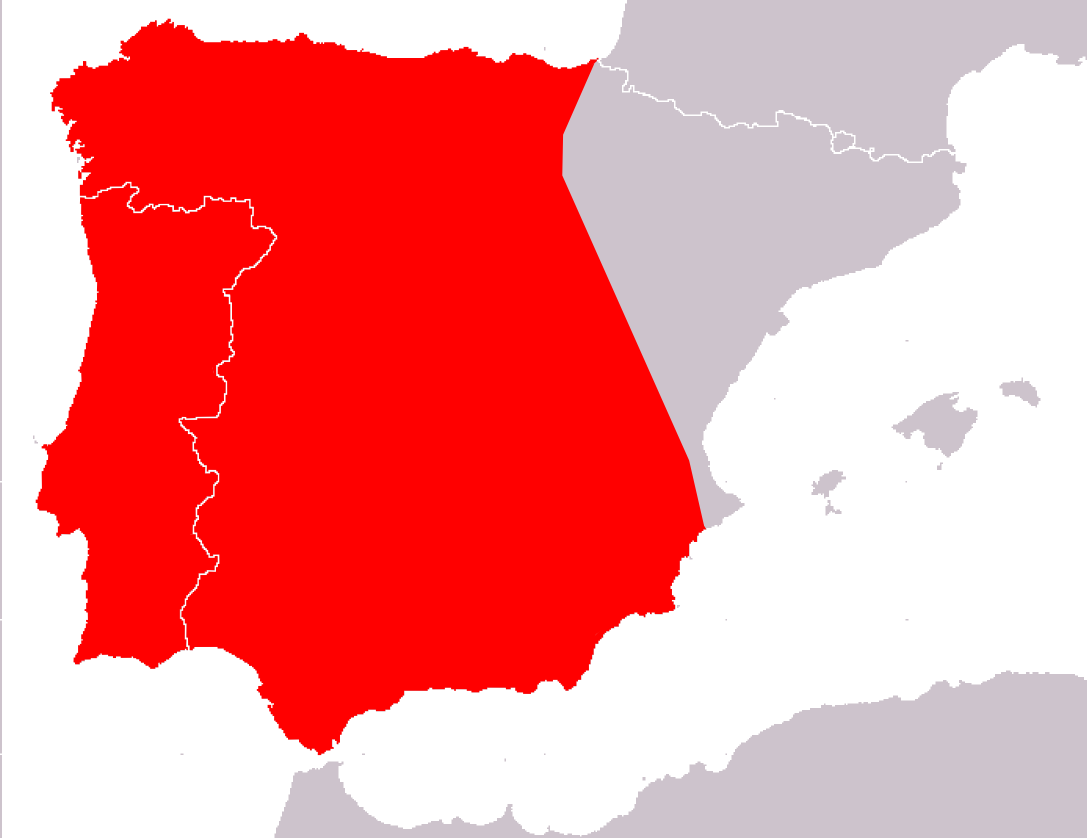
- Iberian mole range

= Iberian mole =

Species of mammal

The Iberian mole (Talpa occidentalis) is a species of mammal in the family Talpidae. The moles live in a variety of moist soil habitats in the Iberian peninsula, including in cultivated areas. The females are hermaphroditic and slightly smaller than the males. Talpa occidentalis is considered of least concern by the IUCN.

== Taxonomy ==
First described as a subspecies of Talpa caeca by Angel Cabrera in 1907, Miller shortly after identified it as a separate species based on the skull, and it was formally identified as Talpa occidentalis by Barrett-Hamilton in 1911. It was later again considered a subspecies by Niethammer in 1962, until reanalysis by Jiminzez et all in 1984 and Filipucci et al in 1987.

== Description ==
Adult males are slightly larger than females, at an average of 65 grams (2.3 oz) and 53.5 grams (1.89 oz) respectively.

It is found in Spain and Portugal, primarily in the northwest. It is most commonly found in meadows, cropland or pastures, and woodlands, as well as any temperate area with deep, moist soil that is not too rock, sandy, or otherwise poorly suited for digging. It eats primarily earthworms, and its habitat tends to be areas high in earthworms. It prefers wetter areas, so long as the soil is not too damp to dig in. This includes both naturally wet soils and artificially irrigated croplands and pasture. The species is common in places with traditional agricultural practices.

The breeding period is September to May, and pregnancy can occur from October to April. The gestational period is approximately 28 days. Young are weaned by May, after approximately 30 days of nursing. Males reach sexual maturity at approximately one year old. Like other species of the genus, females are hermaphroditic, with ovotestis. The prominence of the testicles as opposed to the ovary tissue decreases during the breeding season. Some phenotypically male individuals were also found with XX chromosomes. These individuals were externally similar to males with XY chromosomes, but with much smaller testicles. Internally, the testicles were different in structure from the XY males', and the affected males were infertile. The authors of the 1988 paper believed this was the first instance of "sex reversal" found in mammals outside of captivity.
