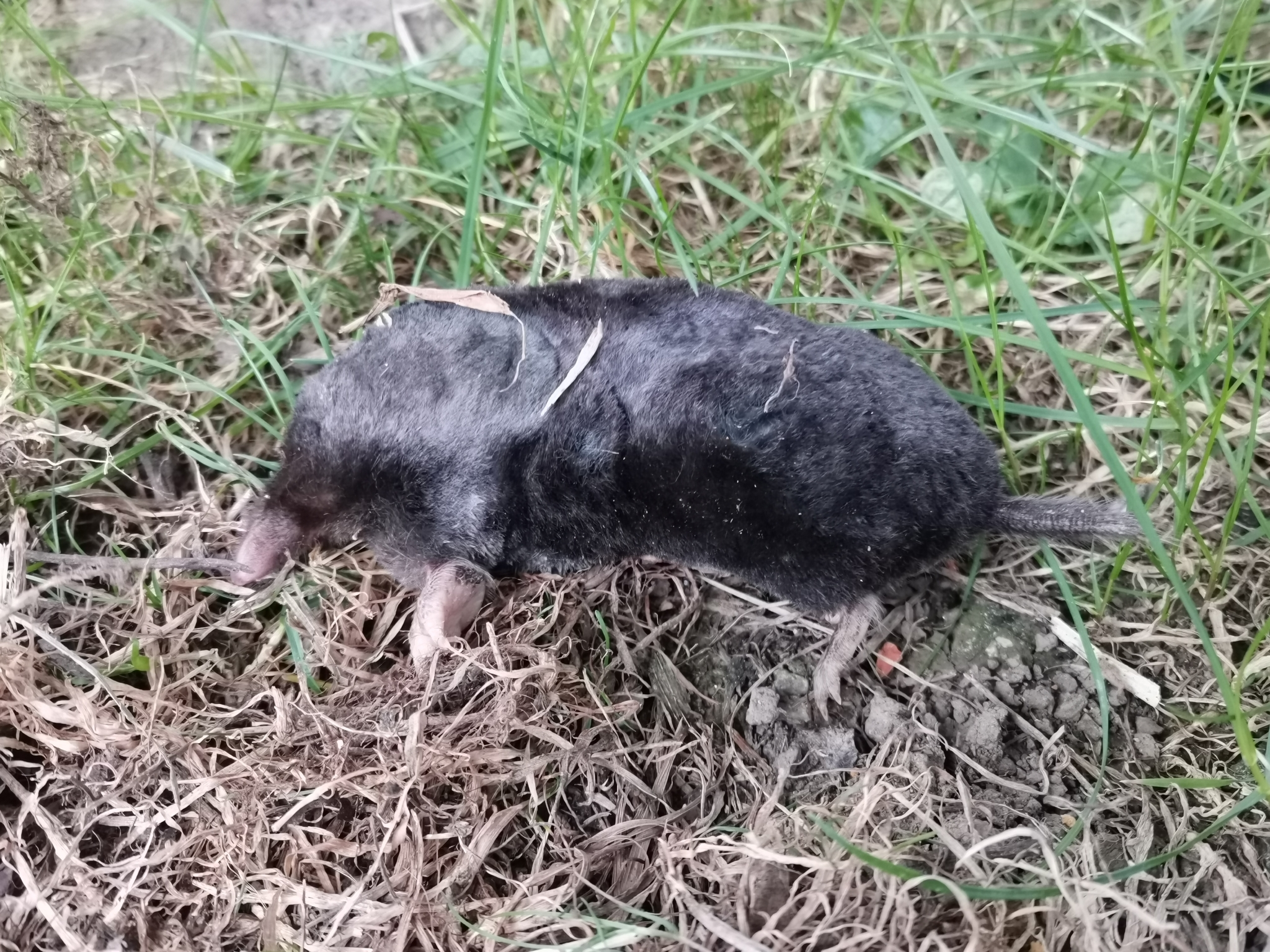

Conservation status
- Least Concern (IUCN 3.1)

Scientific classification
- Kingdom: Animalia
- Phylum: Chordata
- Class: Mammalia
- Order: Eulipotyphla
- Family: Talpidae
- Genus: Talpa
- Species: T. aquitania

Binomial name
- Talpa aquitania Nicolas, Martínez-Vargas, & Hugot, 2017
- Aquitanian mole range

= Aquitanian mole =

Species of mammal

The Aquitanian mole (Talpa aquitania) is a species of small burrowing mammal of the family Talpidae. It is found from the southwest of France to the north of Spain. Closely related to the European mole (T. europaea), this species was described in 2017, and it is difficult to distinguish the two species.

== Taxonomy ==
This species was described in 2017 by zoologists Violaine Nicolas, Jessica Martínez-Vargas and Jean-Pierre Hugot.

Its specific epithet, aquitania, means "Aquitaine", a former French region which is part of Nouvelle-Aquitaine, where it is most abundant.

== Distribution ==
It ranges from the southwestern region of France to the north of Spain. It is mainly distributed south and west of the Loire River, with the inverse being true for the European mole; however, this is not a strict barrier, as specimens of both species have been caught on opposite sides of the river from their main distribution, and thus they are likely sympatric in some areas.

== Description ==
The Aquitanian mole is very similar to the European mole, a mole with a much wider range. It can be distinguished unambiguously from the European mole and the Spanish mole (T. occidentalis) by the combination of the following characters:

- the eyelids are fused;
- the eyes are completely covered with a membrane, while the European mole has its eyes open;
- its head, body and hind legs are significantly larger in size;
- its weight is also heavier; its weight varies from 72 to 106 g (2.5 to 3.7 oz), the length of its head and body from 142 to 156 mm (5.6 to 6.1 in), its legs from 20 to 23 mm (0.79 to 0.91 in).

In addition, there are differences from these two species:

- at the dental level (M2 and M3 molars);
- from a genetic point of view (cytochrome b gene).
