= Père David's mole =

Conservation status
- Data Deficient (IUCN 3.1)

Scientific classification
- Kingdom: Animalia
- Phylum: Chordata
- Class: Mammalia
- Order: Eulipotyphla
- Family: Talpidae
- Genus: Talpa
- Species: T. davidiana

Binomial name
- Talpa davidiana (Milne-Edwards, 1884)
- Père David's mole range

Synonyms
- Talpa streeti Lay, 1965

Species of mammal

Père David's mole (Talpa davidiana) is a mole found in the Middle East, ranging from south-central Turkey east to Kurdistan Province, Iran, although it could also range south into Syria. It is listed as a data deficient species by the IUCN, as little is known about its population or habitat. The species is named after the zoologist Armand David. As T. streeti, a synonym, it is known as the Persian mole.

== Description ==
Père David's mole is a medium-sized mole, 128 millimetres (5.0 in) to 145 millimetres (5.7 in) long with a short tail. It weighs about 34.12 grams (1.204 oz) to 52.87 grams (1.865 oz). The fur is greyish-brown "with a noticeably silvery sheen" and a pink snout.

== Taxonomy ==
Père David's mole was first described in 1884 by Alphonse Milne-Edwards, as Scaptochirus davidianus . Milne-Edwards highlighted the small body size, the very short tail and the grey to black fur color as special features. The type specimen he based the description on was male, which Milne-Edwards said was found in the "aux environs d'Akbès, sur les confins de la Syrie et de l'Asie Mineure" ("environs of Akbes, at the border between Syria and Asia minor"). This is often equated with Meidan Ekbis in northern Syria, but due to its altitidue of only around 400 metres (1,300 ft) the region is considered rather unsuitable for the species. Some researchers therefore suspect that the type specimen originally came from higher elevations. Milne-Edwards may also have meant Akbez in the neighbouring province of Hatay, now in Turkey, whose surroundings are considerably more mountainous. The specimen was collected by Father Armand David, after whom the species was named.

The species was moved to the genus Talpa in 2001, and Talpa streetorum was synonymized with the species in 2005. T. streetorum was classified as a subspecies until a 2023 genetic analysis, which named a new subspecies T. d. tatvanensis, and split a new species Talpa hakkariensis from T. davidiana based on genetic data. T. d. tatvanensis is distinguished from the nominate subspecies, T. d. davidiana, by its lighter color and broader rostrum.
