= Talpa hakkariensis =

Scientific classification
- Kingdom: Animalia
- Phylum: Chordata
- Class: Mammalia
- Order: Eulipotyphla
- Family: Talpidae
- Genus: Talpa
- Species: T. hakkariensis

Binomial name
- Talpa hakkariensis Gündüz, Demirtaş, Silsüpür, Özmen, Polly, and Bilton, 2023

Species of mole

Talpa hakkariensis is a species of mole native to eastern Turkey. While it was first described in 2023, there is evidence that the species has existed for more than three million years. The species was described by a team of researchers from Indiana University, Ondokuz Mayıs University, and the University of Plymouth.

== Distribution ==
Talpa hakkariensis is found in mountains located in the Hakkâri region of Turkey. The species is able to endure temperatures up to 50 degrees Celsius.

== See also ==
- List of living mammal species described in the 2020s
