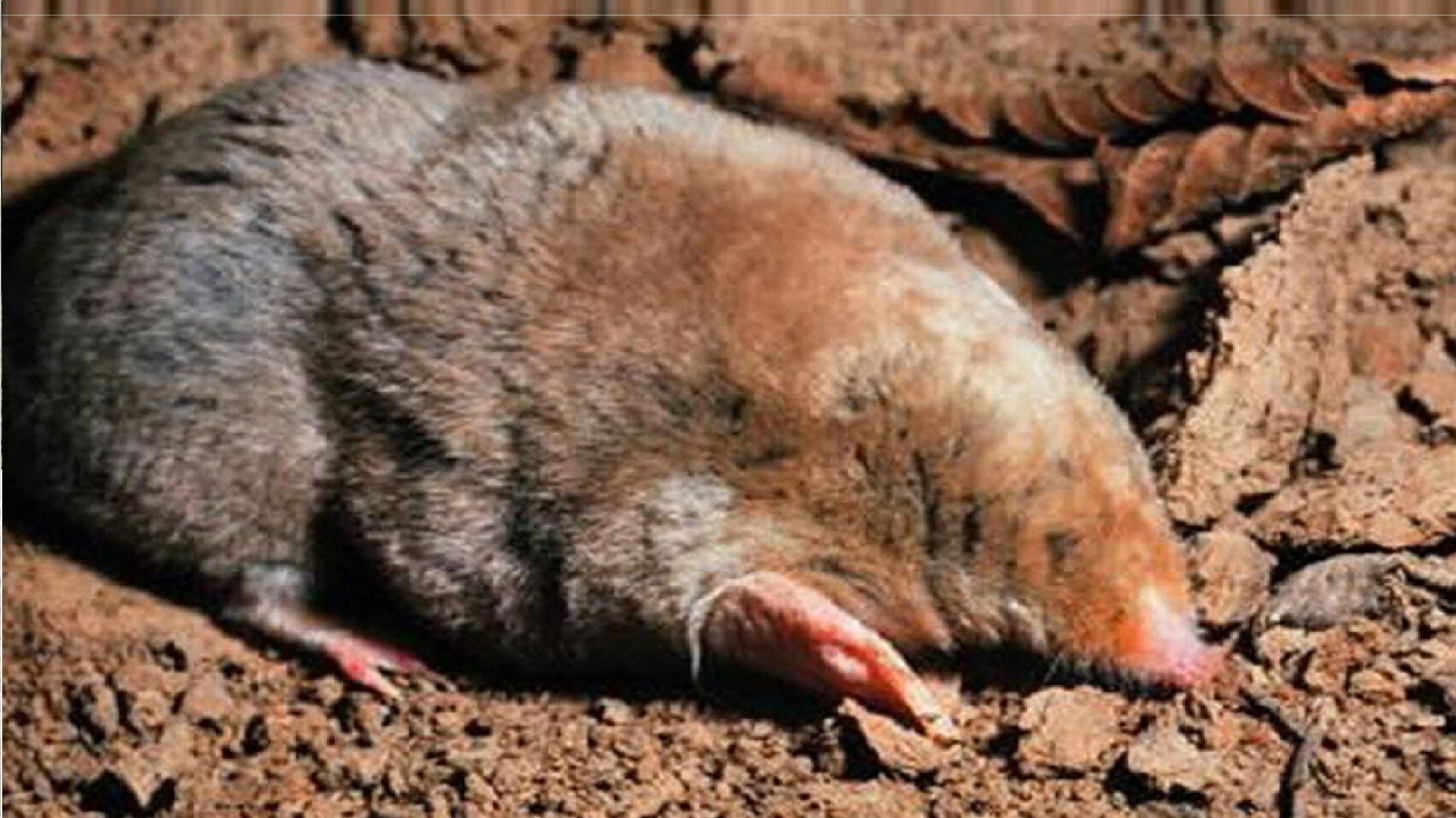

Conservation status
- Least Concern (IUCN 3.1)

Scientific classification
- Kingdom: Animalia
- Phylum: Chordata
- Class: Mammalia
- Order: Eulipotyphla
- Family: Talpidae
- Genus: Talpa
- Species: T. altaica

Binomial name
- Talpa altaica Nikolsky, 1883
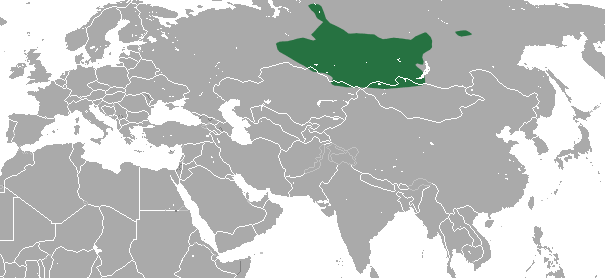
- Altai mole range

Synonyms
- Talpa gusevi (Fetisov, 1956); Talpa irkutensis Dybowski, 1922; Talpa saianensis Bielovusev, 1921; Talpa salairica Egorin, 1936; Talpa salairici Corbet, 1978; Talpa sibirica Egorin, 1937; Talpa suschkini Kastschenko, 1905; Talpa tymensis Egorin, 1937

= Altai mole =

Species of mammal

The Altai mole or Siberian mole (Talpa altaica) is a species of mole in the family Talpidae. It is found throughout the taiga zone of south-central Siberia in Russia, as far south as northern Mongolia and Kazakhstan.

This mole lives in forested habitat and feeds mainly on earthworms.

This is a common species. It is sometimes caught for its fur.
