= Niethammer =

Niethammer is a German surname. Notable people with the surname include:

- Barbara Niethammer (born 1967), German mathematician
- Friedrich Immanuel Niethammer (1766–1848), German theologian
- Günther Niethammer (1908–1974), German ornithologist
