= Talpa (mammal) =

Talpa Temporal range: Miocene to Recent
- European mole (Talpa europaea)

Scientific classification
- Kingdom: Animalia
- Phylum: Chordata
- Class: Mammalia
- Order: Eulipotyphla
- Family: Talpidae
- Tribe: Talpini
- Genus: Talpa; Linnaeus, 1758

Type species
- Talpa europaea Linnaeus, 1758

Species
- See text

Genus of mammals

Talpa is a genus in the mole family Talpidae. Among the first taxa in science, Carolus Linnaeus used the Latin word for "mole", talpa, in his Regnum Animale to refer to the commonly known European form of mole. The group has since been expanded to include 13 extant species, found primarily in Europe and western Asia. The European mole, found throughout most of Europe, is a member of this genus, as are several species restricted to small ranges. One species, Père David's mole, is data deficient. These moles eat earthworms, insects, and other invertebrates found in the soil.

The females of this genus have rudimentary male features such as Cowper's glands and a two-lobed prostate. A group of scientists has suggested that they are true hermaphrodites; however, others state that they are fully functional females.

There are 14 species in this genus:

- Altai mole, T. altaica
- Aquitanian mole, T. aquitania
- Blind mole, T. caeca
- Caucasian mole, T. caucasica
- Père David's mole, T. davidiana
- European mole, T. europaea
- T. hakkariensis Gündüz, Demirtaş, Silsüpür, Özmen, Polly & Bilton, 2023
- Levant mole, T. levantis
- Martino's mole, T. martinorum
- Spanish mole, T. occidentalis
- Ognev's mole, T. ognevi
- Roman mole, T. romana
- Balkan mole, T. stankovici
- Talysch mole, T. talyschensis

In addition, several extinct species are known from fossil remains, here the list:

- †Talpa tyrrhenica
- †Talpa fossilis Petenyi, 1864
- †Talpa praeglacialis Kormos, 1930
- †Talpa minor Freudenberg, 1914
- †Talpa vallesensis Villalta & Crusafont, 1944
- †Talpa episcopalis Kormos, 1930
- †Talpa gilothi Storch, 1978
- †Talpa minuta Blainville, 1840
- †Talpa gracilis Kormos, 1930
- †Talpa neagui Radulescu & Samson, 1989
- †Talpa tenuidentata Ziegler, 1990
- †Talpa sansaniensis Lartet, 1851

The current phylogeny of the species in the genus is shown below:

Phylogeny of the Eurasian moles according to Demırtaş et al. 2020

- - Talpa altaica
  - - Talpa ognevi
    - Talpa caucasica
- - - Talpa talyschensis
    - Talpa davidiana
  - - - Talpa caeca
      - Talpa stankovici
    - Talpa levantis
  - - Talpa romana
    - - Talpa martinorum
      - - - Talpa occidentalis
          - Talpa aquitania
        - Talpa europaea
