= Balkan mole =

Conservation status
- Least Concern (IUCN 3.1)

Scientific classification
- Kingdom: Animalia
- Phylum: Chordata
- Class: Mammalia
- Order: Eulipotyphla
- Family: Talpidae
- Genus: Talpa
- Species: T. stankovici

Binomial name
- Talpa stankovici V. Martino & E. Martino, 1931
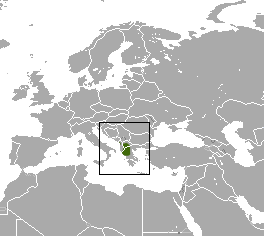
- Balkan mole range

Species of mammal

The Balkan mole (Talpa stankovici) is a species of mammal in the family Talpidae.

== Taxonomy ==
It was first described in 1931 as a subspecies of T. romana. It has two subspecies, T. s. stankovici (found in Macedonia and Greece) and T. s. montenegrina (found in Montenegro and Albania). Genetic analysis found that, despite the morphological similarities between T. stankovici and T. romana, T. stankovici is most closely related to T. levantis.

== Description ==
Males are 123 to 143 mm (4.8 to 5.6 in) with a 29 to 42 mm (1.1 to 1.7 in) tail; females are slightly smaller. Males weigh 61 to 96 g (2.2 to 3.4 oz), and weigh about 20% more than females. The Balkan mole has black fur and grey feet.

== Habitat and ecology ==
It feeds primarily on earthworms. Females give birth to 2-4 young in February and early March.

It is found in Montenegro, Albania, North Macedonia and Greece, including the island of Corfu, at elevations up to 2,300 metres (7,500 ft), in various types of open habitats. It is listed as a species of least concern by the IUCN Red List due to its wide range and lack of any significant threats.
