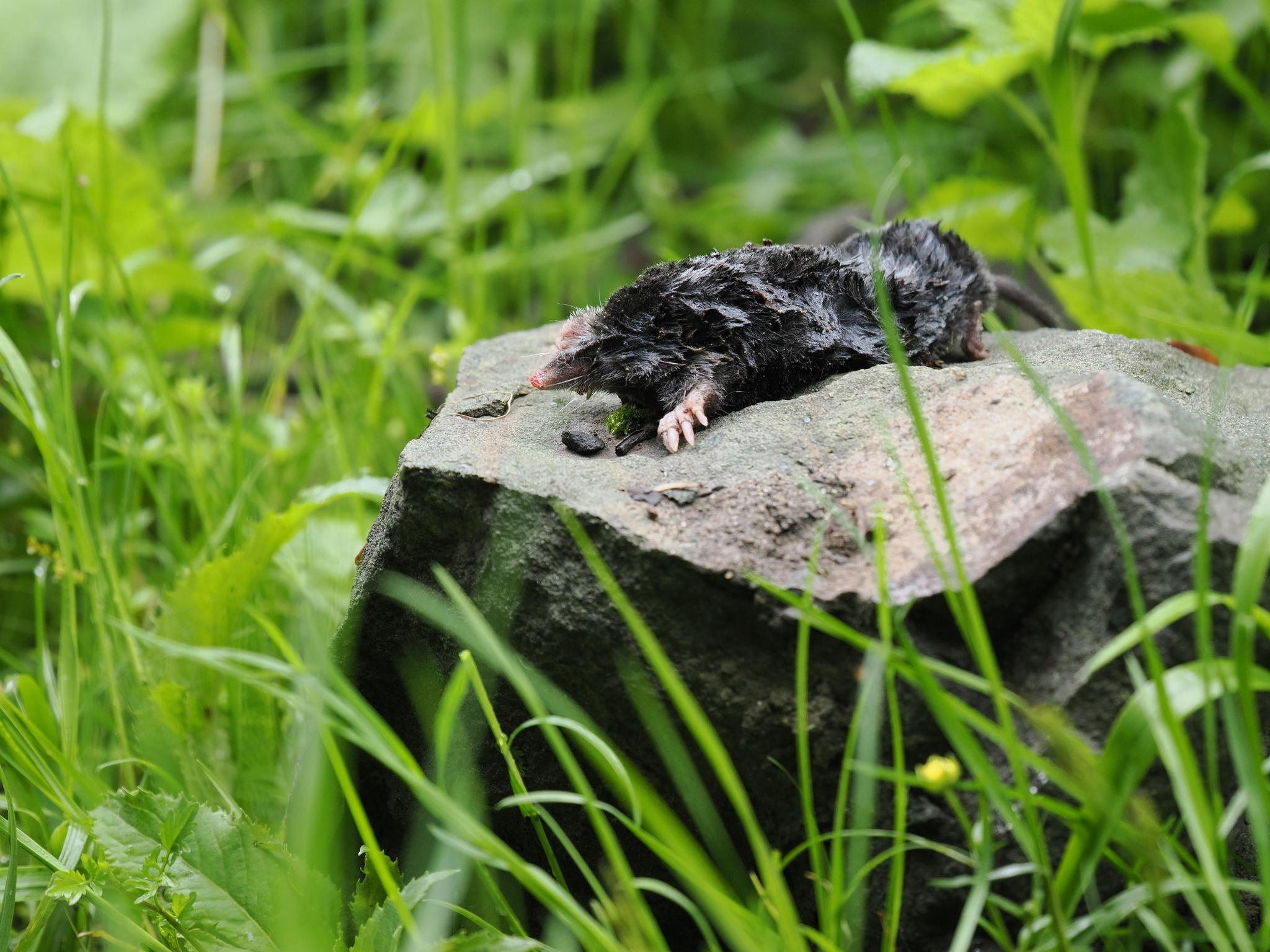

Conservation status
- Least Concern (IUCN 3.1)

Scientific classification
- Kingdom: Animalia
- Phylum: Chordata
- Class: Mammalia
- Order: Eulipotyphla
- Family: Talpidae
- Genus: Talpa
- Species: T. levantis

Binomial name
- Talpa levantis Thomas, 1906

Subspecies
- T. l. transcaucasica Dahl, 1944; T. l. dogramacii Kefelioğlu, 2020
- Range of T. l. levantis
- Range of T. l. transcaucasica

= Levant mole =

Species of mammal

The Levant mole (Talpa levantis) is a species of mammal in the family Talpidae.

== Taxonomy and evolution ==
The Levant mole was first described as a subspecies of Talpa caeca by Oldfield Thomas in 1906, and recognized as a full species in 1973 by Spitzenberg.

Moles in the genus Talpa are morphologically very similar to each other, which has made separating the species difficult before the wide availability of genetic analysis. The Talysch mole (T. talyschensis) was formerly considered a synonym of T. levantis, but more recent studies have found it to be distinct. A 2020 taxonomic analysis found three distinct genetic populations in the western, central, and eastern ends of its range, and separated them into three subspecies: Talpa levantis dogramacii (newly named in this study, after Salih Doğramacı), T. l. levantis, and T. l. transcaucasica. Based on genetic data, recent studies, including Demırtaş et al. (2020) and Gündüz et al. (2023) have separated the eastern subspecies of T. levantis as its own species, T. transcaucasica, the Transcaucasian mole.

A fossil example of T. levantis is known from Yarimburgaz Cave in Turkey, dated to the Middle Pleistocene.

== Description ==
The Levant mole is a small mole, 103 millimetres (4.1 in) to 149 millimetres (5.9 in) long. The eyes are covered with a layer of transparent skin, and the eyelids are permanently closed.

Unlike other species in the genus, it has 38 pairs of chromosomes.

== Distribution and habitat ==
The Levant mole lives in wet or damp soil, and can be found in both fields and forests. Including T. transcaucasica, it is found in Armenia, Azerbaijan, Georgia, Russia, and Turkey. If T. transcaucasica's separation is taken into account, then T. levantis is endemic to Turkey.
