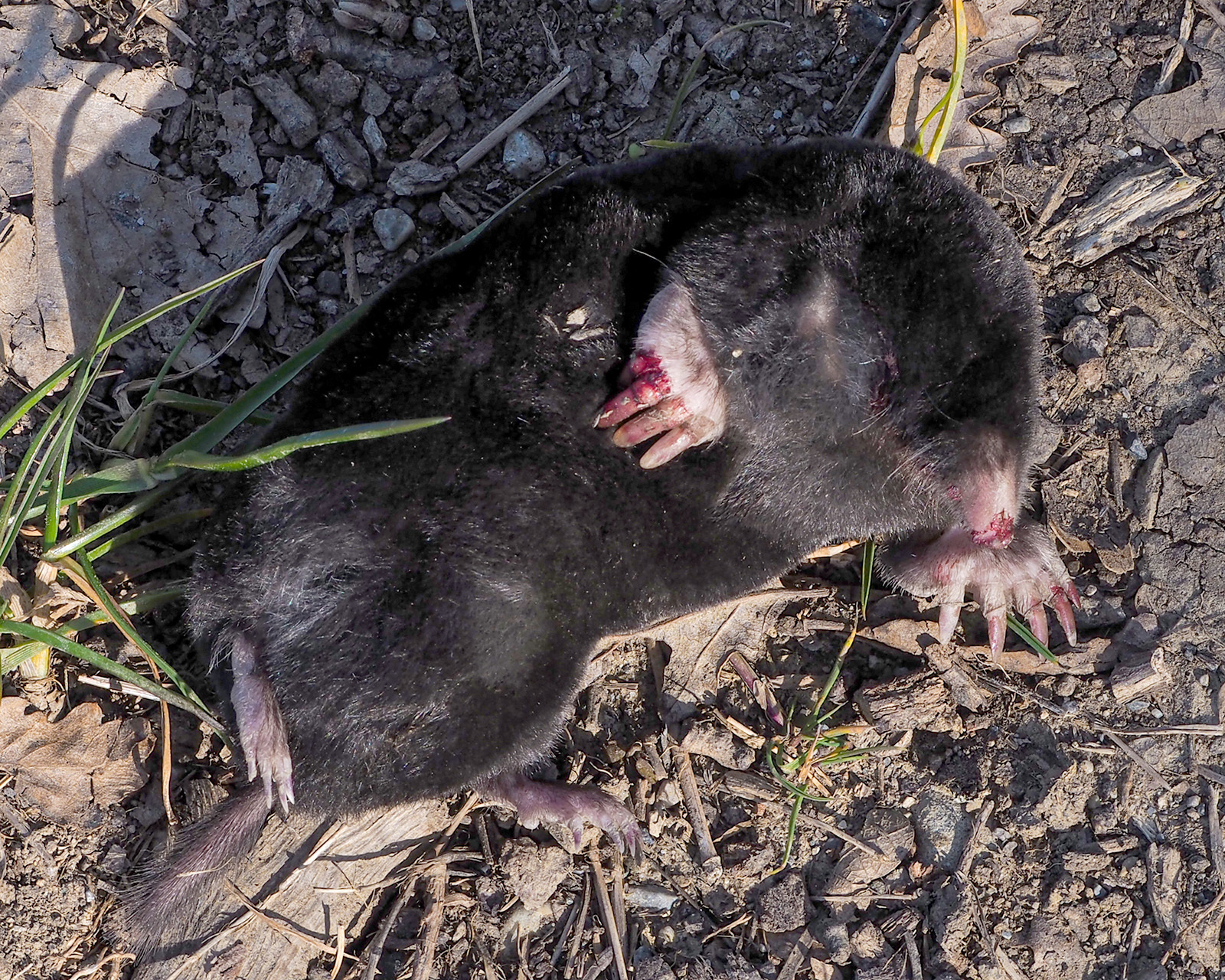

Conservation status
- Least Concern (IUCN 3.1)

Scientific classification
- Kingdom: Animalia
- Phylum: Chordata
- Class: Mammalia
- Order: Eulipotyphla
- Family: Talpidae
- Genus: Talpa
- Species: T. romana

Binomial name
- Talpa romana Thomas, 1902
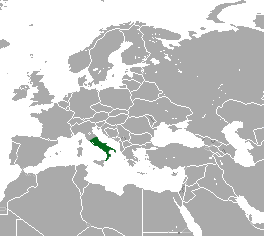
- Roman mole range

= Roman mole =

Species of mammal

The Roman mole (Talpa romana) is a species of mammal in the family Talpidae. It is endemic to central-southern Italy (from the province of Grosseto to the province of Ancona, south to southern Calabria). It was last recorded on Sicily in 1885. There is also an unconfirmed report about an isolated subpopulation in the Vars region of southern France.

== Taxonomy ==
Several subspecies of the Roman mole have been described based on differences in skull size: T. r. montana (found in Abruzzo and Molise), T. r. aenigmatica (formerly found in Sicily and now extinct), T. r. adamoi (found in south-central Calabria), and T. r. brachycrania (found in Lucania). However, the size of the skull appears to vary clinally from large in the north to smaller in the south, suggesting that the taxonomy of the species needs to be revised to more accurately understand geographic variation in its morphology.

== Description ==
The Roman mole is fairly large compared to other moles, with adults weighing up to 125 g.

== Distribution and habitat ==
The Roman mole is endemic to Italy, where it is found in the central and southern parts of the peninsula. It is locally extinct in Sicily, where it was last seen in 1885. The status of the population rumored to live in Vars in southern France is unconfirmed. The species is found in a wide variety of habitats, including dense forests, woodland, fields, pastures, grasslands, and olive groves, from sea level up to an elevation of 2,000 m.

== Biology ==
Like other moles, Roman moles live entirely underground in individual tunnel systems that they defend territorially. Males defend territories of 2–3 square kilometres normally and up to 7 square kilometres during the breeding season. Females defend territories of 1–2 square kilometres on average.

It feeds mainly on earthworms and insect larvae.

== Conservation ==
The Roman mole is listed as being of least concern on the IUCN Red List as it is fairly common throughout its range and is not thought to be declining fast enough to qualify for a threatened listing. It is less common than it was previously and may be experiencing local population declines in areas with heavy agricultural cultivation. It is also listed on Italy's national list of pests and persecuted widely, but this is unlikely to threaten the species. However, it is threatened by overuse of biocides and chemicals, as well as increasingly severe droughts caused by climate change, which can cause starvation. Previously the Roman mole was hunted for its fur, which was used to make gloves and raincoats, and hunting for this purpose continues. It inhabits several protected areas within its range.
