= European mole =

European mole Temporal range: Early Middle Pleistocene to recent 0.8–0 Ma

Conservation status
- Least Concern (IUCN 3.1)

Scientific classification
- Kingdom: Animalia
- Phylum: Chordata
- Class: Mammalia
- Order: Eulipotyphla
- Family: Talpidae
- Genus: Talpa
- Species: T. europaea

Binomial name
- Talpa europaea Linnaeus, 1758
- European mole range

Species of mammal

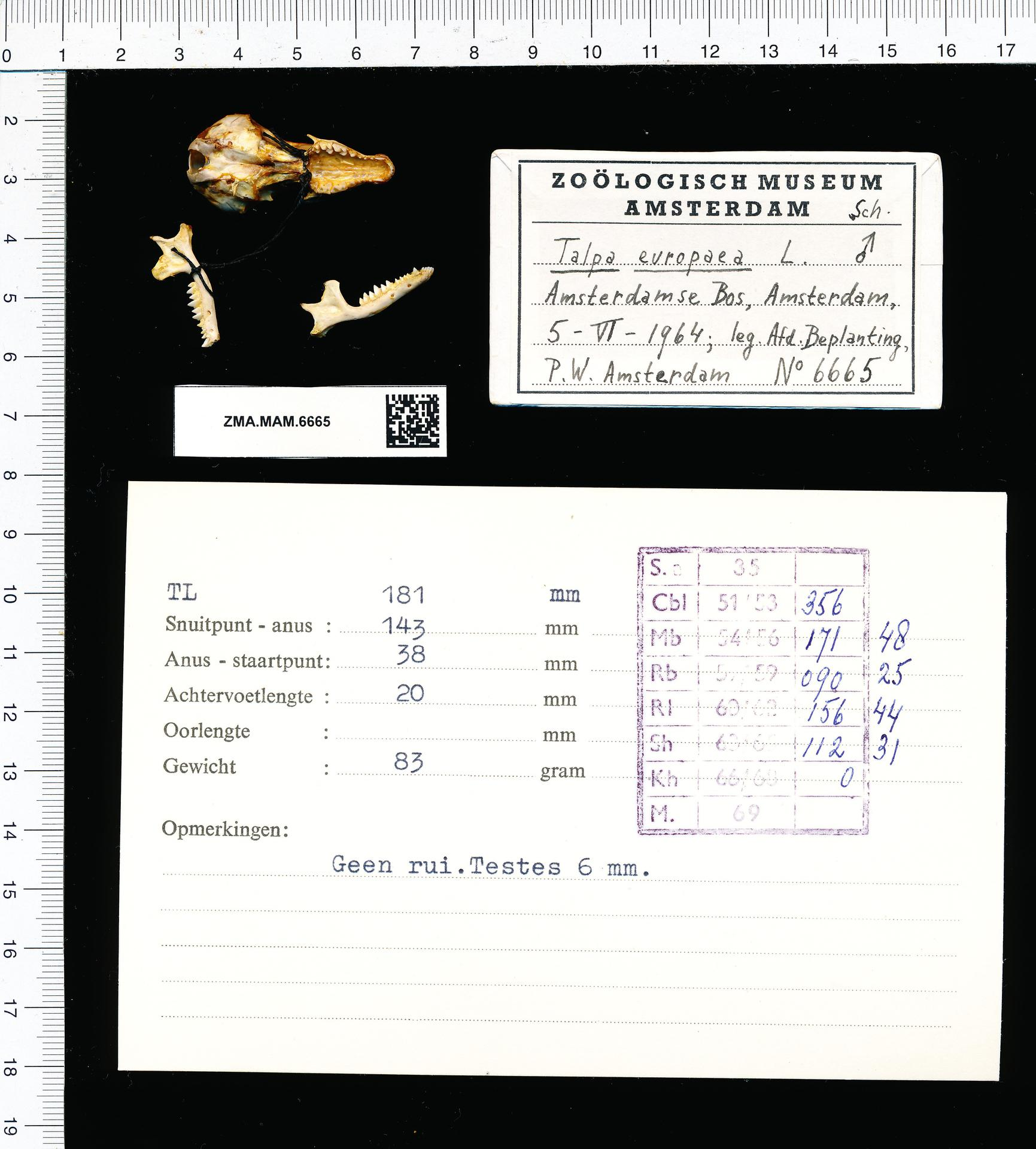
Preserved skull (1964)

The European mole (Talpa europaea) is a mammal of the order Eulipotyphla. It is also known as the common mole and the northern mole.

This mole lives in a tunnel system, which it constantly extends. It uses these tunnels to hunt its prey. Under normal conditions, the displaced earth is pushed to the surface, resulting in the characteristic molehills. It is an omnivore that feeds mainly on earthworms, but also on insects, centipedes and mammals such as rodents and other moles. Its saliva contains toxins which paralyse earthworms in particular.

== Taxonomy ==
The Aquitanian mole (T. aquitania) was formerly considered conspecific, but was described as a distinct species in 2017.

== Distribution ==
The European mole has a wide range throughout Europe and westernmost Asia, being found as far north as the United Kingdom and southern Scandinavia, as far south as northern Greece, and as far east as western Siberia. It is the only mole species in most of this range. The Loire River in France was thought to form the western barrier to the species' range, separating it from the Aquitanian mole, but studies indicate that while this is largely true, it is not a strict barrier, as member of either species have been found on opposite sides of the river, likely making them sympatric in at least some places. There are an estimated 35 to 40 million moles in the UK.

== Description ==
Skull of a European mole

The European mole has a cylindrical body and is 11 to 16 cm (4.3 to 6.3 in) long, weighing 70 to 130 g (2.5 to 4.6 oz). Females are typically smaller than males. The eyes are small and hidden behind fur, while the ears are just small ridges in the skin. The fur is usually dark grey, but the actual range of colours is larger, as due to the subterranean habits there is no disadvantage in having off-coloured fur. European moles with white, light grey, tan, taupe, and black fur have all been reported.

== Habitat ==
While moles are typically found in tunnel systems, the European mole is not exclusively an underground dweller. In the spring and early summer when the young moles leave their mothers' burrows they must find new territories. This forces them to leave their burrows and they can either make new tunnel systems or enter existing systems. In the summer time, however, they are likely to burrow much more superficially. The superficial burrowing could be due in part to the soil that is much harder, which makes burrowing a greater challenge.

T. europaea have also been found to spend a lot of time at the sides of drainage lines and streams but do not inhabit flooded or dry soils. However, dry areas do become important when their normal habitats become flooded. Factors such as the type of soil, vegetation present, and altitude have no effect on the areas that moles choose to inhabit. The one factor that does greatly influence the mole population in a specific area is the abundance of earthworms. In suitable urban greenspace, an area of 10 hectares is required for population persistence, and the number of mole territories increases with available habitat.

== Reproduction ==
The European mole has a relatively short breeding season, in the spring. Mating occurs over a span of a few weeks in March and April, followed by a gestation period of four to five weeks. Most births occur at the end of April or at the beginning of May. The litter size ranges from two to seven. The lactation period lasts for four to five weeks but at the end of June, the young are usually required to leave the tunnels. The lifespan is from three to five years.

== Feeding habits ==
One common belief about European moles is that they typically consume their own weight in food every 24 hours, but this is an exaggeration. Studies have been performed that show European moles eat about half of their body weight in food each day. When in captivity, European moles will eat a wide variety of food items, including liver, mice, mealworms, shrews and maggots. However, they tend to prefer earthworms over all other options. In areas without as many earthworms, insects are the main dietary constituent. Moles eat both larval and adult insects.

== Vision ==
Due to the subterranean nature of this mole, there is an anatomical regression of its eyes at several organisational levels. Its eye has a diameter of only 1 mm, it is buried beneath fur and has a cellular lens. The organisation of the retina is quite similar to that of a typical mammal. It has been determined that there are about 2000 ganglion cells and the optic nerve is roughly 50 μm with 3000 axons. Roughly 15% of these axons are myelinated. The photoreceptors are not the normal rod-like or cone-like shape that one would expect to see. Instead they all have one uniform shape with three distinct features:

1. The receptors are short along the radial axis
2. The inner and outer segments are similar in length
3. The outer segments appear to be significantly degenerated

Studies have shown that T. europaea does have photopic vision, contrary to popular belief that all moles are blind. Two cone opsins have been found in the eyes of T. europaea but their function is still under investigation. In a study of the mole eyes it was found that Talpa withdraws when exposed to a flashlight and it can also perform light/dark discrimination tasks. The cone cells in the eye are unlikely to provide high-resolution vision but they could allow a detection of movement and some hue discrimination. It is suggested that in subterranean mammals vision is used to detect predators that have broken into the tunnels.

== Hearing ==
In mammals, the cues for directional hearing are usually based on inter-aural intensity differences, which occur as a result of the diffraction of a progressive sound wave by the head and pinna. They could also be based on inter-aural time differences that are present because of the distance between their two ears. European moles have no pinnae, so they are thought to hear at low frequencies. In addition to this, their inner ear is unusual for that of a mammal, due to the large trabeculation of the posterior ventral skull between the ears. The tympana of the ear lies almost horizontally and the manubrial tips are separated by a distance of 8 mm (0.31 in). The results of several studies confirm that there is good transmission through the European mole's head for a range of low frequencies. Because of this it is expected that there will be acoustic interaction at each tympanic membrane. There are also suggestions that the ears of this mole act as balanced pressure-difference receivers. This system has never been suggested for a mammal in the past, but reptiles, amphibia, birds, and crickets have been shown to have a direct air pathway between the tympana.

== Skeletal development ==
In Talpa europaea, there are several unique changes in ossification sequence in the postcranial elements. Many of the shifts are seen in the vertebral column, specifically the cervical and thoracic regions. The shifts allow the moles to have a more stabilised body axis and cervical region after they are born.

After a European mole is born and begins to develop, it will begin to crawl around and dig. As a result of the constant digging action, elements of the forelimb that are associated with those movements will begin to ossify. Some elements in the hands of Talpa europaea, formally described as distal phalanges, are actually the first to ossify. These elements build up a groove for the distal phalanges, but ultimately do not fuse with them. These bony elements develop directly, meaning they do not have any cartilaginous precursors. The extra-calcified elements are created from small, calcified particles that are found in the fibrous part of the flexor digitorum profundus. The particles then fuse later in life to form the solid element of the hand. Additionally, the sesamoid bone in the European mole sensu stricto is a bone that develops within a tendon. It does have a chondrified precursor and it assists the tendon in transmitting force.

== Dentition ==
The variance of morphology between species is very important to paleontologists, as it can help define a fossil species. Unlike other characteristics that do not fossilise, like colour and karyotype, dentition can be studied, as it fossilises well and varies from species to species. Studying dentition can be very beneficial in recognising the differences between fossils and subsequently being able to classify them.

The Roman mole (Talpa romana) was once considered a subspecies of the European mole, as they are of similar size. The only obvious difference between the two is that T. romana has skin-covered eyes and it also has a caecoid pelvis, whereas T. europaea has a europoid pelvis. Although similar in body, the dentition of T. romana is obviously larger in size than that T. europaea. Both the length of the tooth row and the individual elements are larger. Moreover, the mesostyle of the upper molars is generally divided. The dentition of T. europaea is small and the length of M1-M3 is less than 19% of the length of the condyle base. This mole also has relatively small molars for its size.

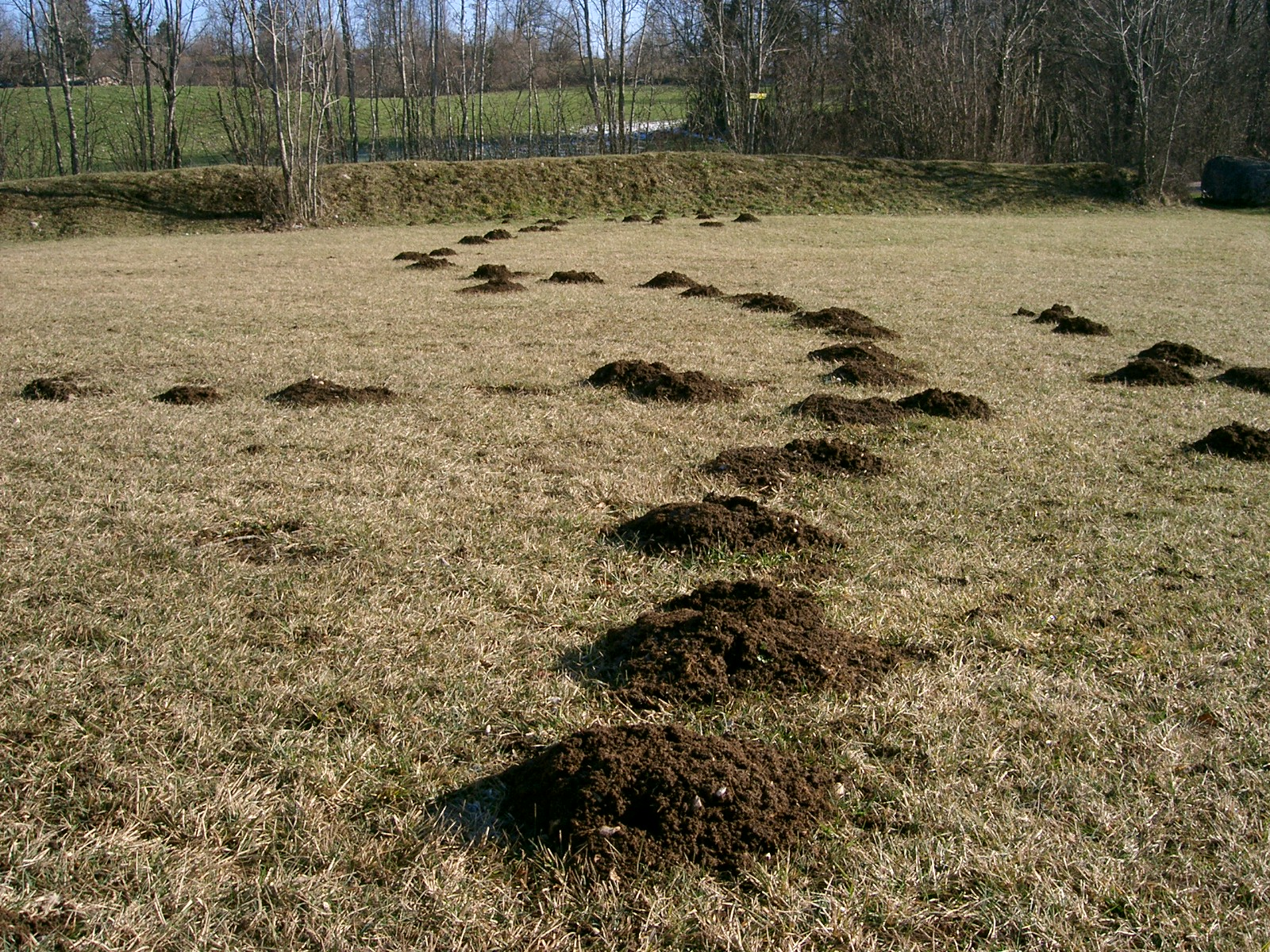
Molehills

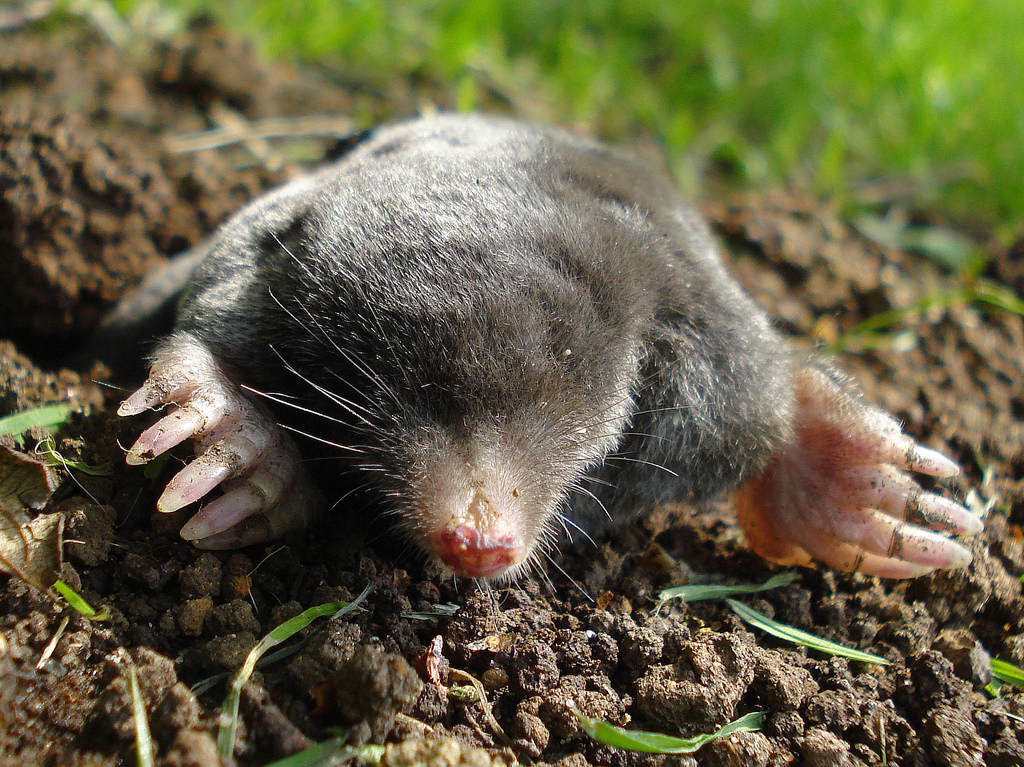
Portrait

Skeleton

An albino

== In popular culture ==
Some fictional works include anthropomorphic moles, for example The Little Mole. The Wind in the Willows featured a Mole as one of the main characters.

== See also ==
- Nova virus which was first isolated in European moles
