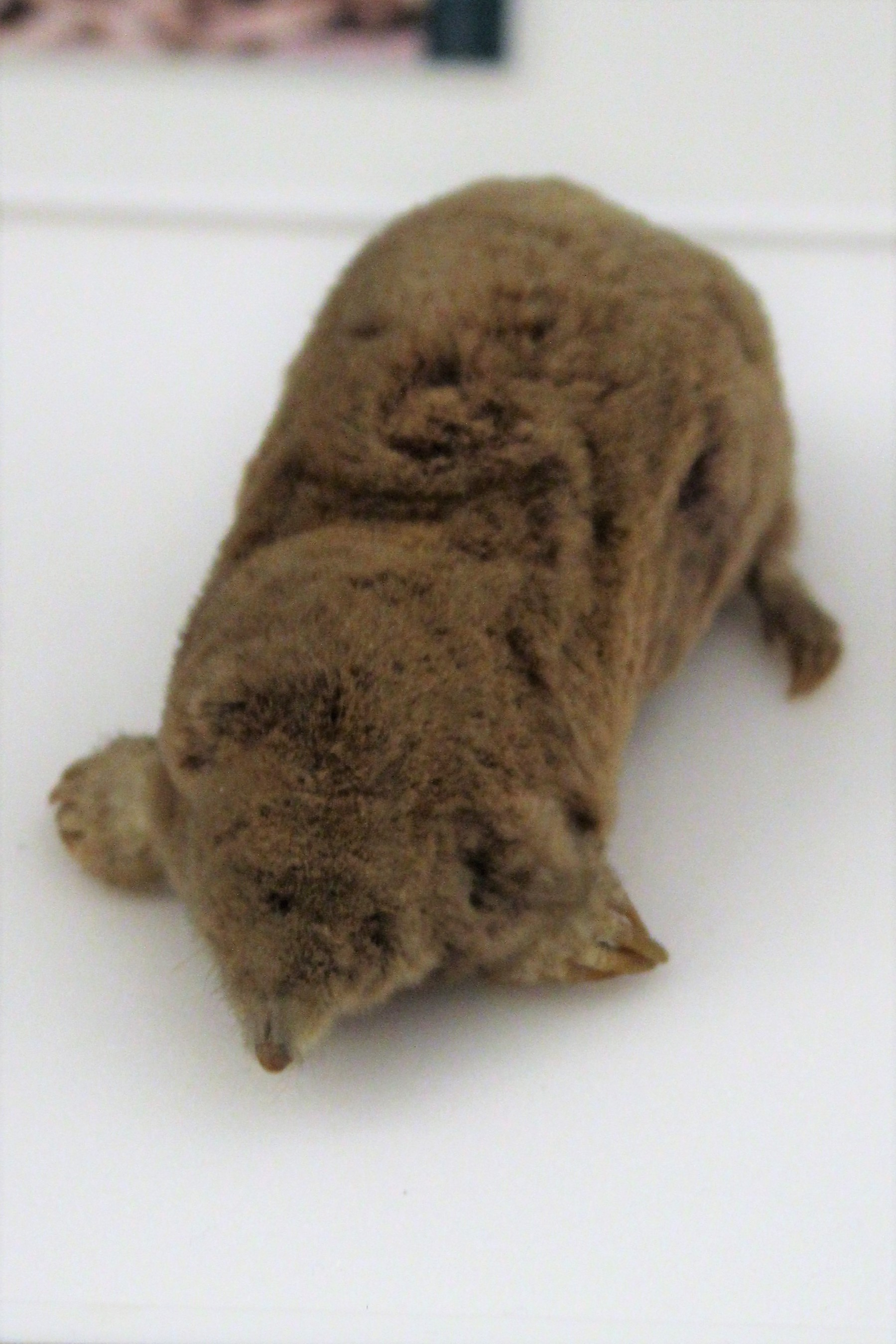
- Taxidermied blind mole at the Cambridge University Museum of Zoology, England.

Conservation status
- Least Concern (IUCN 3.1)

Scientific classification
- Kingdom: Animalia
- Phylum: Chordata
- Class: Mammalia
- Order: Eulipotyphla
- Family: Talpidae
- Genus: Talpa
- Species: T. caeca

Binomial name
- Talpa caeca Savi, 1822
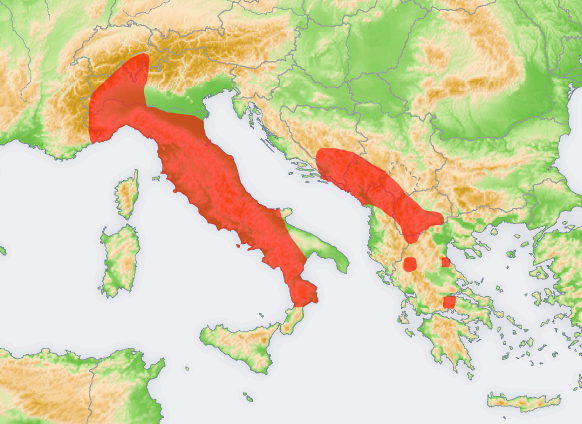
- Range map

= Blind mole =

Species of mammal

The blind mole (Talpa caeca), also known as the Mediterranean mole, is a mole found in the Mediterranean region. It is similar to the European mole, differing most prominently in having eyes covered with skin. It is found in Albania, France, Greece, Italy, Monaco, Montenegro, San Marino, Serbia, Slovenia, Switzerland, and Turkey. It is typically carnivorous in nature. Individuals can grow up to 12 cm (4.5 in) in length.
