= Bacteroides mediterraneensis =

Scientific classification
- Domain: Bacteria
- Kingdom: Pseudomonadati
- Phylum: Bacteroidota
- Class: Bacteroidia
- Order: Bacteroidales
- Family: Bacteroidaceae
- Genus: Bacteroides
- Species: B. mediterraneensis

Binomial name
- Bacteroides mediterraneensis Mailhe et al.

Species of anaerobic gut bacterium

Bacteroides mediterraneensis is a species of anaerobic, Gram-negative bacterium within the genus Bacteroides. It was first isolated from the human intestinal tract and is considered part of the gut microbiome. Like other members of the genus, it is involved in the breakdown of complex carbohydrates in oxygen-limited environments.

== Description ==
Cells of Bacteroides mediterraneensis are rod-shaped basilli, with an average length of approximately 0.9-2.3 micrometers in length and 0.6-0.7 micrometers in width. The organism is Gram-negative and lacks detectable catalase and oxidase activities.

Consistent with other members of the genus Bacteroides, B. mediterraneensis is an obligate anaerobe and is therefore restricted to growth in oxygen-free environments. Colonies are described as circular, translucent, and grey with a smooth appearance and these physiological characteristics reflect its adaptation to the conditions of the human intestinal tract.

== Classification and phylogeny ==
The evolutionary relationships of B. mediterraneensis have been analyzed using the 16S ribosomal RNA gene, a genetic marker widely used for bacterial identification and classification. Sequence comparisons show that it is closely related to other gut-associated species such as Bacteroides uniformis, Bacteroides vulgatus, and Bacteroides ovatus. Additional identification methods included MALDI-TOF (Matrix-Assisted Laser Desorption/Ionization Time-of-Flight) mass spectrometry and genome sequencing, which were used to analyze protein profiles and genetic characteristics of the isolate.

== Discovery and History ==
Bacteroides mediterraneensis was first described in 2016 by Mailhe and colleagues during a study of the human intestinal microbiome. The organism was isolated from an ileal sample obtained from a patient undergoing clinical evaluation following a positive colorectal cancer screening test.

Initial attempts to identify the bacterium using MALDI-TOF mass spectrometry were unsuccessful, because its protein profile did not match existing database entries. Because no match was found, the isolate was suspected to represent a previously undescribed species, and the bacterium was subsequently cultured under strictly anaerobic conditions to mimic the human gut environment.

Further characterization included microscopic observation, Gram staining, and biochemical testing. Definitive identification was achieved through sequencing of the 16S ribosomal RNA gene, which confirmed its placement within the genus Bacteroides while demonstrating sufficient genetic divergence to classify it as a novel species. Phylogenetic analysis further supported this classification, showing that B. mediterraneensis clusters closely with related Bacteroides species but remains genetically distinct.

== Metabolism ==
Bacteroides mediterraneensis obtains energy through fermentation, a metabolic process that occurs in the absence of oxygen. It is associated with the utilization of complex carbohydrates present in the human intestinal environment.

Members of the genus Bacteroides are known for their ability to degrade a wide range of complex polysaccharides derived from dietary and host sources. These processes involve coordinated systems of proteins and enzymes that bind, break down, and transport glycans into the cell.

During carbohydrate fermentation, metabolites such as short-chain fatty acids (SCFAs), including acetate and butyrate, are produced. These compounds are associated with physiological functions in the host, including maintenance of intestinal health and immune regulation.

== Genomics ==
Genomic analyses of Bacteroides mediterraneensis reveals a genome size of approximately 4.08 Mb with a GC content of about 47.47%. The genome contains several thousand predicted protein-coding genes and displays features consistent with other members of the genus Bacteroides.

Comparative genomic analysis indicates that genome size, gene content, and overall organization are similar to closely related Bacteroides species. Functional classification based on Clusters of Orthologous Groups (COGs) shows that genes are distributed across multiple metabolic and cellular processes.

Members of the genus Bacteroides are capable of degrading complex polysaccharides derived from dietary and host sources. Additional genetic features include genes associated with bile resistance and colonization of the gastrointestinal tract. Overall genome characteristics, such as size and GC content, are similar to those observed in other species within the genus Bacteroides.

== Ecology ==
Bacteroides mediterraneensis was isolated from a human ileal sample. The ileum is part of the gastrointestinal tract, an environment characterized by low oxygen availability and high microbial density. The species grows under anaerobic conditions, consistent with its occurrence in oxygen-limited environments such as the human gut.

Members of the genus Bacteroides are commonly associated with the human intestinal microbiota, where they persist in nutrient-rich and anaerobic conditions. These environments support the growth of microorganisms adapted to the degradation and utilization of complex organic substrates present in the gastrointestinal tract.

Although Bacteroides mediterraneensis has not been extensively studied, its classification within the genus Bacteroides suggests that it contributes to nutrient metabolism through the breakdown of complex carbohydrates using carbohydrate-active enzymes and polysaccharide utilization loci (PULs). These systems enable the degradation, transport, and fermentation of polysaccharides into metabolites such as short-chain fatty acids, while also providing substrates that support metabolic interactions and cross-feeding among other gut microorganisms.
