= Translatomics =

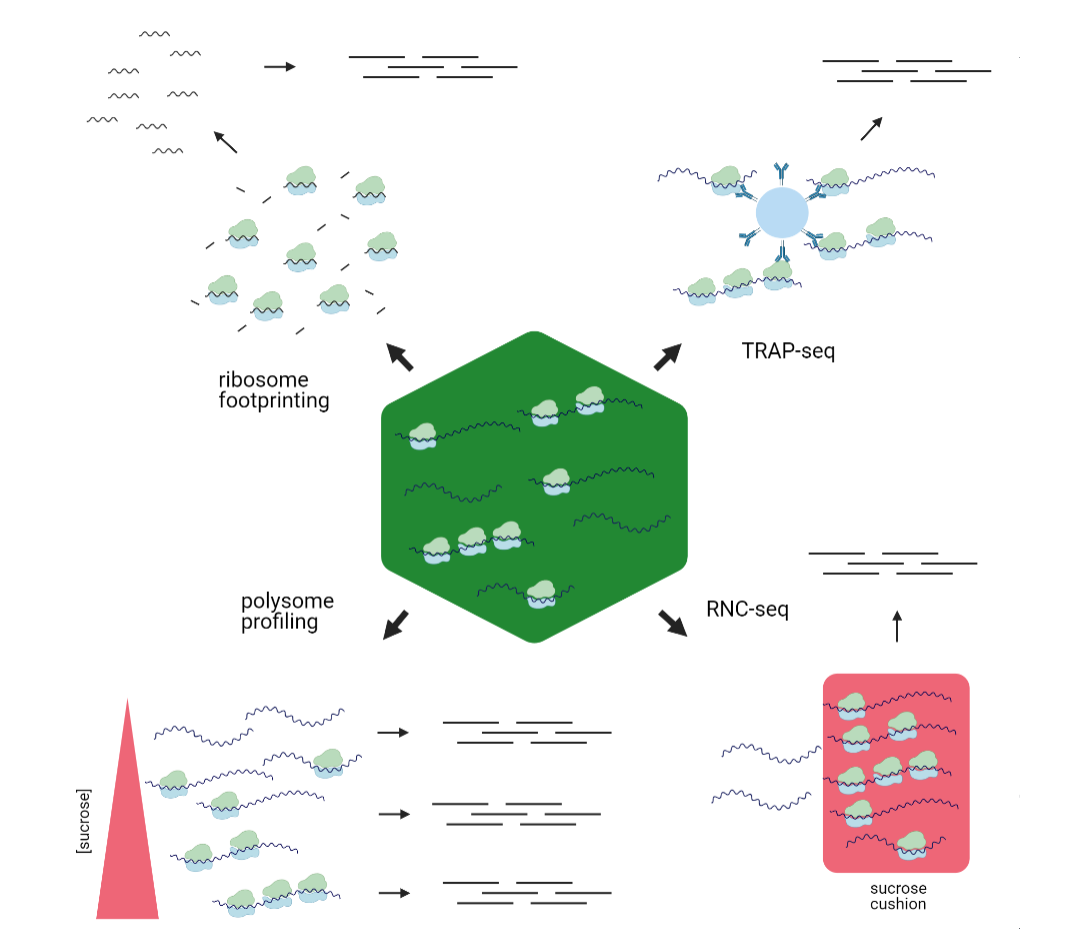
The translatome is characterized using polysome profiling, ribosome footprinting, TRAP-seq, RNC-seq, and other translatomics techniques.

Translatomics is the study of all open reading frames (ORFs) that are being actively translated in a cell or organism. This collection of ORFs is called the translatome. Characterizing a cell's translatome can give insight into the array of biological pathways that are active in the cell. According to the central dogma of molecular biology, the DNA in a cell is transcribed to produce RNA, which is then translated to produce a protein. Thousands of proteins are encoded in an organism's genome, and the proteins present in a cell cooperatively carry out many functions to support the life of the cell. Under various conditions, such as during stress or specific timepoints in development, the cell may require different biological pathways to be active, and therefore require a different collection of proteins. Depending on intrinsic and environmental conditions, the collection of proteins being made at one time varies. Translatomic techniques can be used to take a "snapshot" of this collection of actively translating ORFs, which can give information about which biological pathways the cell is activating under the present conditions.

Usually, the ribosome profiling technique is used to acquire the translatome information. Recent advancements, including single-cell ribosome profiling, have significantly improved the resolution of these studies, allowing researchers to gain insights into translation at the level of individual cells. This is particularly important for heterogeneous cell populations, where overall bulk measurements may mask important cell-to-cell differences in protein synthesis. Other methods are polysome profiling, full-length translating mRNA profiling (RNC-seq), and translating ribosome affinity purification (TRAP-seq). Unlike the transcriptome, the translatome is a more accurate approximation for estimating the expression level of some genes, since the correlation between the proteome and translatome is higher than the correlation between the transcriptome and proteome.

== History ==
Nearing the completion of the Human Genome Project, the field of genetics was shifting its focus toward determining the functions of genes. This involved cataloguing other collections of biological materials, like RNA and proteins in cells. These collections of materials were called -omes, evoking the widespread excitement surrounding the sequencing of the human genome. The term translatome was first proposed in 2001 by Greenbaum et al. The translatome was intended to describe the relative quantities of proteins in a proteome. The term translatome now generally refers to the collection of proteins actively being created in a cell. Translatomics, in combination with degradomics, aims to describe the net change to the proteome under different conditions.

== Relevance and contribution to omics ==
The aim of genomics is to study the genome, or the collection of genetic material in an organism. Genomics subfields, or other -omics, such as Transcriptomics and proteomics, aim to characterize genome function by quantifying products of the genome (such as RNA and proteins) under different conditions. In doing so, omics gain insight into different levels of regulation of gene expression and are therefore genome function. However, these fields characterize biomolecules that have already been formed. In some cases, RNA or protein abundance does not reflect function because these biomolecules may be degraded rapidly, or they may remain in a cell long after they are initially synthesized. When using proteomics techniques to study the proteome, regulation of protein abundance at the level of post-translational modification and protein degradation may obscure earlier regulatory processes. Because cellular functions are often regulated at the level of translation, meaning the transcriptome does not always reflect genome function, using translatomics techniques to study the translatome may allow one to observe regulation of genome function that would be obscured in transcriptomics or proteomics studies.

== Methods ==
=== Translating mRNA ===
Most translatomics techniques focus on characterizing the mRNAs that are complexed with ribosomes and therefore being translated.

==== Polysome profiling ====
Polysome profiling is a technique used to characterize the degree of translation of one or more mRNAs. A highly translated mRNA exists as a polysome, meaning it is complexed with multiple ribosomes. mRNAs translated at lower levels are complexed with fewer ribosomes. In polysome profiling, a sucrose gradient is used to separate molecular complexes in a cell lysate based on size. The fractions from the column are analyzed by sequencing or other methods. The translation rate of mRNAs is determined based on their detection and abundance in the fractions of lower and higher molecular weight.

==== RNC-seq ====
The full length translating mRNA (RNC-seq) involves centrifugation of lysated sample on a sucrose cushion. This allows separation of the Ribosome-nascent chain complex(RNC) from free mRNA and other cell components. The RNCs form a pellet in the centrifugation that is collected for further analysis. The mRNA being translated in these RNCs can be sequenced, allowing identification and quantification of the mRNAs being translated at the time. However, RNC-mRNA complexes are fragile, which can lead to ribosomes to dissociate from the mRNAs and degradation of the mRNAs, potentially biasing the collected results.

==== Ribo-seq/Ribosome profiling/Ribosome footprinting ====
In Ribosome profiling, cellular mRNA including, polysomes, is subjected to ribonucleases, enzymes that cleave RNA. Those positions in the RNA molecules that are bound by ribosomes are protected against digestion. After cessation of ribonuclease activity, these protected sites can be recovered and sequenced. The sequences obtained from ribo-seq, therefore, represent fragments of mRNAs that were being actively translated.

==== TRAP-seq ====
TRAP-seq is used to identify mRNAs being actively translated in a specific cell type within a tissue or other assortment of cells. The cell type of interest is engineered to express a ribosomal subunit fused to an epitope tag such as green fluorescent protein. After cell lysis, antibodies targeting the epitope are used to isolate mRNAs that are bound to the ribosomes containing the fusion proteins. This RNA is then converted to cDNA and sequenced. This technique specifically identifies mRNAs that are being translated in the cell type of interest.

=== Nascent Polypeptides ===
==== Folding States ====
===== Mass Spectrometry =====
Mass spectrometry methods are unable to determine the folding of nascent polypeptides. No current methods examine the folding states of nascent polypeptides globally in the cell. There are methods for examining the folding state of individual nascent polypeptides.

One method uses a nonspecific protease to cleave the nascent peptide at a low temperature. The protease can cleave the unfolded, flexible regions, but cannot cut tightly folded regions. The products of the cleavage can then be separated and studied to determine the folded regions of the nascent peptide.

===== Nuclear Magnetic Resonance =====
To analyze the full structure of a nascent polypeptide, nuclear magnetic resonance (NMR) is used. NMR allows a dynamic view of molecules in solution and so can be used on ribosome-nascent chain complexes (RNC). Labelling of ribosomes allows the NMR data to be filtered for suspected ribosome signal and identify the signal of the nascent polypeptide.

==== Identification and Quantification ====
While the structure of nascent polypeptides is currently unexaminable on a global scale, identification and quantification are not.

===== Stable Isotope Labeling by Amino Acids in Cell Culture =====
One method uses a variant of Stable isotope labeling by amino acids in Cell Culture (SILAC). SILAC labels proteins with stable isotopes to allow quantification, comparing labelled and unlabeled peptides for quantification. Pulse SILAC (pSILAC) only allows peptides created during the pulse to be labelled. In theory, this allows a capture of only nascent peptides for quantification. SILAC, however, requires similar levels of labelled and unlabelled proteins for accurate quantification. As such, pSILAC pulses have to run much longer than the translation process, making quantification of nascent peptides inaccurate.

===== Bio-Orthogonal/Quantitative Non-Canonical Amino acid Tagging =====
Bio-Orthogonal/Quantitative Non-Canonical Amino acid Tagging (BONCAT/QuaNCAT) uses azidohomoalanine (AHA) to tag proteins. This allows isolation of newly created proteins for MS. However, using AHA requires predepletion of intracellular methionine and introduction of AHA, stressing the cell and potentially altering translation dynamics within. Similar to pSILAC, AHA methods require longer pulses, thus limiting their efficacy in quantifying nascent peptides.

===== Puromycin-associated nascent chain proteomics =====
Puromycin-associated nascent chain proteomics (PUNCH-P) uses a puromycin-biotin label to capture nascent polypeptides for MS. Though it does not disturb the cell process, it is less sensitive than other methods in detecting nascent peptides. In addition to these quantification methods, other MS based methods are being worked on.

=== mRNA Degradation ===
Degradation of mRNA also plays an important part in regulating the translation process.

To explore mechanisms of decay, genome-wide mapping of uncapped and cleaved transcripts (GMUCT), parallel analysis of RNA ends (PARE), and degradome sequencing use the T4 ligase of the Illumina sequencing platform to sequence decapped mRNAs. T4 ligase ligates to RNA with a free 5' monophosphate. As mature mRNAs have a 5' cap, they are not bound as substrates, leaving decapped and degrading mRNAs to be bound.

5′-monophosphorylated ends sequencing (5Pseq) captures both capped and decapped sequences to allow sequencing of both mature mRNA and degraded products. This helps identify mRNA degradation products and has uses in studying ribosome stalling.

These methods study 5' to 3' degradation, miRNA-mediated cleavage, and nonsense-mediated mRNA decay, but cannot measure 3' to 5' degradation and other degradation mechanisms.

=== In Vivo Translation Tracking ===
The techniques above require lysis of cells and thus cannot be performed in living cells. Single-molecule fluorescence resonance energy transfer (smFRET) and Nascent chain tracking (NCT) use fluorescence to track translational activity. Both methods track elongation rates of the polypeptides on single mRNAs. Neither technique, however, is capable of high throughput.

== tRNAome ==
Transfer RNA (tRNA) is an important part of Translation. tRNAs read the mRNA, bringing the amino acids the ribosome assembles into a polypeptide. As such, the abundances and types of tRNAs hava a large effect on the speed of protein synthesis. tRNAs can be very similar to other tRNAs, with some tRNA species only differing by a single nucleotide. This, coupled with similar secondary and tertiary structures, makes separating different tRNA species difficult.

=== Gel Electrophoresis ===
2D-Gel electrophoresis is a classic method used in separating tRNAs. Initially, the tRNAs are denatured in 7M urea and separated in the first gel dimension. 4M urea allows partial refolding for additional separation in the second gel dimension. This method has allowed separation into 48 sets in E. coli and 30 in B. subtilis but has limited resolution. Large numbers of different tRNA species cannot be fully separated by 2D-gel electrophoresis, with only 62 spots found for the 269 rat tRNAs.

=== Liquid Chromatography ===
High-performance liquid chromatography can be used to separate tRNAs based on aminoacylated tRNA isoacceptors. This method cannot fully separate the tRNA species and cannot distinguish between codons, though it still can find quantitative differences between different cell lines.

=== Mass Spectrometry ===
Mass spectrometry (MS) can be used to separate tRNAs based on unique endonuclease digestion products. This, however, has limited resolution with mixtures of 30 tRNA species and needs fractionation prior to MS in larger groups of tRNA. It also cannot be used to identify deNovo tRNA species as it requires prior knowledge of the digestion patterns of tRNA species.

=== Microarrays ===
Hybridization-based microarrays use the 3'CCA conserved sequence in tRNAs to attach a fluorescent probe. 70-80 nucleotide long probes, covering the length of the tRNA, are then used to bind tRNAs. tRNAs with at least 8 base differences are able to be distinguished with microarrays, but tRNAs with smaller differences bind to the same probe.

=== Quantitative Reverse Transcription ===
Quantitative reverse transcription, real time PCR (qRT-PCR) is another way for identifying and quantifying the tRNAome. A primer for the conserved 3'CCA sequence is used for priming reverse transcription for all tRNA species. Heavy modification of the tRNA nucleotides and the stability of the tRNA molecule can be an issue, so high temperatures and demethylation have been used to counter these. Demethylation has also been used to counteract the errors heavy methylation induces in sequencing.

=== Ribo-seq-like ===
Ribo-tRNA-seq has been developed to observe the role of tRNA more closely in translation. Similar to Ribo-seq, Ribo-tRNA-seq captures tRNA molecules in ribosomes for library preparation before sequencing.

== See also ==
- Degradomics
- Proteomics
- Translatome
