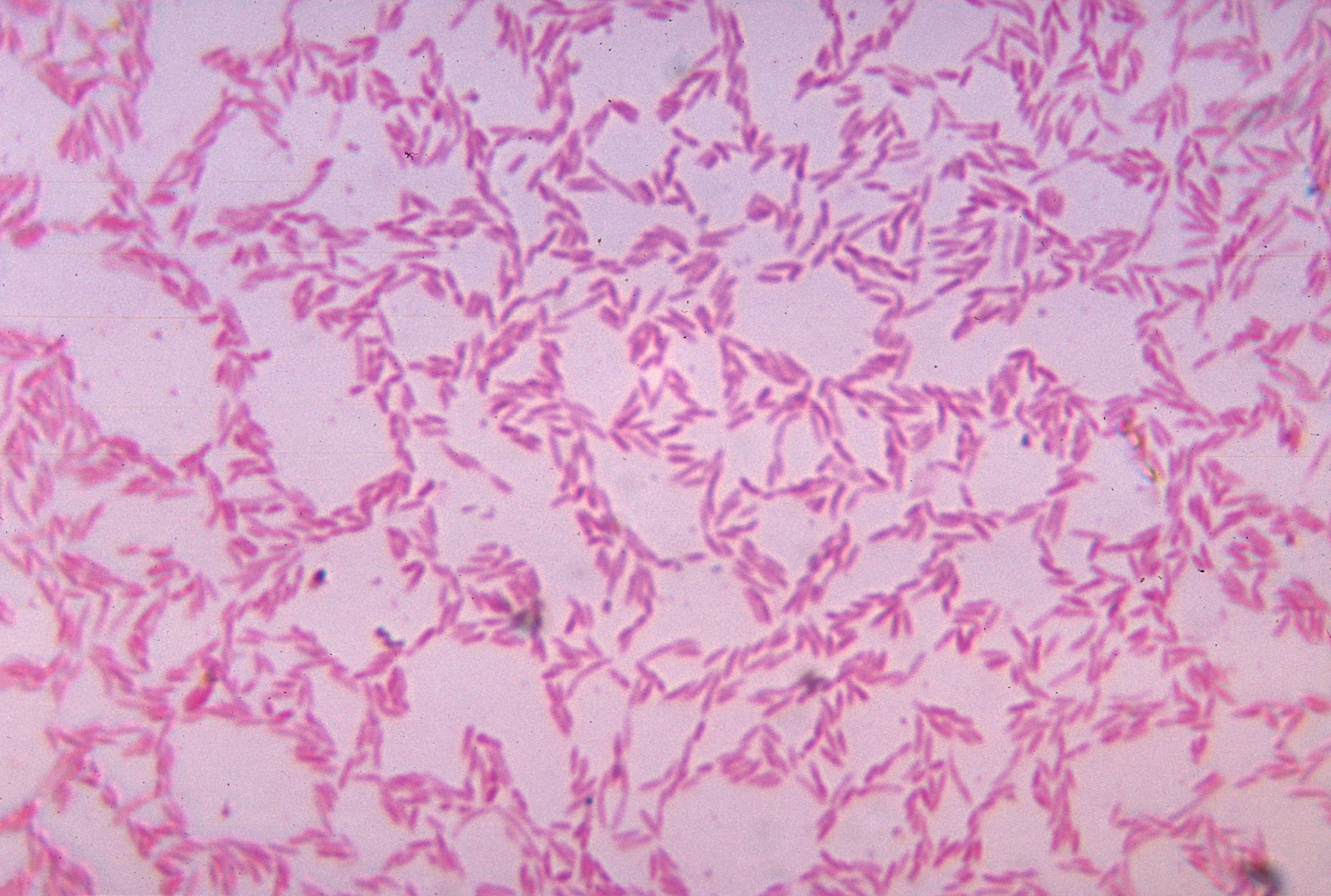

Scientific classification
- Domain: Bacteria
- Kingdom: Pseudomonadati
- Phylum: Bacteroidota
- Class: Bacteroidia
- Order: Bacteroidales
- Family: Bacteroidaceae
- Genus: Phocaeicola
- Species: P. vulgatus

Binomial name
- Phocaeicola vulgatus García-López et al. 2020

= Phocaeicola vulgatus =

Species of bacteria

Phocaeicola vulgatus, (formerly Bacteroides vulgatus), is a mutualistic anaerobic Gram negative rod bacteria commonly found in the human gut microbiome and isolated from feces. P. vulgatus has medical relevance and has been notable in scientific research due to its production of fatty acids, potential use as a probiotic, and associations with protecting against and worsening some inflammatory diseases. Due to the difficulties in culturing anaerobic bacteria, P. vulgatus is still highly uncharacterised so efforts are being made to make use of multi-omic approaches to investigate the human gut microbiome more thoroughly in hopes to fully understand the role of this species in the development of and protection against diseases, as well as its potential uses in medicine and research. Generally, P. vulgatus is considered as a beneficial bacteria that contributes to digestion and a balanced microbiome, but it has been known to cause opportunistic infections and induce or worsen inflammatory responses. Due to its abundance in the microbiome, some researchers are investigating these species in hopes that it will be a suitable model organism for gut microbiome research, like Bacteroides thetaiotaomicron.

== History ==
P. vulgatus was first described in 1932 by Arnold H. Eggerth and Bernard H. Gagnon. In this study, it was recognised that P. vulgatus was very common compared to other species isolated from human feces, and made up the majority of the isolates in this study.

== Diversity ==
=== Phylogeny and taxonomy ===
P. vulgatus belongs to the Bacteroidaceae family and was formerly considered to be part of the Bacteroides genus, but was reclassified in 2020 to the Phocaeicola genus. This was due to phylogenetic analysis suggesting it to be more closely related to the Phocaeicola genus than to B. fragilis. B. barnesiae, B. caecicola, B. caecigallinarum, B. chincillae, B. coprocola, B. coprophilus, B. dorei, B. gallinaceum, B. massiliensis, B. paurosaccharolyticus, B. plebeius, B. salanitronis, B. sartorii were all reclassified to Phocaeicola at the same time. P. vulgatus is often hard to distinguish from its close relative P. dorei through matrix-assisted laser desorption/ionization identification, so 16S sequencing is used.

The name Phocaeicola was first proposed in 2009 when a bacterium known as Phocaeicola abscessus was isolated from the brain of a man from the town Foça, which was known as Phocaea in the 11th century BC. The name vulgatus comes from Latin, meaning common or popular.

=== Type strain ===
The type strain for this species is Phocaeicola vulgatus ATCC 8482.

== Biology and biochemistry ==
P. vulgatus does not form spores and is able to grow in mesophilic conditions (37 °C), it is an anaerobe with a DNA GC content of around 41–42%. P. vulgatus is one of the more predominant species in the Bacteroidaceae family, which are one of the five main genera in the human gut microbiome, Bacteroidaceae make up around 30% of fecal isolates. P. vulgatus is found globally and most samples have been isolated from humans. P. vulgatus has more rarely been isolated from companion animals like dogs and cats, and also from sewage, sediment, farms, and plants.

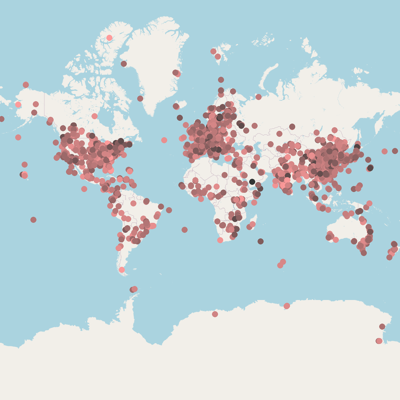
Global distribution of 16S sequence AB510712 Phocaeicola vulgatus subclade from BacDrive, made with Microbeatlas 1.0

=== Structure and metabolism ===
P. vulgatus is a Gram negative rod bacterium. The structure and metabolism of P. vulgatus is still not fully understood, but it is known that P. vulgatus is indole and urea negative and is capable of growing on a range of sugars, the most notable carbon source being glucose. A nitrogen source is also required, with its preferred source being ammonia. In regards to its cell membrane, the species has a lipopolysaccharide structure consisting of a mix of penta- and tetra-acylated mono-phosphorylated molecules, and P. vulgatus produces RagB/SusD protein which is an outer membrane family of proteins involved in bacterial nutrient uptake.

=== Culturing ===
P. vulgatus is a biosafety level 1 organism that can be grown in anaerobic laboratory conditions at 37 °C with a growth time of 1–2 days. P. vulgatus can be exposed to 0.03% dissolved oxygen with no effect on growth, and it is believed that anaerobes like P. vulgatus possess specific mechanisms to survive or cope with small levels of oxygen in the environment. A variety of liquid and solid media can be used to grow P. vulgatus; some of these include chopped meat medium supplemented with haemine 5 μg/ml and vitamin K1, Columbia blood medium, fastidious anaerobe broth, brain heart infusion medium, and tryptone yeast extract with glucose. Anaerobic bacteria like P. vulgatus are normally grown in an anaerobic chamber, glove box or anaerobic jar, or with the use of Hungate tubes, syringes, and resazurin oxygen indicator. The addition of vitamin B12 and NaHCO_{3} helps ensure cell survival.

== Genomics ==
=== Genome ===
The genome of P. vulgatus is around 5 Mbp in length.

=== Plasmids ===
Some strains of P. vulgatus and its close relative P. dorei have been known to carry a plasmid (called pBUN24) of around 9 kbp which is the vector for its toxin, BcpT. A version of this plasmid is also found in B. uniformis at around 90% similarity. Some cases have seen this plasmid present in isolates of P. vulgatus, B. intestinalis, and P. distasonis from the same individual, suggesting that the plasmid is mobilisable between multiple species of bacteria.

The plasmid pBI143 is mobilisable to P. vulgatus. This plasmid was first identified in 1985 in Bacteroides fragilis.

== Role in the gut microbiome ==
P. vulgatus seems to be present from early in an individual's development, and abundance is affected by type of diet the neonate has – formular or milk. Studies suggest that P. vulgatus is important in breaking down the complex carbohydrates in breast milk and therefore may be more abundant in babies who are breastfed. Infants as young at 2 months have been found to have species of Bacteroidaceae in their fecal microbiome.

P. vulgatus becomes more abundant as a human ages and will be involved in breakdown and digestion of other foods in the human diet, as well as the production of important molecules needed by the human body. It is capable of degrading complex heteropolysaccharides, like xylan into small chain fatty acids to be used in the human body. P. vulgatus also possess the ldh gene, which codes for the production of D-lactate dehydrogenase, an enzyme that is responsible for the conversion of lactate into pyruvate. These are important metabolic fuels for the function of mitochrondria in cells in the body. P. vulgatus is also known to produce acetate, and succinate from hexose sugars as well as being involved in synthesising vitamins and bioactive compounds.

=== Antibacterial toxin ===
This bacteria likely has a very complex role in the microbiome and interacts with many of the species present. Exposure to treatment that lowers the abundance of E. coli and C. sporogenes increases abundance of P. vulgatus. P. vulgatus produces an antibacterial protein called BcpT which is encoded on a small conjugative plasmid. This protein's receptor is Lipid A-core glycan which is found in other Bacteroidales families. The protein has a unique structure, unlike other characterised toxin proteins and it requires a two site cleavage to activate its antibacterial activity. Due to this, it is suggested to be a newly identified family of antibacterial toxins found in the gut microbiome. Bacteria will often produce toxins like these in order to pose a threat to other bacteria competing for the same niche, in doing this they will kill or inhibit growth of these competitors, and therefore gain the nutrients and habitats

== Role in disease ==
=== Ulcerative Colitis ===
Higher levels of dipeptides and oligopeptides have been observed in fecal samples from ulcerative colitis patients, and are believed to be due to an overproduction of proteases from P. vulgatus and related species. In a study looking at investigating this observation by investigating the transepithelial electrical resistance, which is a reliable method for testing the integrity of a cell monolayer, in the presence of these peptides from P. vulgatus. They saw that mouse epithelial layer integrity was lower in the presence of the proteases from P. vulgatus, hinting to damage of the intestinal wall, and saw that this was significantly reduced when a protease inhibitor was given to the mouse. Other work has seen similar results to this in rats. Ulcerative colitis has also been seen to be induced more severely in guinea pigs exposed to both P. vulgatus and carrageenan, a polysaccharide found in red seaweed that is known to induce inflammation and worsen symptoms of ulcerative colitis, animals exposed to just P. vulgatus showed no signs of ulcerative colitis unless exposure was daily, in which smaller signs of inflammation were observed in the epithelium.

While some research has shown P. vulgatus plays a role in worsening symptoms of ulcerative colitis, a study expanding on previous findings that E. coli Nissle could act as a probiotic, protecting against ulcerative colitis, found that P. vulgatus had the same impact as E. coli Nissle and reduced diseases expression in IL-2-/- mice

=== Obesity ===
P. vulgatus is reported to be a member of the healthy microbiota, preventing obesity phenotypes from worsening in some studies

=== Type 2 diabetes ===
A 2025 study identified that P. vulgatus is a key factor in reducing the effectiveness of metformin treatment of type 2 diabetes. Researchers determined that patients who did not respond well to metformin had significantly higher abundance of P. vulgatus in their gut microbiome, which interfered with the drug's action by altering bile acid metabolism and promoting a buildup of ceramides in the liver. Ceramides impair mitochondrial function, therefore diminishing metformin's glucose-lowering effects. The study suggests that targeting P. vulgatus by antibiotics or improving mitochondrial function by supplements like adenosylcobalamin (vitamin B12) could improve treatment outcomes.

== Role in biotechnology ==
While P. vulgatus does prefer anaerobic conditions, it is capable of surviving exposure to oxygen for short periods of time., and is known to produce very little gas during growth, the gas it produces is hydrogen. Due to its low hydrogen production, P. vulgatus has been used in developing gas production measuring systems in biotechnology, allowing for testing the lower detection limits of gas sensors
