= Phocaeicola coprocola =

Scientific classification
- Domain: Bacteria
- Kingdom: Pseudomonadati
- Phylum: Bacteroidota
- Class: Bacteroidia
- Order: Bacteroidales
- Family: Bacteroidaceae
- Genus: Phocaeicola
- Species: P. coprocola

Binomial name
- Phocaeicola coprocola (Kitahara et al. 2005) García-López et al. 2020

Synonyms
- Bacteroides coprocola

Species of bacterium

Phocaeicola coprocola is an anaerobe, Gram-negative, rod-shaped bacterium, which was first isolated from the feces of a healthy human. P. coprocola is not only prevalent in the human gut but also a dominant taxon in the gut microbiome of koalas (Phascolarctos cinereus).

== Structure ==
Phocaeicola coprocola cells are strictly anaerobic, non-motile, non-spore-forming, and Gram-negative. The incubation period for this bacterium is 2-3 days and its optimum growth temperature is around 37°C.

Cells are rod-shaped, 0.8μm wide and generally 1-4μm long. When cultivated on EG blood agar plates, P. coprocola colonies are disc-shaped and of greyish-white color. All strains of this species grow in the presence of bile and produce acid from glucose, maltose, lactose, salicin, and sucrose. No indole, catalase, or urease are produced.

== Pathology ==
Phocaeicol coprocola has been shown to be a part of the core microbiota of patients with gout, a common form of arthritis. It is suggested that the bacterium might be involved in functions such as one-carbon metabolism, nucleotide binding, purine biosynthesis, and amino acid biosynthesis.

Phocaeicol coprocola has also been linked to chronic liver diseases, such as metabolic dysfunction-associated steatotic liver disease (MASLD), which often progresses to liver fibrosis. Not only do patients with MASLD tend to have a lower abundance of P. coprocola, which suggests that the bacterium might be negatively correlated with the severity of the disease, but the bacterium has also been observed to exert protective effects against MASLD and liver fibrosis. P. coprocola seems to ameliorate diet-induced liver injury.
