= Phocaeicola dorei =

Scientific classification
- Domain: Bacteria
- Kingdom: Pseudomonadati
- Phylum: Bacteroidota
- Class: Bacteroidia
- Order: Bacteroidales
- Family: Bacteroidaceae
- Genus: Phocaeicola
- Species: P. dorei

Binomial name
- Phocaeicola dorei (Bakir et al. 2006) García-López et al. 2020

Anaerobe

Phocaeicola dorei is an anaerobe, Gram-negative, non-spore-forming, non-motile bacterium that was first isolated from human faeces. P. dorei is a very common and abundant member of the human gut microbiome; it specifically plays an important role in the microbiome of infants. In vaginally delivered infants, the bacterium colonises the gut soon after birth. Abundance further increases after the introduction of solid foods. For infants delivered through Caesarean section, the colonization of P. dorei is delayed; it can take up to 18 months for the abundance to match that of vaginally delivered infants.

== Genetics ==
The bacterium is closely related, and often confused with Phocaeicola vulgatus because of their mass spectra similarity, although P. dorei has a larger genome. P. dorei has an open pan-genome, which means it has a high degree of genome plasticity and adaptability.

== Pathology ==
P. dorei has been associated with a reduction of cholesterol, an improvement of influenza symptoms, and an improvement of atherosclerosis. Instead of being associated with the entire species, these beneficial effects are associated with specific strains of P. dorei: using alternative strains could cause the opposite effect. Several studies have discovered an associated between P. dorei and metabolic and immunological conditions, such as type one diabetes.

=== MASLD and liver fibrosis ===
The metabolites P. dorei produces have been shown to improve the progression of metabolic dysfunction-associated steatotic liver disease (MASLD) by regulating bile acid, lipid accumulation, inflammation, and proliferation. P. dorei has also been shown to attenuate liver fibrosis through the suppression of neutrophil, macrophage infiltration, and the disruption of efferocytosis. The bacterium could therefore, potentially, be used for microbiota-based therapeutic strategies against MASLD and cholestatic liver fibrosis.
