= Bacteroides caccae =

Scientific classification
- Domain: Bacteria
- Kingdom: Pseudomonadati
- Phylum: Bacteroidota
- Class: Bacteroidia
- Order: Bacteroidales
- Family: Bacteroidaceae
- Genus: Bacteroides
- Species: B. caccae

Binomial name
- Bacteroides caccae Johnson et al. 1986

Species of bacterium

Bacteroides caccae is a saccharolytic gram-negative bacterium from the genus Bacteroides. They are obligate anaerobes first isolated from human feces in the 1980s. Prior to their discovery, they were known as the 3452A DNA homology group. The type strain is now identified as ATCC 43185.

== Cell morphology and physiology ==
Bacteroides caccae is a saccharolytic anaerobic, nonmotile Gram-negative bacteria. They have a DNA GC content of 40-46 mol %. Growth occurs at human temperature (37 °C) under anaerobic conditions. There is no growth at 25 °C or 45 °C. Its cell shapes are rods that are 1.4-1.6 by 2.5-12 μm in size. The rods are found in single cells or in pairs. In a broth culture mixed with a fermentable carbohydrate, the cells will appear vacuolated or beaded. The surface colonies of cells grown on BHI blood agar plates following 48 hours of incubation show a circular cell of 0.5–1 mm in diameter. In addition, colonies are convex, gray, translucent, shiny, and smooth. Growth on rabbit blood shows slight hemolysis. In glucose broth, the cultures appear turbid with a smooth sediment and a final pH range of 5 – 5.2.

The type strain reduces neutral red but does not produce hydrogen sulfide. Growth on peptone-yeast extract-glucose broth cultures with 20% bile yields vast amounts of acetate and succinate but minor amounts of propionate and isovalerate. Lactate and threonine are not used by the type strain. B. caccae produces a trace amount of (0.1%) of hydrogen. They hydrolyze esculin, weakly digest gelatin, and are susceptible to chloramphenicol and clindamycin, but not susceptible to penicillin G and tetracycline.

== Pathogenicity ==
For the onset of intestinal bowel diseases (IBD) such as Crohn's disease (CD) or Ulcerative colitis (UC), commensal enteric bacteria are generally required as a pathogenic factor. B. caccae contains a TonB-linked outer membrane protein called OmpW that has only been characterized in this particular strain. The OmpW protein contains features similar to a bacterial TonB-linked outer membrane protein which allows the bacteria to increase its ability of iron or vitamin uptake in an environment where it lacks these variables. The TonB-linked outer membrane protein contains a TonB box that is highly conserved and also present in OmpW. OmpW may play a role in facilitating the organism's ability to uptake substrates that are important for commensal bacterial survival in the intestine. The immunological finding of OmpW is an elevation of anti-OmpW IgA levels in some patients with Crohn's disease in comparison to these IgA levels in patients with ulcerative colitis or healthy subjects. More remains to be elucidated on its potential pathogenicity with regards to OmpW. In addition, B. caccae has also been found in cultures from infections in the appendix and the abdomen (peritoneal)

== Metabolism ==
Bacteroides caccae was specified as being a fiber-degrading microbial specialist in the microbiomes of Western individuals. In a study geared at determining the fermentation of pectin in B. caccae from a rabbit cecum, it was determined that cultures grown with pectin produced more acetate than formate, lactate, fumarate, and succinate as opposed to those cultures grown on glucose which yielded vast amounts of lactate. This elucidates the metabolism of a plant fiber by a human commensal. In addition, B. caccae showed no growth on arabinan (a pectin), arabinoxylan (wheat), xylan, xyloglucan, glucomannan, galactomannan, B-glucan, lichenin, and laminarin. They do grow on host-derived glycans like neutral mucin O-glycans, chondroitin sulfate, and hyaluronic acid. The monosaccharides that induce growth are arabinose, fructose, fucose, galactose, galacturonic acid, glucose, glucuronic acid, glucosamine, mannose, N-acetylgalactosamine, N-acetylglucosamine, N-acetylneuraminic acid, rhamnose, ribose, and xylose
