= Bacteroides-1 RNA motif =

RNA structure in bacteria

Bacteroides-1 RNA
- Consensus secondary structure of Bacteroides-1 RNAs

Identifiers
- Symbol: Bacteroides-1
- Rfam: RF01694

Other data
- RNA type: sRNA
- Domain: Bacteroides
- PDB structures: PDBe

The Bacteroides-1 RNA motif is a conserved RNA structure identified in bacteria within the genus Bacteroides. The RNAs are typically found downstream of (in the possible 3′ UTRs) of genes that participate in the synthesis of exopolysaccharides of unknown types. It is possible that Bacteroides-1 RNAs regulate the upstream genes, but since this mode of regulation is unusual in bacteria, it is more likely that the structure functions as a non-coding RNA.
