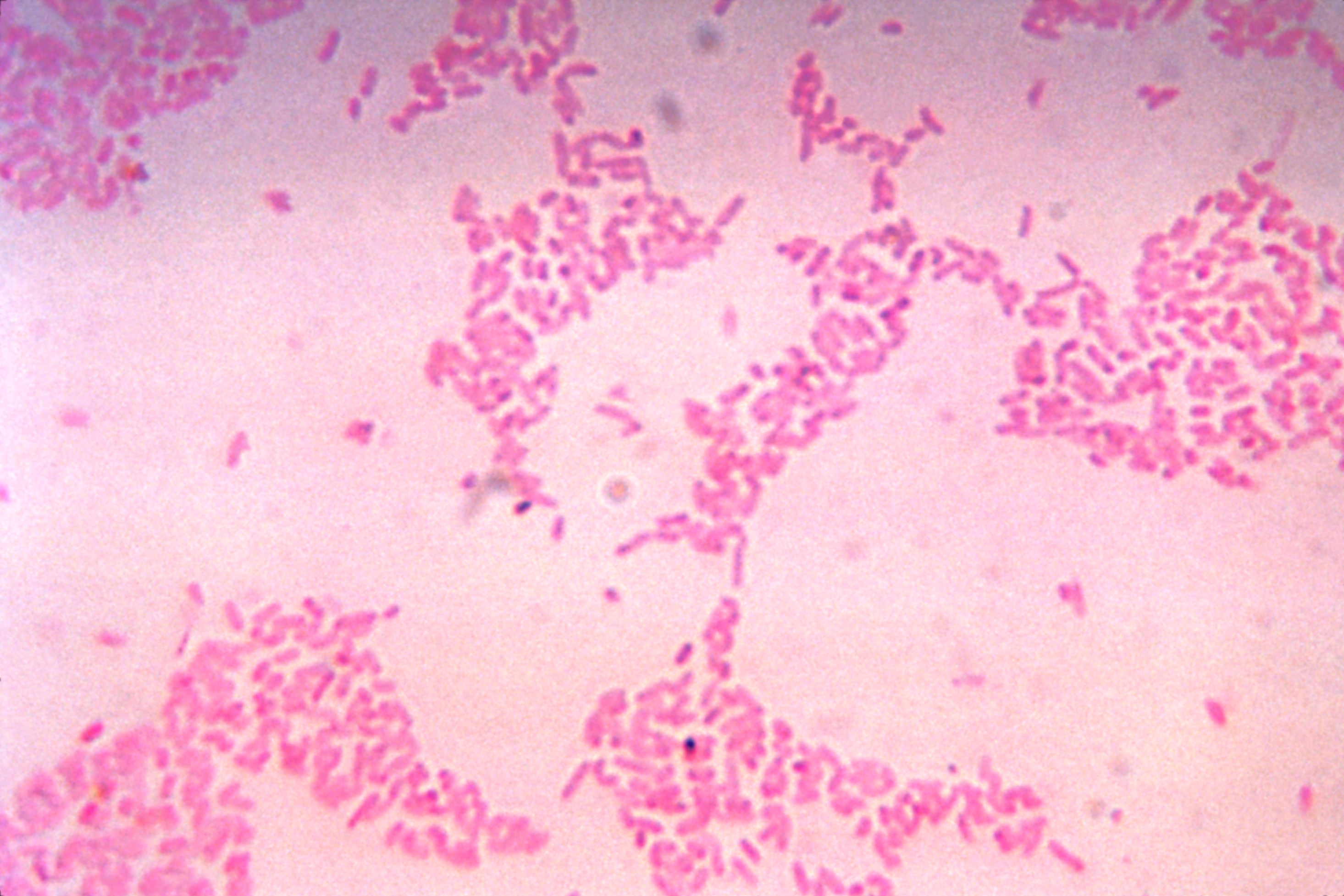

Scientific classification
- Domain: Bacteria
- Kingdom: Pseudomonadati
- Phylum: Bacteroidota
- Class: Bacteroidia
- Order: Bacteroidales
- Family: Bacteroidaceae
- Genus: Bacteroides
- Species: B. thetaiotaomicron

Binomial name
- Bacteroides thetaiotaomicron (Distaso 1912) Castellani and Chalmers 1919

= Bacteroides thetaiotaomicron =

Species of bacterium

Bacteroides thetaiotaomicron is a Gram-negative, obligate anaerobic bacterium and a prominent member of the human gut microbiota, particularly within the large intestine. B. thetaiotaomicron belongs to the Bacteroides genus – a group that is known for its role in the complex microbial community of the gut microbiota. Its proteome, consisting of 4,779 members, includes a system for obtaining and breaking down dietary polysaccharides that would otherwise be difficult to digest for the human body.

The bacterium encodes for enzymes such as glycoside hydrolases and polysaccharide lyases, allowing it to break down dietary fibers, such as cellulose and hemicellulose, into fermentable substrates. This metabolic activity generates short-chain fatty acids (SCFAs) like acetate and propionate, which are absorbed by the host and provide critical energy sources for colonic cells.

B. thetaiotaomicron is an opportunistic pathogen and may become virulent in immunocompromised individuals. B. thetaiotaomicron has been associated with other commensal bacteria and the induction of regulatory T cells, which are essential for maintaining immune tolerance and preventing excessive inflammatory response in the gut mucosa. Due to its adaptability and interaction with the host immune and metabolic systems, B. thetaiotaomicron serves as a model organism for studying symbiosis, microbial ecology, and gut-host interactions.

== History and taxonomy ==
Bacteroides thetaiotaomicron was first described in 1912 under the name Bacillus thetaiotaomicron and moved to the genus Bacteroides in 1919. The specific name derives from the Greek letters theta, iota, and omicron; the List of Prokaryotic names with Standing in Nomenclature indicates this as "relating to the morphology of vacuolated forms." The name is used as an example of an "arbitrary" species name in the International Code of Nomenclature of Prokaryotes. The Bacteroidota bacterial phylum, distinguished by its unique motility, is present in a wide range of ecosystems, habitats, lifestyles, and physiological conditions. The genus Bacteroides represents the most prominent bacteria in the gut of humans, particularly those in western civilizations. Though it is found in abundance in humans, the exact distribution varies between individuals and can be affected by the host's genome, diet, and other factors.

== Evolution ==
Bacteroides thetaiotaomicron is a common bacterium in the human gut microbiome that has evolved alongside humans to support digestion and general health. Over time, this bacterium developed the ability to break down complex carbohydrates into simple sugars, which helps the host species get more energy from the food it eats. B. thetaiotaomicron has a range of specialized enzymes that allow it to process various plant fibers and other dietary components found in the human gut. Because of these adaptations, it has become an essential part of the gut ecosystem, benefiting both itself and the host by playing a big role in maintaining a balanced microbiome.

The evolution of B. thetaiotaomicron seems to have been shaped by the changing diet and immune systems of its human hosts, which influenced the bacterium's genetic and functional traits. For example, it has genes that help it detect and respond to different nutrients, which makes it more resilient in the face of dietary changes. Bacteroides thetaiotaomicron prefers nutrients during different periods of the host's life, particularly before and after the weaning period of an infant. During the suckling period, the oligosaccharides found in the mother's milk and other carbohydrates from the host are preferred. After the weaning period, it prefers plant-derived polysaccharides, such as those found in diets. It also plays a role in regulating the host's immune system, reducing inflammation and contributing to a stable gut environment. This relationship reflects a complex co-evolution where both the human host and B. thetaiotaomicron benefit, showing how interconnected the gut microbiome and human health have become.

The evolution of cooperation within the gut microbiota, specifically involving Bacteroides thetaiotaomicron, highlights how gut microbes adapt to coexist and even cooperate with each other and their hosts. This cooperation allows B. thetaiotaomicron to access nutrients and survive in the complex, competitive gut environment. Over time, evolutionary pressures have shaped this bacterium's metabolic pathways and communication mechanisms, enabling it to thrive in symbiosis with its host, enhancing both microbial survival and host health through mutualistic interactions.

== Host range ==
Bacteroides thetaiotaomicron has been isolated from humans, cattle, pigs, goats and mice. The Bacteroides thetaiotaomicron strain GA17 is specifically associated with humans.

== Genome ==
The genome of B. thetaiotaomicron was sequenced in 2003. It is one circular chromosome of double stranded DNA. It is 6.26 megabases in length, but has a relatively small number of distinct genes. This is due to genes coding for proteins that are unusually large compared to other prokaryotes. This genomic feature is shared with another member of the genus, Bacteroides fragilis. Extensive 16S rRNA count by the Human Microbiome Project (HMP) found the genome contains genes associated with breaking down polysaccharides including glycoside hydrolases (GHs) and polysaccharide lyases (PLs), along with starch binding proteins.

B. thetaiotaomicron has a starch utilization system (Sus), which allows the bacteria to bind complex polysaccharides to the cell surface and the outer membrane enzymes break them down into simple sugars. The polysaccharides that are digested by B. thetaiotaomicron or through Sus are converted into monosaccharides which can then be absorbed by human cells for metabolism. The utilization of Sus allows this bacterium to regulate complex polysaccharide expression that allows an advantage over other bacteria that are unable to regulate their environment.

These genes along with ECF-type sigma factors allow B. thetaiotaomicron to correlate the availability of nutrients with expression of the particular genes. The genome also contains many genes that encode proteins involved in sensing and responding to the extracellular environment, such as sigma factors and two-component systems. The colocalization of the gene encoding digestive enzymes with extracytoplasmic function sigma factors and signal transduction systems create a mechanism that regulates gene expression based on the availability of nutrients in the environment. The B. thetaiotaomicron genome encodes a large number of small non-coding RNAs, which also play a key role in regulatory processes, though few have been characterized to date. B. thetaiotaomicron has several different types of mobile genetic elements, including a 33 kilobase plasmid, 63 transposases, and four homologs of the conjugative transposon CTnDOT. CTnDOT encodes the resistance to the antibiotics erythromycin and tetracycline, and is horizontally transferred between Bacteroides species as well as other gut microbiota.

== Metabolism ==
Bacteroides thetaiotaomicron is capable of metabolizing a very diverse range of otherwise indigestible polysaccharides, like amylose, amylopectin, and pullulan. Its complement of enzymes used for hydrolysis of glycosidic bonds is among the largest known in prokaryotes, and is even thought to be capable of hydrolyzing nearly all glycosidic bonds in biological polysaccharides. As the major organism of the human gut flora to break down plant polysaccharides, it can use dietary carbohydrates, as well as those sourced from the host, depending on nutrient availability. Complex plant polysaccharides, unlike simple monosaccharides and disaccharides that are digested and absorbed in the small intestines, are left to be used as a food source in the colon. Complex polysaccharides are fermented in the colon to produce short chain fatty acids (SCFAs) like acetate and propionate. These SCFAs serve as energy sources for colonocytes and have anti-inflammatory properties B. thetaiotaomicron also relies on glycolysis, the Embden-Meyerhof-Parnas (EMP) pathway, and fermentation to metabolize sugars.

B. thetaiotaomicron is able to dominate the many other gut bacteria in the human colon by using its superior ability to acquire sufficient nutrients. This is possible due to the combined effects of an increased amount of glycosyl hydrolases that degrade enzymes, membrane binding proteins, and sugar-specific transporters. There are 172 glycosylhydrolases produced by B. thetaiotaomicron which is greater than any other sequenced bacterium, providing to enzymes that contribute products of hydrolysis to the host. All Bacteriodes employ polysaccharide-utilization loci (PULs) whose gene clusters encode systems that target and degrade carbohydrates. A part of these systems are carbohydrate-active enzymes (CAZymes) that can very efficiently degrade complex carbohydrates found in the diet. There have been three different PULs identified that use RG-II, a dietary carbohydrate with the most structural complexity, as a substrate. The RG-II degradome contains 23 enzymes that target sequential glycosidic linkage in the RG-II, leading to its disassembly.

B. thetaiotaomicron is aerotolerant and can survive, but not grow, when exposed to oxygen. Oxygen has limited access in eukaryotic host environments, like the human intestines. Generation of reactive oxygen species (ROS) such as hydrogen peroxide may occur, threatening the flora by attacking iron cofactors, enzymes widely used in metabolism. To drive the oxygen concentration to lower levels, B. thetaiotaomicron expresses a number of proteins that scavenge ROS such as hydrogen peroxide when exposed to air.

== Role in the human microbiome ==
Members of the genus Bacteroides accounts for about a quarter of the microbial population in an adult human's intestine. In a long-term study of Bacteroides species in clinical samples, B. thetaiotaomicron was the second most common species isolated, behind Bacteroides fragilis. It is crucial to humans, as it is able to digest plant materials that enzymes within the gut cannot.

B. thetaiotaomicron is a commensal, a type of symbiosis, meaning it provides the host with key benefits like digestion. B. thetaiotaomicron has far more glycosyl hydrolases, in which 61% are located in the outer membrane or extracellular matrix, suggesting that the digestive capabilities serve the bacteria's host more than anything. The glycosyl hydrolases express 23 specific enzymatic functions that supply the host or even other microbes in the gut flora with the breakdown products of hydrolysis. It also has the ability to regulate epithelial glycan synthesis, a process that involves its ability to sense surrounding nutrient availability, such as in the lumen of the gut. It is able to detect nutrients and deploy host enzymes that build and modify glycans when there are few present in their environment. This regulation mechanism allows for B. thetaiotaomicron to maintain its preferred environmental conditions.

Previous studies show that B. thetaiotaomicron stimulates angiogenesis, which is the formation of new blood vessels, during intestinal development following birth. These studies used germ-free mice in order to control the microbiota and inoculated the mice with a specific bacteria, B. thetaiotaomicron. Angiogenesis further benefits the host by increasing the human's ability to absorb the nutrients that the microbe assists in produce.

B. thetaiotaomicron dominates the intestinal microbiome and also aids in another postnatal development of the gut with the formation of the mucosal barrier in the intestine, which plays a major role in maintaining host-microbiota homeostasis. The mucosal barrier, located between the intestinal epithelium and microbiota, is semipermeable, allowing the uptake of essential nutrients while restricting the passage of pathogenic molecules. Nearly 90% of the bacteria within the gut microbiota, colonizing the gastrointestinal tract (GIT), belongs to the Bacteroidetes or Firmicutes phyla. B. thetaiotaomicron's ability to grow on host-derived polysaccharides in mucus is a major contributor to its persistence in the GIT.

The Bacteroides species has the ability to produce distinct lipopolysaccharides (LPS) that suggests it has the potential to modify innate immunity, as glycolipids are known to communicate with the immune system of mammals, particularly through sensing the surrounding bacteria. These LPS structures exhibit a laddered pattern, indicative of an O antigen; however, B. thetaiotaomicron specifically, produces small lipooligosaccharides (LOS) with the absence of an O antigen. The abundance of these LPS and LOS indicate they could function to allow communication between the host and commensal microbes.

== Role in immune response ==
B. thetaiotaomicron is a prominent member of the human gut microbiota, and its role in the immune response is complex. The interaction between B. thetaiotaomicron and the immune system contributes to the maintenance of gut homeostasis and the development of an immune system. The anti-inflammatory and immunomodulatory characteristics of extracellular vesicles generated by the prevalent human gut bacteria B. thetaiotaomicron are evident, along with the identification of the molecular mechanisms governing their interaction with innate immune cells. B. thetaiotaomicron has been associated with other commensal bacteria and the induction of regulatory T cells which are essential for maintaining immune tolerance and preventing excessive inflammatory response.

The outer membrane vesicles (OMVs) not only aid in protecting B. thetaiotaomicron from degradation, but also play a major role in promoting regulatory dendritic cell responses. OMVs of B. thetaiotaomicron in a healthy gut stimulate colonic dendritic cells (DC) to express IL-10, a type of cytokine. T-cells are stimulated by IL-10 and is expressed via the innate immune system through macrophages and DC. B. thetaiotaomicron OMVs in individuals with ulcerative colitis (UC) and Crohn's disease (CD) are unable to stimulate IL-10 expression, resulting in a loss of regulatory DC. In these diseases, B. thetaiotaomicron OMVs also cause a significantly lower amount of DC to be expressed. These results were also observed in patients with the inactive diseases, signifying that the defects in immune response are intrinsic in inflammatory bowel disease (IBD).

== Pathology ==
B. thetaiotaomicron is also an opportunistic pathogen and can infect tissues exposed to gut flora. While contained in the gut, B. thetaiotaomicron generally maintains a beneficial relationship with its host. However, it can present harmful effects if it is introduced to other areas of the body that are not equipped to effectively interact with this type of bacteria. In the case of a rupture in the gastrointestinal tract, B. thetaiotaomicron as well as other gut bacteria can be released from the intestines. This can lead to diseases like bacteremia, which is the presence of bacteria in the bloodstream. B. thetaiotaomicron can also cause bacterial infection in tissue which elicits an immune response and promotes abscess formation.

Due to its polysaccharide-metabolizing abilities, B. thetaiotaomicron contributes to the food source of other components in the gut microbiome. For example, the bacteria express sialidase enzymes, but they cannot catabolize sialic acid. Consequently, their presence increases the amount of available sialic acid in the gut that can be utilized by other organisms for energy. This specific ability allows for the growth of pathogenic bacteria such as Clostridioides difficile, which uses sialic acid as a carbon source. Similarly, B. thetaiotaomicron has been shown to exacerbate pathogenic E. coli infection due to its ability to enrich the availability of nutrients for pathogens such as E. coli . B. thetaiotaomicron's enzymatic properties enable it to further thrive in the competitive environment of the human intestine.

== Research ==
Due to its ability to break down complex polysaccharides, particularly those found in the dietary fibers that humans cannot digest properly, B. thetaiotaomicron has become a model microbe to understand the microbiota in the human gut. B. thetaiotaomicron plays a notable role in gut health, specially regarding its anti-inflammatory properties, which are important in conditions like inflammatory bowel disease (IBD) and Crohn's disease. Research on colitis, a form of IBD, has shown that B. thetaiotaomicron enhances the mucosal barrier, modulates the immune response of the gut microbiota, and counteracts the dysbiosis typically observed in IBD patients, highlighting the role of B. thetaiotaomicron in preventing chronic inflammation. In a study of inflammatory bowel disease (IBD) in mice, B. thetaiotaomicron was found to alleviate colitis when combined with Faecalibacterium prausnitzii. When combined with Faecalibacterium prausnitzii, B. thetaiotaomicron proved to a qualified bacterium to be used for fecal microbiota transplantation, and overall future therapeutic reports.

Having a fully sequenced genome, B. thetaiotaomicron can undergo genetic manipulation. The genome is altered to understand the host-bacteria interaction, and interactions with other microbes. It was found that B. thetaiotaomicron could be engineered to maintain long-term storage of responses to environmental conditions. This could lead to the ability to monitor effects of surface polysaccharides, colonization, and overall gut health of the host. Research has also indicated that when exposed to bile, B. thetaiotaomicron develops physiological adaptations, allowing it to increase its colonization capacity. These bile induced adaptations include enhanced stress tolerance mechanisms and increased production of efflux pumps which ultimately provide cross-protection against harmful agents such as antibiotics. However, the bile concentration required to enable these adaptions can only be accessed in certain parts of the gut.

Bacteroides thetaiotaomicron has been evaluated as an indicator of fecal pollution. Fecal matter from different host species results in various health risks. For example, enteric viruses from humans account for most gastrointestinal illnesses while infectious parasites tend to be transferred from livestock. Identifying the origin of fecal matter is the first step in understanding the risk of contact, as well as how to eliminate the threat of contamination. It was found that the specific B. thetaiotaomicron marker, particularly the human-associated Bacteroides thetaiotaomicron strain GA17, was an accurate indicator of fecal contamination. The presence of B. thetaiotaomicron is greater in humans than nonhumans, making this a good indicator of the presence of human feces. The accuracy of the test combined with faster analysis times of identifying B. thetaiotaomicron in samples makes these bacteria – or the bacteriophages that infect them – a qualifying contender for future fecal pollution identification.
