= Bacteroides stercoris =

Scientific classification
- Domain: Bacteria
- Kingdom: Pseudomonadati
- Phylum: Bacteroidota
- Class: Bacteroidia
- Order: Bacteroidales
- Family: Bacteroidaceae
- Genus: Bacteroides
- Species: B. stercoris

Binomial name
- Bacteroides stercoris Johnson et al., 1986 in GBIF Secretariat (2023). GBIF Backbone Taxonomy

Anaerobic

Bacteroides stercoris is an anaerobic, Gram-negative, non-spore-forming rod-shaped bacterium. It is a typical component of the human microbiome, commonly found in the colon. It typically forms a beneficial relationship with the host when retained in the gut. Escape from this environment can cause significant pathology in many body sites. It is a member of the Bacteroides fragilis group, a group of closely related and most commonly isolated Bacteroidacaea in anaerobic infections. The group is named after Bacteroides fragilis, the most prevalent organism in the group.

== Pathogenicity ==
Bacteroides species are often isolated as anaerobic pathogens. These infections occur when the bacteria escape their normal habitat and colonise a normally sterile body area. For example, when the intestinal wall is disrupted by a surgical wound or direct trauma members of the normal gut flora can infiltrate the normally sterile peritoneal cavity. Anaerobic infections are usually polymicrobial with B. stercoris making up a small proportion of the infecting species. B. stercoris has been isolated from infections of the abdomen, appendix, leg and bone. Appropriate use of antimicrobial therapies can greatly improve infection prognosis.

Potent virulence factors enable B. stercoris to infect individuals. Bacteroides protective capsule can prevent them being destroyed by phagocytes. Decreased production of nitric oxide in macrophages due to infection with Bacteroides can allow the bacteria to evade killing by the macrophages. Additionally, Bacteroides ability to modulate their surface polysaccharide can aid their ability to evade the host immune response.

== Antibiotic resistance ==
Infections with Bacteroides species including B. stercoris are frequently treated with antibiotics including β-lactams, carbapenems and clindamycin. Resistance of Bacteroides to a given antibiotic varies between geographical location and institution as well as species Bacteroides species are showing increasing levels of antibiotic resistance including multi-drug resistance.

=== Bacteroides as a reservoir for resistance ===
Bacteroides living commensally in the gut have the potential to act as a reservoir of antibiotic resistance genes. Passing these genes on to more virulent bacteria that move through the gut periodically. These more virulent bacteria can include those causing gastrointestinal infections as well as respiratory infections as the bacteria can be inhaled and swallowed, allowing them to pass through the gut. Resistance genes are transferred using mechanisms such as horizonal gene transfer.

== Potential anti-obesity activity ==
The gut microbiota play a role in obesity, a higher ration of Firmicutes to Bacteroidetes has been reported as a biomarker of obesity. This suggests that Bacteroidetes play a role in inhibiting obesity. An in vivo study in mice found that oral administration of B. stercoris reduced body weight and fat weight in obese mice. As well as restoring glucose sensitivity. These results suggest that B. stercoris could be used to treat obesity
