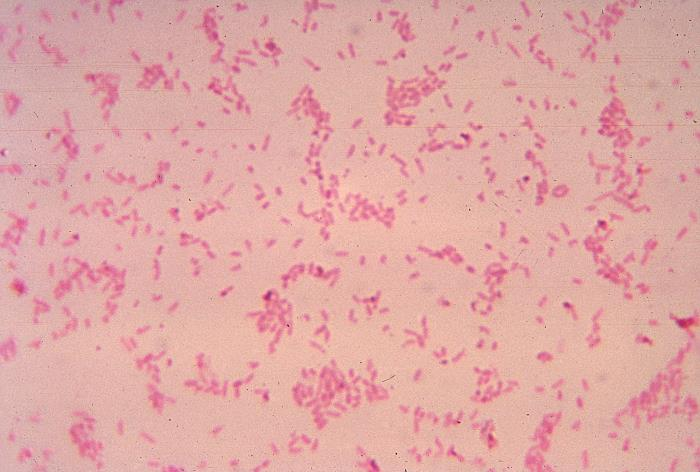
- Photomicrograph of B. ovatus bacteria, cultured in a blood agar medium, and incubated for a 48 hour time period

Scientific classification
- Domain: Bacteria
- Kingdom: Pseudomonadati
- Phylum: Bacteroidota
- Class: Bacteroidia
- Order: Bacteroidales
- Family: Bacteroidaceae
- Genus: Bacteroides
- Species: B. ovatus

Binomial name
- Bacteroides ovatus Eggerth & Gagnon, 1933

= Bacteroides ovatus =

Species of bacteria

Bacteroides ovatus is a species of anaerobic, Gram-negative, non-spore-forming, rod-shaped bacteria. It is a typical component of the human microbiome, commonly found in the colon. It typically forms a beneficial relationship with the host when retained in the gut. Escape from this environment can cause significant pathology in many body sites. It is a member of the Bacteroides fragilis group, a group of the most commonly isolated Bacteroidacaea in anaerobic infections. The group is named after Bacteroides fragilis, the most prevalent organism in the group.

== Habitat ==
As a member of the Bacteroides genus, B. ovatus resides is the gastrointestinal tract of warm-blooded animals. B. ovatus is considered a human adapted species due to its higher abundance in human samples compared to other mammal and avian species. Optimal growth conditions for the bacterium resemble those found in the intestine, a temperature of 37°C and pH of 7.

== Metabolism and mutualism in the gut microbiome ==
The gut microbiome contributes significantly to human health. Commensal gut microbes are known to provide key nutrients, prevent pathogen colonisation and modulate the immune system. The relationship between B. ovatus and its human host is considered mutualistic as both organisms benefit. The bacteria are provided with an appropriate environment to grow and survive, and endow humans with many features we have not evolved ourselves. Fermentation of carbohydrates by Bacteroides species produces volatile fatty acids that are reabsorbed through the large intestine and used as an energy source by the host.

== Pathogenicity ==
Bacteroides species are often isolated as anaerobic pathogens. These infections occur when the bacteria escape their normal habitat and colonise a normally sterile body area. For example, when the intestinal wall is disrupted by a surgical wound or direct trauma members of the normal gut flora can infiltrate the normally sterile peritoneal cavity. Anaerobic infections are usually polymicrobial with B. ovatus being just one of the infecting species. Appropriate use of antimicrobial therapies can greatly improve infection prognosis.

Potent virulence factors enable B. ovatus to infect individuals. Bacteroides protective capsule can prevent them being destroyed by phagocytes. Decreased production of nitric oxide in macrophages due to infection with Bacteroides can allow the bacteria to evade killing by the macrophages. Additionally, Bacteroides ability to modulate their surface polysaccharide can aid their ability to evade the host immune response.

== Antibiotic resistance ==
Infections with Bacteroides species including B. ovatus are frequently treated with antibiotics including β-lactams, carbapenems and clindamycin. Resistance of Bacteroides to a given antibiotic varies between geographical location and institution as well as species. Bacteroides species are showing increasing levels of antibiotic resistance including multi-drug resistance.

=== Bacteroides as a reservoir for resistance ===
Bacteroides living commensally in the gut have the potential to act as a reservoir of antibiotic resistance genes. Passing these genes on to more virulent bacteria that move through the gut periodically. These more virulent bacteria can include those causing gastrointestinal infections as well as respiratory infections as the bacteria can be inhaled and swallowed, allowing them to pass through the gut. Resistance genes are transferred using mechanisms such as horizonal gene transfer.

== Probiotic potential ==
The Bacteroides genus is widely considered a source of next generation probiotics. Probiotics are used to maintain or restore the balance of human intestinal microbiota. They can relieve the symptoms of diseases caused in part by disruption of the intestinal microbiota. Probiotics have the potential to improve intestinal disorders as well as cardiovascular disease, behaviour disorders and cancer by modifying host immune cells, regulating metabolites and outcompeting detrimental bacteria. Due to the potential for Bacteroides species to cause infection when they escape from the gut, extensive safety evaluation is necessary before Bacteroides probiotics can reach final application.
