= Acetothermus =

Scientific classification
- Domain: Bacteria
- Kingdom: Pseudomonadati
- Phylum: Bacteroidota
- Class: Bacteroidia
- Order: Bacteroidales
- Family: Bacteroidaceae
- Genus: Acetothermus; Dietrich et al. 1988

Type species
- A. paucivorans

Genus of bacteria

Acetothermus is a genus in the phylum Bacteroidota (Bacteria).

== Etymology ==
The name Acetothermus derives from:
Latin noun acetum, vinegar; Greek adjective thermos (θερμός), hot; Neo-Latin masculine gender noun Acetothermus, a thermophilic microorganism producing acetic acid.

== Species ==
The genus contains single species, namely A. paucivorans ( Dietrich et al. 1988, (Type species of the genus).; Latin adjective paucus, few, little; Latin participle adjective vorans, eating, devouring; N.L participle adjective paucivorans, eating little (utilizing only a very restricted number of the supplied substrates).)

== See also ==
- Bacterial taxonomy
- Microbiology
