= Bacteroides uniformis =

Scientific classification
- Domain: Bacteria
- Kingdom: Pseudomonadati
- Phylum: Bacteroidota
- Class: Bacteroidia
- Order: Bacteroidales
- Family: Bacteroidaceae
- Genus: Bacteroides
- Species: B. uniformis

Binomial name
- Bacteroides uniformis Eggerth & Gagnon, 1933

Species of bacterium

Bacteroides uniformis is a Gram-negative, obligate anaerobic bacterium commonly isolated from human feces. Species of the genus Bacteroides contribute to gut stability by breaking down complex polysaccharides into short-chain fatty acids (SCFAs), which are essential for gut health, immune modulation, and energy metabolism.

== Structure ==
Bacteroides uniformis is rod-shaped and possesses an outer membrane that contains lipopolysaccharides. Unlike many other Gram-negative bacteria, the LPS of B. uniformis has relatively low endotoxic potential, contributing to reduced inflammatory responses. Its genome includes numerous carbohydrate-active enzymes that enable it to degrade polysaccharides, host-derived glycans, and mucins. This metabolic versatility allows B. uniformis to efficiently access nutrients in the gut environment.

== Functions ==
Studies involving oral administration of B. uniformis to mice fed a high-fat diet have shown an 18% reduction in serum cholesterol levels and decreased cholesterol accumulation in the liver. However, other species in the genus, such as B. fragilis, have been implicated in abscess formation in mice, indicating that not all members of this genus are entirely safe for therapeutic use.

B. uniformis reduces allergen uptake and restores fecal immunoglobulin A (IgA) levels when colonizing the gut. Additionally, it has a positive association with insoluble dietary fiber. In experimental mouse models, colonization with B. uniformis helped reduce weight gain and mitigated pathology associated with metabolic disease.

The probiotic properties of B. uniformis to help treat Irritable Bowel Syndrome (IBS) and colitis was investigated in a 2025 mouse study. This study found that B. uniformis could alleviate colitis progression and was involved in bile acid metabolism, which, in turn, may help to limit intestinal immune response for intestinal barrier dysfunction health conditions, such as IBSl

B. uniformis also increases the abundance of Bifidobacterium and Lactobacillus vaginallis in mice,
