= Bacteroides dorei =

Scientific classification
- Domain: Bacteria
- Kingdom: Pseudomonadati
- Phylum: Bacteroidota
- Class: Bacteroidia
- Order: Bacteroidales
- Family: Bacteroidaceae
- Genus: Bacteroides
- Species: B. dorei

Binomial name
- Bacteroides dorei Bakir et al. 2006

Species of bacterium

Bacteroides dorei is a species of bacteria within the genus Bacteroides, first isolated in 2006. It is found in the intestinal systems of humans and animals. Research is being conducted to better understand the relationship Bacteroides dorei has on the human intestinal system and the autoimmune disease, Type 1 Diabetes (T1D).

== Biology and ecology ==
Bacteroides dorei is a gram negative, rod-shaped bacteria that contributes to normal intestinal functionality. It was isolated and differentiated from Bacteroides vulgatus by using 16S rRNA sequencing and phenotypic tests. B. dorei is a non-spore-forming, non-motile, and anaerobic bacterium with a DNA G+C content of 43%. Growth occurs optimally at 37 °C with individual cell size between 1.6-4.2 μm by 0.8-1.2 μm. In addition, colonies streaked on Eggerth Gagnon (EG) agar with 5% horse blood plate and incubated over 48 hours in 100% CO_{2} gas at 37 °C, resulted in colony size of 2.0 mm and individual colony morphology of circular, white, raised, and convexed.

== Taxonomy ==
Bacteroides

- - 79
    - 94
      - 76
        - 51
          - - - - 97
                  - 94
                    - 100
                      - 100
                        - B. dorei 175^{T} (=JCM 13471^{T}) (AB242142)
                        - B. dorei 219 (=JCM 13472) (AB242143)
                      - B. vulgatus ATCC 8482^{T} (M58762)
                    - B. massiliensis CCUG 48901^{T} (AY126616)
                  - 99
                    - B. coprocola JCM 12979^{T} (AB200224)
                    - B. plebeius JCM 12973^{T} (AB200217)
                - B. helcogenes JCM 6297^{T} (AB200227)
              - 57
                - B.eggerthii NCTC 11155^{T} (L16485)
                - B. stercoris ATCC 43183^{T} (X83953)
                - B. uniformis ATCC 8492^{T} (L16486)
            - B. intestinalis JCM 13265^{T} (AB214328)
          - 89
            - 78
              - B. nordii ATCC BAA-998^{T} (AY608697)
              - B. salyersiae ATCC BAA-997^{T} (AY608696)
            - - B. fragilis ATCC 25285^{T} (M11656)
              - - - B.thetaiotaomicron ATCC 29148^{T} (L16489)
                  - B.finegoldii JCM 13345^{T} (AB222699)
                - - B.ovatus NCTC 11153^{T} (L16484)
                  - 92
                    - B. acidifaciens JCM 10556^{T} (AB021164)
                    - B. caccae ATCC 43185^{T} (XB3951)
        - 100
          - B. tectus JCM 10003^{T} (AB200228)
          - 99
            - B. pyogenes JCM 6294^{T} (AB200229)
            - B. denticanum B78 (AF319778)
      - B. coprosuis CCUG 50528^{T} (AF319778)
    - 100
      - B. merdae ATCC 43184^{T} (X83954)
      - B. distasonis ATCC 8503^{T} (M86695)
  - 100
    - B. capillosus ATCC 29799^{T} (AY136666)
    - B. cellulosolvens ATCC 35603^{T} (L35517)
- Provotella melaninogenica ATCC 25845^{T} (AY323525)

Neighbour-joining tree showing phylogenetic positions of isolates 175T and 219 among recognized members of the genus Bacteroides based on 16S rRNA gene sequences available in the DDBJ/EMBL/GenBank databases. Scale bar represents 0.02 substitutions per nucleotide position. Bootstrap values (>50%) based on 1000 replications are listed as percentages at the branching points.

== Metabolism ==
Bacteroides dorei has been tested for numerous different metabolic test looking at different sugars. Growth of cells was seen via production of acid occurred on the following sugars: glucose, sucrose, xylose, rhamnose, lactose, maltose, arabinose, mannose and raffinose while no growth and no acid production occurred on the following sugars: cellobiose, salicin, trehalose, mannitol, glycerol, melezitose and sorbitol.

== Medical significance ==
Previous research has shown that individuals who are genetically predisposed to various autoimmune diseases have significant differences in bacteria composition than non-genetically predisposed individuals. This difference in bacteria composition in the gut system is increasingly believed to be highly important in understanding autoimmune diseases such as Type1 Diabetes. In 2014, researchers looked at the early development of bacterial composition in high genetic risk children looking at early onset of Type 1 Diabetes. They took stool samples of 76 children looking at the early development of microbial communities from 4–6 months of age until 2.2 year old. Out of the 76 infants, 29 seroconverted to T1D autoimmune related cases, of which of 22 later on developed T1D (cases). The other 47 infants didn't seroconvert or develop T1D (control). Metagenomic sequencing results showed significantly higher composition of B. dorei and Bacteroides vulgatus in the cases versus the control group prior to seroconversion. In addition, data showed that B. dorei peaked at 7.6 months, almost 8 months prior to first inslet autoantibody in cases. This significant compositional change suggests that the increase in amount of B. dorei is a potential indicator of the development of T1D.

Additional research looked at epigenetics of B. dorei and were able to demonstrate that 1 individual had B. dorei with GATC (gene) methylation while another individual had B. dorei lacking GATC methylation. Scientist took stool samples of two babies and sequenced the genomes of B. dorei in samples 105 and 439. Sample B. dorei 105 had 49,007 total methylation in the genome with 14,322 methylation sites and in sample B. dorei 439, there was 38,203 total methylations with 24,770 methylation sites. The key result is that sample 105 includes a key gene called DamMT (DNA methyltransferase) while sample 439 lacked this gene. In addition, out of 20,554 GATC sites in sample B. dorei 105, there was only had 3 sites that weren't methylated whereas sample B. dorei 439 had 18,908 GATC sites and none of the GATC sites were methylated. Dam methylation and methylation of GATC could be significant factors for microbial colonization and functionality in the gut system and affects numerous gene expressions of transport processes such as nutrient transportation, antibiotic effluxes actions to antibiotic resistance, and movement of energy. The results suggests that Dam and GATC methylation of B. dorei 105 could have highly significant varied gene expression from B. dorei 439 that lacks GATC methylation and could affect functionality of B. dorei in the gut microbiome. Previous research has shown that Dam methylation mutants have increased susceptibility to higher antibiotic concentrations and lower minimum. This suggests that Dam methylation process plays a significant role in up-regulation of antibiotic effluxes, resulting in increased antibiotic resistance. Also, GATC methylation demonstrates important microbial functions such as DNA repair, replication, and LPS composition. Methylation of GATC motif by DamMT in pathogenic bacteria, for example, Vibrio cholerae, Yersinia pestis, and Yersinia pseudotuberculosis has been shown to increase virulence and expression of genes towards multiple operations such as, mismatch repair and DNA replication enables pathogenic bacteria to combat against antibiotics. These results show why future research to create antibiotics that prevent the creation of DamMT in pathogenetic bacteria is needed.
