= Nicholas Ingolia =

American molecular biologist

- Born: Nicholas Thomas Ingolia; February 5, 1979 (age 46); San Francisco, California

Nicholas Thomas Ingolia (born February 5, 1979) is an American molecular biologist and professor at University of California, Berkeley. He is most known for the development of the method of ribosome profiling. He has also studied the evolution of heat-sensing nerves in vampire bats and the encoding of small peptides by short open reading frames (sORFs). Ingolia is a 2011 Searle Scholar and serves on a peer-review committee for the American Cancer Society.
