= Acetofilamentum =

Scientific classification
- Domain: Bacteria
- Kingdom: Pseudomonadati
- Phylum: Bacteroidota
- Class: Bacteroidia
- Order: Bacteroidales
- Family: Bacteroidaceae
- Genus: Acetofilamentum; Dietrich et al. 1989

Type species
- A. rigidum

Genus of bacteria

Acetofilamentum is a genus in the phylum Bacteroidota (Bacteria).

== Etymology ==
The name Acetofilamentum derives from:
Latin noun acetum, vinegar; Latin neuter gender noun filamentum, a spun thread; Neo-Latin neuter gender noun Acetofilamentum, an acetate-producing, filamentous, threadlike bacterium.

== Species ==
The genus contains single species, namely A. rigidum ( Dietrich et al. 1989, (Type species of the genus).; Latin neuter gender adjective rigidum, stiff, rigid.)

== See also ==
- Bacterial taxonomy
- Microbiology
