= Ribosome-nascent chain complex =

Molecules constituting a ribosome

Visualisation of an RNC showing the ribosome as a translucent cartoon and the nascent chain as a pink ribbon

Ribosome-nascent chain complex (RNC) refers to the collection of molecules that constitute a ribosome attached to the polypeptide (protein) that it is synthesising. The synthesis of the nascent polypeptide may be stalled by one of several methods. RNCs are produced and purified in laboratories to study the dynamics, biochemistry, folding and interactions of both the ribosome and proteins undergoing synthesis.
