= Phocaeicola =

Scientific classification
- Domain: Bacteria
- Kingdom: Pseudomonadati
- Phylum: Bacteroidota
- Class: Bacteroidia
- Order: Bacteroidales
- Family: Bacteroidaceae
- Genus: Phocaeicola; Al Masalma et al., 2009

Genus of bacteria

Phocaeicola is a genus of gram-negative, non-spore-forming, coccoid to rod-shaped cells with no flagella in the phylum Bacteroidota. The first known species of Phocaeicola, P. abscessus, was isolated from a brain abscess in Foça Turkey. It was named after the Ionian Greek city, Phocaea, now modern day Foça.

Recently 14 Bacteroides species (B. vulgatus, B. barnesiae, B. caecicola, B. caecigallinarum, B. chincillae, B. coprocola, B. coprophilus, B. dorei, B. gallinaceum, B. massiliensis, B. paurosaccharolyticus, B. plebeius, B. salanitronis, B. sartorii) have been reclassified as Phocaeicola due to phylogenetic differences.
