= Polysome =

Ribosomes bound to an mRNA molecule

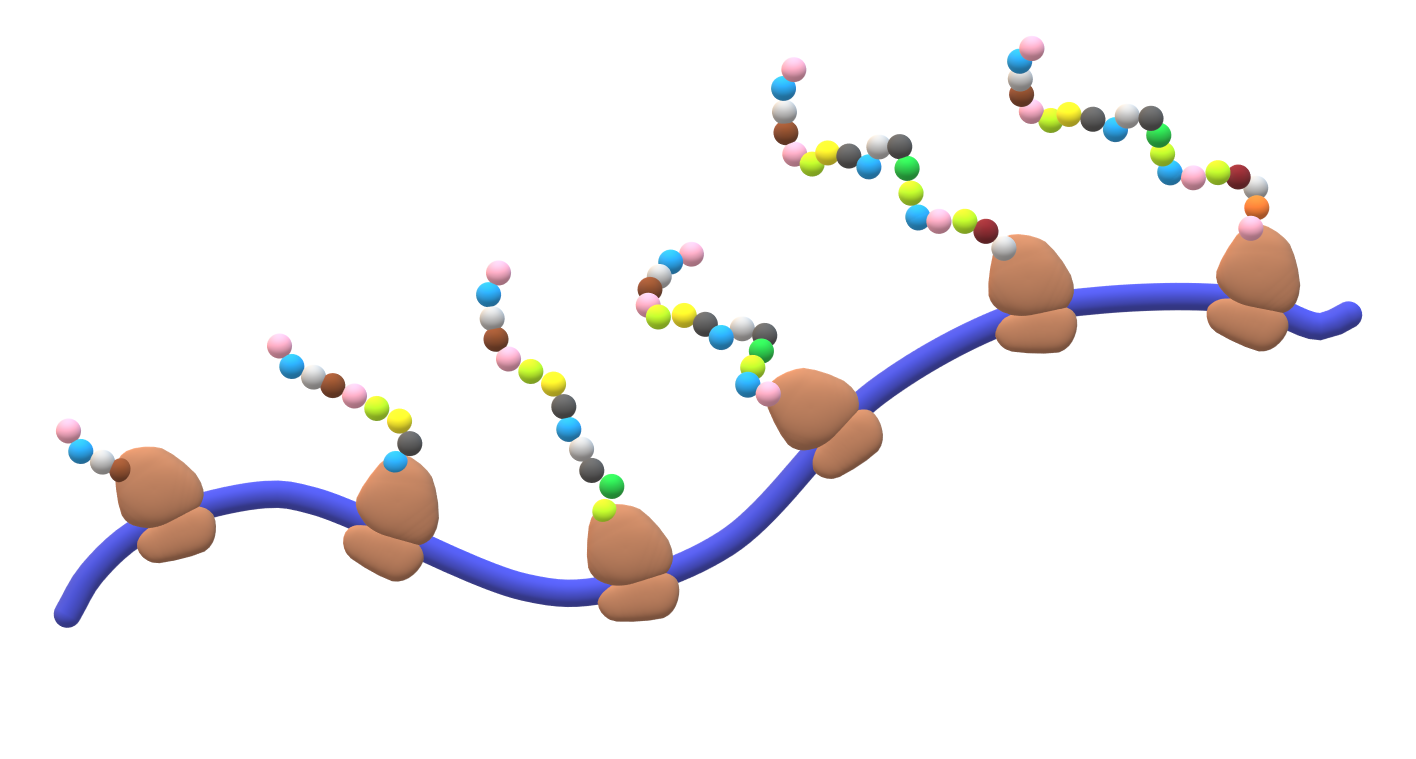
Several ribosomes synthesizing a polypeptide on the same mRNA strand

A polysome, also called a polyribosome or ergosome, is a group of ribosomes bound to the same messenger RNA molecule, resembling "beads" on a "thread". It consists of a complex of a single mRNA molecule and two or more ribosomes that work simultaneously to translate the mRNA transcript into polypeptides. Polysomes were originally described in 1962 by Jonathan Warner, Alexander Rich, and Cecil Hall. The term "ergosome" was also used around 1963 by Paul M. Knopf and Alex Rich.

Polysomes are formed during the elongation phase when multiple ribosomes and elongation factors synthesize encoded polypeptides. Multiple ribosomes move along the coding region of the messenger RNA, creating a polysome. The ability of multiple ribosomes to simultaneously synthesize multiple polypeptide chains from a single mRNA molecule explains the limited abundance of mRNA in the cell. Polyribosome structure differs between prokaryotic polysomes, eukaryotic polysomes, and membrane-bound polysomes. Through a technique called polysomal profiling, polysome activity can be used as a metric for measuring gene expression.

== Structure ==
Electron microscopy technologies such as staining, metal shadowing, and ultra-thin cell sections were the original methods used to determine polysome structure. The development of cryo-electron microscopy techniques has allowed for increased resolution of the image, leading to more precise methods of determining structure. Different structural configurations of polyribosomes could reflect a variety in translation of mRNAs. An investigation of the ratio of polyribosomal shape elucidated that a high number of circular and zigzag polysomes were found after several rounds of translation. A longer period of translation caused the formation of densely packed, three-dimensional helical polysomes. Different cells produce different structures of polysomes.

=== Prokaryotic ===
Bacterial polysomes have been found to form double-row structures. In this conformation, the ribosomes are contacting each other through smaller subunits. These double row structures generally have a sinusoidal (zigzag) or three-dimensional helical path. In the sinusoidal path, there are two types of contact between the small subunits: "top-to-top" and "top-to-bottom". In the helical path, only "top-to-top" contact is observed.

Polysomes are present in archaea, but not much is known about their structure.

=== Eukaryotic ===
Studies have shown that eukaryotic polysomes exhibit linear configurations. Densely packed 3D helices and planar double-row polysomes were found with variable packing including "top-to-top" contacts similar to prokaryotic polysomes. Eukaryotic 3D polyribosomes are similar to prokaryotic 3D polyribosomes in that they are "densely packed left-handed helices with four ribosomes per turn". This dense packing can determine their function as regulators of translation, with 3D polyribosomes being found in sarcoma cells using fluorescence microscopy.

==== In vitro ====
Atomic force microscopy used in in vitro studies have shown that circular eukaryotic polysomes can be formed by free polyadenylated mRNA in the presence of initiation factor eIF4E bound to the 5' cap and PABP bound to the 3' poly(A) tail. However, this interaction between cap and poly(A) tail mediated by a protein complex is not a unique way of circularizing polysomal mRNA. It has been found that topologically circular polyribosomes can be successfully formed in the translational system with mRNA with no cap and no poly(A) tail as well as a capped mRNA without a 3' poly(A) tail.

=== Membrane-bound ===
Polyribosomes bound to membranes are restricted by a two-dimensional space given by the membrane surface. The restriction of inter-ribosomal contacts causes a round-shape configuration that arranges ribosomes along the mRNA so that the entry and exit sites form a smooth pathway. Each ribosome is turned relative to the previous one, resembling a planar spiral.

== Profiling ==
Polysomal profiling is a technique that uses cycloheximide to arrest translation and a sucrose gradient to separate the resulting cell extract by centrifugation. Ribosome-associated mRNAs migrate faster than free mRNAs and polysome-associated mRNAs migrate faster than ribosome-associated mRNAs. Several peaks corresponding to mRNA are revealed by the measurement of total protein across the gradient. The corresponding mRNA is associated with increasing numbers of ribosomes as polysomes. The presence of mRNA across the gradient reveals the translation of the mRNA. Polysomal profiling is optimally applied to cultured cells and tissues to track the translational status of an identified mRNA as well as measure ribosome density. This technique has been used to compare the translational status of mRNAs in different cell types.

For example, polysomal profiling was used in a study to investigate the effect of vesicular stomatitis virus (VSV) in mammalian cells. The data from polysomal profiling showed that host mRNAs are outcompeted by viral mRNAs for polysomes, therefore decreasing the translation of host mRNA and increasing the translation of viral mRNA.
