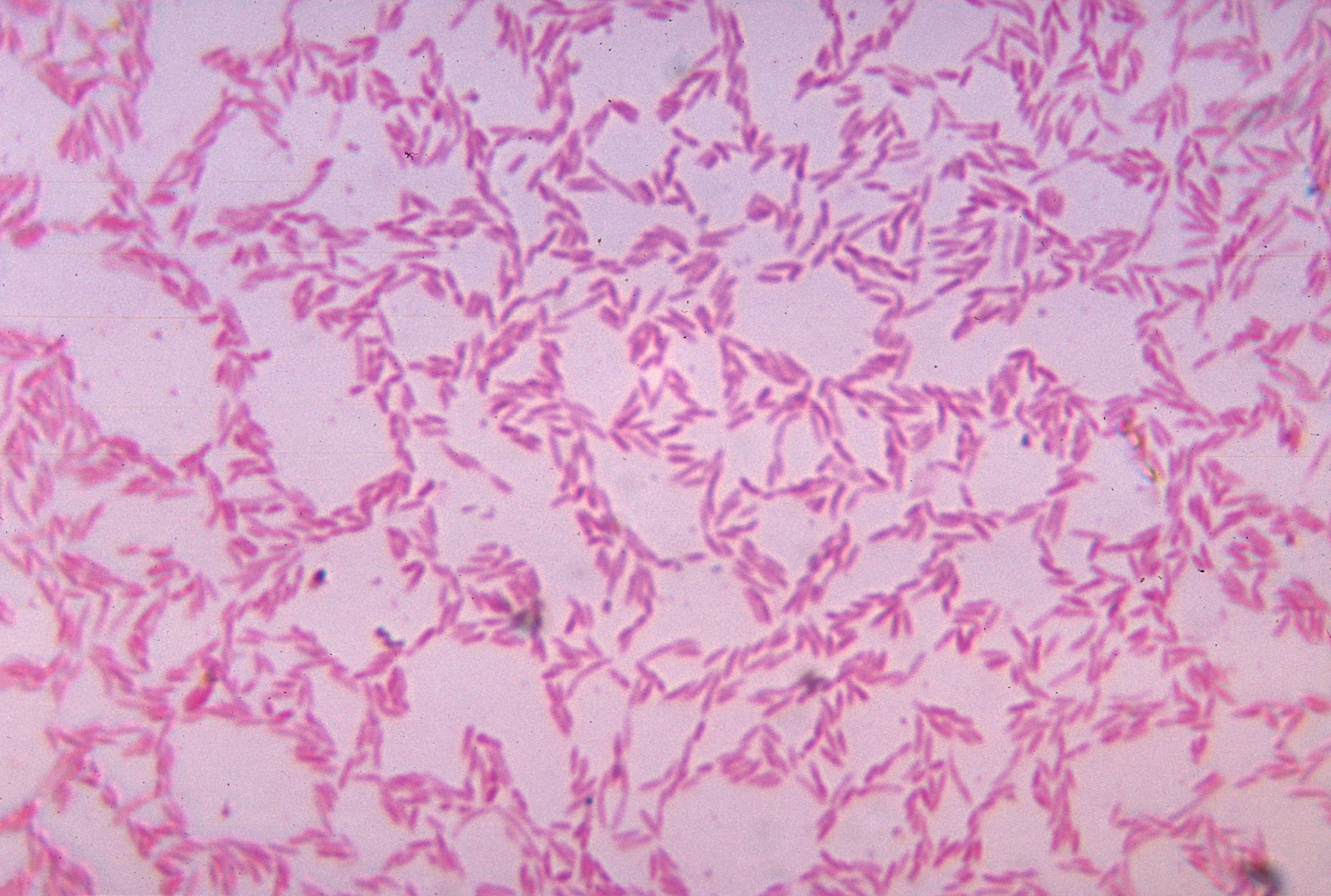
- Bacteroides biacutis anaerobically cultured in blood agar medium

Scientific classification
- Domain: Bacteria
- Kingdom: Pseudomonadati
- Phylum: Bacteroidota
- Class: Bacteroidia
- Order: Bacteroidales
- Family: Bacteroidaceae
- Genus: Bacteroides; Castellani & Chalmers 1919

Species
- B. acidifaciens; B. barnesiaes; B. caccae; B. caecicola; B. caecigallinarum; B. cellulosilyticus; B. cellulosolvens; B. clarus; B. coagulans; B. coprocola; B. coprophilus; B. coprosuis; B. dorei; B. eggerthii; B. gracilis; B. faecichinchillae; B. faecis; B. finegoldii; B. fluxus; B. fragilis; B. galacturonicus; B. gallinaceum; B. gallinarum; B. goldsteinii; B. graminisolvens; B. helcogene; B. intestinalis; B. luti; B. massiliensis; B. mediterraneensis; B. nordii; B. oleiciplenus; B. oris; B. ovatus; B. paurosaccharolyticus; B. plebeius; B. polypragmatus; B. propionicifaciens; B. putredinis; B. pyogenes; B. reticulotermitis; B. rodentium; B. salanitronis; B. salyersiae; B. sartorii; B. sedimenti; B. stercoris; B. suis; B. tectus; B. thetaiotaomicron; B. uniformis; B. vulgatus; B. xylanisolvens

= Bacteroides =

Genus of bacteria

Bacteroides is a genus of Gram-negative, obligate anaerobic bacteria. Bacteroides species are non endospore–forming bacilli, and may be either motile or nonmotile, depending on the species. The DNA base composition is 40–48% GC. Unusual in bacterial organisms, Bacteroides membranes contain sphingolipids. They also contain meso-diaminopimelic acid in their peptidoglycan layer.

Bacteroides species are normally mutualistic, making up the most substantial portion of the mammalian gastrointestinal microbiota, where they play a fundamental role in processing of complex molecules to simpler ones in the host intestine. As many as 10^{10}–10^{11} cells per gram of human feces have been reported. They can use simple sugars when available; however, the main sources of energy for Bacteroides species in the gut are complex host-derived and plant glycans. Studies indicate that long-term diet is strongly associated with the gut microbiome composition—those who eat a higher proportion of protein and animal fats have predominantly Bacteroides bacteria, while for those who consume more carbohydrates or fiber the Prevotella species dominate.

One of the most important clinically is Bacteroides fragilis.

The former Bacteroides melaninogenicus was reclassified and split into Prevotella melaninogenica and Prevotella intermedia.

== Pathogenesis ==
Bacteroides species also benefit their host by excluding potential pathogens from colonizing the gut. Some species (B. fragilis, for example) are opportunistic human pathogens, causing infections of the peritoneal cavity, gastrointestinal surgery, and appendicitis via abscess formation, inhibiting phagocytosis, and inactivating beta-lactam antibiotics. Although Bacteroides species are anaerobic, they are transiently aerotolerant and thus can survive in the abdominal cavity.

In general, Bacteroides are resistant to a wide variety of antibiotics—β-lactams, aminoglycosides, and recently many species have acquired resistance to erythromycin and tetracycline. This high level of antibiotic resistance has prompted concerns that Bacteroides species may become a reservoir for resistance in other, more highly pathogenic bacterial strains. It has been often considered susceptible to clindamycin, but recent evidence demonstrated an increasing trend in clindamycin resistance rates (up to 33%).

=== Bacteroides infections ===
In cases where Bacteroides can move outside the gut due to gastrointestinal tract rupture or intestinal surgery, Bacteroides can infect several parts of the human body. Bacteroides can enter the central nervous system by penetrating the blood brain barrier through the olfactory and trigeminal cranial nerves and can cause meningitis and brain abscesses. Bacteroides has also been isolated from abscesses in the neck and lungs. Some Bacteroides species are associated with Crohn's disease, appendicitis and inflammatory bowel disease. Bacteroides species play multiple roles within the human gut microbiome.

== Microbiological applications ==
An alternative fecal indicator organism, Bacteroides, has been suggested because they make up a significant portion of the fecal bacterial population, have a high degree of host specificity that reflects differences in the digestive system of the host animal Over the past decade, real-time polymerase chain reaction (PCR) methods have been used to detect the presence of various microbial pathogens through the amplification of specific DNA sequences without culturing bacteria. One study has measured the amount of Bacteroides by using qPCR to quantify the host-specific 16S rRNA genetic marker. This technique allows quantification of genetic markers that are specific to the host of the bacteria Bacteroides and allow detection of recent contamination. A recent report found temperature plays a major role in the amount of time the bacteria will persist in the environment, the life span increases with colder temperatures (0–4 °C).

"A new study has found that there is a three-way relationship between a type of gut bacteria, cortisol, and brain metabolites. This relationship, the researchers hypothesize, may potentially lead to further insight into autism, but more in-depth studies are needed."

Another study showed a 5.6-times higher risk of osteoporosis fractures in the low Bacteroides group of Japanese postmenopausal women.

== Human ==
Members of the Bacillota and Bacteroidota phyla make up a majority of the bacterial species in the human intestinal microbiota (the "gut microbiome"). The healthy human gut microbiome consists of 109 abundant species of which 31 (19.7%) are members of the Bacteroidetes while 63 (40%) and 32 (20%) belong to Bacillota and Actinomycetota.

Bacteroides species' main source of energy is fermentation of a wide range of sugar derivatives from plant material. These compounds are common in the human colon and are potentially toxic. Bacteroides such as Bacteroides thetaiotaomicron converts these sugars to fermentation products which are beneficial to humans. Bacteroides also have the ability to remove side chains from bile acids, thus returning bile acids to the hepatic circulation.

There is data suggesting that members of Bacteroides affect the lean or obese phenotype in humans. In this article, one human twin is obese while the other is lean. When their fecal microbiota is transplanted into germ-free mice, the phenotype in the mouse model corresponds to that in humans.

Bacteroides are symbiont colonizers of their host intestinal niche and serve several physiological functions, some of which can be beneficial while others are detrimental. Bacteroides participate in the regulation of the intestinal micro-environment and carbohydrate metabolism with the capacity to adapt to the host environment by hydrolyzing bile salts. Some Bacteroides produce acetate and propionate during sugar fermentation. Acetate can prevent the transport of toxins from the gut to the blood while propionate can prevent the formation of tumors in the human colon.

Bacteroides such as Bacteroides uniformis may play a role in alleviating obesity. Low abundance of B. uniformis found in the intestine of formula-fed infants were associated with a high risk of obesity. Administering B. uniformis orally may alleviate metabolic and immune dysfunction which may contribute to obesity in mice. Similarly, Bacteroides acidifaciens may assist the activating fat oxidation in adipose tissue and thus could protect against obesity.

== See also ==
- CrAssphage
- Cytophaga
- Flavobacterium
