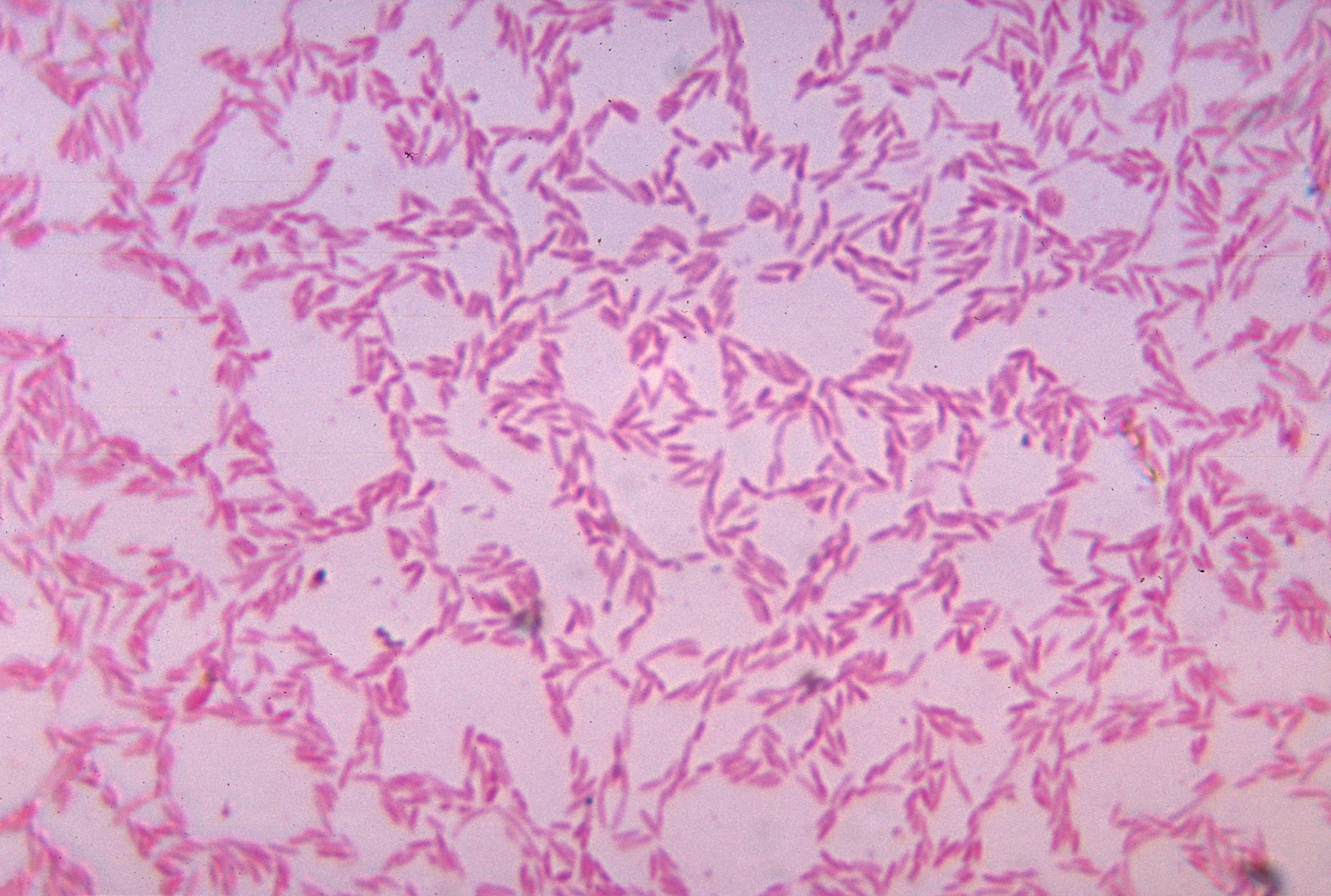
- Bacteroides biacutis anaerobically cultured in blood agar medium

Scientific classification
- Domain: Bacteria
- Kingdom: Pseudomonadati
- Phylum: Bacteroidota
- Class: Bacteroidia
- Order: Bacteroidales
- Family: Bacteroidaceae; Pribram 1933 (Approved Lists 1980)

Genera
- Acetofilamentum Dietrich et al. 1989; Acetothermus Dietrich et al. 1988; Bacteroides Castellani and Chalmers 1919 (Approved Lists 1980); Capsularis Prévot 1938 (Approved Lists 1980); "Desulfoarculus" Schnell et al. 1991; "Fusocillus" Prevot 1938; "Massilibacteroides" Jneid et al. 2018; Phocaeicola Al Masalma et al. 2009; "Ristella" Prevot 1938; "Sphaerophorus" Bergan and Hovig 1968; "Spherophorus" Prevot 1938

Synonyms
- "Ristellaceae" Prevot 1938; "Spherophoraceae" Prevot 1938

= Bacteroidaceae =

Family of bacteria

The Bacteroidaceae are a family of environmental gram-negative bacteria commonly found in the human gut microbiota.

== See also ==
- Phocaeicola vulgatus
