= List of mammals of the Philippines =

This is a list of the mammal species recorded in the Philippines.

== Order: Artiodactyla (even-toed ungulates and cetaceans) ==
| Image | Common name | Scientific name authority | Preferred habitat | IUCN status | Range |
|---|---|---|---|---|---|
Family Suidae: pigs
| | Palawan bearded pig | Sus ahoenobarbus Huet, 1888 | Forest | NT^{IUCN} ▼ | |
| | Bornean bearded pig | Sus barbatus S. Müller, 1838 | Wide range of habitats where occurring; Possibly extirpated | VU^{IUCN} ▼ | |
| | Visayan warty pig | Sus cebifrons Heude, 1888 | Forest and grassland | CR^{IUCN} ▼ | |
| | Oliver's warty pig | Sus oliveri Groves, 1997 | Forest and savanna grassland | VU^{IUCN} ▼ | |
| | Philippine warty pig | Sus philippensis Nehring, 1886 | Forest, shrubland, and grassland | VU^{IUCN} ▼ | |
| | Wild boar | Sus scrofa Linnaeus, 1758 | Wide variety of habitats | LC^{IUCN} Unknown | |
Family Tragulidae
| | Philippine mouse-deer | Tragulus nigricans Thomas, 1892 | Forest and shrubland | EN^{IUCN} ▼ | |
Family Cervidae: deer
| | Calamian deer | Axis calamianensis Heude, 1888 | Forest, savanna, and grassland | EN^{IUCN} ▼ | |
| | Sika deer | Cervus nippon Temminck, 1838 | Introduced to Solo Island; possibly extirpated | LC^{IUCN} ▲ | |
| | Visayan spotted deer | Rusa alfredi Sclater, 1870 | Forest, shrubland, and grassland | EN^{IUCN} ▼ | |
| | Philippine deer | Rusa marianna Desmarest, 1822 | Forest and grassland | VU^{IUCN} ▼ | |
Family Bovidae: cattle, antelope, sheep, goats
| | Tamaraw | Bubalus mindorensis Heude, 1888 | Forest, shrubland, and grassland | CR^{IUCN} ▼ | |
Family Balaenopteridae: rorquals
| | Common minke whale | Balaenoptera acutorostrata Lacépède, 1804 | Neritic and oceanic marine zones | LC^{IUCN} Unknown | |
| | Sei whale | Balaenoptera borealis Lesson, 1828 | Neritic and oceanic marine zones | EN^{IUCN} ▲ | |
| | Bryde's whale | Balaenoptera edeni Anderson, 1879 | Neritic and oceanic marine zones | LC^{IUCN} Unknown | |
| | Blue whale | Balaenoptera musculus Linnaeus, 1758 | Neritic and oceanic marine zones | EN^{IUCN} ▲ | |
| | Omura's whale | Balaenoptera omurai Wada, Oishi & Yamada, 2003 | Neritic and oceanic marine zones | DD^{IUCN} Unknown | |
| | Fin whale | Balaenoptera physalus Linnaeus, 1758 | Neritic and oceanic marine zones | VU^{IUCN} ▲ | |
| | Humpback whale | Megaptera novaeangliae Borowski, 1781 | Neritic and oceanic marine zones | LC^{IUCN} ▲ | |
Family Phocoenidae: porpoises
| | Indo-Pacific finless porpoise | Neophocaena phocaenoides G. Cuvier, 1829 | Coastal waters | VU^{IUCN} ▼ | |
Family Delphinidae: marine dolphins
| | Pygmy killer whale | Feresa attenuata J. E. Gray, 1874 | Oceanic marine zone | LC^{IUCN} Unknown | |
| | Short-finned pilot whale | Globicephala macrorhynchus Gray, 1846 | Oceanic marine zone | LC^{IUCN} Unknown | |
| | Risso's dolphin | Grampus griseus G. Cuvier, 1812 | Oceanic marine zone | LC^{IUCN} Unknown | |
| | Fraser's dolphin | Lagenodelphis hosei Fraser, 1956 | Neritic and oceanic marine zones | LC^{IUCN} Unknown | |
| | Irrawaddy dolphin | Orcaella brevirostris Owen in Gray, 1866 | Coastal waters and rivers | EN^{IUCN} ▼ | |
| | Orca | Orcinus orca Linnaeus, 1758 | Neritic and oceanic marine zones | DD^{IUCN} Unknown | |
| | Melon-headed whale | Peponocephala electra Gray, 1846 | Oceanic marine zone | LC^{IUCN} Unknown | |
| | False killer whale | Pseudorca crassidens Owen, 1846 | Neritic and oceanic marine zones | NT^{IUCN} Unknown | |
| | Indo-Pacific humpback dolphin | Sousa chinensis Osbeck, 1765 | Coastal waters | VU^{IUCN} ▼ | |
| | Pantropical spotted dolphin | Stenella attenuata Gray, 1846 | Neritic and oceanic marine zones | LC^{IUCN} Unknown | |
| | Striped dolphin | Stenella coeruleoalba Meyen, 1833 | Neritic and oceanic marine zones | LC^{IUCN} Unknown | |
| | Spinner dolphin | Stenella longirostris Gray, 1828 | Neritic and oceanic marine zones | LC^{IUCN} Unknown | |
| | Rough-toothed dolphin | Steno bredanensis G. Cuvier in Lesson, 1828 | Neritic and oceanic marine zones | LC^{IUCN} Unknown | |
| | Common bottlenose dolphin | Tursiops truncatus Montagu, 1821 | Coastal, neritic and oceanic marine zones | LC^{IUCN} Unknown | |
| | Indo-Pacific bottlenose dolphin | Tursiops aduncus Ehrenberg, 1833 | Neritic and oceanic marine zones | NT^{IUCN} Unknown | |
Family Physeteridae
| | Sperm whale | Physeter macrocephalus Linnaeus, 1758 | Neritic and oceanic marine zones | VU^{IUCN} Unknown | |
Family Kogiidae
| | Pygmy sperm whale | Kogia breviceps Blainville, 1838 | Oceanic marine zone | LC^{IUCN} Unknown | |
| | Dwarf sperm whale | Kogia sima Owen, 1866 | Oceanic marine zone | LC^{IUCN} Unknown | |
Family Ziphidae
| | Tropical bottlenose whale | Indopacetus pacificus Longman, 1926 | Oceanic marine zone | LC^{IUCN} Unknown | |
| | Blainville's beaked whale | Mesoplodon densirostris Blainville, 1817 | Oceanic marine zone | LC^{IUCN} Unknown | |
| | Ginkgo-toothed beaked whale | Mesoplodon ginkgodens Nishiwaki and Kamiya, 1958 | Oceanic marine zone | DD^{IUCN} Unknown | |
| | Cuvier's beaked whale | Ziphius cavirostris Cuvier, 1823 | Oceanic marine zone | LC^{IUCN} Unknown | |

== Order: Carnivora (carnivorans) ==
| Image | Common name | Scientific name authority | Preferred habitat | IUCN status | Range |
|---|---|---|---|---|---|
Family Felidae
| | Visayan leopard cat | Prionailurus bengalensis rabori Groves, 1997 | Forest | VU ▼ | |
| | Sunda leopard cat | Prionailurus javanensis Desmarest, 1816 | Split recently; not yet assessed by IUCN | | |
Family Viverridae
| | Binturong | Arctictis binturong Raffles, 1822 | Forest (arboreal) | VU^{IUCN} ▼ | |
| | Asian palm civet | Paradoxurus hermaphroditus Pallas, 1777 | Wide range of forest, plantation, and urban environments | LC^{IUCN} ▼ | |
| | Malayan civet | Viverra tangalunga Gray, 1832 | Forest and shrublands | LC^{IUCN} | |
Family Herpestidae: mongooses
| | Collared mongoose | Urva semitorquata Gray, 1832 | Forest | NT^{IUCN} ▼ | |
Family Mustelidae: mustelids
| | Asian small-clawed otter | Aonyx cinereus Illiger, 1815 | Wetland systems | VU^{IUCN} ▼ | |
Family Mephitidae: skunks and stink badgers
| | Palawan stink badger | Mydaus marchei Huet, 1887 | Forest and shrublands | LC^{IUCN} | |

== Order: Chiroptera (bats) ==
| Image | Common name | Scientific name authority | Preferred habitat | IUCN status | Range |
|---|---|---|---|---|---|
Family Pteropodidae: Old World fruit bats
| | Giant golden-crowned flying fox | Acerodon jubatus Eschscholtz, 1831 | Forest | EN^{IUCN} ▼ | |
| | Palawan fruit bat | Acerodon leucotis Sanborn, 1950 | Forest | VU^{IUCN} ▼ | |
| | Mindanao pygmy fruit bat | Alionycteris paucidentata Kock, 1969 | Forest | LC^{IUCN} | |
| | Lesser short-nosed fruit bat | Cynopterus brachyotis Müller, 1838 | Forest | LC^{IUCN} Unknown | |
| | Peters's fruit bat | Cynopterus luzoniensis Peters, 1861 | Forest | LC^{IUCN} | |
| | White-winged flying fox | Desmalopex leucopterus Temminck, 1853 | Forest and grassland | VU^{IUCN} ▼ | |
| | Small white-winged flying fox | Desmalopex microleucopterus Esselstyn et al, 2008 | Forest | EN^{IUCN} ▼ | |
| | Philippine naked-backed fruit bat | Dobsonia chapmani Rabor, 1952 | Caves and forest | CR^{IUCN} ▼ | |
| | Rickart's dyak fruit bat | Dyacopterus rickarti Helgen et al, 2007 | Caves and forest | EN^{IUCN} ▼ | |
| | Dayak fruit bat | Dyacopterus spadiceus Thomas, 1890 | Caves and forest | NT^{IUCN} ▼ | |
| | Greater nectar bat | Eonycteris major K. Andersen, 1910 | Caves and forest | NT^{IUCN} Unknown | |
| | Philippine dawn bat | Eonycteris robusta Miller, 1913 | Caves and forest | VU^{IUCN} ▼ | |
| | Cave nectar bat | Eonycteris spelaea Dobson, 1871 | Caves and forest | LC^{IUCN} ▼ | |
| | Fischer's pygmy fruit bat | Haplonycteris fischeri Lawrence, 1939 | Forest | LC^{IUCN} | |
| | Harpy fruit bat | Harpyionycteris whiteheadi Thomas, 1896 | Forest | LC^{IUCN} | |
| | Long-tongued nectar bat | Macroglossus minimus É. Geoffroy, 1810 | Forest | LC^{IUCN} | |
| | White-collared fruit bat | Ptenochirus wetmorei Taylor, 1934 | Forest | VU^{IUCN} ▼ | |
| | Philippine tube-nosed fruit bat | Nyctimene rabori Heaney & Peterson, 1984 | Forest | EN^{IUCN} ▼ | |
| | Luzon fruit bat | Otopteropus cartilagonodus Kock, 1969 | Forest | LC^{IUCN} ▼ | |
| | Greater musky fruit bat | Ptenochirus jagori Peters, 1861 | Forest | LC^{IUCN} | |
| | Lesser musky fruit bat | Ptenochirus minor Yoshiyuki, 1979 | Forest | LC^{IUCN} | |
| | Ryukyu flying fox | Pteropus dasymallus Temminck, 1825 | Forest | VU^{IUCN} ▼ | |
| | Gray flying fox | Pteropus griseus É. Geoffroy, 1810 | Forest | VU^{IUCN} ▼ | |
| | Small flying fox | Pteropus hypomelanus Temminck, 1853 | Forest | NT^{IUCN} ▼ | |
| | Little golden-mantled flying fox | Pteropus pumilus Miller, 1911 | Forest and shrublands | NT^{IUCN} ▼ | |
| | Philippine gray flying fox | Pteropus speciosus K. Andersen, 1908 | Forest | DD^{IUCN} Unknown | |
| | Large flying fox | Pteropus vampyrus Linnaeus, 1758 | Forest | NT^{IUCN} ▼ | |
| | Geoffroy's rousette | Rousettus amplexicaudatus É. Geoffroy, 1810 | Caves, rocky areas, and forests | LC^{IUCN} Unknown | |
| | Mindoro stripe-faced fruit bat | Styloctenium mindorensis Esselstyn, 2007 | Forest | EN^{IUCN} ▼ | |
Family Vespertilionidae
| | Common thick-thumbed bat | Glischropus tylopus Dobson, 1875 | Forest | LC^{IUCN} | |
| | Lesser hairy-winged bat | Harpiocephalus harpia Temminck C. J., 1840 | Forest | LC^{IUCN} ▼ | |
| | Pungent pipistrelle | Hypsugo mordax Peters, 1866 | Unknown | DD^{IUCN} Unknown | |
| | Peters's pipistrelle | Hypsugo petersi Meyer, 1899 | Forest | DD^{IUCN} Unknown | |
| | Hardwicke's woolly bat | Kerivoula hardwickii Horsfield, 1824 | Caves and forest | LC^{IUCN} | |
| | Papillose woolly bat | Kerivoula papillosa Temminck, 1840 | Forest | LC^{IUCN} | |
| | Clear-winged woolly bat | Kerivoula pellucida Waterhouse, 1845 | Forest | NT^{IUCN} ▼ | |
| | Whitehead's woolly bat | Kerivoula whiteheadi Thomas, 1894 | Forest and grassland | LC^{IUCN} Unknown | |
| | Alvarez's tube-nosed bat | Murina alvarezi < >Eger,Sedlock,Lim and Heaney, 2025 | Caves and forests | LC^{IUCN} Unknown | |
| | Peters's myotis | Myotis ater Peters, 1866 | Forest | LC^{IUCN} Unknown | |
| | Horsfield's bat | Myotis horsfieldii Temminck, 1840 | Caves and forest | LC^{IUCN} | |
| | Pallid large-footed myotis | Myotis macrotarsus Waterhouse, 1845 | Caves | LC^{IUCN} | |
| | Wall-roosting mouse-eared bat | Myotis muricola Gray, 1846 | Caves and forests | LC^{IUCN} | |
| | Orange-fingered myotis | Myotis rufopictus Waterhouse, 1845 | Forest | DD^{IUCN} Unknown | |
| | Rohu's bat | Philetor brachypterus Temminck, 1840 | Forest and grassland | LC^{IUCN} | |
| | Peters's trumpet-eared bat | Phoniscus jagorii Peters, 1866 | Forest and wetlands | LC^{IUCN} Unknown | |
| | Java pipistrelle | Pipistrellus javanicus Gray, 1838 | Caves and forest | LC^{IUCN} | |
| | Narrow-winged pipistrelle | Pipistrellus stenopterus Dobson, 1875 | Forest, shrubland, and grassland | LC^{IUCN} Unknown | |
| | Least pipistrelle | Pipistrellus tenuis Temminck C. J., 1840 | Forest, shrubland, and grassland | LC^{IUCN} | |
| | Greater Asiatic yellow bat | Scotophilus heathii Horsfield, 1831 | Forest and shrublands | LC^{IUCN} | |
| | Lesser Asiatic yellow bat | Scotophilus kuhlii Leach, 1821 | Forest and shrublands | LC^{IUCN} | |
| | Lesser bamboo bat | Tylonycteris pachypus Temminck C. J., 1840 | Forest | LC^{IUCN} Unknown | |
| | Greater bamboo bat | Tylonycteris robustula Thomas, 1915 | Caves and forests | LC^{IUCN} Unknown | |
Family Miniopteridae
| | Little bent-wing bat | Miniopterus australis Tomes, 1858 | Caves and forests | LC^{IUCN} | |
| | Philippine long-fingered bat | Miniopterus paululus Hollister, 1913 | Caves and forests | LC^{IUCN} Unknown | |
| | Great bent-winged bat | Miniopterus tristis Waterhouse, 1845 | Caves and forests | LC^{IUCN} Unknown | |
Family Molossidae
| | Wrinkle-lipped free-tailed bat | Chaerephon plicatus Buchanan, 1800 | Caves, rocky areas, savanna and forests | LC^{IUCN} Unknown | |
| | Lesser naked bat | Cheiromeles parvidens Miller & Hollister, 1921 | Caves and forests | LC^{IUCN} Unknown | |
| | Hairless bat | Cheiromeles torquatus Horsfield, 1824 | Caves and forests | LC^{IUCN} Unknown | |
| | Sulawesi free-tailed bat | Mops sarasinorum Meyer, 1899 | Forests | DD^{IUCN} Unknown | |
Family Emballonuridae
| | Small Asian sheath-tailed bat | Mops sarasinorum Eydoux and Gervais, 1836 | Caves and forest | LC^{IUCN} ▼ | |
| | Naked-rumped pouched bat | Saccolaimus saccolaimus Temminck, 1838 | Caves, forest, and savanna | LC^{IUCN} | |
| | Black-bearded tomb bat | Taphozous melanopogon Temminck, 1841 | Caves, rocky areas, shrubland and forests | LC^{IUCN} | |
Family Megadermatidae: false vampire bats
| | Lesser false vampire bat | Megaderma spasma Linnaeus, 1758 | Caves, rocky areas and forests | LC^{IUCN} Unknown | |
Family Rhinolophidae: horseshoe bats
| | Acuminate horseshoe bat | Rhinolophus acuminatus Peters, 1871 | Caves and forests | LC^{IUCN} Unknown | |
| | Arcuate horseshoe bat | Rhinolophus acuminatus Peters, 1871 | Caves and forests | DD^{IUCN} | |
| | Bornean horseshoe bat | Rhinolophus borneensis Peters, 1871 | Caves and forests | DD^{IUCN} | |
| | Creagh's horseshoe bat | Rhinolophus creaghi Thomas, 1896 | Caves and forests | LC^{IUCN} ▼ | |
| | Philippine forest horseshoe bat | Rhinolophus inops K. Andersen, 1905 | Forests | LC^{IUCN} | |
| | Large-eared horseshoe bat | Rhinolophus philippinensis Waterhouse, 1843 | Caves | LC^{IUCN} Unknown | |
| | Large rufous horseshoe bat | Rhinolophus rufus Eydoux & Gervais, 1836 | Caves and forest | NT^{IUCN} ▼ | |
| | Small rufous horseshoe bat | Rhinolophus subrufus K. Andersen, 1905 | Caves and forest | DD^{IUCN} Unknown | |
| | Yellow-faced horseshoe bat | Rhinolophus virgo K. Andersen, 1905 | Caves and forest | LC^{IUCN} | |
Family Hipposideridae: Old World leaf-nosed bats
| | Dusky leaf-nosed bat | Hipposideros ater Templeton, 1848 | Forest around limestone | LC^{IUCN} Unknown | |
| | Bicolored roundleaf bat | Hipposideros bicolor Temminck, 1853 | Caves and forests | LC^{IUCN} | |
| | Fawn leaf-nosed bat | Hipposideros cervinus Gould, 1854 | Caves and forests | LC^{IUCN} ▼ | |
| | Ashy roundleaf bat | Hipposideros cineraceus Blyth, 1853 | Caves and forest | LC^{IUCN} Unknown | |
| | Large Mindanao roundleaf bat | Hipposideros coronatus Peters, 1871 | Caves and forests | DD^{IUCN} Unknown | |
| | Diadem leaf-nosed bat | Hipposideros diadema É. Geoffroy, 1813 | Caves, savanna, and forests | LC^{IUCN} ▼ | |
| | Large Asian roundleaf bat | Hipposideros lekaguli Thonglongya & Hill, 1974 | Caves and forests | NT^{IUCN} ▼ | |
| | Philippine forest roundleaf bat | Hipposideros obscurus Peters, 1861 | Caves and forests | LC^{IUCN} Unknown | |
| | Philippine pygmy roundleaf bat | Hipposideros pygmaeus Waterhouse, 1843 | Caves and forests | LC^{IUCN} Unknown | |

== Order: Dermoptera (colugos) ==
| Image | Common name | Scientific name authority | Preferred habitat | IUCN status | Range |
|---|---|---|---|---|---|
Family Cynocephalidae: flying lemurs
| | Philippine flying lemur | Cynocephalus volans Linnaeus, 1758 | Lowland forest | LC^{IUCN} | |

== Order: Eulipotyphla (Hedgehogs, shrews, moles and relatives) ==
| Image | Common name | Scientific name authority | Preferred habitat | IUCN status | Range |
|---|---|---|---|---|---|
Family Erinaceidae: hedgehogs
| | Dinagat gymnure | Podogymnura aureospinula Heaney & Morgan, 1982 | Forest | EN^{IUCN} ▼ | |
| | Mindanao gymnure | Podogymnura truei Mearns, 1905 | Forest | LC^{IUCN} | |
Family Soricidae: shrews
| | Asian gray shrew | Crocidura attenuata Milne-Edwards, 1872 | Forest, shrubland, and grassland | LC^{IUCN} Unknown | |
| | Batak shrew | Crocidura batakorum Hutterer, 2007 | Forest | DD^{IUCN} Unknown | |
| | Mindanao shrew | Crocidura beatus Miller, 1910 | Forest | LC^{IUCN} ▼ | |
| | Greater Mindanao shrew | Crocidura grandis Miller, 1911 | Forest | DD^{IUCN} Unknown | |
| | Luzon shrew | Crocidura grayi Dobson, 1890 | Forest | LC^{IUCN} Unknown | |
| | Mindoro shrew | Crocidura mindorus Miller, 1910 | Forest | DD^{IUCN} Unknown | |
| | Negros shrew | Crocidura negrina Rabor, 1952 | Forest | EN^{IUCN} ▼ | |
| | Sibuyan shrew | Crocidura ninoyi Esselstyn & Goodman, 2010 | Forest | DD^{IUCN} Unknown | |
| | Palawan shrew | Crocidura palawanensis Taylor, 1934 | Forest and shrublands | LC^{IUCN} Unknown | |
| | Panay shrew | Crocidura panayensis Hutterer, 2007 | Forest | DD^{IUCN} Unknown | |
| | Palawan moss shrew | Palawanosorex muscorum Hutterer et al., 2018 | (Described in 2018; Not yet assessed in IUCN Red List) | | |
| | Asian house shrew | Suncus murinus Linnaeus, 1766 | Widespread | LC^{IUCN} | |

== Order: Pholidota (pangolins) ==
| Image | Common name | Scientific name authority | Preferred habitat | IUCN status | Range |
|---|---|---|---|---|---|
Family Manidae
| | Philippine pangolin | Manis culionensis de Elera, 1895 | Forest and shrublands | CR^{IUCN} ▼ | |

== Order: Primates ==
| Image | Common name | Scientific name authority | Preferred habitat | IUCN status | Range |
|---|---|---|---|---|---|
Family Lorisidae: lorises
| | Philippine slow loris | Nycticebus menagensis Lydekker, 1893 | Lowland forest | VU^{IUCN} ▼ | |
Family Tarsiidae: tarsiers
| | Philippine tarsier | Carlito syrichta Linnaeus, 1758 | Forest | NT^{IUCN} ▼ | |
Family Cercopithecidae: Old World monkeys
| | Crab-eating macaque | Macaca fascicularis Raffles, 1821 | Forest, wetlands, and intertidal marine zones | EN^{IUCN} ▼ | |
Family Hominidae: great apes
| | Human | Homo sapiens Linnaeus, 1758 | Widespread | LC ▲ | |

== Order: Rodentia (rodents) ==
| Image | Common name | Scientific name authority | Preferred habitat / notes | IUCN status | Range |
|---|---|---|---|---|---|
Family Hystricidae: Old World porcupines
| | Philippine porcupine | Hystrix pumila Günther, 1879 | Forest and forest/grassland mosaic | VU^{IUCN} ▼ | |
Family Sciuridae: squirrels
| | Philippine pygmy squirrel | Exilisciurus concinnus Thomas, 1888 | Lowland and montane forest | LC^{IUCN} | |
| | Palawan flying squirrel | Hylopetes nigripes Thomas, 1893 | Lowland forest | NT^{IUCN} ▼ | |
| | Basilan flying squirrel | Petinomys crinitus Hollister, 1911 | Forest, especially higher-elevation oak forest | LC^{IUCN} | |
| | Mindanao flying squirrel | Petinomys mindanensis Rabor, 1939 | Forest, especially middle elevations | LC^{IUCN} | |
| | Davao squirrel | Sundasciurus davensis Sanborn, 1952 | Lowland forest | DD^{IUCN} Unknown | |
| | Busuanga squirrel | Sundasciurus hoogstraali Sanborn, 1952 | Forest | LC^{IUCN} Unknown | |
| | Northern Palawan tree squirrel | Sundasciurus juvencus Thomas, 1908 | Lowland forest | LC^{IUCN} | |
| | Mindanao squirrel | Sundasciurus mindanensis Steere, 1890 | Forest | LC^{IUCN} Unknown | |
| | Culion tree squirrel | Sundasciurus moellendorffi Matschie, 1898 | Forest | NT^{IUCN} ▼ | |
| | Philippine tree squirrel | Sundasciurus philippinensis Waterhouse, 1839 | Forest and agricultural areas | LC^{IUCN} | |
| | Palawan montane squirrel | Sundasciurus rabori Heaney, 1979 | Old-growth oak montane forest | DD^{IUCN} Unknown | |
| | Samar squirrel | Sundasciurus samarensis Steere, 1890 | Forest | LC^{IUCN} Unknown | |
| | Southern Palawan tree squirrel | Sundasciurus steerii Günther, 1877 | Forest and plantations | LC^{IUCN} | |
Family Muridae: mice, rats, gerbils
| | Luzon broad-toothed rat | Abditomys latidens Sanborn, 1952 | Forest | DD^{IUCN} Unknown | |
| | Mindoro climbing rat | Anonymomys mindorensis Musser, 1981 | Forest | DD^{IUCN} Unknown | |
| | Luzon Cordillera forest mouse | Apomys abrae Sanborn, 1952 | Forest and grassland | LC^{IUCN} Unknown | |
| | Luzon Aurora forest mouse | Apomys aurorae Heaney, Balete, Alviola, Duya, Veluz, VandeVrede & Steppan, 2011 | Forest | LC^{IUCN} ▲ | |
| | Mount Banahaw forest mouse | Apomys banahao Heaney, Balete, Alviola, Duya, Veluz, VandeVrede & Steppan, 2011 | Mossy forest | LC^{IUCN} | |
| | Mount Tapulao forest mouse | Apomys brownorum Heaney, Balete, Alviola, Duya, Veluz, VandeVrede & Steppan, 2011 | Forest | DD^{IUCN} Unknown | |
| | Camiguin forest mouse | Apomys camiguinensis (Heaney & Tabaranza, 2006 | Forest | VU^{IUCN} Unknown | |
| | Luzon montane forest mouse | Apomys datae Meyer, 1899 | Forest and shrublands | LC^{IUCN} Unknown | |
| | Large Mindoro forest mouse | Apomys gracilirostris L.A. Ruedas, 1995 | Montane forest | LC^{IUCN} Unknown | |
| | Mount Apo forest mouse | Apomys hylocetes Mearns, 1905 | Montane forest | LC^{IUCN} | |
| | Mindanao montane forest mouse | Apomys insignis Mearns, 1905 | Montane forest | LC^{IUCN} ▼ | |
| | Mount Irid forest mouse | Apomys iridensis Heaney, Balete, Alviola, Duya, Veluz, VandeVrede & Steppan, 2011 | Forest | LC^{IUCN} Unknown | |
| | Mindanao lowland forest mouse | Apomys littoralis Sanborn, 1952 | Forest | DD^{IUCN} Unknown | |
| | Lubang forest mouse | Apomys lubangensis Heaney, Balete, Alviola, Duya, Veluz, VandeVrede & Steppan, 2011 | Forest | LC^{IUCN} Unknown | |
| | Luzon giant forest mouse | Apomys magnus Heaney, Balete, Alviola, Duya, Veluz, VandeVrede & Steppan, 2011 | Lowland and lower montane forest | LC^{IUCN} | |
| | Small Luzon forest mouse | Apomys microdon Hollister, 1913 | Forest | LC^{IUCN} Unknown | |
| | Mount Mingan forest mouse | Apomys minganensis Heaney, Balete, Alviola, Duya, Veluz, VandeVrede & Steppan, 2011 | Mossy forest | LC^{IUCN} | |
| | Least forest mouse | Apomys musculus Miller, 1911 | Montane forest | LC^{IUCN} | |
| | Long-nosed Luzon forest mouse | Apomys sacobianus Johnson, 1962 | Forest | LC^{IUCN} Unknown | |
| | Sierra Madre forest mouse | Apomys sierrae Heaney, Balete, Alviola, Duya, Veluz, VandeVrede & Steppan, 2011 | Forest | LC^{IUCN} | |
| | Luzon Zambales forest mouse | Apomys zambalensis Heaney, Balete, Alviola, Duya, Veluz, VandeVrede & Steppan, 2011 | Forest | LC^{IUCN} | |
| | Mount Isarog shrew-mouse | Archboldomys luzonensis Musser, 1982 | Montane and mossy forest | VU^{IUCN} | |
| | Large Cordillera shrew-mouse | Archboldomys maximus Balete, Rickart, Heaney, Alviola, M.V. Duya, M.R.M.Duya, Sosa & Jansa, 2012 | Montane forest | DD^{IUCN} | |
| | Large-toothed hairy-tailed rat | Batomys dentatus Miller, 1911 | Upper montane forest; only one record, from 1907 | DD^{IUCN} Unknown | |
| | Luzon hairy-tailed rat | Batomys granti Thomas, 1895 | Montane and mossy forest | LC^{IUCN} | |
| | Hamiguitan hairy-tailed rat | Batomys hamiguitan Balete, Heaney, Rickart, Quidlat, & Ibanez, 2008 | Forest | DD^{IUCN} Unknown | |
| | Dinagat hairy-tailed rat | Batomys russatus Musser, Heaney, & Tabaranza, Jr, 1998 | Lowland forest | EN^{IUCN} ▼ | |
| | Mindanao hairy-tailed rat | Batomys salomonseni Sanborn, 1953 | Montane and mossy forest | LC^{IUCN} | |
| | Mount Isarog hairy-tailed rat | Batomys uragon Balete et al., 2015 | Montane and mossy forest | LC^{IUCN} | |
| | Bagobo rat | Bullimus bagobus Mearns, 1905 | Forest | LC^{IUCN} | |
| | Camiguin forest rat | Bullimus gamay Rickart, Heaney & Tabaranza, 2002 | Montane and mossy forest | VU^{IUCN} ▼ | |
| | Large Luzon forest rat | Bullimus luzonicus Thomas, 1895 | Forest, shrubland, and cropland | LC^{IUCN} Unknown | |
| | Short-footed Luzon tree rat | Carpomys melanurus Thomas, 1895 | Montane and mossy forest | DD^{IUCN} Unknown | |
| | White-bellied Luzon tree rat | Carpomys phaeurus Thomas, 1895 | Mossy and montane forest | LC^{IUCN} Unknown | |
| | Palawan pencil-tailed tree mouse | Chiropodomys calamianensis Taylor, 1934 | Lowland forest | DD^{IUCN} Unknown | |
| | Isarog striped shrew-rat | Chrotomys gonzalesi (Rickart & Heaney, 1991 | Montane and mossy forest | NT^{IUCN} ▼ | |
| | Mindoro striped rat | Chrotomys mindorensis (Kellogg, 1945 | Forest and croplands | LC^{IUCN} Unknown | |
| | Sibuyan striped shrew-rat | Chrotomys sibuyanensis (Rickart, Heaney, Goodman & Jansa, 2005 | Mossy forest; only known from single location | DD^{IUCN} Unknown | |
| | Blazed Luzon shrew-rat | Chrotomys silaceus (Thomas, 1895 | Montane and mossy forest | LC^{IUCN} Unknown | |
| | Luzon striped rat | Chrotomys whiteheadi (Thomas, 1895 | Forest and croplands | LC^{IUCN} | |
| | Dinagat bushy-tailed cloud rat | Crateromys australis (Musser, Heaney & Rabor, 1985 | Forest | DD^{IUCN} Unknown | |
| | Panay cloudrunner | Crateromys heaneyi (Gonzales & Kennedy, 1996 | Forest | EN^{IUCN} ▼ | |
| | Ilin Island cloudrunner | Crateromys paulus Musser & Gordon, 1981 | Forest; Only known from one individual specimen at the Smithsonian, which was "discovered" to be a new species decades after being donated | DD^{IUCN} Unknown | |
| | Giant bushy-tailed cloud rat | Crateromys schadenbergi Meyer, 1895 | Oak-dominated forest | EN^{IUCN} ▼ | |
| | Northern Luzon shrew-rat | Crunomys fallax Thomas, 1897 | Forest; only known from one 19th Century specimen | DD^{IUCN} Unknown | |
| | Mindanao shrew-rat | Crunomys melanius Thomas, 1907 | Forest and cropland | LC^{IUCN} Unknown | |
| | Katanglad shrew-mouse | Crunomys suncoides (Rickart, Heaney, Tabaranza & Balete, 1998 | Known from a single specimen from Mount Kitanglad | DD^{IUCN} Unknown | |
| | Lesser ranee mouse | Haeromys pusillus Thomas, 1893 | Lowland forest | VU^{IUCN} ▼ | |
| | Gray-bellied mountain rat | Limnomys bryophilus (Rickart, Heaney & Tabaranza Jr., 2003 | Montane and mossy forest | LC^{IUCN} | |
| | Mindanao mountain rat | Limnomys sibuanus Mearns, 1905 | Montane and mossy forest | LC^{IUCN} | |
| | Palawan spiny rat | Maxomys panglima Robinson, 1921 | Forest | LC^{IUCN} | |
| | House mouse | Mus musculus Linnaeus, 1758 | Introduced; commensal with humans | LC^{IUCN} | |
| | Sierra Madre tree mouse | Musseromys anacuao Heaney, Balete, Rickart, Veluz & Jansa, 2014 | Montane and mossy forest | DD^{IUCN} Unknown | |
| | Mount Pulag tree mouse | Musseromys beneficus Heaney, Balete, Rickart, Veluz & Jansa, 2014 | Montane and mossy forest | DD^{IUCN} Unknown | |
| | Banahaw tree mouse | Musseromys gulantang Heaney, Balete, Rickart, Veluz & Jansa, 2009 | Forest | DD^{IUCN} Unknown | |
| | Amuyao tree mouse | Musseromys inopinatus Heaney, Balete, Rickart, Veluz & Jansa, 2014 | Montane and mossy forest | DD^{IUCN} Unknown | |
| | Palawan soft-furred mountain rat | Palawanomys furvus Musser & Newcomb, 1983 | Montane forest | LC^{IUCN} Unknown | |
| | Southern giant slender-tailed cloud rat | Phloeomys cumingi Waterhouse, 1839 | Forest and croplands | LC^{IUCN} ▼ | |
| | Northern Luzon giant cloud rat | Phloeomys pallidus Nehring, 1890 | Forest and scrublands | LC^{IUCN} | |
| | Ricefield rat | Rattus argentiventer Robinson & Kloss, 1916 | Introduced; ricefields and grasslands | LC^{IUCN} | |
| | Philippine forest rat | Rattus everetti Günther, 1879 | Forest | LC^{IUCN} | |
| | Polynesian rat | Rattus exulans Peale, 1848 | Widespread | LC^{IUCN} | |
| | Mindoro black rat | Rattus mindorensis Thomas, 1898 | Forest | LC^{IUCN} Unknown | |
| | Himalayan field rat | Rattus nitidus Hodgson, 1845 | Introduced; forest and cropland | LC^{IUCN} | |
| | Brown rat | Rattus norvegicus Berkenhout, 1769 | Introduced; commensal with humans | LC^{IUCN} | |
| | Black rat | Rattus rattus Linnaeus, 1758 | Introduced; commensal with humans | LC^{IUCN} | |
| | Tanezumi rat | Rattus tanezumi Temminck, 1844 | Introduced; commensal with humans | LC^{IUCN} ▲ | |
| | Tawitawi forest rat | Rattus tawitawiensis (Musser & Heaney, 1985 | Unknown | DD^{IUCN} Unknown | |
| | Malayan field rat | Rattus tiomanicus Miller, 1900 | Forest, grassland, and agricultural areas | LC^{IUCN} ▲ | |
| | Banahao shrew-rat | Rhynchomys banahao Balete, Rickart, Rosell-Ambal, Jansa & Heaney, 2007 | Montane forest | LC^{IUCN} Unknown | |
| | Isarog shrew-rat | Rhynchomys isarogensis (Musser & Freeman, 1981 | Montane forest | VU^{IUCN} | |
| | Mount Data shrew-rat | Rhynchomys soricoides Thomas, 1895 | Mossy forest | NT^{IUCN} ▼ | |
| | Tapulao shrew-rat | Rhynchomys tapulao (Balete, Rickart, Rosell-Ambal, Jansa & Heaney, 2007 | Montane and mossy forest | DD^{IUCN} Unknown | |
| | Kalinga shrew mouse | Soricomys kalinga Balete, Rickart & Heaney, 2006 | Montane and mossy forest | LC^{IUCN} Unknown | |
| | Co's shrew mouse | Soricomys leonardocoi Balete et al, 2012 | Montane and mossy forest | DD^{IUCN} | |
| | Southern Cordillera shrew mouse | Soricomys montanus Balete et al, 2012 | Montane and mossy forest | LC^{IUCN} | |
| | Sierra Madre shrew mouse | Soricomys musseri Rickart, Heaney, Tabaranza Jr, & Balete, 1998 | Montane and mossy forest | LC^{IUCN} Unknown | |
| | Müller's giant Sunda rat | Sundamys muelleri Jentink, 1879 | Forest | LC^{IUCN} ▼ | |
| | Long-footed rat | Tarsomys apoensis Mearns, 1905 | Montane and mossy forest | LC^{IUCN} | |
| | Spiny long-footed rat | Tarsomys echinatus (Musser & Heaney, 1992 | Forest | VU^{IUCN} ▼ | |
| | Luzon short-nosed rat | Tryphomys adustus Miller, 1910 | Forest and croplands | DD^{IUCN} Unknown | |

== Order: Scandentia (treeshrews) ==
| Image | Common name | Scientific name authority | Preferred habitat | IUCN status | Range |
|---|---|---|---|---|---|
Family Scandentia: treeshrews
| | Mindanao treeshrew | Tupaia everetti Thomas, 1892 | Mid-elevation forest | LC^{IUCN} | |
| | Palawan treeshrew | Tupaia palawanensis Matschie, 1898 | Lowland forest | LC^{IUCN} | |

== Order: Sirenia (manatees and dugongs) ==
| Image | Common name | Scientific name authority | Preferred habitat | IUCN status | Range |
|---|---|---|---|---|---|
Family Dugongidae
| | Dugong | Dugong dugon Müller, 1776 | Neritic and intertidal marine zones | VU^{IUCN} ▼ | |

== See also ==
- Category:Endemic fauna of the Philippines
- Wildlife of the Philippines
- List of threatened species of the Philippines
- Wild pigs of the Philippines
- List of birds of the Philippines
