= Small Mindoro forest mouse =

Scientific classification
- Kingdom: Animalia
- Phylum: Chordata
- Class: Mammalia
- Order: Rodentia
- Family: Muridae
- Genus: Apomys
- Species: A. minor

Binomial name
- Apomys minor Heaney, Balete, M. R. M. Duya, M. V. Duya, Kyriazis, Rickart, Steppan, & Rowsey, 2025

Species of rodent

The small Mindoro forest mouse (Apomys minor) is a species of rodent in the family Muridae, from the genus Apomys, in the subgenus Megapomys. It is found only in the island of Mindoro in the Philippines where was found at elevations between 300 and 1,280 m above sea level. Its natural habitat secondary lowland forest with an open canopy. The species is characterized by its small size, brown fur at the back, and bellies that are pale brown. It has a head–body length of 122 mm. Males (57–65 g) and females (57–66 g) weigh roughly the same. The conservation status of the species is not evaluated.

== Distribution ==
The species is known only from Mindoro Island, particularly in Mt Alibug and Mt. Wood, in the Mts. Iglit-Baco National Park.

== Etymology ==
The species named was derived from Latin minor, in reference to its small size.

== See also ==
- List of living mammal species described in the 2020s
