= Fringe-eared Mindoro forest mouse =

Scientific classification
- Kingdom: Animalia
- Phylum: Chordata
- Class: Mammalia
- Order: Rodentia
- Family: Muridae
- Genus: Apomys
- Species: A. crinitus

Binomial name
- Apomys crinitus Heaney, Balete, M. R. M. Duya, M. V. Duya, Kyriazis, Rickart, Steppan, & Rowsey, 2025

Species of rodent

The fringe-eared Mindoro forest mouse or long-haired Mindoro forest mouse (Apomys crinitus) is a species of rodent in the family Muridae, from the genus Apomys, in the subgenus Megapomys. It is found only in the island of Mindoro in the Philippines where was found at elevations between 140 and 880 m above sea level. Its natural habitat is deciduous karst forests. The species is characterized by its brown fur at the back, with bellies that are cream-colored, a mask of dark-color fur in the face, and tufts or fringe of conspicuous white hairs behind the ear. It has a head–body length of 128 mm. Generally, males (54–80 g) weigh more than females (60 g). The conservation status of the species is not evaluated.

== Distribution ==
The species is known only from Mindoro Island, at Mts. Talullah and Mangibok, in the Mts. Iglit-Baco National Park.

== Etymology ==
The specific epithet was derived from Latin crinitus which means long-haired, in reference to its characteristic fringe of white hair behind each ear.

== See also ==
- List of living mammal species described in the 2020s
