= Veluz's Mindoro forest mouse =

Scientific classification
- Kingdom: Animalia
- Phylum: Chordata
- Class: Mammalia
- Order: Rodentia
- Family: Muridae
- Genus: Apomys
- Species: A. veluzi

Binomial name
- Apomys veluzi Heaney, Balete, M. R. M. Duya, M. V. Duya, Kyriazis, Rickart, Steppan, & Rowsey, 2025

Species of rodent

The Veluz's forest mouse (Apomys veluzi) is a species of rodent in the family Muridae, from the genus Apomys, in the subgenus Megapomys. It is found only in the island of Mindoro in the Philippines where was found at elevations between 710 and 1,325 m above sea level. Its natural habitat is both lowland and montane forests. The species is characterized by its brown fur at the back, with bellies that are cream-colored, and a mask of dark-color fur in the face. . It has a head–body length of 129.1 mm. Males (57–65 g) and females (57–66 g) weigh roughly the same. The conservation status of the species is not evaluated.

== Distribution ==
The species is known only from Mindoro Island, particularly in the forests of Mt. Abra de Ilog.

== Etymology ==
The species was named to honor Maria Josefa Veluz, a mammalogist at the National Museum of Natural of the Philippines.

== See also ==
- List of living mammal species described in the 2020s
