= Katanglad shrew-mouse =

Conservation status
- Data Deficient (IUCN 3.1)

Scientific classification
- Kingdom: Animalia
- Phylum: Chordata
- Class: Mammalia
- Order: Rodentia
- Family: Muridae
- Genus: Crunomys
- Species: C. suncoides

Binomial name
- Crunomys suncoides Rickart, Heaney, Tabaranza & Balete 1998
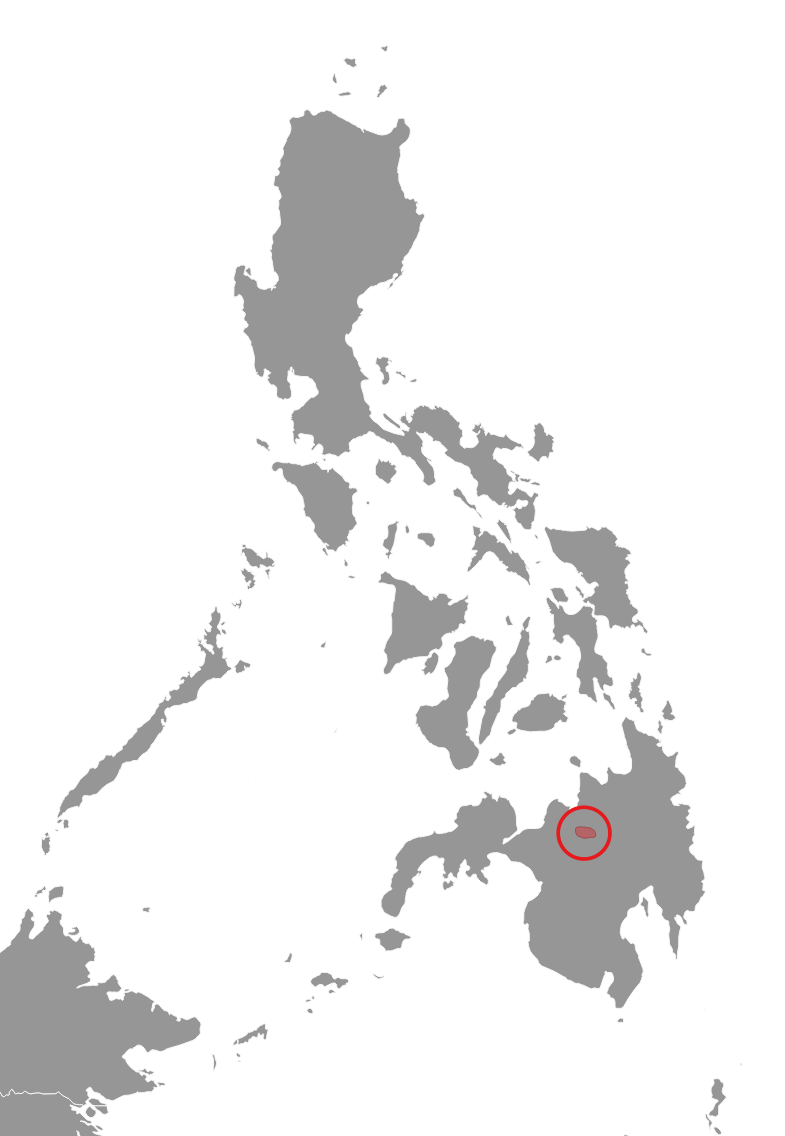

Species of rodent

The Katanglad shrew-mouse (Crunomys suncoides), also known as the Kitanglad shrew-mouse is a species of rodent in the family Muridae. It is known only from one specimen taken at 2250 m on Mount Kitanglad, Bukidnon Province, Philippines.

== Notes and references ==
The Katanglad shrew-mouse are mammals with small eyes, slender bodies, long whiskers, and chunky torsos. They prey on earthworms and soil invertebrates.
