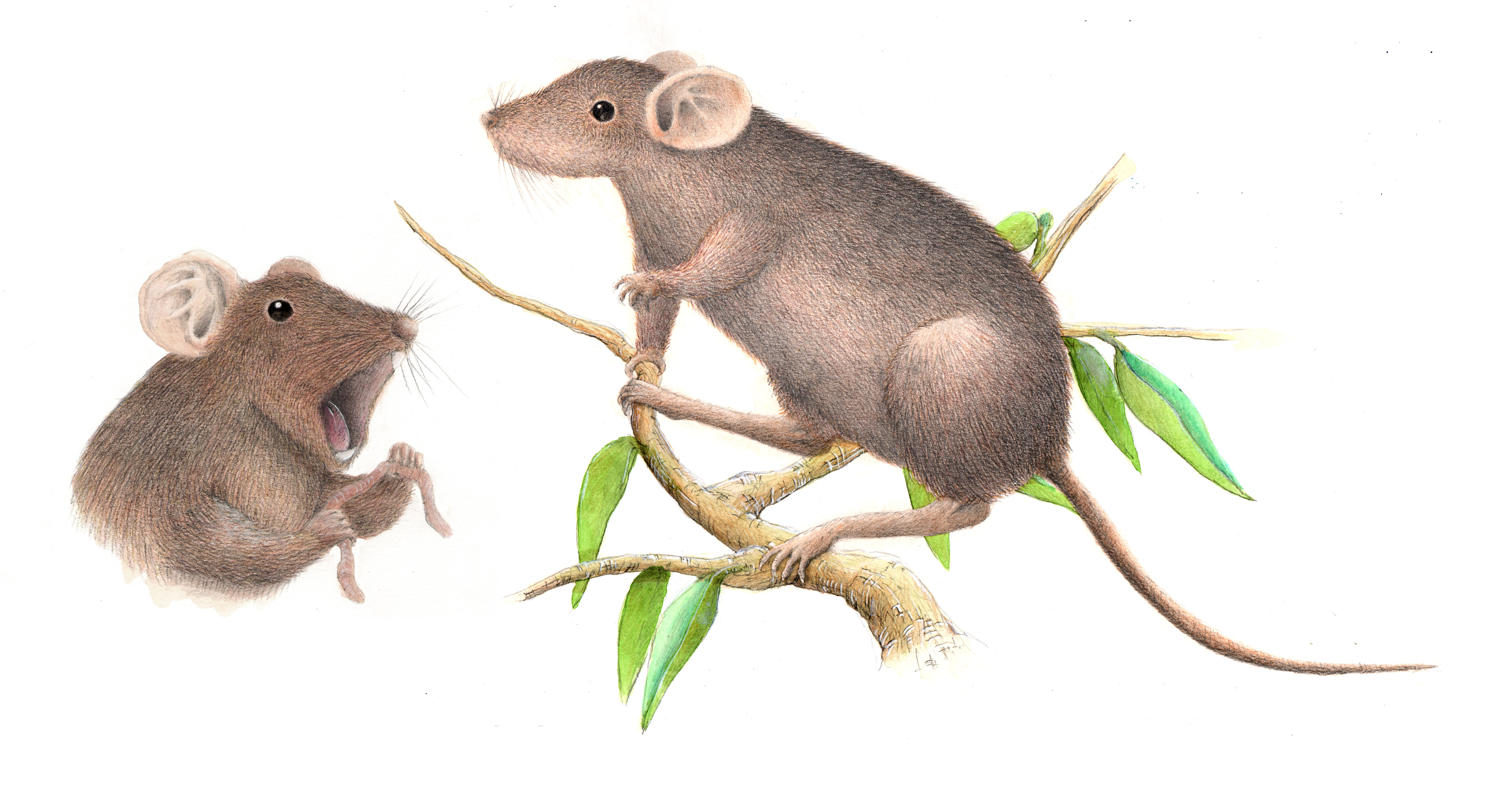

Conservation status
- Least Concern (IUCN 3.1)

Scientific classification
- Kingdom: Animalia
- Phylum: Chordata
- Class: Mammalia
- Order: Rodentia
- Family: Muridae
- Genus: Apomys
- Species: A. gracilirostris

Binomial name
- Apomys gracilirostris L.A. Ruedas, 1995
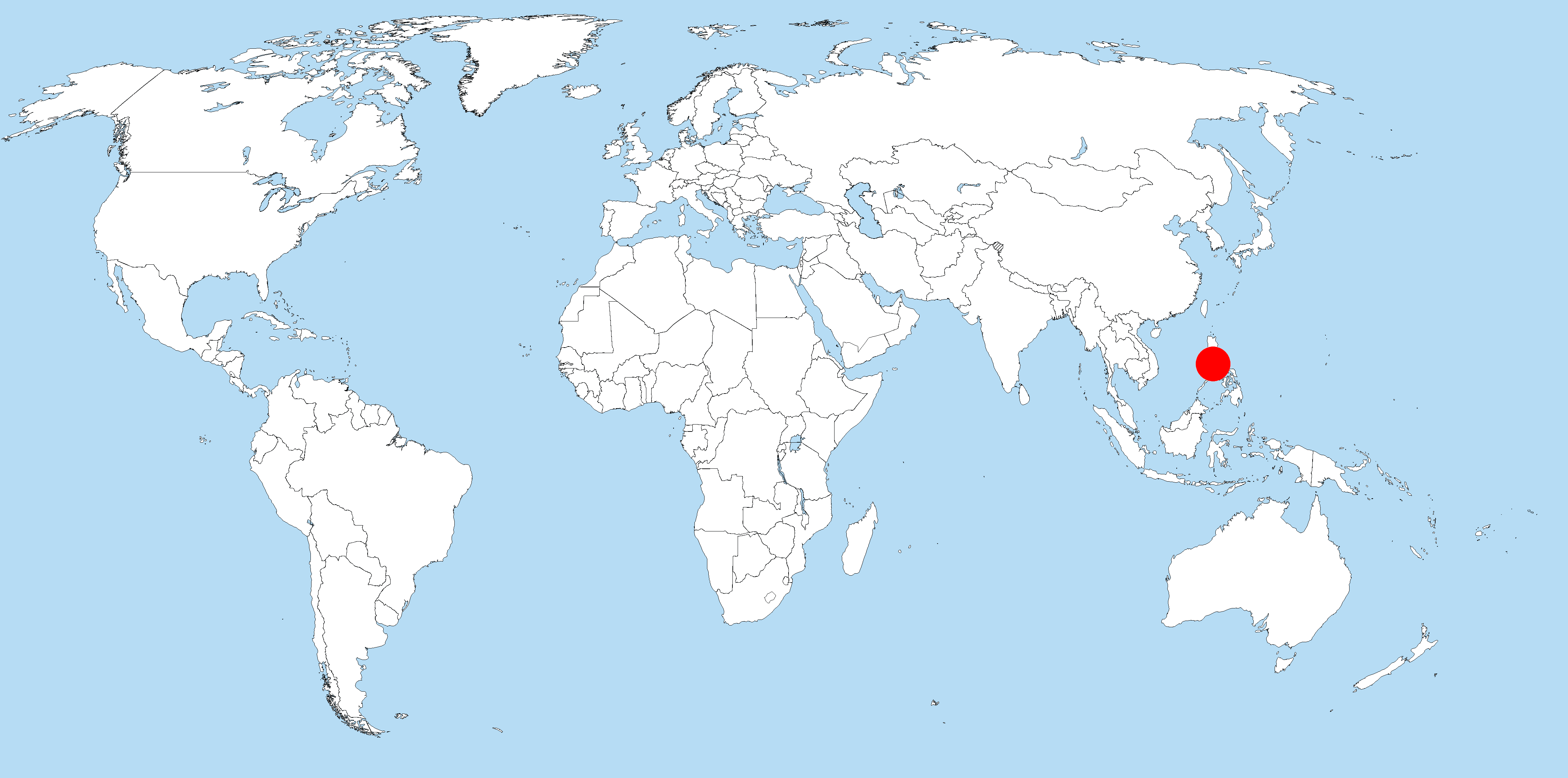
- Range of the large Mindoro forest mouse on global scale
- Range of the large Mindoro forest mouse within the Philippines (red)

= Large Mindoro forest mouse =

Species of rodent

The large Mindoro forest mouse (Apomys gracilirostris) is a species of rodent in the family Muridae, from the genus Apomys. It is found only in the Philippines. Its natural habitat is subtropical or tropical moist montane forests. It is a large mouse with large feet, a long tail and an elongated snout which is morphologically unique within its genus. It is covered in soft fur which is mostly dark brown in colour. Its closest relative is thought to be the Luzon montane forest mouse, based on genetic and morphological similarities.

== Discovery and taxonomy ==
In May and June 1992, an expedition to the Philippines was organised for the purpose of increasing the knowledge on their biodiversity. During this expedition, sixteen examples of a then unknown species of mouse were captured on Mount Halcon, on the island Mindoro. To this day, these animals, all captured between May 28 and June 12, 1992, remain the only known specimens of this species.

In 1995, in the scientific journal Proceedings of the Biological Society of Washington, biologist Luis A. Ruedas described the animal as Apomys gracilirostris. At the time it was the ninth known species of the endemic Filipino genus Apomys, and the second found on Mindoro, after Apomys musculus (least forest mouse). The editors of a compilation work on the indigenous mammals of the Philippines accepted the animal as a new species in 1998.

A. gracilirostris was the first newly described Apomys since 1962, when Apomys sacobianus (long-nosed Luzon forest mouse) was described. However, it was far from being the only new species discovered in the Philippines. Several new rodents had already been discovered in the eighties, one of which was actually from Mindoro as well (Anonymomys mindorensis or Mindoro climbing rat). A constant supply of new species remained in the years after the description of A. gracilirostris. In ten years time, eight new mammal species were added to the list. In 2006, another new Apomys was described: Apomys camiguinensis (Camiguin forest mouse). Apomys also comprises several species which are yet undescribed, two of which are from Mindoro. Another species from Mindoro, from the predominantly Indonesian genus Maxomys, has yet to receive its scientific name.

In accordance with the International Code of Zoological Nomenclature, the name Apomys gracilirostris is a binomen. The generic name, Apomys was proposed by American biologist Edgar Mearns in 1905 and has the meaning of "mouse from Mount Apo" (mys, μῦς, being the Ancient Greek word for "mouse"); this because the type species of the genus was first found on Mount Apo. The specific name, gracilirostris, is a combination of the Latin words gracilis "slender" and rostrum "snout" and refers to the animal's long, slender snout.

== Identification ==
The genus Apomys, of which the large Mindoro forest mouse is a member, can be identified by its small size, a long tail, elongate, narrow hind feet, the presence of four abdominal mammary glands, and a large number of skull characteristics. Within this genus, the large Mindoro forest mouse has several specific identifying features, the most important of which are its very thin and short upper incisors, long lower incisors and long snout. The tail and feet are also relatively long, even within the genus Apomys. The characteristics of the incisors are so peculiar that when Ruedas discovered the species, he initially thought he had found a new genus.

Table 1. Measurements of Apomys gracilirostris.
Measurement	Holotype	Females (four specimens)	Males (thirteen specimens)
Total length (mm)	294	306 ± 23 (283–330)	314 ± 31 (288–398)
Tail length (mm)	157	161 ± 13 (147–175)	159 ± 15 (135–185)
Hind foot length (mm)	39	37 ± 4 (33–41)	39 ± 3 (34–45)
Ear length (mm)	21	19.2 ± 1.3 (18–21)	19 ± 3 (14–22)
Weight (g)	80	89 ± 18 (75–115)	87 ± 18 (71–140)

The fur of the large Mindoro forest mouse is soft and smooth. The hairs of the dorsal fur are light gray near the root, and dark brown at the tip. Between the normal hairs are many black tactile hairs. This makes the dorsal fur appear dark brown, although recently captured animals have a dark blue-green hue. Some animals are darker around the midline of the back, and all are a lighter colour at the flanks. The colour of the ventral fur varies between animals, with it being a yellow-brown colour in some, slightly lighter coloured than the dorsal fur in others, still others having gray hairs with brown or silver-coloured tips in the ventral fur, and finally some animals showing no difference between the dorsal and ventral fur at all.

The tail is usually an even, dark colour, but in some animals the ventral side is somewhat darker. In some animals the tail ends in a white tip of 2 to 10 mm in length. The tail has fourteen scales per centimeter. The long, dark hind feet end in long claws (about 4 mm). The claws on the front feet are about 3 mm in length. The animal has seven cervical vertebrae, thirteen thoracic vertebrae, six lumbar vertebrae, three sacral vertebrae and thirty-two to thirty-five caudal vertebrae.

== Evolution and phylogenetic relationships ==
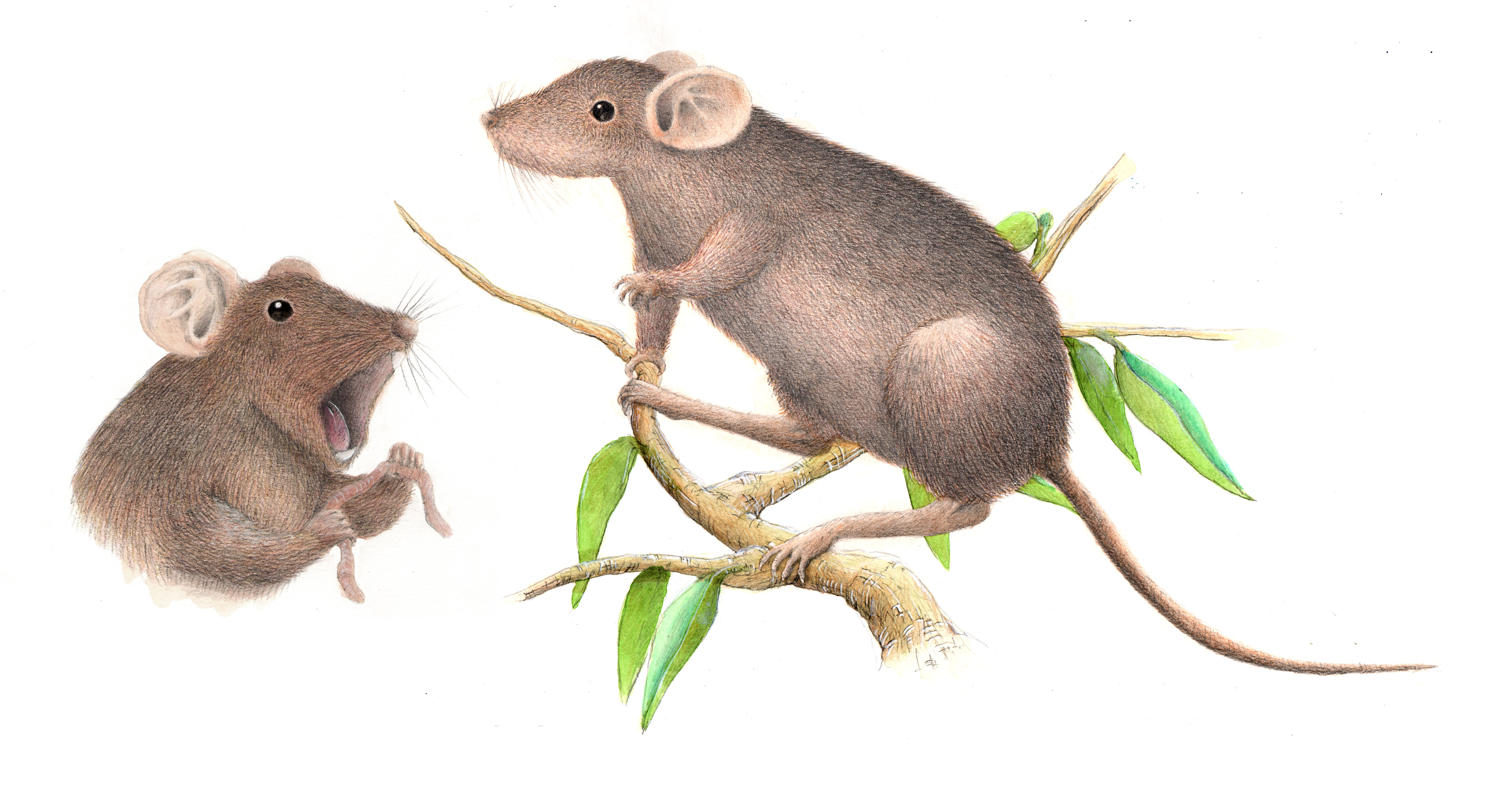
Apomys gracilirostris

The large Mindoro forest mouse belongs to the Chrotomys division, a group within the Murinae that occurs exclusively on the Philippines and in addition to Apomys also includes Rhynchomys, Chrotomys and Archboldomys. Animals in this division share several morphological and genetic features. Within this group, Apomys is by far the biggest and most extensive genus, containing small, inconspicuous wood mice which are common to the whole of the Philippines, while the other, more specialized genera are barely ever found outside Luzon. Apomys itself was divided in two groups by American biologist Guy Musser in 1982, the first being the datae group, containing only the Luzon montane forest mouse (A. datae), and the second the abrae-hylocetes group, containing all other species. Animals in these two groups differ in the way in which the head is supplied with blood from arteries. Ruedas placed the large Mindiro forest mouse in the datae group. This relationship is further supported by other similarities: both species are relatively large for the genus and have a relatively long snout.

In 2003, a phylogenetic study was published which compared DNA sequences from the cytochrome b gene of thirteen species of Apomys. This study confirmed the proposed relationship between the large Mindoro forest mouse (A. gracilirostris) and the Luzon montane forest mouse (A. datae).

The phylogenetic relationships of the large Mindoro forest mouse can be summarized as follows.

- Chrotomys division
  - - Apomys
      - datae group
        - Apomys gracilirostris
        - Apomys datae
      - abrae-hylocetes group (other species)
  - - Rhynchomys
    - Chrotomys
    - Archboldomys

This study also found that the large Mindoro forest mouse was the only Apomys species that displayed deep within-species divergences, which were calculated to date back some 400.000 years. The split between the large Mindoro forest mouse and the Luzon montane forest mouse dates back further still at an estimated three million years ago, putting it in the Pliocene. Apomys itself in turn was found to date back more than four million years, while the Chromotys division was estimated to go back another two million years. These dates were all calculated using a molecular clock.

Another, more elaborate phylogenetic study on all of the endemic Filipino genera and species of Murinae, of which the large Mindoro forest mouse is a member, produced different results. According to this study, the Chromotys division originated some ten million years ago (rather than the estimate of six million years ago from the previous study). It was further calculated that the split between the Chromotys division and its closest relatives, a predominantly African group including Mus, Otomys and Mastomys, had happened about sixteen million years ago. However, since the fossil record of Murinae from the Philippines is non-existent, and controversial for Murinae from other areas, these estimates can only be based on the molecular clock, and not on direct paleontological data.

The large Mindoro forest mouse is the third known rodent endemic to Mindoro, after the Mindoro black rat and the Mindoro climbing rat, and not including the Ilin Island cloudrunner, the occurrence of which has not been confirmed on the island. However, in a compilation work on the indigenous mammals of the Philippines, published in 1998, it was announced that there is a second Apomys on Mindoro. This species has yet to be described and has temporarily been given the name of "Apomys sp. E". It may be related to two other undescribed species from Sibuyan Island and Greater Negros-Panay, Apomys sp. A/C and Apomys sp. B. The local population of A. musculus, the only other Apomys known on the island, may also represent a separate species. Several other species occur exclusively on Mindoro (in addition to the undescribed Maxomys species mentioned earlier), including Oliver's warty pig, the tamaraw and the megabat Styloctenium mindorensis. The relatively large number of endemic species on Mindoro can be explained from the fact that, in all probability, Mindoro was never connected to any other landmass. This enabled the animals present on the island to develop in isolation from their relatives.

A remarkable biogeographical aspect of Mindoro is its status as a transition area between Greater Palawan and the rest of the Philippines. On the one hand, species like Oliver's warty pig and the tamaraw are clearly related to animals from Greater Palawan and the rest of South-East Asia, but on the other, Mindoro also harbours animals from genera like Apomys and Chrotomys, which are clearly Filipino. The latter animals reached Mindoro from Luzon, or possibly in some cases Greater Negros-panay. The large Mindoro forest mouse, with its close relationship to the Luzon montane forest mouse, probably falls into the group of animals that reached the island from Luzon.

== Ecology and behaviour ==
Table 2. Data from all known specimens of A. gracilirostris.
Number (CMNH)	Number (PNM)	Date	Site	Altitude	Sex and other data
634	3475	–	3	app. 1,900 m (6,200 ft)	Male
635	3476	–	3	app. 1,900 m (6,200 ft)	Female
636	–	–	3	app. 1,900 m (6,200 ft)	Female
637	3477	–	3	app. 1,900 m (6,200 ft)	Male
639	–	–	3	app. 1,900 m (6,200 ft)	Male
640	–	–	3	app. 1,900 m (6,200 ft)	Male
641	3478	–	3	app. 1,900 m (6,200 ft)	Male
642	–	May 28	2	app. 1,255 m (4,117 ft)	Young male
643	3439	June 1	2	app. 1,255 m (4,117 ft)	Adult female
644	–	June 4	1	app. 1,580 m (5,180 ft)	Young male
645	–	June 7	1	app. 1,580 m (5,180 ft)	Young male
646	–	June 7	1	app. 1,700 m (5,600 ft)	Adult female
647	–	June 9	1	app. 1,700 m (5,600 ft)	Young adult male
648	3480	June 10	1	app. 1,700 m (5,600 ft)	Adult male
649	3481	June 11	1	app. 1,700 m (5,600 ft)	Old male
650	3482	June 12	1	app. 1,580 m (5,180 ft)	Adult male (holotype)

The large Mindoro forest mouse has been found at three different sites in the municipality of San Teodoro, on the North flank of Mount Halcon. These sites are located at altitudes between 1,255 and 1,900 m (4,117 and 6,234 ft). There is a good possibility, however, that the large Mindoro forest mouse also occurs on other mountains on Mindoro, especially on the northern part of the island, which is home to large areas of undamaged cloud forest.

The lowest forests in which the large Mindoro forest mouse has been found, at some 1,250 m (4,100 ft) above sea level, are mostly between 14 and 16 m (46 and 52 ft) in height, with the very tallest reaching 20 m (66 ft). The dominant species of tree are from the genera Leptospermum flavescens, Tristaniopsis and Lithocarpus, from the families Myrtaceae and Fagaceae. These very humid forests have a dense understory vegetation, which consists, amongst other plants, of mosses, tree ferns and species of Pandanus. At higher altitudes (between 1,600 and 1,950 m or 5,250 and 6,400 ft) the forest is dominated by bamboo, while the only tree species present is Agathis philippinensis. Here, vegetation reaches a height between 7 and 10 m (23 and 33 ft). There are many smaller plants present, such as ferns, orchids and species of Pandanus. The forest floor is covered with a layer of leaves with a thickness between 6 and 8 cm (2.4 and 3.1 in).

Nothing is known with any certainty about the behaviour of the large Mindoro forest mouse. The long snout, small upper incisors and long lower incisors suggest that the animal feeds on soft invertebrates, but this is not certain. Furthermore, the long tail and elongated hind feet with well-developed claws point towards a climbing lifestyle.

Very little is also known about the animal's procreation habits. A female specimen was found to carry three embryos. Another female had a swollen uterus, and testicles were visible in several of the male specimens.

== Bibliography ==
- Musser, G.G. (1982). "The definition of Apomys, a native rat of the Philippine islands". American Museum Novitates. Results of the Archbold Expeditions No. 108 (2746): 1–43.
- Musser, G. G.; Carleton, M. D. (2005). "Superfamily Muroidea". In Wilson, D. E.; Reeder, D. M. (eds.). Mammal Species of the World: A Taxonomic and Geographic Reference (3rd ed.). Johns Hopkins University Press. pp. 894–1531. ISBN 978-0-8018-8221-0. OCLC 62265494.
