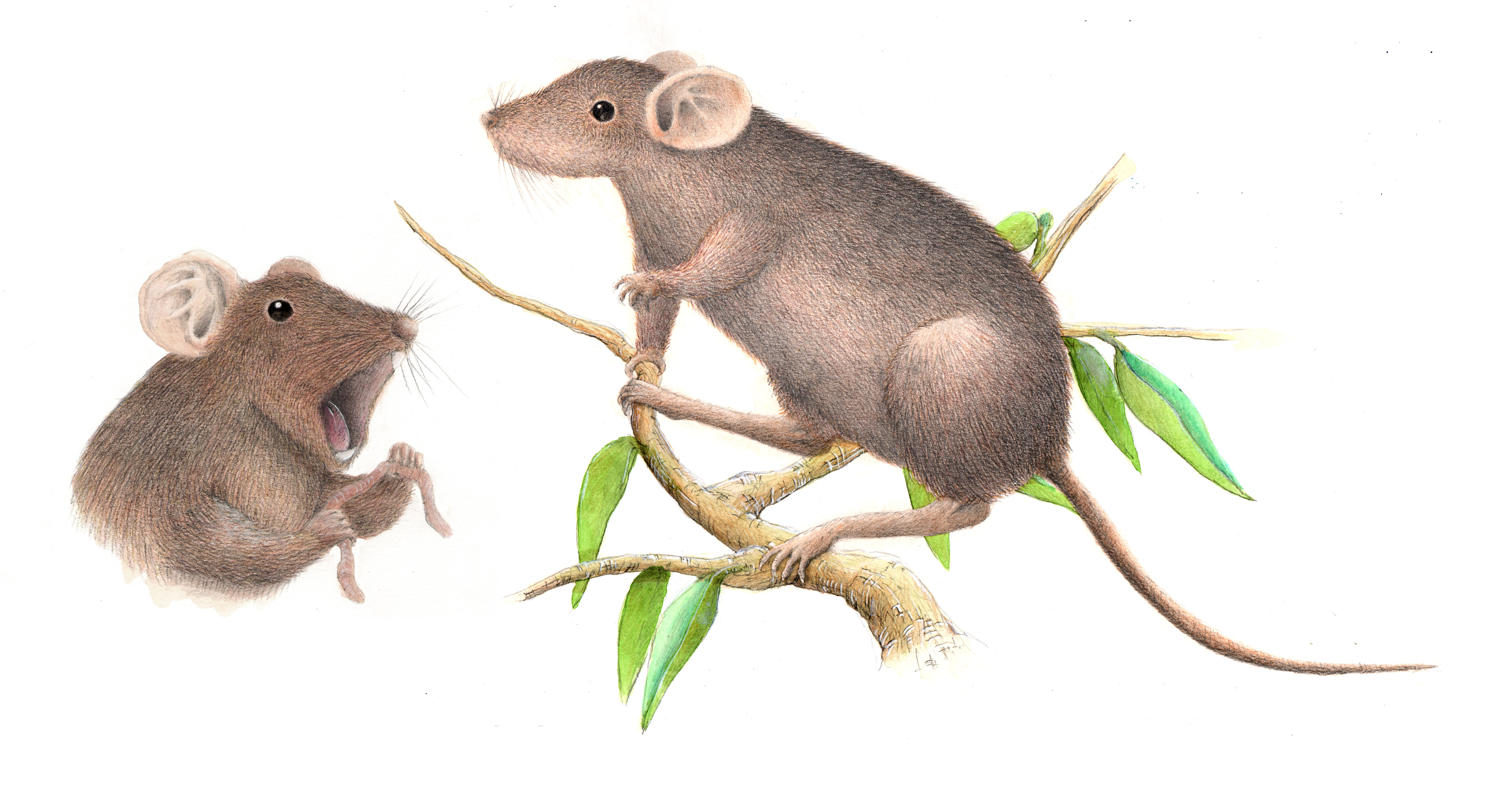
- Large Mindoro forest mouse (Apomys gracilirostris)

Scientific classification
- Kingdom: Animalia
- Phylum: Chordata
- Class: Mammalia
- Order: Rodentia
- Family: Muridae
- Subfamily: Murinae
- Tribe: Hydromyini
- Genus: Apomys; Mearns, 1905

Type species
- Apomys hylocetes Mearns, 1905

Species
- Apomys abrae Apomys aurorae Apomys banahao Apomys brownorum Apomys camiguinensis Apomys crinitus Apomys datae Apomys gracilirostris Apomys hylocetes Apomys insignis Apomys iridensis Apomys littoralis Apomys lubangensis Apomys magnus Apomys microdon Apomys minganensis Apomys minor Apomys musculus Apomys sacobianus Apomys sierrae Apomys veluzi Apomys zambalensis

= Apomys =

Genus of rodents

Apomys, commonly known as earthworm mice, is a genus of rodent endemic to the Philippines. Mice belonging to this genus are generally called Philippine forest mice and can be found on most islands of the Philippines except in Palawan, the Sulu Archipelago, and the Batanes and Babuyan group of islands.

Apomys mice weigh from 18g to 128g. The tail is longer or nearly equal the length of the head and body. The soft and thick fur of these mice is darker on the back while the front fur is paler, often nearly white with a moderate orange yellow wash. The hind feet are moderately long and narrow, have six plantar pads, and have digits 2–4 notably longer than digit 5 and the hallux. All species have two pairs of inguinal mammae.

== Species ==
Twenty-two species are known in two subgenera:

Members of the subgenus Apomys' are smaller, longer-tailed and tree-dwelling species

  - Camiguin forest mouse, A. camiguinensis Heaney & Tabaranza, 2006
  - Mount Apo forest mouse, A. hylocoetes Mearns, 1905
  - Mindanao montane forest mouse, A. insignis Mearns, 1905
  - Mindanao lowland forest mouse, A. littoralis Sanborn, 1952
  - Small Luzon forest mouse, A. microdon Hollister, 1913
  - Least forest mouse, A. musculus Miller, 1911
- Members of the subgenus Megapomys are larger, shorter-tailed and primarily ground-dwelling species
  - Luzon Cordillera forest mouse, A. abrae Sanborn, 1952
  - Luzon Aurora forest mouse, A. aurorae Heaney, Balete, Alviola, Duya, Veluz, VandeVrede & Steppan, 2011
  - Mount Banahaw forest mouse, A. banahao Heaney, Balete, Alviola, Duya, Veluz, VandeVrede & Steppan, 2011
  - Mount Tapulao forest mouse, A. brownorum Heaney, Balete, Alviola, Duya, Veluz, VandeVrede & Steppan, 2011
  - Fringe-eared Mindoro forest mouse, A. crinitus Heaney, Balete, M. R. M. Duya, M. V. Duya, Kyriazis, Rickart, Steppan, & Rowsey, 2025
  - Luzon montane forest mouse, A. datae Meyer, 1899
  - Large Mindoro forest mouse, A. gracilirostris Ruedas, 1995
  - Mount Irid forest mouse, A. iridensis Heaney, Balete, Veluz, Steppan, Esseltyn, Pfeiffer & Rickart, 2014
  - Lubang forest mouse, A. lubangensis Heaney, Balete, Veluz, Steppan, Esseltyn, Pfeiffer & Rickart, 2014
  - Large forest mouse, A. magnus Heaney, Balete, Alviola, Duya, Veluz, VandeVrede & Steppan, 2011
  - Mount Mingan forest mouse, A. minganensis Heaney, Balete, Alviola, Duya, Veluz, VandeVrede & Steppan, 2011
  - Small Mindoro forest mouse, A. minor Heaney, Balete M. R. M. Duya, M. V. Duya, Kyriazis, Rickart, Steppan, & Rowsey, 2025
  - Long-nosed Luzon forest mouse, A. sacobianus Johnson, 1962
  - Sierra Madre forest mouse, A. sierrae Heaney, Balete, Alviola, Duya, Veluz, VandeVrede & Steppan, 2011
  - Veluz's Mindoro forest mouse, A. veluzi Heaney, Balete, M. R. M. Duya, M. V. Duya, Kyriazis, Rickart, Steppan, & Rowsey, 2025
  - Luzon Zambales forest mouse, A. zambalensis Heaney, Balete, Alviola, Duya, Veluz, VandeVrede & Steppan, 2011

Several species also await formal description.

The species generally inhabit narrow ecological niches with small endemic ranges.

== See also ==
- Cloud rat
