= Lubang forest mouse =

Scientific classification
- Kingdom: Animalia
- Phylum: Chordata
- Class: Mammalia
- Order: Rodentia
- Family: Muridae
- Genus: Apomys
- Species: A. lubangensis

Binomial name
- Apomys lubangensis Heaney, Balete, Veluz, Steppan, Esselstyn, Pfeiffer & Rickart, 2014
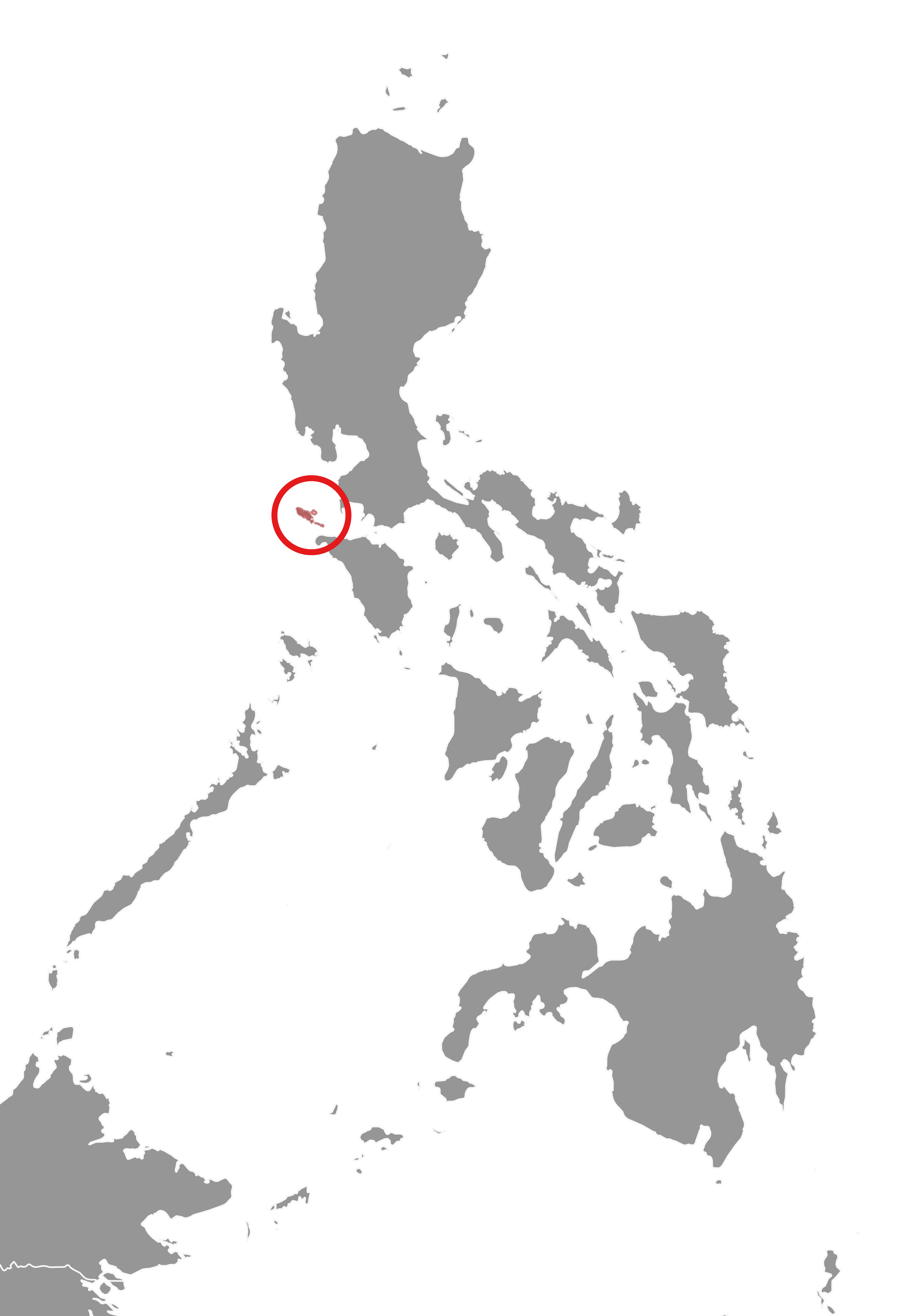

Species of rodent

The Lubang forest mouse (Apomys lubangensis) is a forest mouse endemic to Lubang Island in the Philippines.
