= Luzon Cordillera forest mouse =

Conservation status
- Least Concern (IUCN 3.1)

Scientific classification
- Kingdom: Animalia
- Phylum: Chordata
- Class: Mammalia
- Order: Rodentia
- Family: Muridae
- Genus: Apomys
- Species: A. abrae

Binomial name
- Apomys abrae (Sanborn, 1952)
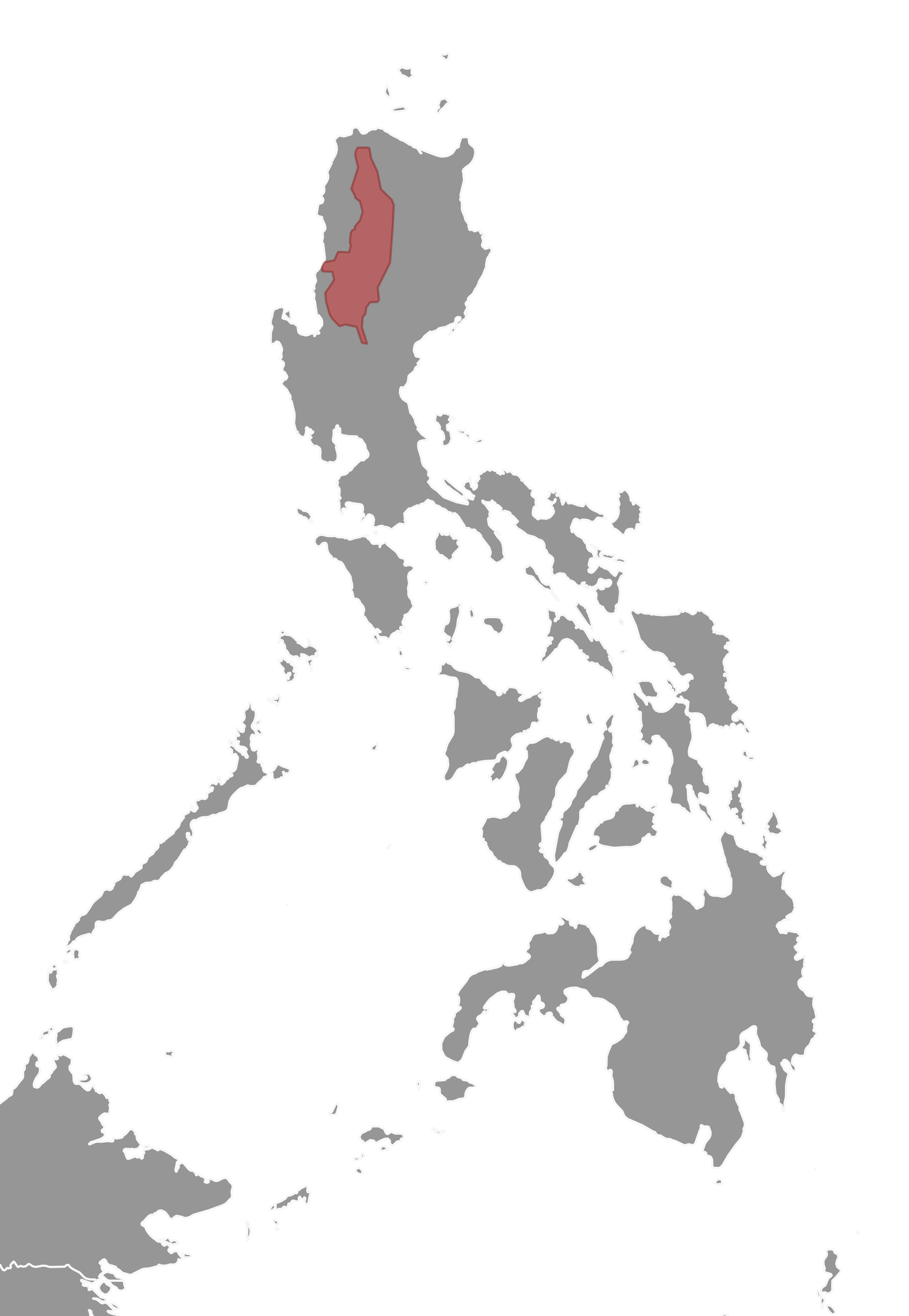

Species of rodent

The Luzon Cordillera forest mouse (Apomys abrae) is a species of rodent in the family Muridae found in the Philippines.
