= Mindanao lowland forest mouse =

Conservation status
- Data Deficient (IUCN 3.1)

Scientific classification
- Domain: Eukaryota
- Kingdom: Animalia
- Phylum: Chordata
- Class: Mammalia
- Order: Rodentia
- Family: Muridae
- Genus: Apomys
- Species: A. littoralis

Binomial name
- Apomys littoralis (Sanborn, 1952)
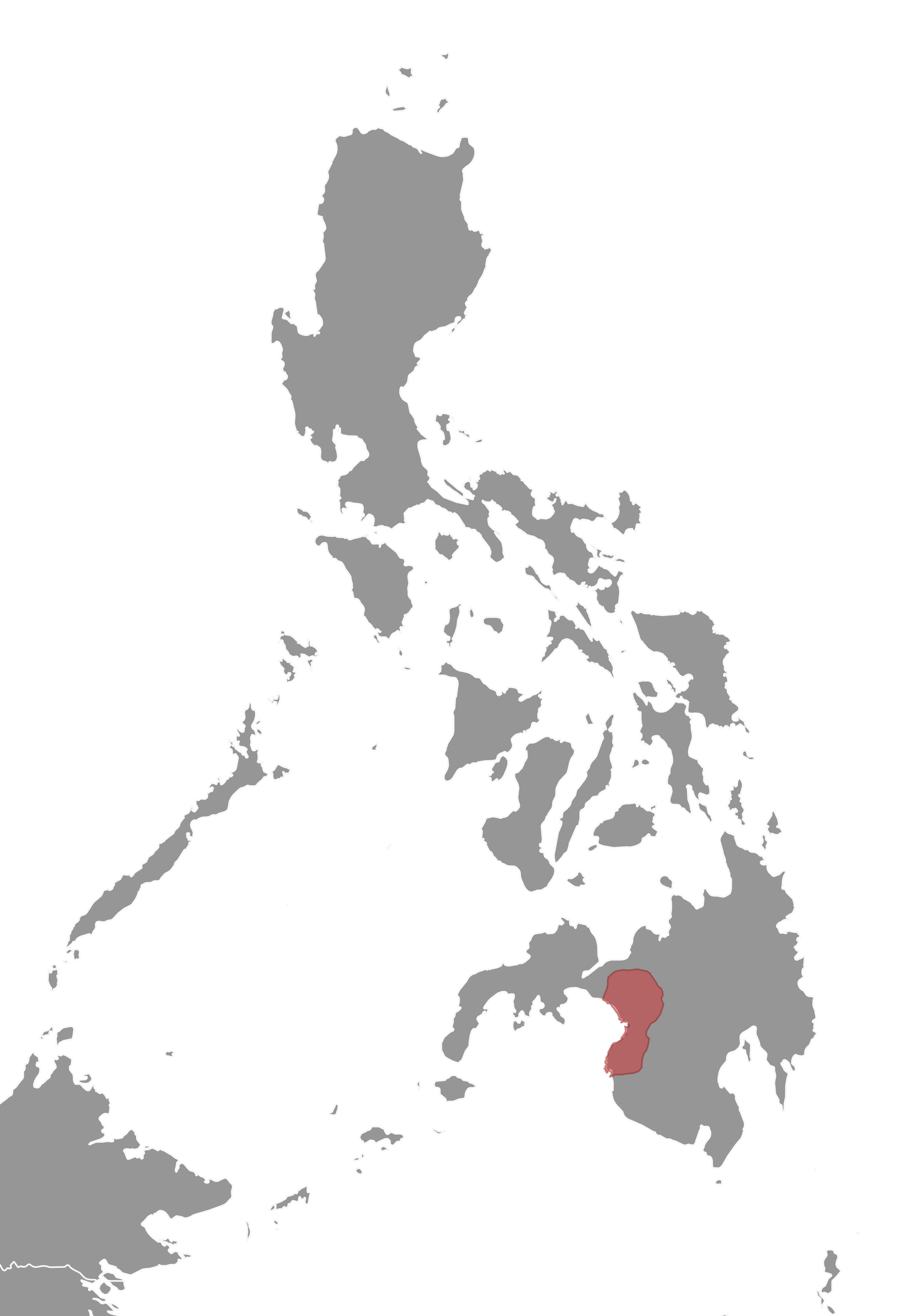

Species of rodent

The Mindanao lowland forest mouse (Apomys littoralis) is a species of rodent in the family Muridae. It is found only in the Philippines.
