= Mount Irid forest mouse =

Scientific classification
- Kingdom: Animalia
- Phylum: Chordata
- Class: Mammalia
- Order: Rodentia
- Family: Muridae
- Genus: Apomys
- Species: A. iridensis

Binomial name
- Apomys iridensis Heaney, Balete, Veluz, Steppan, Esselstyn, Pfeiffer & Rickart, 2014
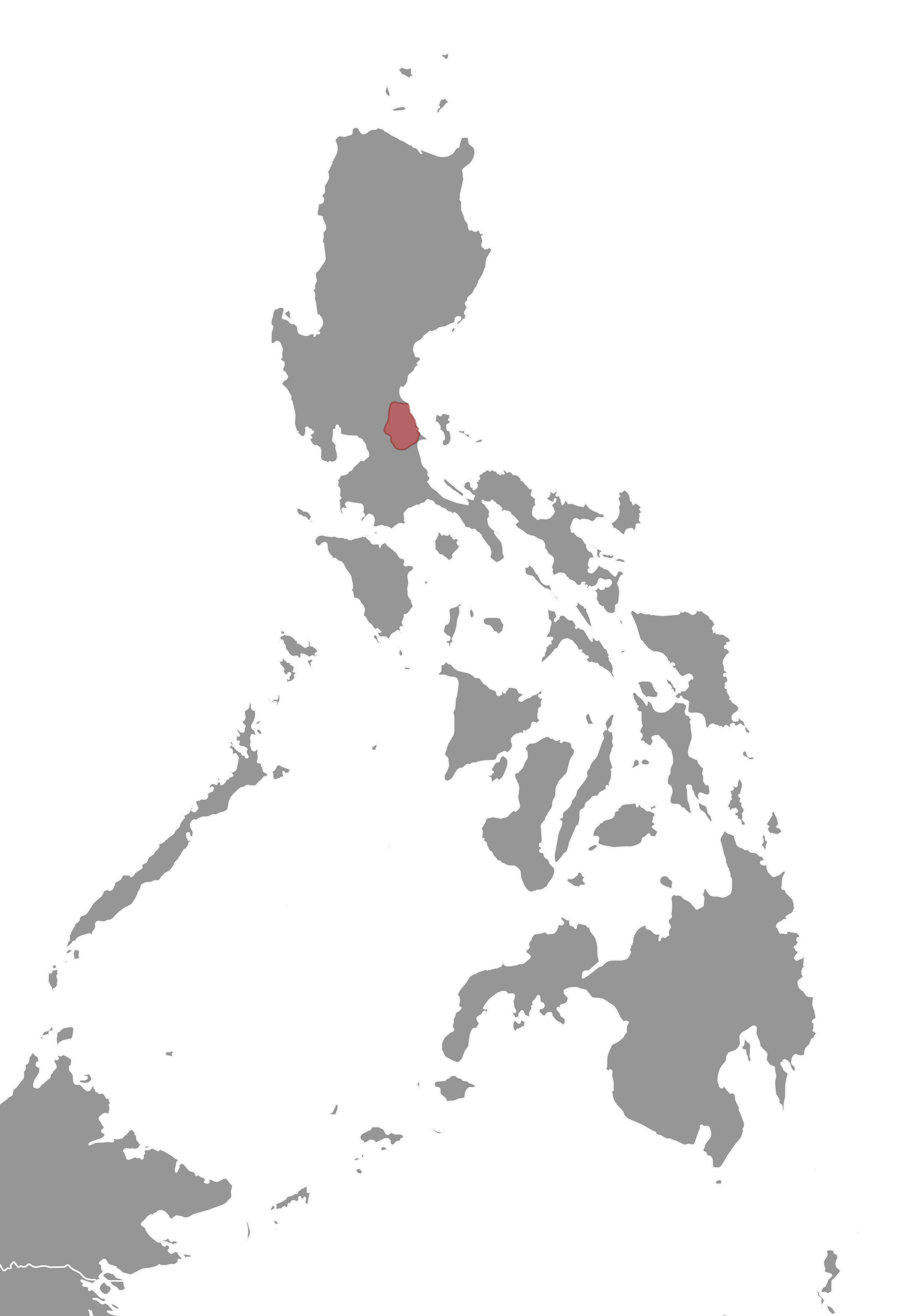

Species of rodent

The Mount Irid forest mouse (Apomys iridensis) is a forest mouse endemic to Mount Irid in Luzon, Philippines.
