= Luzon Zambales forest mouse =

Scientific classification
- Kingdom: Animalia
- Phylum: Chordata
- Class: Mammalia
- Order: Rodentia
- Family: Muridae
- Genus: Apomys
- Species: A. zambalensis

Binomial name
- Apomys zambalensis Heaney, Balete, Alviola, Duya, Veluz, VandeVrede & Steppan, 2011
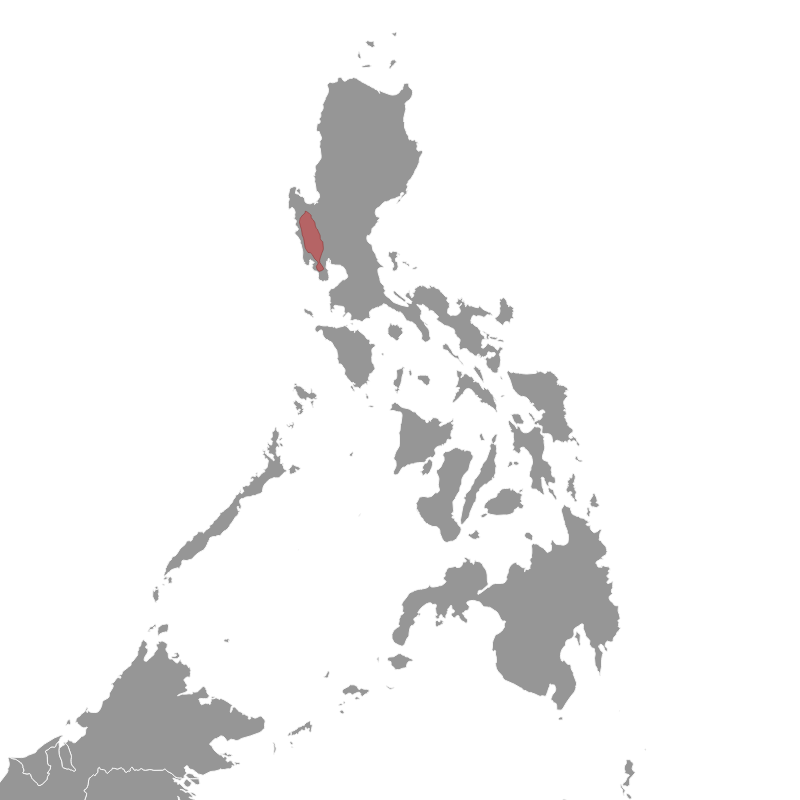

Species of mammal

The Luzon Zambales forest mouse (Apomys zambalensis) is a forest mouse endemic to Zambales in Luzon, Philippines.
