= Mount Apo forest mouse =

Conservation status
- Least Concern (IUCN 3.1)

Scientific classification
- Kingdom: Animalia
- Phylum: Chordata
- Class: Mammalia
- Order: Rodentia
- Family: Muridae
- Genus: Apomys
- Species: A. hylocetes

Binomial name
- Apomys hylocetes Mearns, 1905
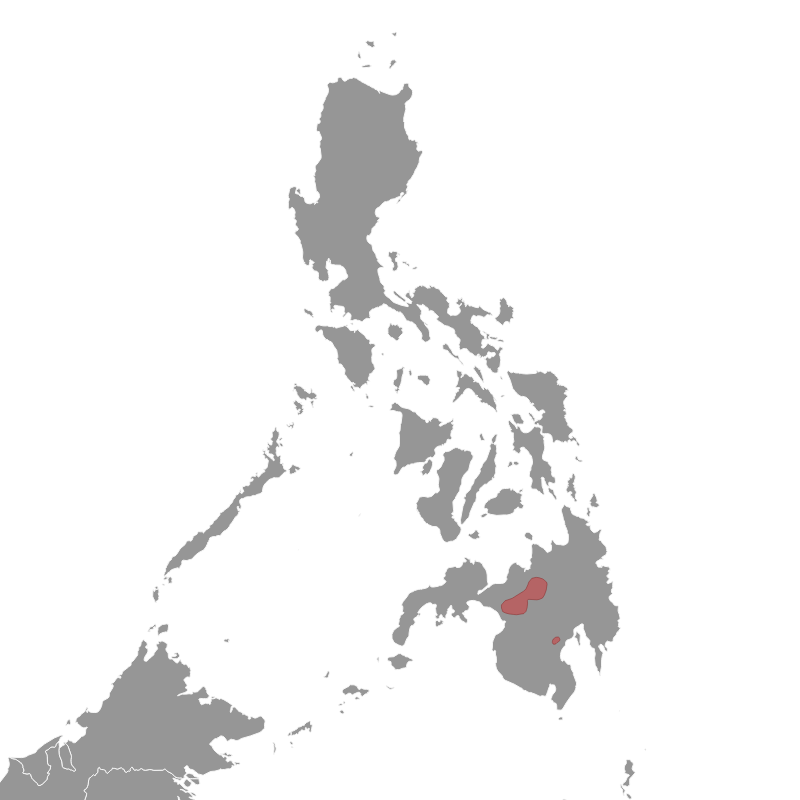

Species of rodent

The Mount Apo forest mouse (Apomys hylocetes) is a species of rodent in the family Muridae. It is found only in the Philippines.
