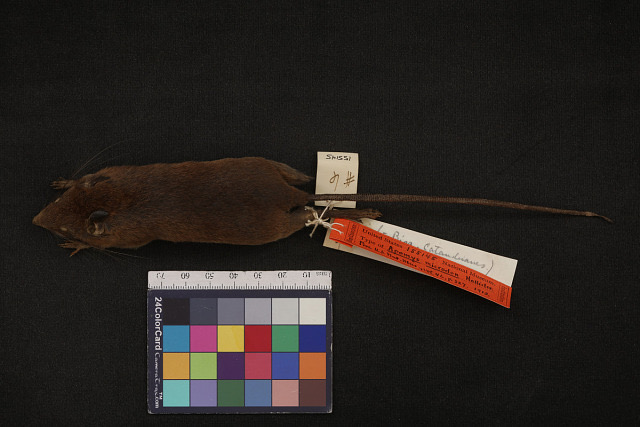
- A specimen of Apomys microdon

Conservation status
- Least Concern (IUCN 3.1)

Scientific classification
- Kingdom: Animalia
- Phylum: Chordata
- Class: Mammalia
- Order: Rodentia
- Family: Muridae
- Genus: Apomys
- Species: A. microdon

Binomial name
- Apomys microdon Hollister, 1913
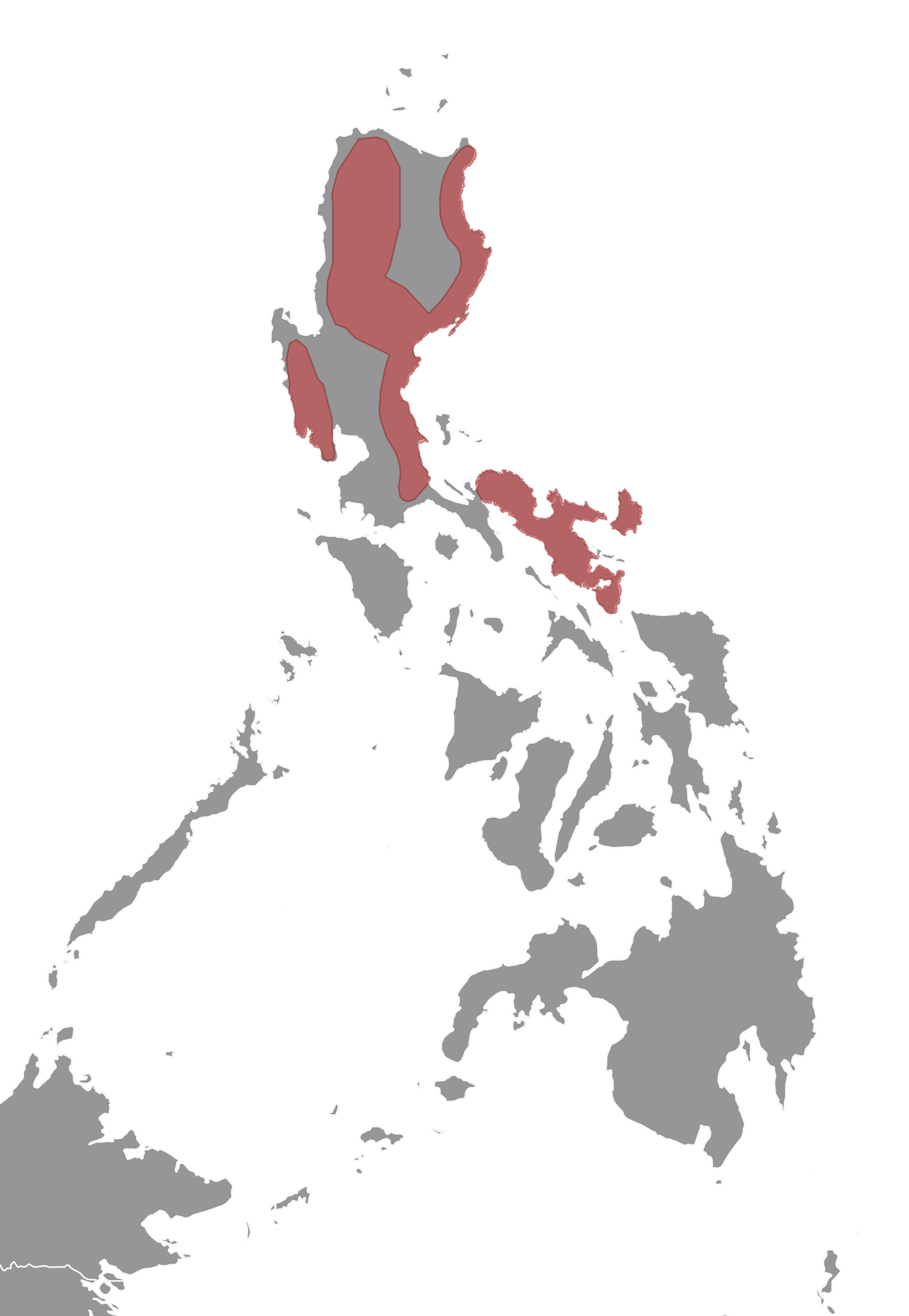

= Small Luzon forest mouse =

Species of rodent

The small Luzon forest mouse (Apomys microdon) is a species of rodent in the family Muridae. It is found only in the Philippines.
