= Sierra Madre forest mouse =

Scientific classification
- Kingdom: Animalia
- Phylum: Chordata
- Class: Mammalia
- Order: Rodentia
- Family: Muridae
- Genus: Apomys
- Species: A. sierrae

Binomial name
- Apomys sierrae Heaney, Balete, Alviola, Duya, Veluz, VandeVrede & Steppan, 2011
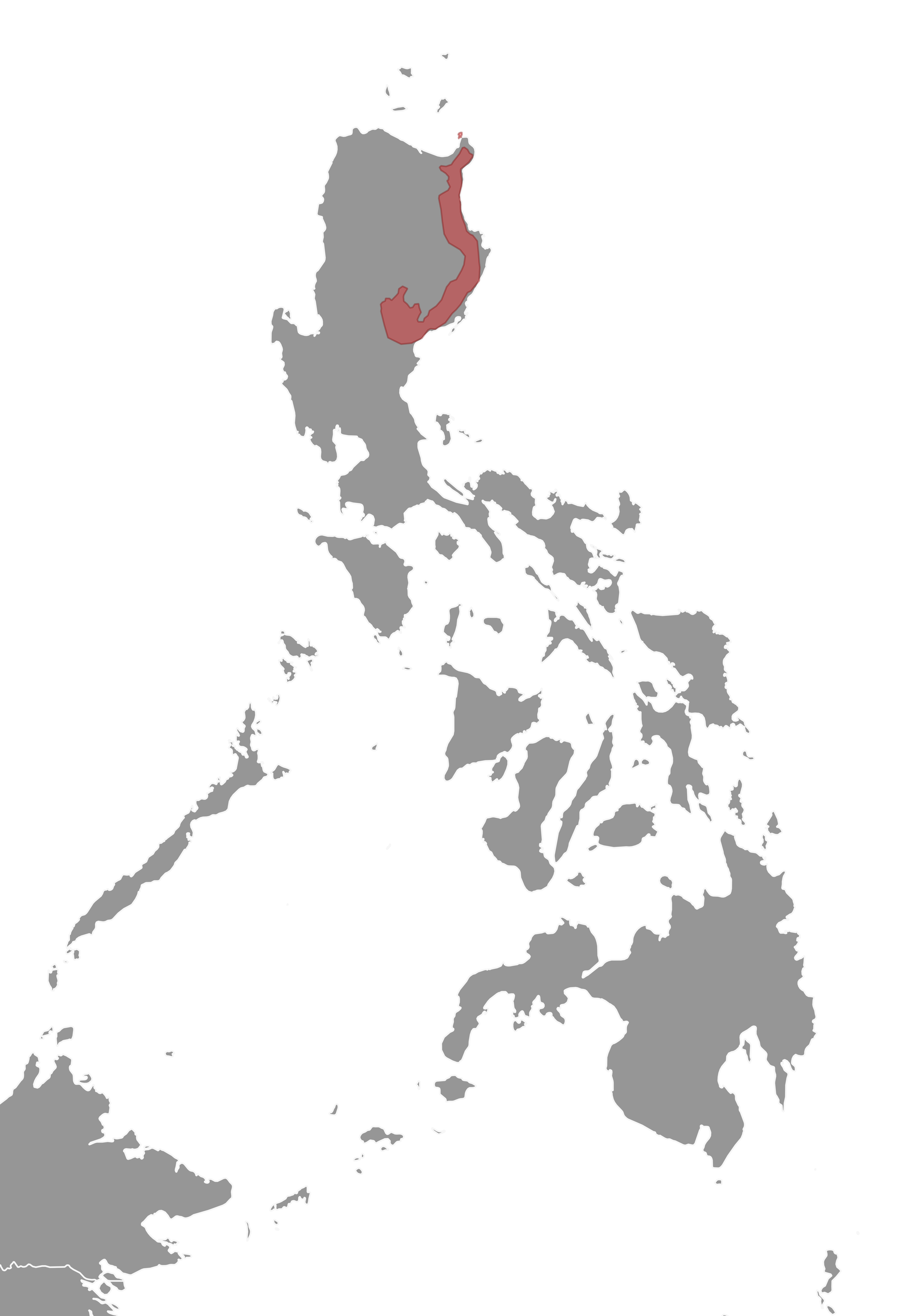

Mammal found in the Philippines

The Sierra Madre forest mouse (Apomys sierrae) is a forest mouse endemic to the Sierra Madre Range of eastern Luzon, Philippines.
