= Mount Banahaw forest mouse =

Scientific classification
- Kingdom: Animalia
- Phylum: Chordata
- Class: Mammalia
- Order: Rodentia
- Family: Muridae
- Genus: Apomys
- Species: A. banahao

Binomial name
- Apomys banahao Heaney, Balete, Alviola, Duya, Veluz, VandeVrede & Steppan, 2011
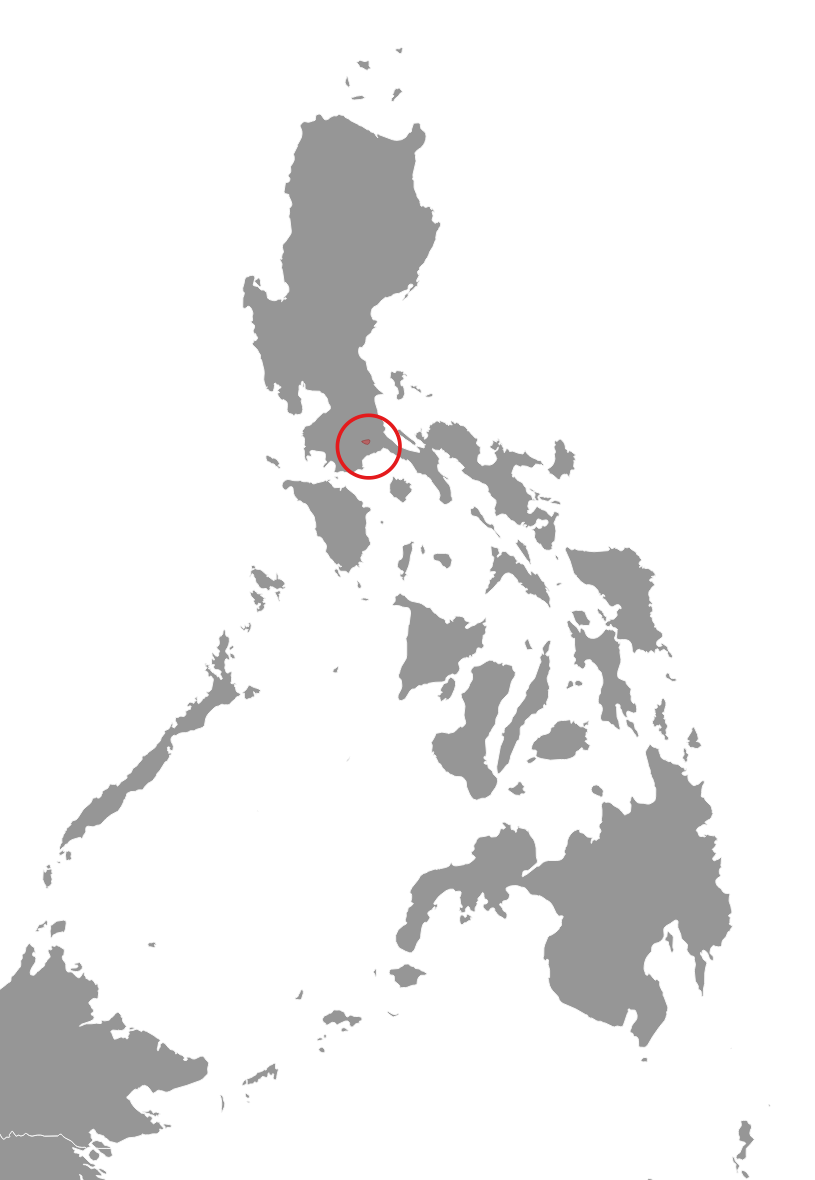

Mammal found in the Philippines

The Mount Banahaw forest mouse (Apomys banahao) is a forest mouse endemic to the Mount Banahaw area in the Philippines.
