= Mount Tapulao forest mouse =

Scientific classification
- Kingdom: Animalia
- Phylum: Chordata
- Class: Mammalia
- Order: Rodentia
- Family: Muridae
- Genus: Apomys
- Species: A. brownorum

Binomial name
- Apomys brownorum Heaney, Balete, Alviola, Duya, Veluz, VandeVrede & Steppan, 2011
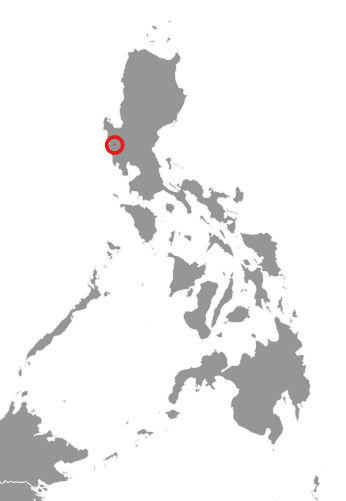

Mammal found in the Philippines

The Mount Tapulao forest mouse (Apomys brownorum) is a forest mouse endemic to the Mount Tapulao area in the Philippines. It is named after the American zoologist Barbara Elaine Russell Brown. and her husband Roger Brown.

== Anatomy and physiology ==
The mouse is the smallest species in its genus, measuring in total "230-255 mm; tail: 107-116 mm; hind foot: 31-35 mm; ear: 21 - 22 mm" and weighing 60-84 grams. On its dorsal side, the mouse has long, dense, soft, dark brown fur, with dark gray ventral fur turning a lighter gray-brown at the tips. Its tail is bicolored, "dark grayish-brown dorsally and nearly white ventrally."

== Ecology ==
The Mount Tapulaou forest mouse lives in old growth cloud forests and regenerating secondary forests at a height of 2024 m, with a lower limit somewhere between 1690 m and 2024 m. It is unknown how extensive chromium mining of the habitat affects the species.

== Behavior ==
The mouse eats seeds and invertebrates such as earthworms. It is nocturnal.
