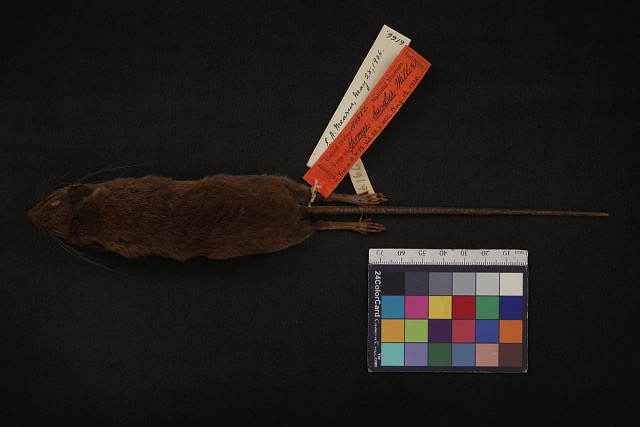
- A specimen of Apomys insignis

Conservation status
- Least Concern (IUCN 3.1)

Scientific classification
- Kingdom: Animalia
- Phylum: Chordata
- Class: Mammalia
- Order: Rodentia
- Family: Muridae
- Genus: Apomys
- Species: A. insignis

Binomial name
- Apomys insignis Mearns, 1905
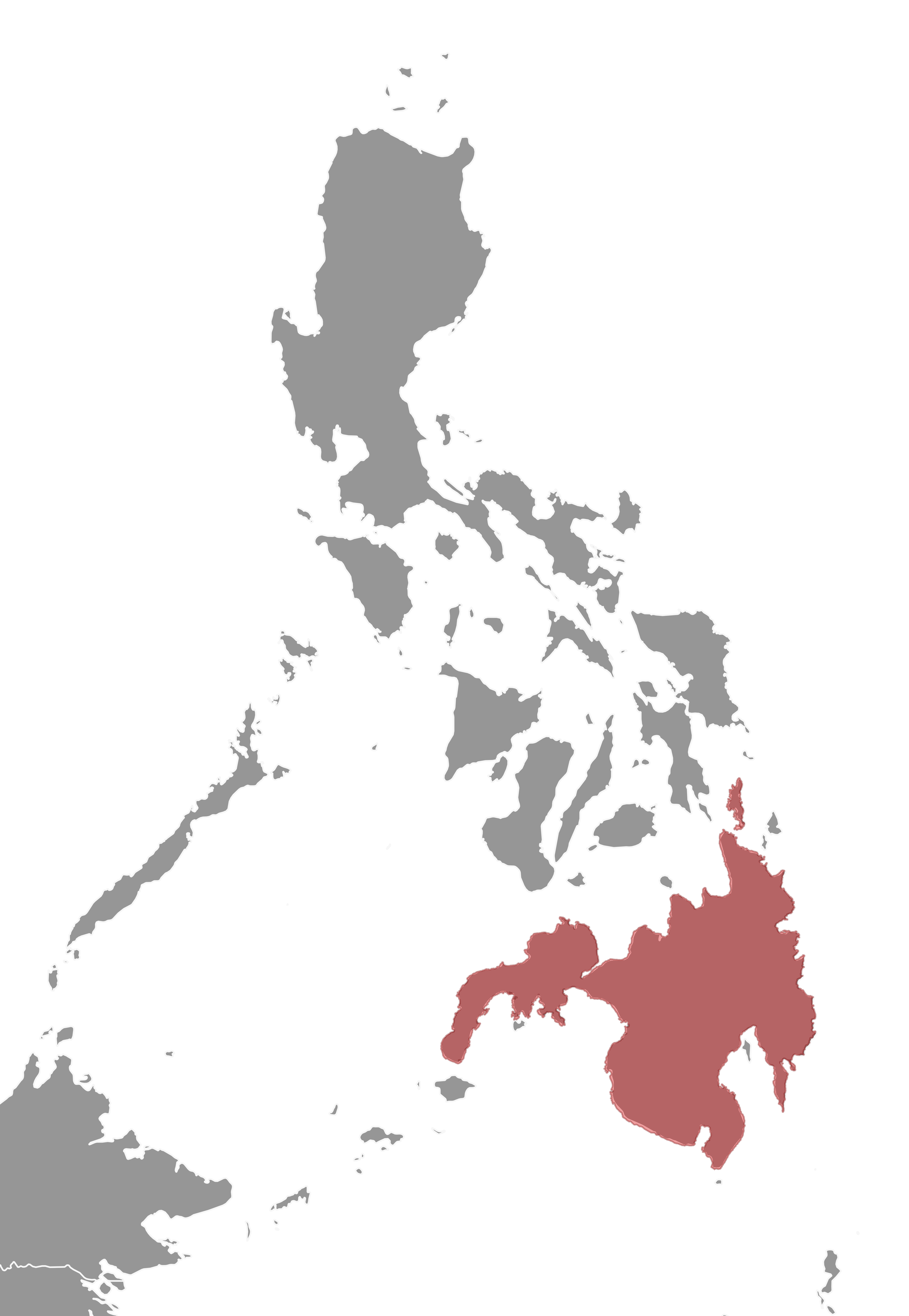

= Mindanao montane forest mouse =

Species of rodent

The Mindanao montane forest mouse (Apomys insignis) is a species of rodent in the family Muridae. It is found only in the Philippines.
