= Luzon Aurora forest mouse =

Scientific classification
- Kingdom: Animalia
- Phylum: Chordata
- Class: Mammalia
- Order: Rodentia
- Family: Muridae
- Genus: Apomys
- Species: A. aurorae

Binomial name
- Apomys aurorae Heaney, Balete, Alviola, Duya, Veluz, VandeVrede & Steppan, 2011
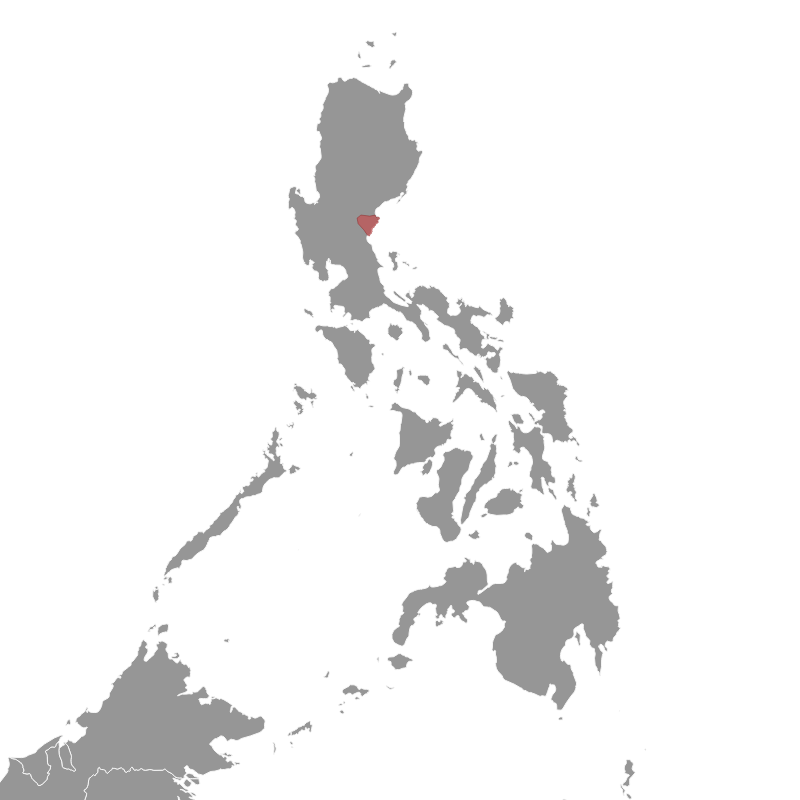

Mammal found in the Philippines

The Aurora forest mouse (Apomys aurorae) is a small murine endemic to Mt. Mingan in Luzon, Philippines.

== Status ==
Apomys aurorae is associated with montane and mossy forest in the Mingan Mountains, habitats that are not currently under threat.
