= Tawitawi forest rat =

Conservation status
- Data Deficient (IUCN 3.1)

Scientific classification
- Kingdom: Animalia
- Phylum: Chordata
- Class: Mammalia
- Order: Rodentia
- Family: Muridae
- Genus: Rattus
- Species: R. tawitawiensis

Binomial name
- Rattus tawitawiensis Musser & Heaney, 1985
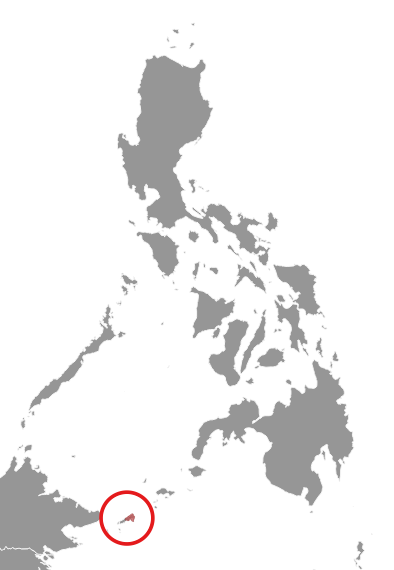

Species of rodent

The Tawitawi forest rat or Tawitawi Island rat (Rattus tawitawiensis) is a species of rodent in the family Muridae. It is found only in Tawi-Tawi, Philippines.
