= Luzon giant forest mouse =

Scientific classification
- Kingdom: Animalia
- Phylum: Chordata
- Class: Mammalia
- Order: Rodentia
- Family: Muridae
- Genus: Apomys
- Species: A. magnus

Binomial name
- Apomys magnus Heaney, Balete, Alviola, Duya, Veluz, VandeVrede & Steppan, 2011
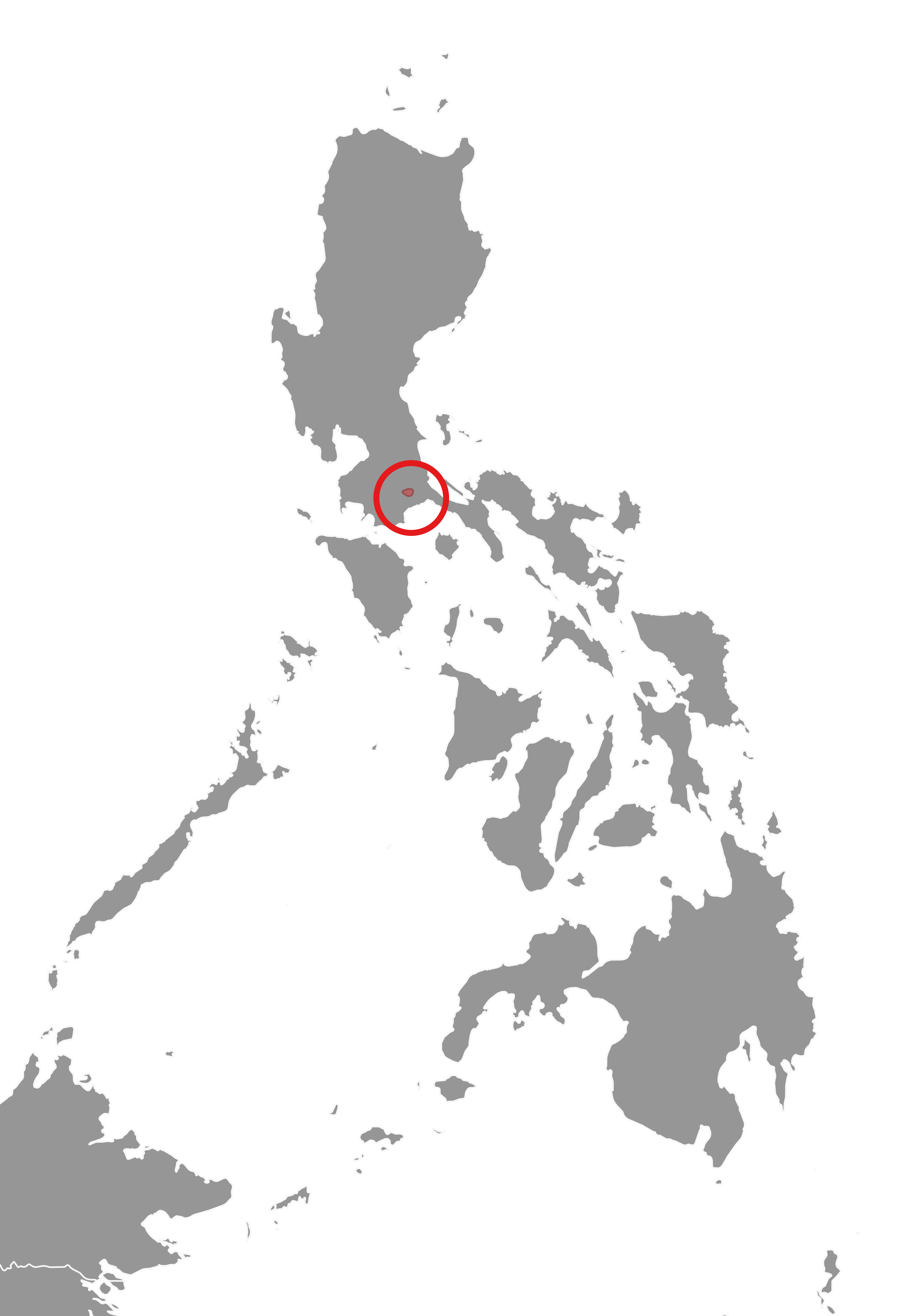

Mammal found in the Philippines

The Luzon giant forest mouse (Apomys magnus) is a forest mouse endemic to Luzon, Philippines.
