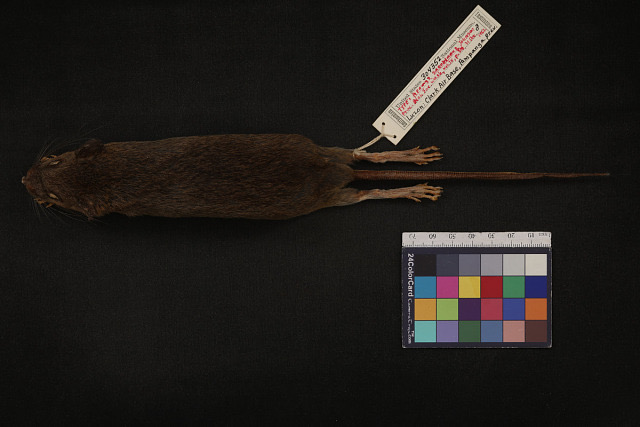
- A specimen of Apomys sacobianus

Conservation status
- Least Concern (IUCN 3.1)]

Scientific classification
- Kingdom: Animalia
- Phylum: Chordata
- Class: Mammalia
- Order: Rodentia
- Family: Muridae
- Genus: Apomys
- Species: A. sacobianus

Binomial name
- Apomys sacobianus Johnson, 1962
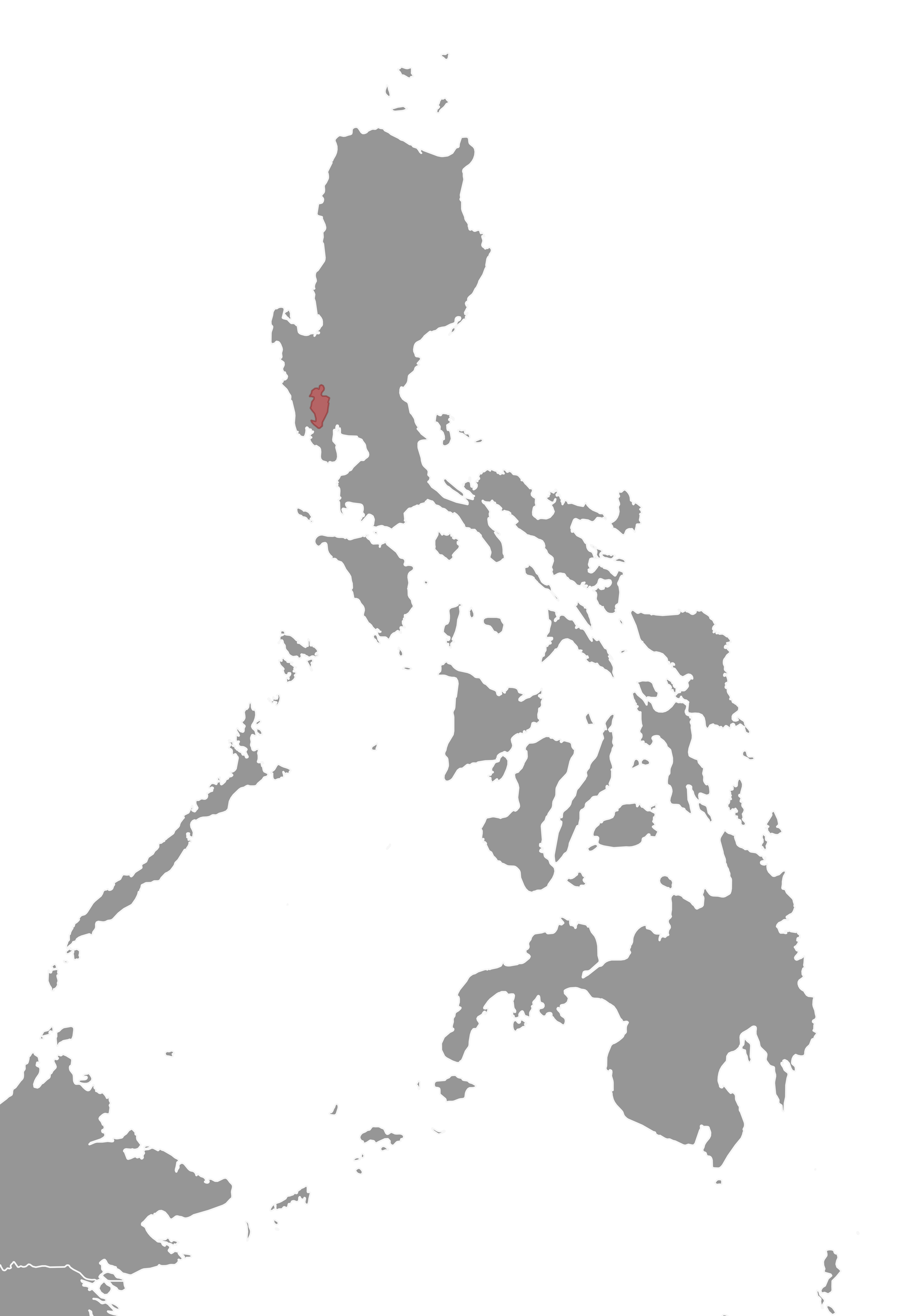

= Long-nosed Luzon forest mouse =

Species of rodent

The long-nosed Luzon forest mouse (Apomys sacobianus), also known as the Pinatubo volcano mouse, is a species of rodent in the family Muridae.

== Distribution and habitat ==
It is endemic to Mount Pinatubo. Its natural habitat is subtropical or tropical dry forests. It is threatened by habitat loss.

== Rediscovery ==
Known only from a single type specimen in a museum collection, a 2021 paper revealed field surveys in 2011 and 2012 that found it to be common in its habitat.
