= Colin Campbell Sanborn =

US ecologist and biologist

Colin Campbell Sanborn (1897–1962) was a US ecologist and biologist, employed as curator of birds and mammals at the Field Museum of Natural History in Chicago. His works include taxonomic revisions of the Chiroptera bat families, and he was recognised in the specific epithet of the broad-nosed bat Scotorepens sanborni.

In 1950, Sanborn received a request from the infamous murderer Nathan Leopold, asking for photo of the Kirtland's warblers that Leopold had donated to the museum as a young birder, years before his crime; Sanborn had to tell the Joliet prison inmate that the specimens had never been exhibited or photographed.
