= Danilo S. Balete =

Filipino zoologist and biologist

Danilo S. Balete (1960 in the Bicol Region of the Philippines – July 1, 2017), also known as Danny Balete, was a Filipino zoologist and biologist. He is known for his work on the Philippines' endemic mammal species. He pursued the question of what determines species diversity. The research by Balete and his team overturned previously held notions that diversity decreased in mountainous regions, showing that harsh environments could generate, rather than suppress, species diversity.

His research also included non-mammals and plants. He is credited for the discovery of several species of Rafflesia.

== Early life and education ==
Balete grew up in the Bicol Region of Luzon. He grew up on a small farm where he learned to ride carabaos and catch fish by hand.

From 1984 to 1988 he studied at the University of the Philippines in Los Baños, where he obtained the Bachelor of Science in Zoology. In 1989 he became a member of the Philippine Mammal Project of the Field Museum of Natural History. He spent eight months of the year as an expedition leader in the rainforest and about four months with a research team from the Field Museum of Natural History.

From 1992, he completed a biology degree at the University of Illinois at Chicago (UIC) at the invitation of Lawrence R. Heaney, where he graduated in 1995 with a Master of Science.

== Career ==
In 2000, Balete began a 15-year long-term study of the mammals of the island of Luzon. The project team, made up of Filipino and US scientists, included Balete, Lawrence R. Heaney of the Field Museum of Natural History, Mariano Roy Duya and Melizar Duya of the University of the Philippines, Sharon Jansa of the University of Minnesota, Eric Rickart of the Natural History Museum of Utah and Scott Steppan of Florida State University. Of 56 non-flying mammal species, 52 are endemic to Luzon and 28 mammal species were rediscovered during this study. Also 57 species of bats occur on Luzon. In 2008, Balete and Heaney on Pulagon, Luzon, made the rediscovery of the blacktail Luzon tree rat (Carpomys melanurus), a rodent that had been considered lost for 112 years. In 2016, he published with Lawrence R. Heaney and Eric A. Rickart a book on the mammals of Luzon entitled The Mammals of Luzon Island: Biogeography and Natural History of a Philippine Fauna.

From 2002 to 2013 Balete was a research associate at the Field Museum of Natural History in Chicago. From 2003 to 2013 he was a research assistant at the National Museum of the Philippines.

From 2008 to 2009, Balete was a lecturer at the University of the Philippines, Diliman in Quezon City.

Balete was a member of the Haribon Foundation, the largest conservation organization in the Philippines.

== Species described ==
Besides several rodent species, including Archboldomys musseri, Crunomys suncoides, Apomys aurorae, Apomys banahao, Apomys brownorum, Apomys iridensis, Apomys magnus, Apomys minganensis, Apomys lubangensis, Apomys sierrae, Apomys zambalensis, Batomys uragon, Rhynchomys banahao, Rhynchomys isarogensis, Rhynchomys labo and Rhynchomys mingan, Balete described the four lizard species Brachymeles lukbani, Parvoscincus boyingi, Parvoscincus hadros and Parvoscincus igorotorum. Balete's research also focuses on indigenous members of the Rafflesia plant genus.

== Honors ==
In 2006, Julie F. Barcelona, Mary Ann O. Cajano and Annalee S. Hadsall described the Rafflesia species Rafflesia baletei, which was discovered in 1991 by Balete on the Isarog volcano in the Bicol Region.

== Citations ==
The standard author abbreviation Balete is used to indicate this person as the author when citing a botanical name.
