= Eric A. Rickart =

American mammalogist

- Born: Eric Allan Rickart; February 7, 1950 (age 76); New Haven, Connecticut, U.S.
- Education: University of Kansas (BS, MA); University of Utah (PhD)
- Known for: Research on mammalian diversity and biogeography in the Philippines and the Great Basin
- Scientific career
- Fields: Mammalogy, biogeography, ecology
- Workplaces: Natural History Museum of Utah; University of Utah; Field Museum of Natural History

Eric Allan Rickart (born February 7, 1950) is an American mammalogist and museum curator whose research focuses on mammalian diversity, biogeography, ecology, and evolution. He is the curator of vertebrate zoology at the Natural History Museum of Utah.

== Biography ==
=== Education and career ===
Rickart received a Bachelor of Science degree in 1974 and a Master of Arts degree in 1976 from the University of Kansas. He earned a PhD in biology from the University of Utah in 1982. From 1984 to 1985, he worked as a collections manager and visiting lecturer in the Department of Biology at the University of Texas at El Paso. From 1985 to 1991, he served as curator of birds and mammals at the Natural History Museum of Utah. In 1990, he became an associate professor in the University of Utah's Department of Biology and a research associate in the mammal department of the Field Museum of Natural History in Chicago. Since 1991, he has served as curator of vertebrate zoology at the Natural History Museum of Utah.

Rickart's research investigates the origins and conservation of biological diversity at both regional and global scales. His work encompasses historical biogeography, community ecology, and the evolution of mammals in island systems, where geographic isolation provides opportunities to study the development of species diversity.

In collaboration with Lawrence R. Heaney and Danilo S. Balete of the Field Museum of Natural History, Rickart studied mammalian endemism in the Philippines, particularly on the island of Luzon. Their expeditions into previously unexplored regions contributed to the discovery and description of several mammal species. Their research was presented in the 2016 book The Mammals of Luzon Island: Biogeography and Natural History of a Philippine Fauna. Their findings have also contributed to scientific understanding relevant to the conservation of Philippine biodiversity and the protection of its endemic species.

Rickart has also worked with Rebecca Rowe on a research project investigating the mammals of the Great Basin. The project combines historical records from museum collections with contemporary field surveys to document changes in mammalian fauna during the 20th century and examine the relative effects of climate change and human land use. He has presented his findings at national scientific conferences and published more than 60 peer-reviewed articles in scientific journals.

Rickart is a member of several professional organisations, including the Society for Conservation Biology, the Southwestern Association of Naturalists, and the American Society of Mammalogists. He is a former editor of the Journal of Mammalogy and has served as a co-editor of the journal Mammalian Species.

== Selected bibliography ==
- Heaney, Lawrence R., and Rickart, Eric A., et al. (2016). The Mammals of Luzon Island: Biogeography and Natural History of a Philippine Fauna. Johns Hopkins University Press.
