= Lawrence R. Heaney =

American zoologist (born 1952)

Lawrence Richard Heaney (born December 2, 1952, in Washington, DC ) is an American mammalogist, ecologist and biogeographer. His research focus is the mammals of the Philippines.

== Career ==
From June 1967 to June 1971, Heaney was a helper and museum technician at the Department of Mammals at the Smithsonian Institution. From June 1971 to September 1971, Heaney worked as a collector for the Delaware Museum of Natural History. From June 1972 to June 1975 he was a curator and research associate at the University of Minnesota. From June 1973 to August 1975 he was field and research assistant at the Smithsonian Institution. In June 1975, Heaney earned his Bachelor of Science degree from the University of Minnesota. From August 1975 to May 1979 he was curatorial assistant, teaching and research assistant at the University of Kansas. In May 1978, he was awarded a Master of Arts degree from the University of Kansas and, in October 1979, his Ph.D. From September 1979 to August 1986, he was assistant professor at the department of biology and assistant curator at the department of mammals at the Museum of Zoology, University of Michigan. From 1986 to 1988 he was a research fellow and since 1988 he has been a research associate at the Smithsonian Institution. Since 1991 he has been a research assistant at the American Museum of Natural History. From 1988 he was curator and since 2002 he has been head of the mammalogical department of the Field Museum of Natural History in Chicago, Illinois.

In 2008, Heaney and his colleague Danilo S. Balete rediscovered the Blacktail Luzon Tree Rat (Pulomys melanurus) on the Pulag on Luzon, a rodent that had been considered lost for 112 years.

== Species described ==
Mammals described by Heaney include, among others, the Tawi-Tawi forest rat (Rattus tawitawiensis), the Palawan Montane squirrel (Sundasciurus rabori), the Dinagat bushy-tailed cloud rat (Crateromys australis), the Dinagat Gymnure (Podogymnura aureospinula) and nine species of Apomys: Apomys aurorae, Apomys banahao, Apomys brownorum, Apomys iridensis, Apomys magnus, Apomys minganensis, Apomys camiguinensis, Apomys lubangensis and Apomys sierrae.

== Names named after Heaney ==
In 1996, Pedro C. Gonzales and Robert S. Kennedy named the Panay Bark Rat (Crateromys heaneyi) in his honor. In 1997, Colin Groves honored Heaney in naming the subspecies Prionailurus bengalensis heaneyi, the Bengal cat from the Philippine island of Palawan.

== Selected publications ==
- 1982 Mammals of Dinagat and Siargao islands, Philippines
- 1983 Relationships of pocket gophers of the genome Geomys from the Central and Northern Great Plains
- 1985 Systematics of Oriental pygmy squirrels of the genera Exilisciurus and Nannosciurus (Mammalia, Sciuridae)
- 1986 Island biogeography of mammals
- 1998 Vanishing treasures of the Philippine rainforest
- 2004 Frontiers of biogeography: new directions in the geography of nature
- 2006 The mammals and birds of Camiguin Island, Philippines, a Distinctive Center of Biodiversity
- 2011 Discovering diversity: studies of the mammals of Luzon Island, Philippines
- 2016 The Mammals of Luzon Island. Biogeography and Natural History of a Philippine Fauna
