= List of living mammal species described in the 2020s: 2025–2029 =

== List of species ==
Legend to the BGR column

AF Afrotropical AN Antarctic AU Australasian IM Indomalayan NA Nearctic NT Neotropical OC Oceanian PA Palearctic

publ-date (Note: The date of the first publication of the scientific source in which the species/subspecies was first described. In accordance with ISO 8601 and MOS:DATEFORMAT, all dates are recorded in "yyyy-mm-dd" format. The odd and even years highlighted by different colors.)	Order	Family	Scientific name (Note: In this column, the species highlighted by yellow (#F9F5B0) and the subspecies stay unhighlighted. The links to the enwiki articles are supplied with the interwiki links to the appropriate Wikidata items (displayed as superscript "[wd]" after each name), they will be especially useful if some articles are absent and you've decided to create them.)	Common name (Note: The rules for using of capital letters in common names are stated in MOS:LIFE.)	morph-pict (Note: This column contains morphological pictograms which roughly illustrate the appearance of the listed taxa. The main Wikicommons category where such images are stacked is Realistic silhouettes of mammals.)	BGR	Coordinates (Note: The geographic coordinates of the place where the holotype was collected.)	Location (Note: Description of the location where the holotype was collected. Some absent geographic articles that exist in any other language suppled with the interwiki links to the appropriate Wikidata items (superscript "[wd]"). You can help to improve Wikipedia by creating their English conterparts.)	coll-date (Note: The date on which the holotype was collected.)	Wikispp (Note: Since the Wikispecies "id" corresponds to the taxon's sci-name, which listed in the appropriate column, the links in this column shall not be named to play the role of a row counter in the table.)	NCBI ID	MDD ID	
2025-01-03	Rodentia	Erethizontidae	Coendou vossi	Voss's porcupine		NT	5°31′30″N 75°02′30″W	Tropical montane moist forest (1580 m a.s.l.) at the Selva de Florencia National Natural Park, near the town of Florencia, Samaná Municipality, Caldas Department, C Colombia.	2021-03-13	sp.		1006907	
2025-01-24	Lagomorpha	Leporidae	Sylvilagus cunicularius leptocephalus	Mexican cottontail (leptocephalus)		NT	22°22′N 105°32′W	Tropical lowland seasonally dry woodland (~1 m a.s.l.) alongside the local road, ~1 km N of the town of Quimichis, Tecuala Municipality, Nayarit, W Mexico.		ssp.		1001128	
2025-02-12	Eulipotyphla	Talpidae	Uropsilus funiushanensis	Funiushan shrew mole		PA	34°30′28″N 111°05′44″E	Temperate montane mixed forest (~889 m a.s.l.), located ~12 km SE of the town of Yangdian, Lingbao City, Sanmenxia Prefecture, Henan Province, C China.	2022-07	sp.		1006930	
2025-02-25	Chiroptera	Hipposideridae	Hipposideros srilankaensis	Sri Lankan roundleaf bat		IM	6°50′22″N 81°02′56″E	Tropical montane moist forest (~1100 m a.s.l.), located 1.5 km NE of the town of Makulella (Bandarawela), Badulla District, Uva Province, S Sri Lanka.	2018-05-06	sp.		1006932	
2025-03-10	Rodentia	Zapodidae	Eozapus wanglangensis	Wanglang jumping mouse		PA	33°00′25″N 104°01′20″E	Temperate montane conifer forest (~2931 m a.s.l.) in the E part of the Tibetan Plateau at the Wanglang National Nature Reserve, Pingwu County, Mianyang Prefecture, Sichuan Province, C China.	2019-09	sp.		1006921	
2025-03-15	Eulipotyphla	Talpidae	Scaptonyx wangi	Wang's long-tailed mole		IM	27°48′22″N 98°27′32″E	Subtropical montane closed conifer forest (~3092 m a.s.l.) outside the E entrance of the Dulongjiang Tunnel on the road from Gongshan County to the town of Dulongjiang, Gongshan County, Nujiang Prefecture, Yunnan Province, C China.		sp.		1006929	
2025-03-27	Chiroptera	Vespertilionidae	Myotis guarani	Guaraní myotis		NT	16°56′41″S 56°37′57″W	Tropical lowland flooded savanna (~117 m a.s.l.) at Fazenda São João on the left bank of the Cuiabá River, close to the NE boundary of the Encontro das Águas State Park, Poconé Municipality, Mato Grosso, W Brazil.		sp.		1006935	
2025-05-07	Rodentia	Sminthidae	Breviforamen shannanense	Short-foramen birch mouse		PA	28°42′04″N 93°10′41″E	Temperate montane mixed forest (~3900 m a.s.l.) on the left bank of the Tsari Chu River in the E part of the Himalayas, ~19 NWW of the town of Zhari, Lhünzê County, Shannan Prefecture, TAR, SW China.	2023-09-23	sp.		1006975	
2025-05-07	Eulipotyphla	Soricidae	Cryptotis albujai	Albuja's short-tailed shrew		NT	4°29′29″S 79°07′35″W	Tropical montane cloud forest (~2541 m a.s.l.) at the Tapichalaca Private Reserve, ~7 km N of the settlement of Valladolid, Palanda Canton, Zamora-Chinchipe Province, SE Ecuador.	2007-06-07	sp.	3680204	1006936	
2025-05-07	Rodentia	Sminthidae	Sicista brevicauda	Short-tailed birch mouse		PA	43°08′56″N 82°53′53″E	Temperate montane conifer forest (~1750 m a.s.l.) in the N part of the Tian Shan Mts., Kuerdening Nature Reserve, ~20 km SE of the town of Kuerdening (Mohuer), Gongliu County, Ili Kazakh Autonomous Prefecture, XUAR, NW China.	2021-06-24	sp.		1006976	
2025-05-08	Rodentia	Muridae	Mus musculus gyirongus	House mouse (gyirongus)		IM	28°24′07″N 85°19′30″E	Subtropical montane mixed forest (~2836 m a.s.l.) in the CE part of the Himalayas, near the town of Gyirong, Gyirong County, Shigatse Prefecture, TAR, SW China.	2023-05-24	ssp.		1003372	
2025-05-12	Eulipotyphla	Soricidae	Cryptotis parvus neomexicanus	North American least shrew (neomexicanus)		NA	33°27′39″N 104°24′07″W	Ciénega wetland surrounded by the temperate upland semi-arid grassland (~1000 m a.s.l.) at the Bitter Lake National Wildlife Refuge, ~10 km NE of the town of Roswell, Chaves County, New Mexico, SW USA.	1986-09-27	ssp.		1004165	
2025-05-28	Chiroptera	Vespertilionidae	Murina chayuensis	Chayu tube-nosed bat		PA	28°29′51″N 97°00′54″E	Temperate montane mixed conifer-broadleaf forest edge (~1511 m a.s.l.) on the right bank of the Gongrigabu Qu River, near the agricultural area and the town of Xiachayu, Chayu County, Nyingchi Prefecture, TAR, SW China.	2023-08-17	sp.		1006942	
2025-05-28	Rodentia	Cricetidae	Neodon konggordous	Konggordo mountain vole		PA	27°55′25″N 91°50′18″E	Subtropical montane shrubland (~3870 m a.s.l.) in the W part of Kanggardo Mts., Cuona County, Shannan Prefecture, TAR, SW China.	2023-08-19	sp.		1006939	
2025-05-28	Rodentia	Cricetidae	Neodon kulakangria	Kulagangri mountain vole		IM	28°04′52″N 91°01′48″E	Subtropical montane mixed conifer-broadleaf forest (~3200 m a.s.l.) in the E part of the Kula Kangri Mountains, near the settlement of Lajiao, Luozha County, Shannan Prefecture, TAR, SW China.	2023-08-23	sp.		1006940	
2025-05-28	Rodentia	Cricetidae	Neodon minor	Lesser mountain vole		PA	30°50′11″N 102°42′34″E	Temperate montane conifer forest edge (~3460 m a.s.l.) in the Jiajin Mts., Baoxing County, Ya'an Prefecture Sichuan Province, C China.	2009-09-02	sp.		1006941	
2025-05-31	Chiroptera	Vespertilionidae	Plecotus auritus ponticus	Brown long-eared bat (ponticus)		PA	44°43′00″N 37°27′09″E	Temperate broadleaf forest on the NE coast of the Black Sea, near the settlement of Malyi Utrish, Anapa District, Krasnodar Region, SW Russia.	2018-06-03	ssp.		1005669	
2025-06-02	Chiroptera	Vespertilionidae	Murina beibengensis	Beibeng tube-nosed bat		IM	29°13′59″N 95°09′00″E	Temperate montane mixed broadleaf forest (~864 m a.s.l.) on the left bank of the Yalu Zangbu River, ~2 km SW of the town of Beibeng, Medog County, Nyingchi Prefecture, TAR, SW China.	2024-08-15	sp.		1006943	
2025-06-02	Chiroptera	Vespertilionidae	Murina medogensis	Medog tube-nosed mat		IM	29°17′55″N 95°17′16″E	Temperate montane mixed broadleaf forest (~813 m a.s.l.) on the left bank of the Yalu Zangbu River, ~12 km NE of the town of Beibeng, Medog County, Nyingchi Prefecture, TAR, SW China.	2024-08-16	sp.		1006944	
2025-06-02	Chiroptera	Vespertilionidae	Murina milinensis	Milin tube-nosed bat		PA	29°09′36″N 94°12′26″E	Temperate montane mixed broadleaf-conifer forest edge (~3020 m a.s.l.) near the agricultural area on the right bank of the Yalu Zangbu River, ~2 km S of the town of Naiyü Lhoba, Mainling County, TAR, SW China.	2023-08-14	sp.		1006945	
2025-06-02	Chiroptera	Vespertilionidae	Murina yadongensis	Yadong tube-nosed bat		IM	27°21′51″N 88°58′34″E	Subtropical montane evergreen conifer forest (~2775 m a.s.l.) at the locality of Boluoka (close to the boundary of the Torsa Strict Nature Reserve), ~8 km SE of the town of Xiayadong, Yadong County, Shigatse Prefecture, TAR, SW China.	2023-08-06	sp.		1006947	
2025-06-05	Chiroptera	Vespertilionidae	Myotis himalaicus	Himalayan long-tailed myotis		IM	30°29′16″N 79°17′29″E	Temperate montane moist evergreen broadleaf forest (~2000 m a.s.l.) at the locality of Ansuya, ~8 km N of the town of Gopeshwar, Chamoli District, Uttarakhand State, N India.	2021-05	sp.		1006948	
2025-06-09	Rodentia	Cricetidae	Incanomys mayopuma	Incan water rat		NT	13°11′09″S 72°32′34″W	Tropical montane moist forest (~2825 m a.s.l.) on the E slopes of the Peruvian Andes, near the riun of Wiñay Wayna in the Historic Sanctuary of Machu Picchu, ~4 SW of the town of Aguas Calientes, Urubamba Province, Cusco Department, S Peru.	2012-10-24	sp.		1006956	
2025-06-12	Rodentia	Muridae	Apomys crinitus	Fringe-eared Mindoro forest mouse		IM	12°41′57″N 121°03′39″E	Disturbed tropical upland moist evergreen broadleaf forest patch (~700 m a.s.l.) on the right bank of the Lumintao River in the SW part of the island of Mindoro, Mounts Iglit–Baco Natural Park, Sablayan Municipality, Occidental Mindoro Province, W Philippines.	2014-03-03	sp.		1006950	
2025-06-12	Rodentia	Muridae	Apomys minor	Small Mindoro forest mouse		IM	12°44′28″N 121°11′54″E	Disturbed tropical montane moist evergreen broadleaf forest edge (~1280 m a.s.l.) on the W slope of the Mt. Wood in the S part of the island of Mindoro, Mounts Iglit–Baco Natural Park, Rizal Municipality, Occidental Mindoro Province, W Philippines.	2015-02-03	sp.		1006951	
2025-06-12	Rodentia	Muridae	Apomys veluzi	Veluz's Mindoro forest mouse		IM	13°24′31″N 120°37′08″E	Disturbed tropical montane moist evergreen broadleaf forest (~710 m a.s.l.) on the E slope of the Mt. Abra de Ilog in the NW part of the island of Mindoro, Abra de Ilog Municipality, Occidental Mindoro Province, W Philippines.	2014-02-07	sp.		1006952	
2025-06-13	Rodentia	Muridae	Crunomys tompotika	Tompotika spiny rat		AU	0°39′00″S 123°07′43″E	Tropical lowland moist evergreen forest (~350 m a.s.l.) on the N foot of the Mt. Tompotika in the NE part of the island of Sulawesi, ~8 km SE of the coastal village of Sampaka, Bualemo District, Banggai Regency, Central Sulawesi Province, C Indonesia.	2011-04-11	sp.		1006959	
2025-06-13	Chiroptera	Vespertilionidae	Pipistrellus etula	Bioko pipistrelle		AF	3°21′20″N 8°37′16″E	Tropical montane moist evergreen broadleaf forest (~1826 m a.s.l.) on the SW shore of the crater lake on the summit of the Mt. Biao in the S part of the island of Bioko, ~4 km W of the settlement of Moca, Bioko Sur Province, NE Equatorial Guinea.	1989-04-14	sp.		1006963	
2025-06-18	Eulipotyphla	Soricidae	Nagasorex albidens	Nagaland shrew		IM	25°35′06″N 94°07′45″E	Subtropical montane moist mixed forest (~1600 m a.s.l.) on the Naga Hills, near the settlement of Jakhama, Kohima District, Nagaland State, NER, NE India.	1950-08-20	sp.		1006961	
2025-06-18	Eulipotyphla	Soricidae	Sorex nivicola	Gansu striped shrew		PA	34°04′44″N 102°38′02″E	Temperate montane conifer forest patch (~3500 m a.s.l.) surrounded by alpine grasslands and located in the NE part of the Tibetan Plateau, near the town of Langmusi, Luqu County, Gannan Prefecture, Gansu Province, C China.		sp.		1006962	
2025-06-19	Didelphimorphia	Didelphidae	Marmosa chachapoya	Chachapoya mouse opossum		NT	7°40′S 77°26′W	Tropical montane moist broadleaf forest in the upper Montecristo River basin, near the La Playa archeological site in the Rio Abiseo National Park, Mariscal Cáceres Province, San Martín Department, N Peru.	2018-08-16	sp.		1006953	
2025-06-19	Rodentia	Cricetidae	Oecomys hiceae	Hice's arboreal rice rat		NT	3°58′00″S 73°25′00″W	Tropical lowland moist broadleaf forest (~110 m a.s.l.) in the upper Amazon River basin, Allpahuayo-Mishana National Reserve, ~28 km SW of Iquitos, Maynas Province, Loreto Department, NE Peru.	1997-12-28	sp.		1006957	
2025-06-20	Rodentia	Gliridae	Dryomys anatolicus	East Anatolian forest dormouse		PA	39°25′15″N 39°14′26″E	Temperate montane xeric shrubland (~1800 m a.s.l.) on the Eşekçayırı plateau in the Munzur Mts., ~7 km NE of the town of Ovacık, Ovacık District, Tunceli Province, E Turkey.		sp.		1006990	
2025-06-26	Dasyuromorphia	Dasyuridae	Antechinomys auritus	Long-eared kultarr		AU	26°07′00″S 126°35′00″E	Subtropical upland xeric shrubland (~460 m a.s.l.) on the bank of the Elder Creek, ~1.5 km N of the town of Warburton, Goldfields–Esperance Region, Western Australia, CW Australia.	1963-08	sp.		1006954	
2025-07-01	Rodentia	Muridae	Rattus radityaniae	Radityani's rat		IM	0°18′07″S 115°50′04″E	Tropical lowland moist forest (~50 m a.s.l.) on the left bank of the lower Mahakam River in the E part of the island of Borneo, near the village of Empakuq, Melak District, West Kutai Regency, East Kalimantan, С Indonesia.	2006-05-22	sp.		1006960	
2025-07-08	Chiroptera	Vespertilionidae	Myotis huariorum	Huariorum myotis		NT	15°56′S 73°08′W	Disturbed montane semi-arid grassland (~480 m a.s.l.) on the left bank of the Ocoña River, Hacienda Alto Molino, Río Grande District, Condesuyos Province, Arequipa Department, S Peru.		sp.	2974270	1006974	
2025-07-14	Rodentia	Sminthidae	Sicista meiguites	Meigu birch mouse		PA	28°36′42″N 102°56′30″E	Temperate montane mixed forest (~2939 m a.s.l.) in the Hengduan Mountains, Dafengding Nature Reserve, ~20 km N of the town of Houbonaituo, Meigu County, Liangshan Prefecture, Sichuan Province, S China.	2019-06	sp.		1006971	
2025-08-06	Lagomorpha	Ochotonidae	Ochotona galunglaensis	Galongla pika		PA	29°08′17″N 95°14′36″E	Temperate montane mixed forest in the SW part of the Galongla Mts., ~21 SW of the town of Mêdog, Mêdog County, TAR, SW China.	2024-06-03	sp.		1006978	
2025-08-06	Lagomorpha	Ochotonidae	Ochotona legbona	Legbo pika		PA	27°53′55″N 91°48′01″E	Subtropical montane mixed forest in the Lebu (Lengbo) Valley, ~18 km SE of the town of Tsona, Tsona County, Shannan Prefecture, SW China.	2024-04-10	sp.		1006979	
2025-08-20	Eulipotyphla	Soricidae	Crocidura stanleyi	Stanley's white-toothed shrew		AF	13°15′34″N 38°11′29″E	Tropical montane seasonal evergreen woodland (~3597 m a.s.l.) domintated by Lobelia rhynchopetalum and located near the Chennek Camp in the Simien Mountains National Park, ~32 km NE of the town of Debark, North Gondar Zone, Amhara Regional State, NW Ethiopia.	2015-09-27	sp.		1006980"	
2025-09-08	Chiroptera	Vespertilionidae	Murina alvarezi	Alvarez's tube-nosed bat		IM	9°43′14″N 123°27′34″E	Tropical upland moist evergreen forest (~763 m a.s.l.) in the S part of the island of Cebu, near the sitio of Bulalacao, ~3 km E of the center of the barangay of Nug-as, Alcoy Municipality, Cebu Province, C Philippines.	2009-08-07	sp.	3477261	1006981	
2025-09-08	Chiroptera	Vespertilionidae	Murina baletei	Balete's tube-nosed bat		IM	14°46′44″N 121°19′05″E	Tropical upland moist evergreen forest (~775 m a.s.l.) in the S part of the island of Luzon, ~1.5 km SW of the Mt. Irid peak, ~15 km NEE of the city of Rodriguez, Rizal Province, N Philippines.	2009-06-08	sp.	3477262	1006982	
2025-09-08	Chiroptera	Vespertilionidae	Murina hilonghilong	Hilong-hilong tube-nosed bat		IM	9°24′28″N 125°52′34″E	Tropical lowland moist evergreen forest (~85 m a.s.l.) domintated by Xanthostemon verdugonianus and located on the foot of the Hilong-Hilong Range in the NE part of the island of Mindanao, barangay of Adlay, Carrascal Municipality, Surigao del Sur Province, N Philippines.	2006-07-30	sp.	3477263	1006983	
2025-09-08	Chiroptera	Vespertilionidae	Murina luzonensis	Luzon tube-nosed bat		IM	15°27′32″N 121°22′16″E	Tropical upland moist evergreen forest (~559 m a.s.l.) domintated by Dipterocarpaceae spp. and located in the CE part of the island of Luzon, ~4 km of the Mt. Mingan peak, Dingalan Municipality, Aurora Province, N Philippines.	2006-06-24	sp.	3477264	1006984	
2025-09-08	Chiroptera	Vespertilionidae	Murina mindorensis	Mindoro tube-nosed bat		IM	12°49′36″N 120°56′57″E	Tropical lowland moist forest (~140 m a.s.l.) domintated by Dipterocarpaceae spp. with a dense ground cover of ferns, gingers, orchids, and Begonia spp., located in the C part of the island of Mindoro, ~6 km NW of the Mt. Tallulah peak, Sablayan Municipality, Occidental Mindoro Province, CW Philippines.	2015-04-03	sp.	3477265	1006985	
2025-09-08	Chiroptera	Vespertilionidae	Murina philippinensis	Philippine tube-nosed bat		IM	9°43′14″N 123°27′34″E	Tropical upland moist evergreen forest (~763 m a.s.l.) in the S part of the island of Cebu, near the sitio of Bulalacao, ~3 km E of the center of the barangay of Nug-as, Alcoy Municipality, Cebu Province, C Philippines.	2009-08-05	sp.	3477266	1006986	
2025-09-08	Rodentia	Sciuridae	Petaurista nujiangensis	Nujiang giant flying squirrel		PA	27°42′57″N 98°30′05″E	Temperate montane mixed forest (~2837 m a.s.l.) in the Hengduan Mts., ~16 km W of the town of Cikai, Gongshan County, Nujiang Prefecture, Yunnan Province, SW China.	2016-09-25	sp.		1006991	
2025-09-26	Rodentia	Cricetidae	Daptomys nunashae	Tingo María fish-eating rat		NT	9°24′21″S 76°00′12″W	Tropical montane moist evergreen forest (~1115 m a.s.l.) on the E slopes of the Peruvian Andes, Tingo María National Park, ~10 km S of the town of Tingo María, Mariano Dámaso Beraun District, Leoncio Prado Province, Huánuco Department, C Peru.	2015-12-08	sp.	3477449	1006992	
2025-10-03	Rodentia	Echimyidae	Thrichomys dandreai	D'Andrea's punare		NT	15°11′45″S 55°58′18″W	Tropical lowland seasonal savanna (~300 m a.s.l.) in the basin of the Coxipó-Açu River, foothills of Morro do Cambambe, Chapada dos Guimarães National Park, ~36 km N of the city of Cuiabá, Mato Grosso, CW Brazil.	2010-12-12	sp.		1006989	
2025-10-10	Eulipotyphla	Talpidae	Euroscaptor darwini	Darwin's mole		IM	20°29′01″N 105°06′06″E	Tropical montane moist evergreen forest (~935 m a.s.l.) on the E slope of Pù Luông Range, Pù Luông Nature Reserve, ~1 km W of the settlement of Thành Sơn, Bá Thước District, Thanh Hóa Province, North Central Region, N Vietnam.	2024-11-10	sp.		1006995	
2025-11-07	Chiroptera	Vespertilionidae	Myotis kalkoae	Kalko's myotis		PA	29°16′27″N 107°50′30″E	Shenxian Cave in the karst canyon of the Wu River surrounded by the subtropical upland mixed forest (~300 m a.s.l.), ~5 km NW of the settlement of Jiangkou, Wulong District, Chongqing Municipality, S China.	2008-07	sp.		1006997	
2025-11-12	Rodentia	Spalacidae	Eospalax minshanensis	Minshan zokor		PA	33°00′10″N 104°01′56″E	Temperate montane conifer forest (~2850 m a.s.l.) in the Minshan Mts., Wanglang National Natural Reserve, ~40 km NW of the town of Baima, Pingwu County, Mianyang Prefecture, Sichuan Province, C China.	1998-09-14	sp.		1006998	
2025-11-14	Carnivora	Mustelidae	Mustela mopbie	Hengduan mountain weasel		PA	28°41′45″N 103°21′18″E	Temperate montane mixed forest (~2488 m a.s.l.) on the SE edge of the Tibetan Plateau, Mabian Dafengding Nature Reserve, ~5 km W of the town of Yanfeng, Mabian County, Leshan Prefecture, Sichuan Province, C China.		sp.		1007018	
2025-11-27	Rodentia	Cricetidae	Oreoryzomys huancabambensis	Huancabamba rice rat		NT	5°05′30″S 79°20′41″W	Tropical montane moist broadleaf forest patch (~2130 m a.s.l.) at the locality of Habaspite, ~10 km NE of the settlement of Sapalache, El Carmen de la Frontera District, Huancabamba Province, Piura Department, NW Peru.	2021-10-02	sp.	3470077	1007002	
2025-12-03	Rodentia	Cricetidae	Alticola yarlungius	Yarlung Zangbo mountain vole		PA	28°35′54″N 92°55′39″E	Temperate montane shrubland (~4000 m a.s.l.) in the E part of the Himalayas, ~8 km NE of the town of San'anqulin, Lhünzê County, Shannan Prefecture, TAR, SW China.	2023-08-27	sp.		1006999	
2025-12-04	Eulipotyphla	Soricidae	Soriculus dexingensis	Dexing large-clawed shrew		PA	29°25′04″N 95°03′35″E	Temperate montane mixed forest (~2667 m a.s.l.) in the NE part of the Namcha Barwa Himal range, ~25 km NW of the town of Dexing, Mêdog County, TAR, SW China.	2011-10-29	sp.		1007001	
2025-12-18	Rodentia	Spalacidae	Nannospalax colaki	Çolak's blind mole rat		PA	36°59′54″N 37°49′37″E	Human-modified temperate upland broadleaf woodland (~483 m a.s.l.) near the town of Nizip, Gaziantep Province, S Turkey.		sp.		1007013	
2025-12-18	Rodentia	Spalacidae	Nannospalax garzanensis	Garzan blind mole rat		PA	37°55′00″N 41°44′00″E	Human-modified temperate upland broadleaf woodland (~730 m a.s.l.) near the village of Yeniköprü, Kurtalan District, Siirt Province, SE Turkey.		sp.		1007014	
2025-12-18	Rodentia	Spalacidae	Nannospalax karyominor	Kuseyr blind mole rat		PA	36°01′26″N 36°11′08″E	Temperate upland mixed woodland (~521 m a.s.l.) at the settlement of Çatbaşı, Yayladağı District, Hatay Province, S Turkey.		sp.		1007016	
2026-01-09	Rodentia	Cricetidae	Oreoryzomys jumandi	Jumandi mouse		NT	0°35′58″S 77°53′25″W	Tropical montane moist evergreen broadleaf forest (~2220 m a.s.l.) at the Yanayacu Biological Station, ~3 km SW of the locality of Cosanga, Quijos Canton, Napo Province, C Ecuador.	2024-10-14	sp.		1007029	
2026-02-17	Eulipotyphla	Soricidae	Crocidura pediculus	Little-footed white-toothed shrew		AF	7°56′38″N 9°06′18″W	Tropical moist evergreen broadleaf forest (~500 m a.s.l.), located ~3 NE of the settlement of Zogota, Nzérékoré Region, SE Guinea.	2012-02-02	sp.		1007037	
2026-02-27	Rodentia	Cricetidae	Incanomys parviauris	Small-eared water rat		NT	5°37′51″S 78°15′19″W	Tropical montane moist evergreen broadleaf forest (~2663 m a.s.l.) near Refugio Las Lechuzas in the buffer zone of the Cordillera de Colán National Sanctuary, ~22 km NE of the town of Cajaruro, Cajaruro District, Utcubamba Province, Amazonas Department, N Peru.	2021-05-22	sp.	3799532	1007030	
2026-03-06	Peramelemorphia	Peramelidae	Peroryctes trigonodon	Wablo		AU	4°01′00″S 138°07′00″E	Tropical montane evergreen forest (~2950 m a.s.l.) on the left bank of the upper Baliem River in the W part of the Central Highlands on the island of New Guinea, near the locality of Ubimu, ~10 km W of the Kwiyawagi Aerodrome, Highland Papua Province, E Indonesia.	1994-06-11	sp.		1007033	
2026-03-09	Chiroptera	Vespertilionidae	Afronycteris rautenbachi	Kruger serotine		AF	22°20′48″S 31°06′57″E	Subtropical lowland seasonal woodland (~250 m a.s.l.) characterized by Hyphaene coriacea and located on the right bank of the middle Limpopo River, Makuleka Contract Park in the Kruger National Park, Limpopo Province, NE RSA.	2010-02-03	sp.		1007038	
2026-03-09	Rodentia	Muridae	Praomys togoensis	Togo soft-furred mouse		AF	9°10′29″N 0°53′46″E	Tropical lowland moist forest (~250 m a.s.l.) dominated by Zingiberaceae spp. and located on the left bank of the Kamaka River (upper Mo River basin), Fazao-Malfakassa National Park, ~1 km SW of the village of Binako, Kara Region, C Togo.		sp.		1007032	
2026-04-08	Rodentia	Platacanthomyidae	Typhlomys zhengkuni	Fanjing tree mouse		PA	27°54′44″N 108°40′33″E	Subtropical montane moist evergreen broadleaf forest (~2079 m a.s.l.) on the W slope of the Mt. Fanjing (the place of collection is named as "The Ten-Month Pregnancy Tree" (十月怀胎树 in Chinese)), Fanjingshan National Nature Reserve, ~11 km SE of the town of Ziwei, Yinjiang County, Tongren Prefecture, Guizhou Province, S China.	2025-04	sp.		1007036	
2026-04-09	Didelphimorphia	Didelphidae	Monodelphis semilineata	Half-striped short-tailed opossum		NT	22°17′03″S 41°43′58″W	Remnants of the tropical lowland moist evergreen forest (~50 m a.s.l.) at Mata da Fazenda, ~2 km N of the settlement of Cabiúnas, Macaé Municipality, Rio de Janeiro, SW Brazil.	2010-08-06	sp.		1007034	
2026-04-30	Rodentia	Spalacidae	Spalax lyapunovae	Lyapunova’s blind mole rat		PA	43°50′07″N 42°40′56″E	Temperate montane shrubland (~1382 m a.s.l.) on the foothills of the Caucasus Mts., ~1.5 km S of the settlement of Pravoberezovsky, Predgorny District, ~7 km SSW of the town of Kislovodsk, Stavropol Krai, SW Russia.	2021-05-16	sp.	3738721	1007043	
2026-05-26	Rodentia	Muridae	Mus dumbara	Dumbara spiny mouse		IM	7°34′44″N 80°44′11″E	Tropical upland moist evergreen forest edge (~370 m a.s.l.) adjacent to a paddy field and located on the NE foot of the Dumbara Mountain Range, ~0.5 km NW of the village of Puwakpitiya, Matale District, Central Province, C Sri Lanka.	2004-03-11	sp.	3713418	1007040	
2026-05-28	Rodentia	Ctenomyidae	Ctenomys perrensi iberaensis	Perrens's tuco-tuco (iberaensis)		NT	28°00′23″S 57°35′45″W	Subtropical lowland marshy grassland (~60 m a.s.l.) adjacent to the Iberá Wetlands in the lower basin of the Paraná River, N boundary of the Iberá Provincial Reserve, near the town of San Miguel, San Miguel Department, Corrientes Province, NE Argentina.	1999-05-29	ssp.		1001350	
2026-05-29	Rodentia	Cricetidae	Peromyscus carminensis	Maderas del Carmen rock deermouse		NA	28°59′24″N 102°36′43″W	Temperate montane conifer-broadleaf forest (~2335 m a.s.l.) at Aserradero 2 of the Maderas del Carmen Biosphere Reserve, Ocampo Municipality, Coahuila, N Mexico.		sp.		1007039	
2026-05-29	Rodentia	Cricetidae	Peromyscus silvicola	Forest rock deermouse		NA	25°58′14″N 106°07′49″W	Subtropical montane conifer-broadleaf forest (~2993 m a.s.l.) in the central part of the Sierra Madre Occidental Mountain Range, ~10 km NWW of the settlement of San Pedro, Guanaceví Municipality, Durango, N Mexico.		sp.		1007042	
2026-06-01	Chiroptera	Vespertilionidae	Murina huanglianensis	Huanglianshan tube-nosed bat		IM	22°55′N 102°13′E	Subtropical montane moist evergreen broadleaf forest (~1883 m a.s.l.) in the NE part of the Indochinese Peninsula, near Fuha Management Station of the Huanglianshan National Nature Reserve, ~11 km N of the town of Qimaba, Lüchun County, Honghe Prefecture, Yunnan Province, SW China.	2024-09-13	sp.		1007035	
2026-06-08	Rodentia	Erethizontidae	Coendou sangay	Sangay porcupine		NT	2°23′20″S 78°18′06″W	Tropical montane moist evergreen broadleaf forest (~2400 m a.s.l.) on the E slopes of the Ecuadorian Andes, Sangay National Park, near the locality of Guabisai, ~16 km NW of the town of Sucúa, Sucúa Canton, Morona-Santiago Province, C Ecuador.	2015-03-27	sp.		1007044	
2026-06-11	Eulipotyphla	Talpidae	Uropsilus cinereonates	Gray-rumped shrew mole		PA	32°27′43″N 103°23′42″E	Temperate montane conifer forest on the SE edge of the Tibetan Plateau (~3232 m a.s.l.), ~40 km SW of the town of Chuanzhusi, Songpan County, Ngawa Prefecture, Sichuan Province, SW China.		sp.		1007053	
2026-06-11	Eulipotyphla	Talpidae	Uropsilus leptocranium	Slender skull shrew mole		PA	25°52′26″N 100°45′18″E	Subtropical montane seasonal mixed semi-evergreen forest (~3194 m a.s.l.) on the Mt. Wuding, ~16 km S of the town of Pingchuan, Binchuan County, Dali Prefecture, Yunnan Province, SW China.		sp.		1007054	
2026-06-11	Eulipotyphla	Talpidae	Uropsilus maximus	Large shrew mole		PA	30°40′59″N 102°40′26″E	Temperate montane mixed forest (~2855 m a.s.l.) on the SE edge of the Tibetan Plateau, Jiajin Mts., ~3 km W of the town of Qiaoqi, Baoxing County, Ya'an Prefecture, Sichuan Province, SW China.		sp.		1007055	
2026-06-11	Eulipotyphla	Talpidae	Uropsilus ningshanensis	Ningshan shrew mole		PA	33°45′36″N 108°46′16″E	Temperate montane semi-deciduous broadleaf forest (1190 m a.s.l.) in the E part of the Qinling Mts., near the town of Guanghuojie, Ningshan County, Ankang Prefecture, Shaanxi Province, C China.		sp.		1007056	
2026-06-11	Eulipotyphla	Talpidae	Uropsilus parvoniger	Black shrew mole		PA	25°58′41″N 98°40′19″E	Subtropical montane mixed forest (~3058 m a.s.l.) on the W slope of the Gaoligong Mts., ~5 km SE of the town of Pianma, Lushui County, Yunnan Province, SW China.		sp.		1007057	
2026-06-11	Eulipotyphla	Talpidae	Uropsilus wulingshanensis	Wuling shrew mole		PA	27°54′40″N 108°41′53″E	Subtropical montane moist evergreen broadleaf forest (~2093 m a.s.l.) on the E slope of the Mt. Fanjing, Fanjingshan National Nature Reserve, ~17 km N of the town of Taiping, Jiangkou County, Tongren Prefecture, Guizhou Province, S China.		sp.		1007058	
2026-06-12	Rodentia	Octodontidae	Apnoctomys conicetorum	Guasapampa viscacha rat		NT	31°09′32″S 65°27′03″W	Subtropical premontane dry forest (~500 m a.s.l.) on the W slope of the Mt. Guasapampa in the W part of the Pampas Mts., ~800 m NE of Casco de la Estancia Pinas, Traslasierra National Park, ~30 km W of the town of San Carlos Minas, Minas Department, Córdoba Province, C Argentina.	2023-04-01	sp.		1007047	
2026-06-15	Chiroptera	Vespertilionidae	Glauconycteris baka	Baka butterfly bat		AF	2°26′38″N 15°26′04″E	Tropical upland moist evergreen broadleaf forest (~520 m a.s.l.) in the upper basin of the Congo River, Lobéké National Park, near the village of Mambelé, Boumba-et-Ngoko Department, East Region, SE Cameroon.	2023-07-18	sp.	3712132	1007048	
2026-06-15	Chiroptera	Vespertilionidae	Glauconycteris lobeke	Lobéké butterfly bat		AF	2°23′42″N 15°31′47″E	Tropical upland moist evergreen broadleaf forest (~570 m a.s.l.) in the Congo Basin of the Congo River, Lobéké National Park, near the village of Djombi, Boumba-et-Ngoko Department, East Region, SE Cameroon.	2023-11-19	sp.	3712133	1007049	
2026-06-22	Chiroptera	Rhinopomatidae	Rhinopoma cystops occidentale	Arabian mouse-tailed bat (occidentale)		PA	20°55′54″N 11°37′23″W	Ruins of the ancient town of Ouadane surrounded by the tropical upland xeric woodland (427 m a.s.l.) and located in the SW part of the Sahara Desert, Adrar Region, C Mauritania.	2010-12-18	ssp.		1004770	
2026-06-22	Chiroptera	Rhinopomatidae	Rhinopoma funaiolii	Somali mouse-tailed bat		AF	10°59′00″N 49°03′00″E	Tropical montane xeric shrubland (~840 m a.s.l.) on the S coast of the Gulf of Aden, near the settlement of Galgala, Bosaso District, Bari Region, Puntland, NW Somalia.	1973-10-09	sp.		1007052	
2026-06-22	Chiroptera	Rhinopomatidae	Rhinopoma hardwickii persicum	Lesser mouse-tailed bat (persicum)		PA	31°45′17″N 49°48′39″E	Small cave in the temperate montane steppe (~985 m a.s.l.) on the SW slopes of the Zagros Mountains, ~3 km SE of the village of Chenarestan, Izeh County, Khuzestan Province, SW Iran.	1998-10-12	ssp.		1004772	
2026-06-24	Dasyuromorphia	Dasyuridae	Planigale petrophila	Arnhem planigale		AU	12°47′13″S 132°56′34″E	Tropical upland seasonal semi-evergreen woodland (~200 m a.s.l.) on the rocky slopes of the Mt. Brockman Plateau, Kakadu National Park, ~15 SE of the town of Jabiru, Northern Territory, N Australia.	2003-07-15	sp.		1007050	
2026-07-15	Primates	Cercopithecidae	Colobus congoensis	Likweli		AF	1°42′07″S 25°08′23″E	Tropical upland moist evergreen forest (~450 m a.s.l.) on the right bank of the Lomami River, Biondo Sector of the Lomami National Park, Tshopo Province, C DR Congo.		sp.	3591507	1007059	
2026-07-20	Rodentia	Muridae	Chiropodomys wandingensis	Wanding pencil-tailed tree mouse		IM	24°07′N 98°07′E	Subtropical montane monsoon evergreen forest (~1174 m a.s.l.) in the N part of the Indochinese Peninsula, ~5 km NE of the town of Wanding, Ruili City, Dehong Prefecture, Yunnan Province, SW China.	2019-07-10	sp.	3736123	1007064	
2026-07-23	Carnivora	Mephitidae	Conepatus semistriatus linaresi	Linares’s hog-nosed skunk		NT	11°51′N 69°59′W	Tropical lowland xeric shrubland (~70 m a.s.l.) in the central part of the Paraguaná Peninsula, near the settlement of Moruy, ~15 km SSW of the town of Pueblo Nuevo, Falcón Municipality, Falcón State, NW Venezuela.		ssp.		1005806	
2026-07-23	Carnivora	Mephitidae	Conepatus semistriatus ojastii	Ojasti’s hog-nosed skunk		NT	11°13′N 70°37′W	Tropical lowland xeric shrubland (~20 m a.s.l.) on the NW coast of South America, ~3.5 km NE of the town of Capatárida, Buchivacoa Municipality, Falcón State, NW Venezuela.		ssp.			1005806
2026-09-17	Carnivora	Felidae	Leopardus tilcayo	Tilcayo		NT		entirely endemic to the high-altitude Yungas cloud forests of Bolivia.		sp.			

== See also ==
- List of bird species described in the 2020s
- American Society of Mammalogists
