= Ngoc Linh mole =

Scientific classification
- Kingdom: Animalia
- Phylum: Chordata
- Class: Mammalia
- Order: Eulipotyphla
- Family: Talpidae
- Genus: Euroscaptor
- Species: E. ngoclinhensis

Binomial name
- Euroscaptor ngoclinhensis Zemlemerova, Bannikova, Levedev, & Abramov, 2016
- Ngoc Linh mole range

Synonyms
- Euroscaptor parvidens ngoclinhensis

Species of mammal

The Ngoc Linh mole (Euroscaptor ngoclinhensis) is a species of mammal in the family Talpidae. It is endemic to central Vietnam. It was named after Ngọc Linh mountain, which it was first discovered in the vicinity of.

== Taxonomy ==
E. ngoclinhensis was described in 2016 as a subspecies of the small-toothed mole (E. parvidens), with several anatomical differences distinguishing it from the nominate subspecies. However, a 2020 study found prominent differences in overall size and proportions between ngoclinhensis and parvidens sensu stricto, and thus split E. ngoclinhensis as its own distinct species. E. ngoclinhensis is thought to have split from E. parvidens during the late Pliocene or early Pleistocene, about 4.6 to 2.0 million years ago.

== Distribution ==
This species is thought to be endemic to the Central Highlands of Vietnam, in Kon Tum and Quang Nam provinces. Moles from Gia Lai Province may also belong to this species.

== Description ==
This is a small-sized mole only comparable to the Vietnamese mole (E. subanura) in size. It has a bulb-shaped tail and a long and moderately wide rostrum. It has a smaller body & skull size and shorter upper & lower tooth rows than E. parvidens.
