= San Miguel Department =

San Miguel Department may refer to:

- San Miguel Department (El Salvador)
- San Miguel Department, Corrientes, Argentina
