= Oliver's warty pig =

Conservation status
- Vulnerable (IUCN 3.1)

Scientific classification
- Kingdom: Animalia
- Phylum: Chordata
- Class: Mammalia
- Order: Artiodactyla
- Family: Suidae
- Genus: Sus
- Species: S. oliveri

Binomial name
- Sus oliveri Groves, 1997
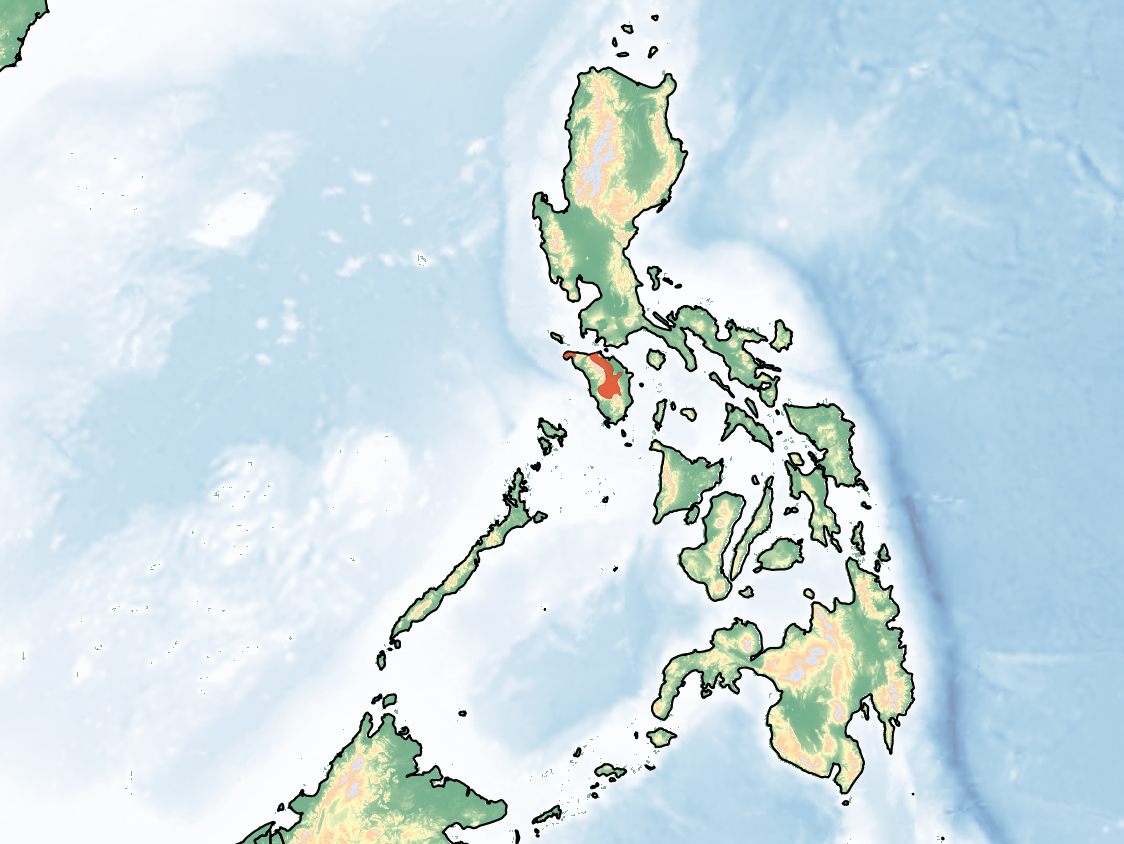
- Range of Sus oliveri

Species of mammal

Oliver's warty pig or the Mindoro warty pig (Sus oliveri) is a small species in the pig genus (Sus) which can only be found on the island of Mindoro in the Philippines. It was previously considered to be a subspecies of the Philippine warty pig (S. philippensis), however it was shown to be morphologically and genetically distinct. The species is heavily hunted by the local people and is extremely rare.

== Range and habitat ==
Oliver's warty pig is endemic to Mindoro, where it was at one point widely distributed and common. More recent surveys have found that its range has now been reduced to habitats in higher elevations (above 800 metres) in the central and northwestern mountain ranges of the island. Encounters are becoming less frequent. Tracks have been observed in forests, creeks, riverbanks, grassland, swamps, and indigenous cropland.

As of 2015, its presence had been recently confirmed in the Bongabong Mindoro watershed in the east of the island, and the watersheds of the Anahawin, Lumintao, and Kinarawan rivers in the west, as well as the Aruyan-Malati Tamaraw Reservation Area, Mount Halcon, Mount Wood, the Siburan Forest, Tusk Peak, and the Mount Calavite Wildlife Sanctuary. It was also speculated to exist at Mount Malasimbo in the north of the island.

== Ecology ==
Sus oliveri is presumed to feed on a variety of plant material, such as tubers, fallen fruit, and invertebrates. It has also been reported to feed on root crops in indigenous upland crop fields, where slash-and-burn agriculture (kaingin) is practiced.

== Conservation ==
Threats to the species include deforestation (leading to population fragmentation), genetic contamination via hybridization with domestic pigs, and hunting. The species is widely hunted for food, the bushmeat trade, and indigenous ceremonies. The species is listed as "Vulnerable" on the IUCN Red List.

== See also ==
- Wild pigs of the Philippines
