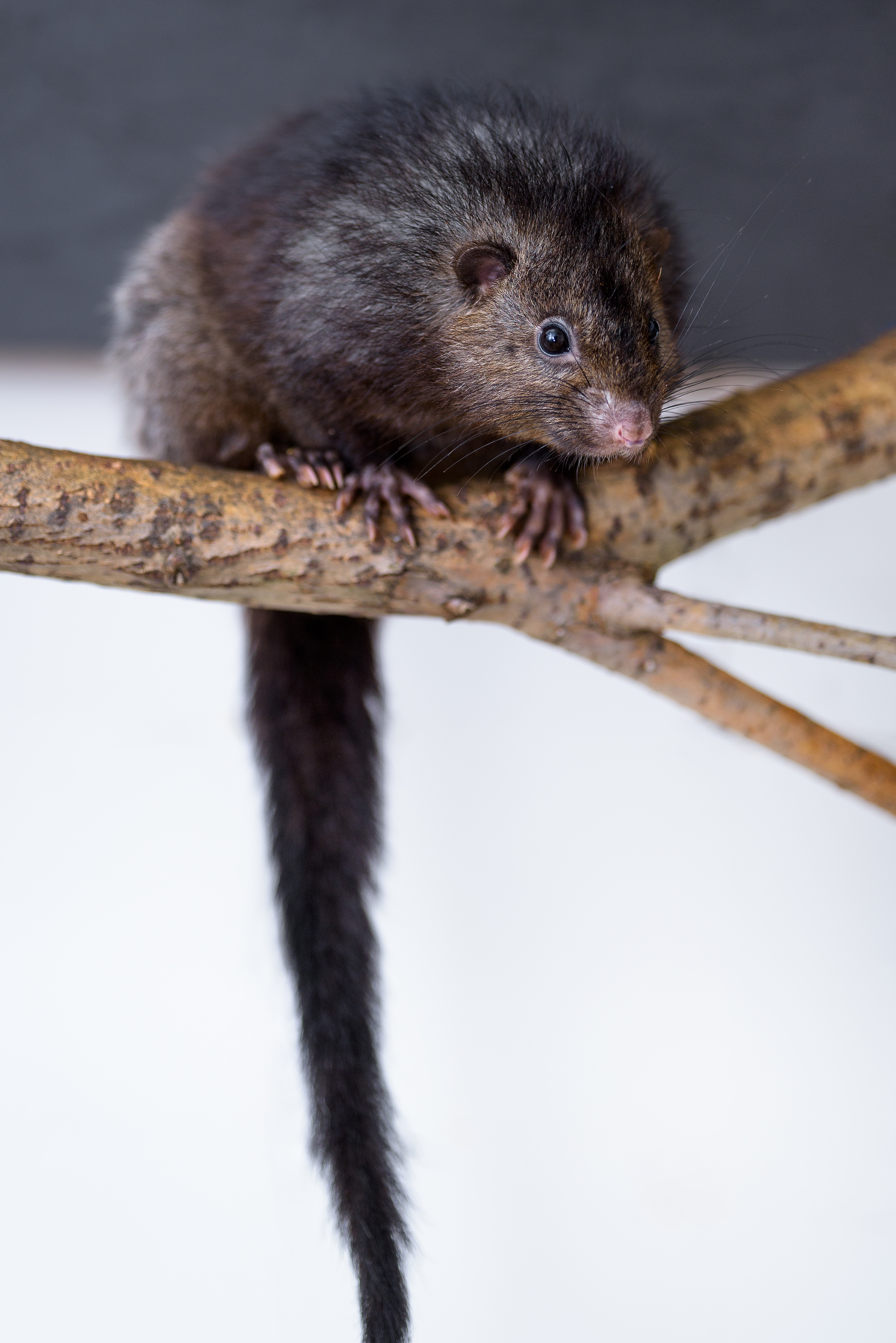
- Crateromys heaneyi

Scientific classification
- Kingdom: Animalia
- Phylum: Chordata
- Class: Mammalia
- Order: Rodentia
- Family: Muridae
- Subfamily: Murinae
- Tribe: Phloeomyini
- Genus: Crateromys; Thomas, 1895

Type species
- Phloeomys schadenbergi

Species
- Crateromys australis Crateromys ballik Crateromys heaneyi Crateromys paulus Crateromys schadenbergi

= Crateromys =

Genus of rodents

Crateromys is a genus of rodent, native to the Philippines, in the family Muridae. It contains four extant species, and one extinct species.

- Dinagat bushy-tailed cloud rat (Crateromys australis)
- Giant bushy-tailed cloud rat (Crateromys schadenbergi)
- Panay bushy-tailed cloud rat (Crateromys heaneyi)
- Ilin Island bushy-tailed cloud rat (Crateromys paulus)
- †Sierra Madre bushy-tailed cloud rat Crateromys ballik
