= Mindanao–Eastern Visayas rain forests =

Ecoregion in the Philippines

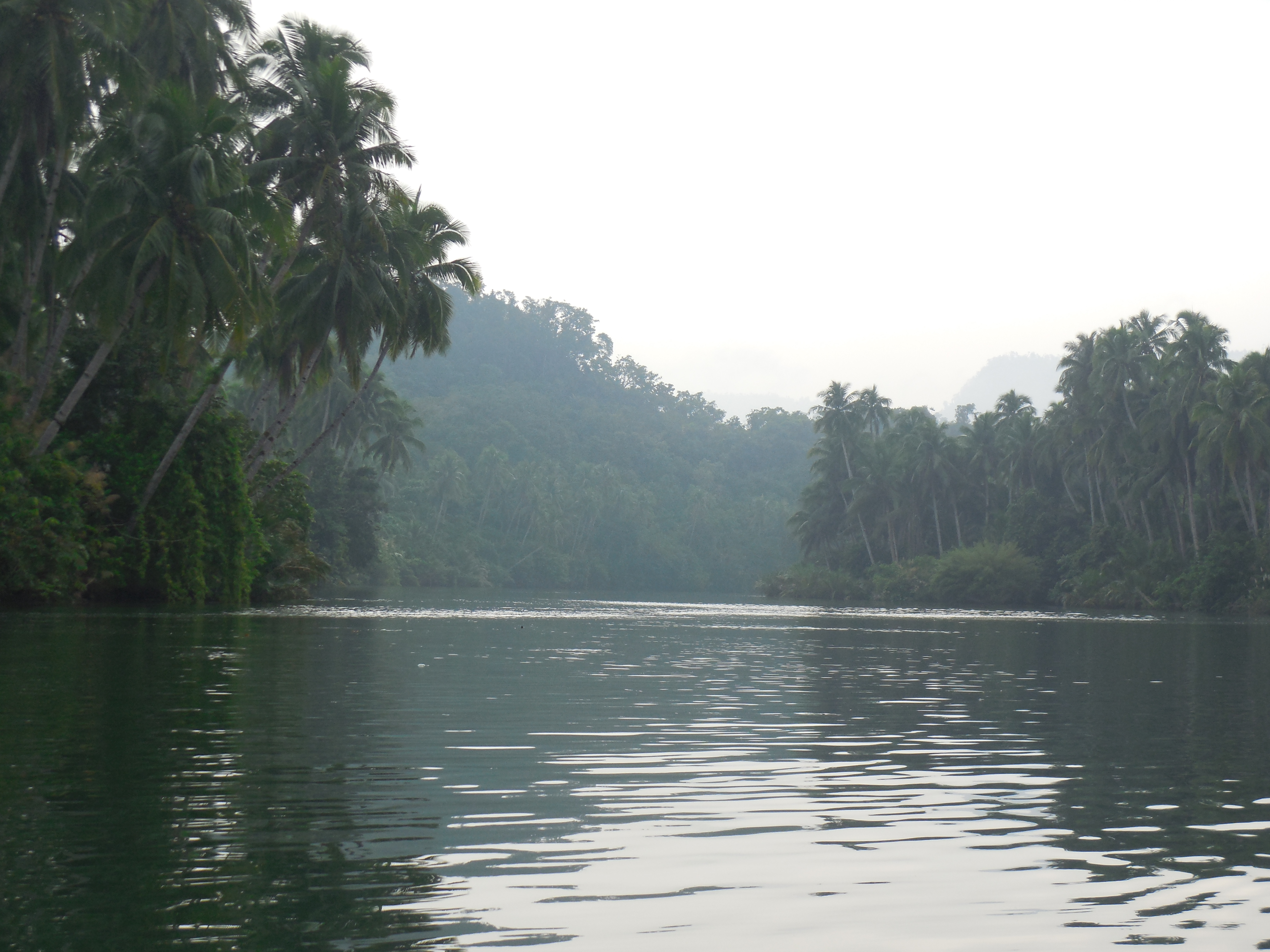
- Cadacan River, Samar Island

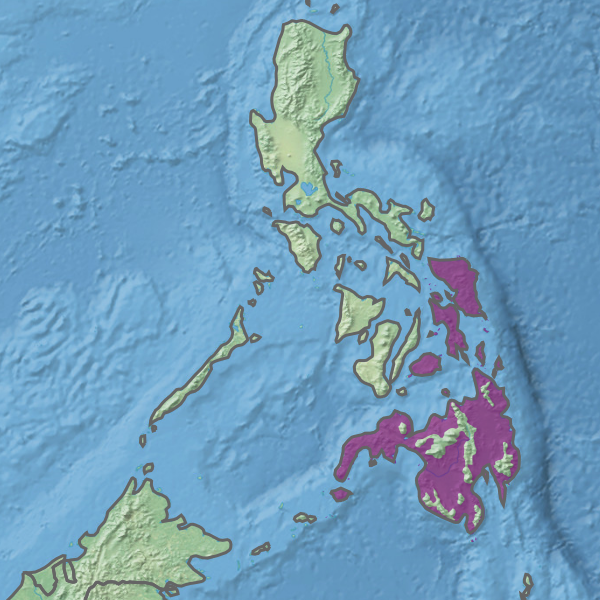
- Ecoregion territory (in purple)

Ecology
- Realm: Indomalayan
- Biome: Tropical and subtropical moist broadleaf forests
- Borders: Mindanao montane rain forests

Geography
- Area: 105,339 km^{2} (40,672 mi^{2})
- Country: Philippines
- Coordinates: 8.25°N 125.75°E

The Mindanao–Eastern Visayas rain forests ecoregion (WWF ID: IM0129) covers the lowland rain forests of the island of Mindanao and of the easternmost of the Visayas Islands in the Philippines. Although 63% of this ecoregion is covered with closed broadleaf evergreen forest or open forest, much of this has been disturbed in the past by human activity, and many of the rare species of the area have been relegated to the isolated areas or higher elevations.

== Location and description ==
Mindanao is the southernmost large island of the Philippines. The Visayas Islands occupy the center of the Philippines; this ecoregion includes the eastern Visayas - the largest islands of the ecoregion being Leyte, Samar, and Bohol. There are also a number of smaller islands, including Camiguin, Basilan, and Dinagat. The lowland forests are below 1,000 meters in elevation, with a few small peak up to 1,400 meters, and the median for the ecoregion being 234 metres (768 ft).

== Climate ==
The climate of the ecoregion is Tropical rainforest climate (Köppen climate classification (Af)). This climate is characterized as hot, humid, and having at least 60 mm of precipitation every month. An important factor in this ecoregion is whether the location is in the main typhoon track from July to November. The northern portions of Leyte and Samar are in this track, while the island of Mindanao and its satellite islands are not. For the locations in the typhoon track, up to a third of annual precipitation may occur during typhoons.

== Flora and fauna ==
Although this ecoregion is spread among many islands, the floristic communities are related, as Mindanao and the eastern Visayas were all one connected island in the lower sea levels of the Pleistocene (the ice age from 2.8 million years ago to 11,700 years ago). Currently, 43% of the ecoregion is closed broadleaf evergreen forest, 20% is open forest, 9% is under cultivation for agriculture, and 5% is non-forest herbaceous cover.

Beach vegetation merges into beach forest away from the coast, featuring trees of genus Casuarina (a tall evergreen with feather-like leaves) and Barringtonia. The lowland rain forests are dominated by trees of genus (Dipterocarpus) up through 400 meters. As elevations increase the dipterocarps are joined by Pterocarpus indicus, Pandans Pandanus, and others. Upper hill dipterocarp forests are found from 650 meters to 1,000 meters, where the dominant trees are Shorea polysperma, oaks, chestnuts, and elaeocarps. Above 1,000 meters, the ecoregions transitions into montane rain forest.

The small outlying islands preserve distinctive sub-ecoregions. Camiguin Island, with an area of 238 km2, that has two endemic mammal species and an endemic frog. Dinagat Island has three endemic mammal species, including the elusive Dinagat bushy-tailed cloud rat (Crateromys australis). Mindanao supports the vulnerable Philippine deer (Cervus mariannus nigricans).

== Protected areas ==
About 8% of the ecoregion is officially protected. These protected areas include:

- Mount Apo Natural Park
- Mount Malindang Natural Park
- Kitanglad Mountain Range Natural Park
