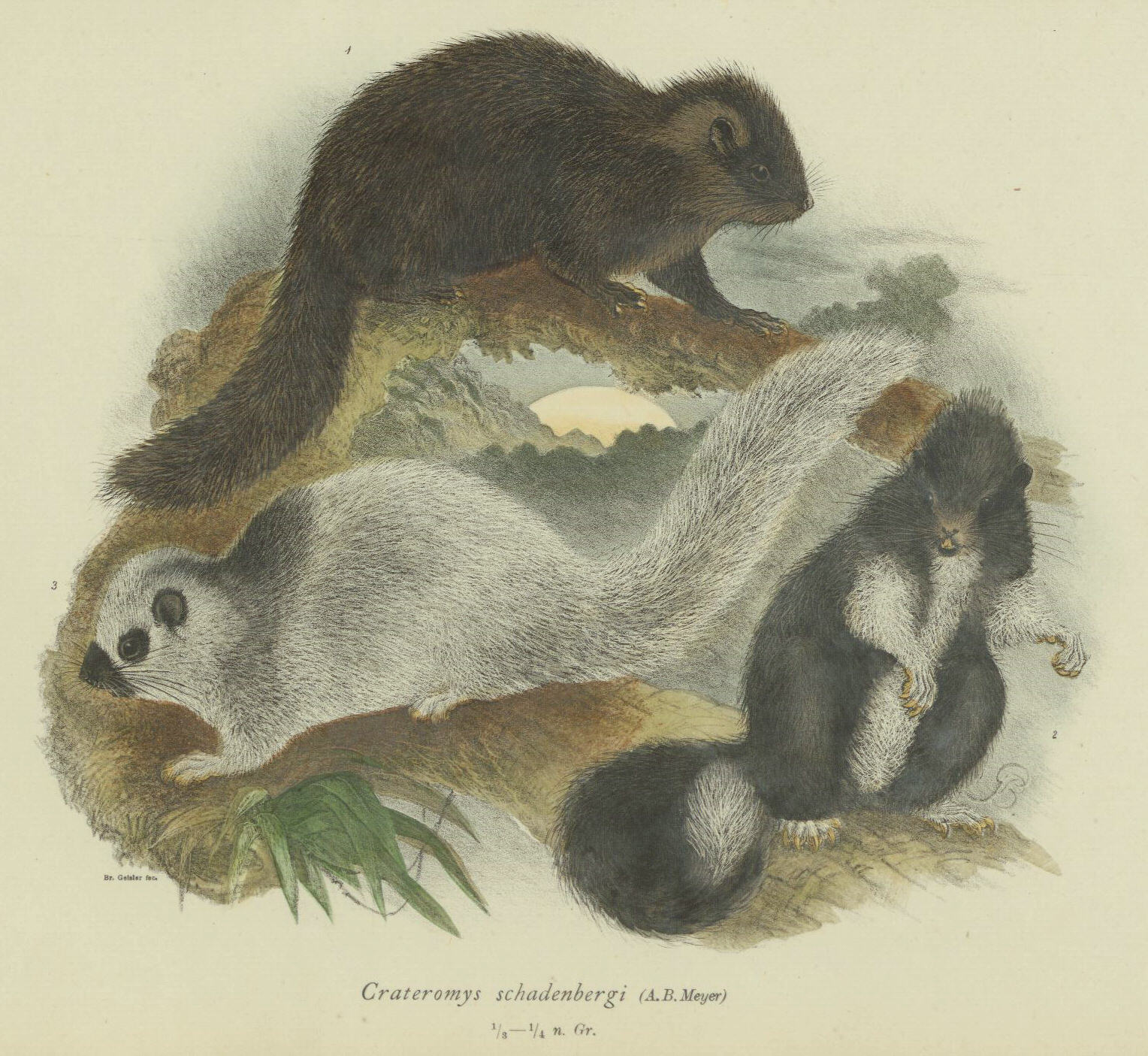

Conservation status
- Endangered (IUCN 3.1)

Scientific classification
- Kingdom: Animalia
- Phylum: Chordata
- Class: Mammalia
- Order: Rodentia
- Family: Muridae
- Genus: Crateromys
- Species: C. schadenbergi

Binomial name
- Crateromys schadenbergi (Meyer, 1895)
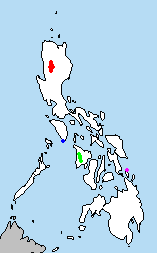
- Range in red

= Giant bushy-tailed cloud rat =

Species of rodent

The giant bushy-tailed cloud rat or Luzon bushy-tailed cloud rat (Crateromys schadenbergi) is a large, endangered species of rodent in the family Muridae. It is only found in pine and mossy forest at altitudes of 2,000–2,740 metres (6,560–8,990 ft) in the Central Cordillera of Luzon, the Philippines. Relatively little is known about its behavior, but it is nocturnal, mainly arboreal and feeds on various types of vegetation.

It is rarer than the northern Luzon giant cloud rat, a shorter-haired species that mainly occurs at lower elevations, but locally the giant bushy-tailed cloud rat remains moderately common in oak-pine forest. The primary threats are hunting and habitat loss.

The appearance of the giant bushy-tailed cloud rat has been described as spectacular, and it appears to be an equivalent of large tropical tree squirrels, which are not naturally found in Luzon. It weighs 1.35–1.5 kilograms (3.0–3.3 lb) and is 73.5–76 centimetres (28.9–29.9 in) long. The very long, soft fur, which also covers the tail, is typically all black, but some individuals have white patches.
