= Vietnamese mole =

Conservation status
- Least Concern (IUCN 3.1)

Scientific classification
- Kingdom: Animalia
- Phylum: Chordata
- Class: Mammalia
- Order: Eulipotyphla
- Family: Talpidae
- Genus: Euroscaptor
- Species: E. subanura

Binomial name
- Euroscaptor subanura Kawada et al., 2012
- Vietnamese mole range

Species of mammal

The Vietnamese mole (Euroscaptor subanura) is a species of talpine mole found in Vietnam.

The species was first identified in December 2008 in the foothills of the Tam Dao mountains in northern Vietnam. At the time of the formal description of the species in 2012, only nine specimens had been collected, including three that had been held at the Vietnam Academy of Science and Technology, but that had not been previously identified as belonging to a new species. The latter were confirmed as belonging to a new species due to their unique appearance, and from karyotypic analysis.

The mole lives in deciduous forest among limestone hills between about 200 and 300 metres (660 and 980 ft) elevation. They construct large mole hills, and are thought to be similar to other talpine moles in their habits. They are small and slender moles, with a head-body length of 11 to 12 centimetres (4.3 to 4.7 in), and weighing 34 to 43 grams (1.2 to 1.5 oz). They have a slender, hairless snout with many whisker-like protuberances around the nostrils. The tail is extremely short, measuring only 4 to 5 millimetres (0.16 to 0.20 in) in length, and is barely visible beyond the animal's fur. This remarkably short tail, said to "resemble a wart" in the original paper, is thought to be diagnostic for the species, and is the source of its scientific name, subanura, which means "almost tail-less".

The closest living relative of Euroscaptor subanura is thought to be the small-toothed mole of southern Vietnam.
