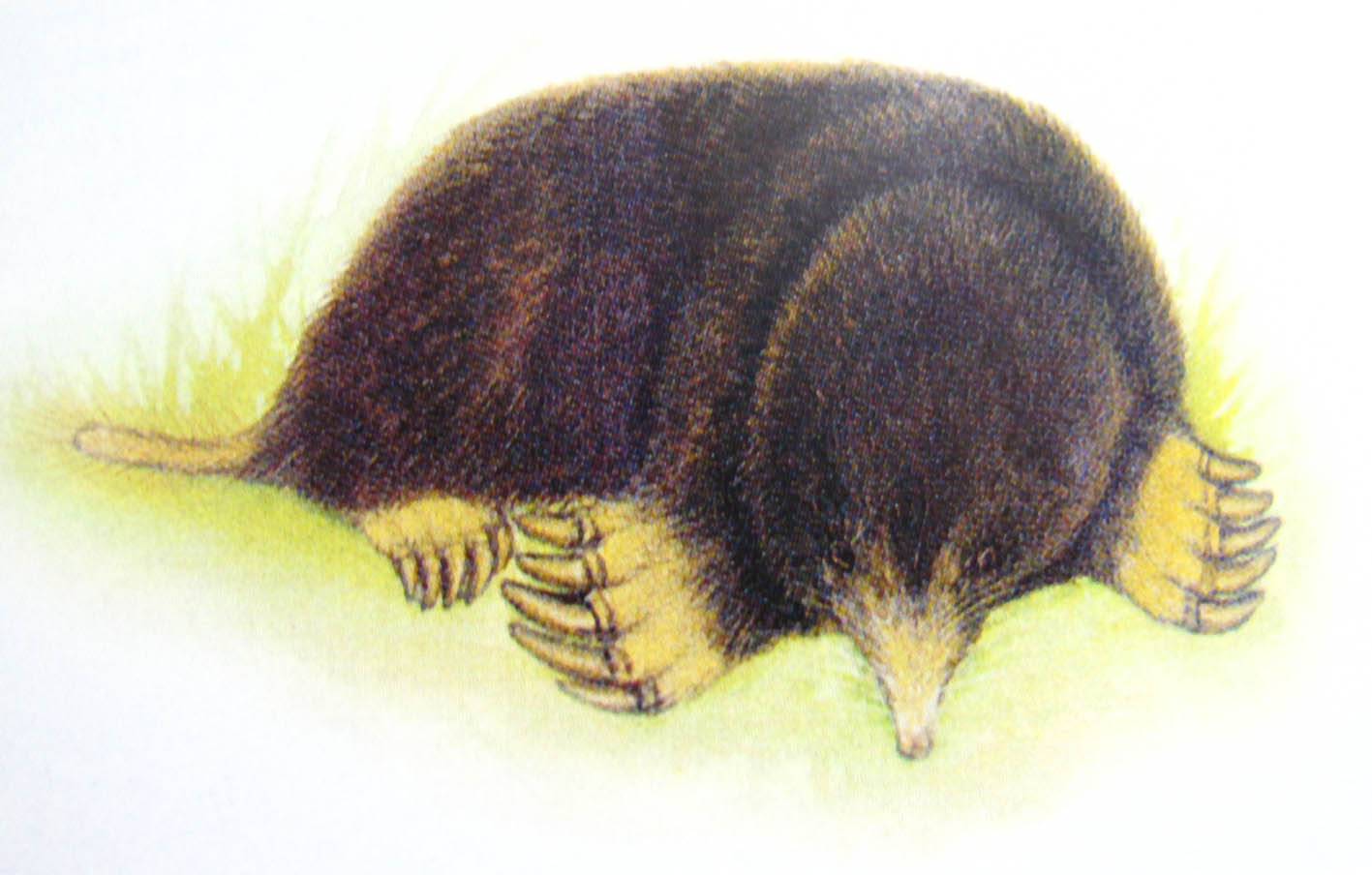
- Greater Chinese mole (Euroscaptor grandis)

Scientific classification
- Kingdom: Animalia
- Phylum: Chordata
- Class: Mammalia
- Order: Eulipotyphla
- Family: Talpidae
- Tribe: Talpini
- Genus: Euroscaptor; Miller, 1940

Type species
- Talpa klossi Thomas, 1929

Species
- 10 recognized species, see text

= Euroscaptor =

Genus of mammals

Euroscaptor is a genus of mammal in the family Talpidae. Members are found in China and South & Southeast Asia. It contains the following species as of October 2021:

- Euroscaptor darwini Nguyen Truong Son, Hai Tuan Bui, Vinh Quang Dau, Phuong Dinh Le & Yen Huong Vu, 2025
- Greater Chinese mole (Euroscaptor grandis)
- Kloss's mole (Euroscaptor klossi)
- Kuznetsov's mole (Euroscaptor kuznetsovi)
- Long-nosed mole (Euroscaptor longirostris)
- Malaysian mole (Euroscaptor malayanus)
- Himalayan mole (Euroscaptor micrurus)
- Ngoc Linh mole (Euroscaptor ngoclinhensis)
- Orlov's mole (Euroscaptor orlovi)
- Small-toothed mole (Euroscaptor parvidens)
- Vietnamese mole (Euroscaptor subanura)
