= Mindoro rain forests =

Ecoregion in Mindoro, the Philippines

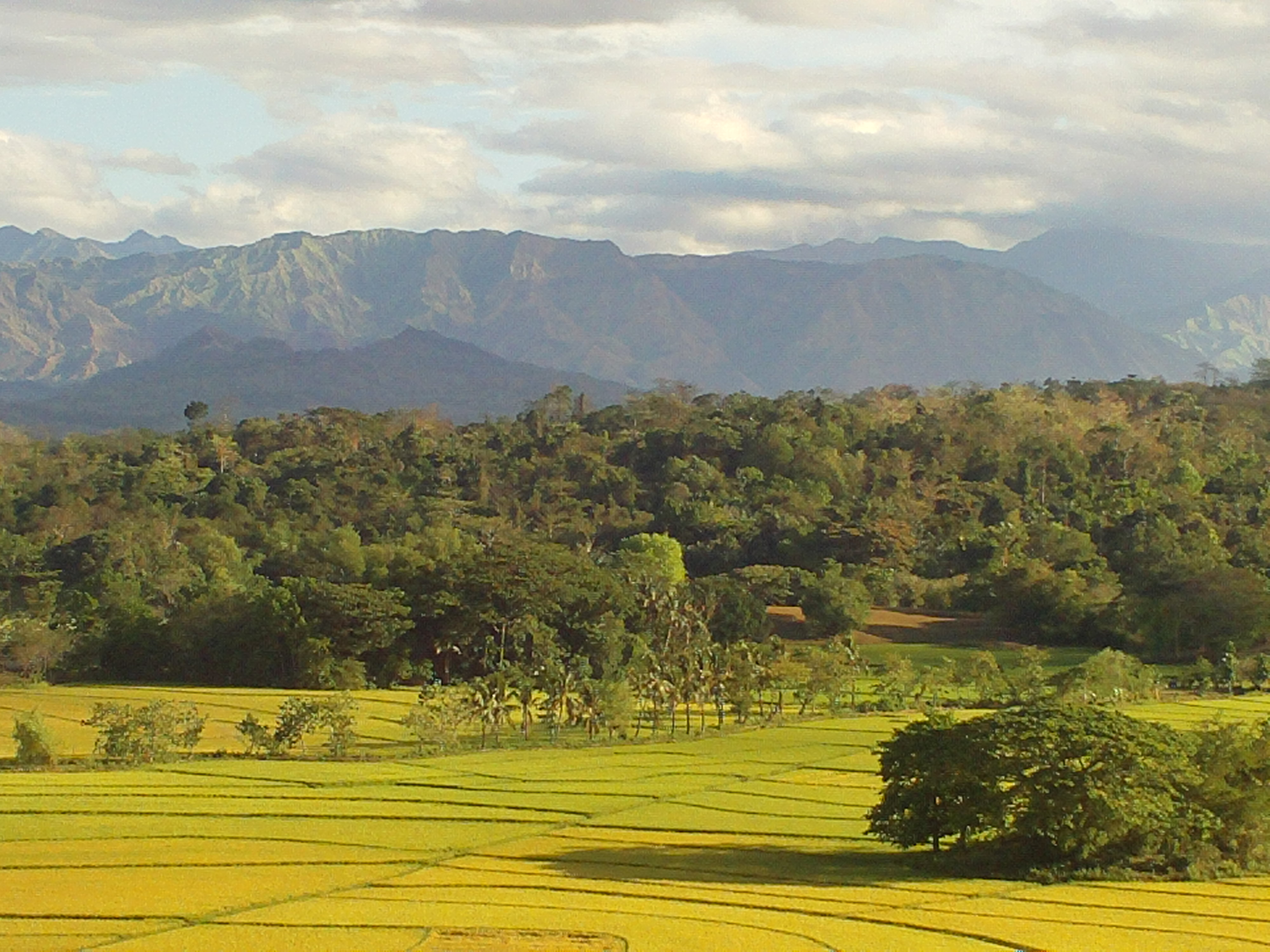
- Agriculture and forest in western Mindoro

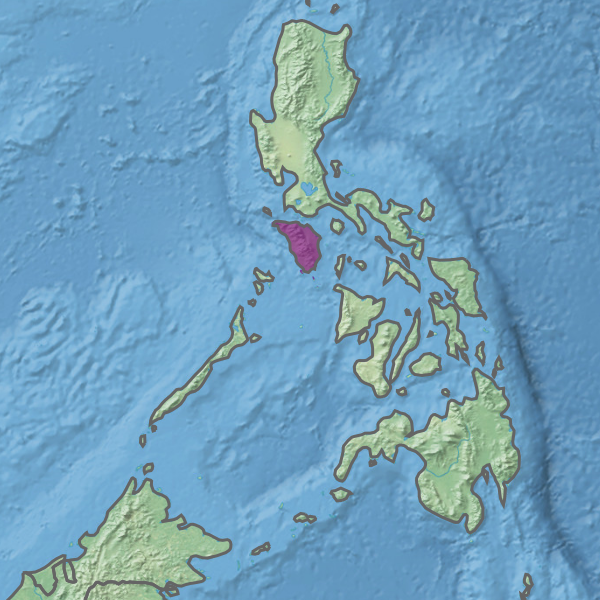
- Ecoregion territory (in purple)

Ecology
- Realm: Indomalayan
- Biome: Tropical and subtropical moist broadleaf forests

Geography
- Area: 10,140 km^{2} (3,920 sq mi)
- Country: Philippines
- Coordinates: 12.25°N 121.25°E

The Mindoro rain forests ecoregion (WWF ID:IM0130) covers the island of Mindoro, which lies between the island of Luzon and the Palawan Archipelago in the Philippines. The island has been subject to heavy commercial logging, with the only original forests remaining on the high ridge of the central mountain range. Logging has been reduced long enough on the east side of the mountains to support a regrown forest and a number of endemic species.

== Location and description ==
Although the ecoregion is primarily on the island of Mindoro, it also includes a group of small islands to the southeast centered on (Semirara Island), and to the northwest centered on (Lubang Island). These small islands are isolated enough that they may support endemic species. The main island of Mindoro is divided by a north-south mountain range, with the east side more heavily forested than the west. The highest point is Mount Halcon, at 2,586 metres (8,484 ft). Because there are deepwater channels between Mindoro and Luzon, and Mindoro and the Palawans, the island was not connected by land bridges during the Pleistocene recent (Ice Age). It thus retains a distinctive community of flora and fauna, but there are affinities to the larger islands.

== Climate ==
The climate of the ecoregion is Tropical monsoon climate (Köppen climate classification (Am)). This climate is characterized by relatively even temperatures throughout the year (all months being greater than 18 °C (64 °F) average temperature), and a pronounced dry season. The driest month has less than 60 mm of precipitation, but more than (100-(average/25) mm. This climate is mid-way between a tropical rainforest and a tropical savannah. The dry month usually at or right after the winter solstice in the Northern Hemisphere. The wet season in the ecoregion is June to October.

== Flora and fauna ==
Although the original forest has been mostly logged or degraded by human activity, the island is currently about 60% covered with closed forest, mostly broadleaf evergreen. Another 13% is open forest, 10% is herbaceous cover, and the remainder is human settlement and cropland.

There are 42 species of mammals on Mindoro, seven of which are endemic. Mammals of conservation interest include the critically endangered Mindoro dwarf buffalo (Bubalus mindorensis), and the critically endangered Ilin Island cloudrunner (Crateromys paulus).

== Protected areas ==
About 16% of the ecoregion is officially protected. These protected areas include:

- Mounts Iglit–Baco National Park
- Naujan Lake National Park
