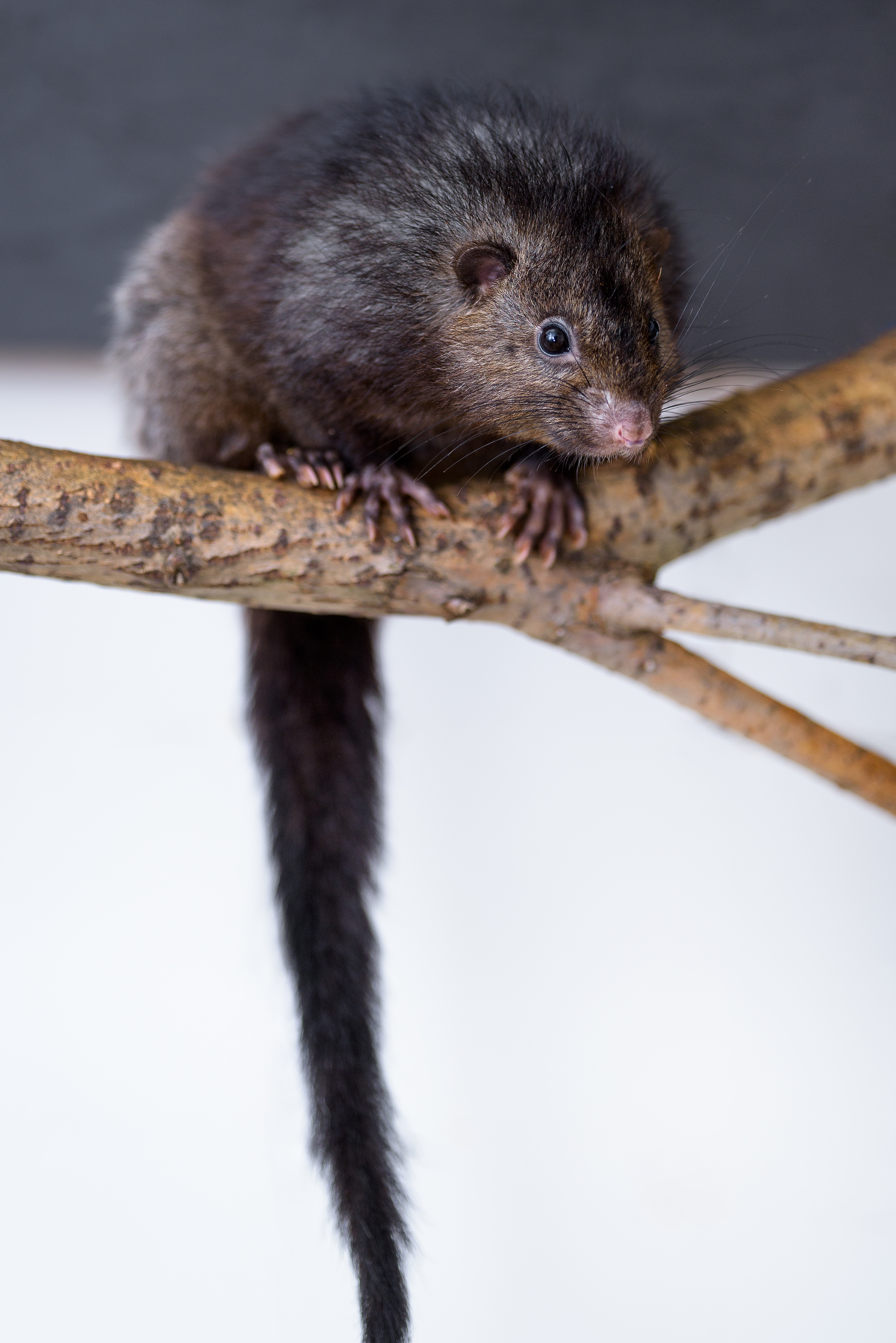

Conservation status
- Endangered (IUCN 3.1)

Scientific classification
- Kingdom: Animalia
- Phylum: Chordata
- Class: Mammalia
- Infraclass: Placentalia
- Order: Rodentia
- Family: Muridae
- Genus: Crateromys
- Species: C. heaneyi

Binomial name
- Crateromys heaneyi Gonzales & Kennedy, 1996
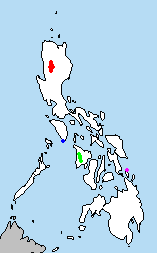
- Range in green

= Panay cloudrunner =

Species of rodent

The Panay cloudrunner (Crateromys heaneyi) is the second-largest cloud rat, a squirrel-like rodent that is found on the island of Panay in the Philippines. It is the most endangered rodent species in Panay, and one of few known cloud rat species in the world.

== Discovery ==
The Panay cloudrunner was discovered by western science in 1987, and was described as a new species in 1996 by Robert Kennedy of the Cincinnati Museum of Natural History and Pedro Gonzales of the National Museum of the Philippines. The late date of discovery was because the lack of forest cover on Panay which led to the island being largely ignored by biologists.

== Description ==
The Panay cloudrunner is a little over 600 mm long, with grizzled greyish-brown fur and a long, bushy tail making up more than half of the body length. It weighs around 1 kilogram.

== Habits ==
The cloudrunner is nocturnal and arboreal, and nests during the day in the hollow of a large tree. Its diet includes bananas, guavas, corn, papayas, and assorted leaves.

== Conservation ==
Continued deforestation on the island of Panay is the major threat to this species, and the animal is now confined to remnant forest in a mountain range on the western end of the island.
