= San Miguel, Corrientes =

San Miguel Sán Miguél
- Town
- Location of San Miguel in Argentina
- Coordinates: 28°00′S 58°34′W
- Country: Argentina
- Province: Corrientes
- Department: San Miguel
- Elevation: 61 m (200 ft)

Population
  - Total: 7,396
- Time zone: UTC−3 (ART)
- CPA base: W3485
- Dialing code: +54 3781

San Miguel (Guarani: Sán Miguél) is a town in Corrientes Province, Argentina. It is the head town of the San Miguel Department.
