= Euroscaptor darwini =

- Varying angles of Euroscaptor Darwini

Scientific classification
- Kingdom: Animalia
- Phylum: Chordata
- Class: Mammalia
- Order: Eulipotyphla
- Family: Talpidae
- Genus: Euroscaptor
- Species: E. darwini

Binomial name
- Euroscaptor darwini Nguyen, Bui, Dau, Le & Vu, 2025

Small underground-dwelling mammal

Euroscaptor darwini, commonly referred to as Darwin's mole, is a small underground-dwelling mammal discovered in the mountain forests of north-central Vietnam. It was named in honor of Charles Darwin.

== Physical characteristics ==
Darwin's moles can reach up to about 5 inches in length. They are covered in dense, velvety, dark greyish-black fur with a metallic silvery shine. They have an extremely short tail with only six or seven vertebrae, the lowest number in its genus. They have a slender cranium, narrow snout (rostrum), elongated inner zygomatic arches, and small front teeth. Its eyes are hidden completely beneath the skin, and its front paws have strong, chisel-shaped claws built for digging tunnels. Adult females are much larger than their male counterparts.

== Habitat ==
Euroscaptor darwini spends its life underground in mountain soils and uses sensitive whiskers on its snout to navigate and find food. They live in moist evergreen forests located in high limestone mountain ranges at elevations between 900 and 1,100 meters.
