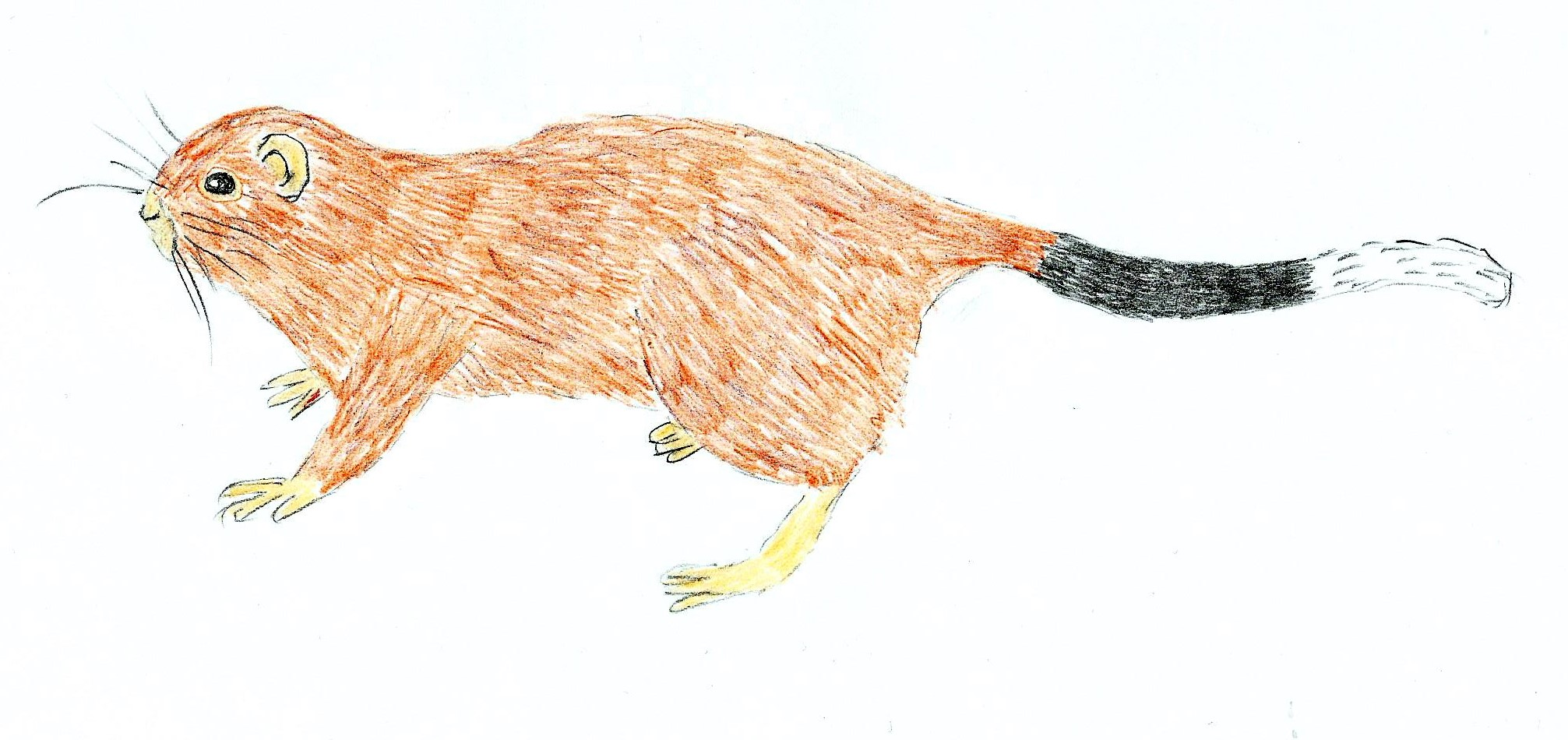

Conservation status
- Endangered (IUCN 3.1)

Scientific classification
- Kingdom: Animalia
- Phylum: Chordata
- Class: Mammalia
- Order: Rodentia
- Family: Muridae
- Genus: Crateromys
- Species: C. australis

Binomial name
- Crateromys australis Musser, Heaney & Rabor, 1985
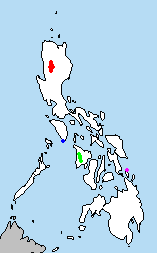
- Range in pink

= Dinagat bushy-tailed cloud rat =

Species of rodent

The Dinagat bushy-tailed cloud rat, Dinagat crateromys or Dinagat cloud rat (Crateromys australis) is a species of cloud rat in the family Muridae. It is one of the eight cloud rats found only in the Philippines, and is specifically endemic to Dinagat Island. It is known locally as hawili. A single specimen was discovered in 1975 by Dioscoro S. Rabor and his team during a scientific survey in Dinagat. The natural habitat is tropical lowland forests, which are facing environmental threats. Habitat loss is caused by progressive deforestation from heavy logging and chromite mining in the area. Almost 40 years after the original discovery, five live specimens were discovered by Milada Řeháková, Václav Řehák and William L.R. Oliver, in 2012.

== Discovery and rediscovery ==
The Dinagat bushy-tailed cloud rat was first seen in 1975 in Balitbiton, Loreto Municipality, Surigao del Norte Province, Dinagat island during a scientific faunal survey. The only specimen (now the holotype) was collected by Dioscoro S. Rabor of the University of the Philippines on 16 May 1975. It was found in a disturbed lowland forest, near a logging road. It was stuffed to preserve its skin, cranium, mandibles and baculum (the penile bone). It was deposited in the American Museum of Natural History. Rabor, with Guy G. Musser of the American Museum of Natural History and Lawrence R. Heaney of the University of Michigan, reported the full description after 10 years, in 1985. (The same survey also resulted in the discovery of other new species of rat, the Dinagat moonrat, Podogymnura aureospinula and later, the Dinagat hairy-tailed rat, Batomys russatus.) The main reason the species is hard to observe is that it is nocturnal and arboreal. No other specimen had been known until 2012. In January 2012, Czech zoologists noticed a living specimen in a semi-protected watershed reserve site in central-north Dinagat. The team led by Milada Řeháková and her husband made a video film of it.

Řeháková had been officially investigating the Philippine tarsier Tarsius syrichta on Bohol for three years, during 2009-2012. Supported by the Philippine Biodiversity Conservation Foundation, Inc., she extended her research in Dinagat for its threatened and genetically isolated Philippine tarsier populations. She surveyed the Loreto Municipality for 10 days, between 5 and 15 January 2012. She failed to find any tarsier. However, using vocalisation records, her team detected the rustling movements and calls of a cloud rat, which were distinct from those of tarsiers. For three nights, as dusk fell (local time 17:55–18:35 hr), they recorded the same sounds. On 8 January (18:05 h) the actual cloud rat was spotted, and was documented using still and video cameras. The rat fled when flashes were on. It was first seen by her husband, Václav Řehák. It was again seen on 11 January around the same time in the evening but at a little distance from the previous location. It was again seen on 14 January at the original location. They presented their findings at the Wildlife Conservation Society of the Philippines symposium on 17–20 April 2012. Their technical report was only on 20 June 2015 in the Journal of Threatened Taxa.

== Etymology ==
The species name australis is derived from a Latin word meaning "southern". It is given the name because it is the only species under the genus Crateromys to be found in the southern Philippines.

== Description ==
The original specimen was an adult male. It is medium in size among the species of Crateromys, and measures 26.5 cm (10.4 in) from head to body rear. The tail is longer than the body, measuring 28 cm (11 in). In contrast to other species, it has tawny and orange coloured fur, lacking the colour patterns on its body, its ears are dark in colour, its head lacks crest of fur, and the tail is striped in three colours with short and stiff hairs. The head is uniformly coloured but is broken around the eyes, where the colour appears in rings of darkly pigmented skin surrounded by short, pale-brown hairs. The underfur on the back (dorsum) is gray and coarse. Short black hairs start from the middle of the dorsum and gradually disappear on all sides. The ears are round and heavily pigmented. Short brown hairs grow on the top half of each ear. The throat and belly region are bright orange-brown, and uniform throughout the body. The scrotum is covered by gold-coloured hairs. Each leg is about 5.4 cm (2.1 in) long.

== Conservation ==
Since its discovery in 1975 and until its rediscovery in 2012, only one male specimen was available, even after several expeditions in Dinagat. The habitat in Dinagat is a Mineral Reserve under the Philippines Republic Act No. 391 issued in 1939 by the Department of Environment and Natural Resources under the then-colonial government of the United States. As a result, most of the forest is logged down by mining companies. Many initiatives to change the law have been made but all failed as the mining industry controls various political dynasties in the Philippines.

== Literature ==
- Musser, G. G.; Carleton, M. D. (2005). "Superfamily Muroidea". In Wilson, D. E.; Reeder, D. M. (eds.). Mammal Species of the World: A Taxonomic and Geographic Reference (3rd ed.). Johns Hopkins University Press. pp. 894–1531. ISBN 978-0-8018-8221-0. OCLC 62265494.
