= Fanjingshan =

Mountain in China

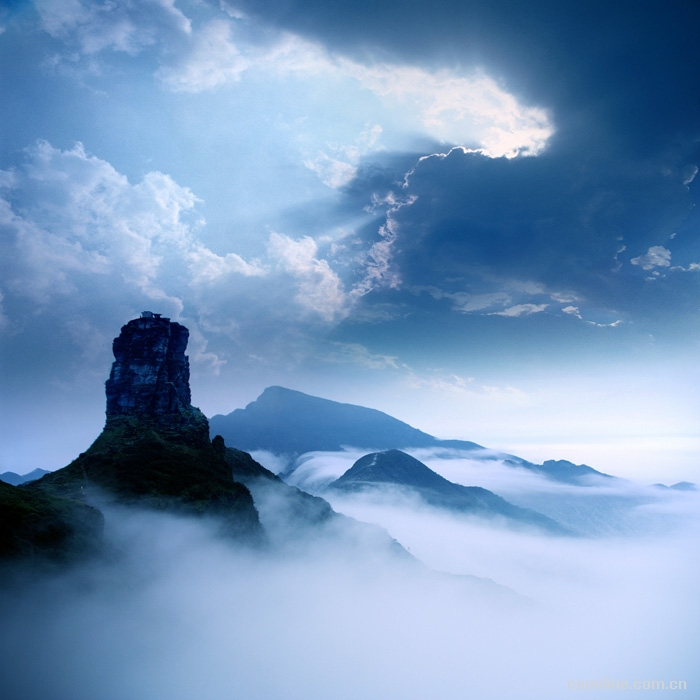
- The "Red Cloud Golden Peak" (New Golden Peak) of Fanjingshan

Highest point
- Elevation: 2,570 m (8,430 ft)
- Coordinates: 27.89555556°N 108.68°E

Naming
- English translation: Mountain of the Pure Land of Brahma
- Language of name: Chinese

Geography
- Location within China
- Location: Tongren, Guizhou, China

UNESCO World Heritage Site
- Official name: Fanjingshan
- Type: Natural
- Criteria: (x)
- Designated: 2018 (42nd session)
- Reference no.: 1559
- Region: Eastern Asia
- Area: 40,275 ha
- Buffer Zone: 37,239 ha

The Fanjingshan (Chinese: 梵净山; pinyin: Fànjìngshān) or Mount Fanjing, located in Tongren, Guizhou province, is the highest peak of the Wuling Mountains in southeastern China, at an elevation of 2,570 m (8,430 ft). The Fanjingshan National Nature Reserve was established in 1978 and designated a UNESCO Biosphere Reserve in 1986. Fanjingshan is a sacred mountain in Chinese Buddhism, considered to be the bodhimaṇḍa of the Maitreya Buddha. It became a UNESCO World Heritage Site in 2018.

== Name ==
The mountain's name "Fanjing" is an abbreviation of Fantian Jingtu (梵天净土), or "Brahma's Pure Land". Fantian is the Chinese name for the Buddhist heavenly king Brahmā, and Jingtu is Chinese for "pure land", the focus of Pure Land Buddhism.

== Location and environment ==
Fanjingshan is located in Tongren, Guizhou Province in southeastern China. It is the highest peak of the Wuling Mountains. The elevation of its terrain ranges from 480 to 2,570 meters (1,570–8,430 ft) above sea level.

The Fanjingshan National Nature Reserve was established in 1978 and designated a UNESCO Biosphere Reserve in 1986. The reserve covers a total area of 567 km^{2} (219 sq mi) and is a conservation area for primitive vegetation of the mid sub-tropic alpine region of eastern China. The mountain was designated a World Heritage Site in July 2018.

Fanjingshan's relative isolation has ensured a high degree of biodiversity. Endemic species such as the rare Guizhou golden monkey (Rhinopithecus brelichi) and the Fanjingshan fir (Abies fanjingshanensis) occur only in a small region centering on Fanjingshan. Several endangered species, including the Chinese giant salamander, forest musk deer, and Reeve's pheasant are also found in Fanjingshan. It is also home to the largest and most contiguous subtropical primeval beech forest.

== Gallery ==
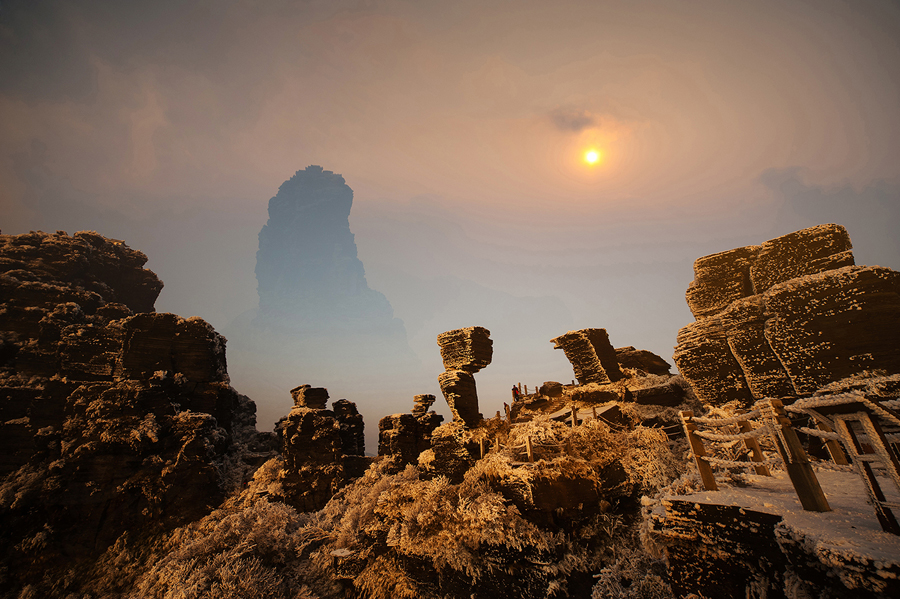
Fanjingshan

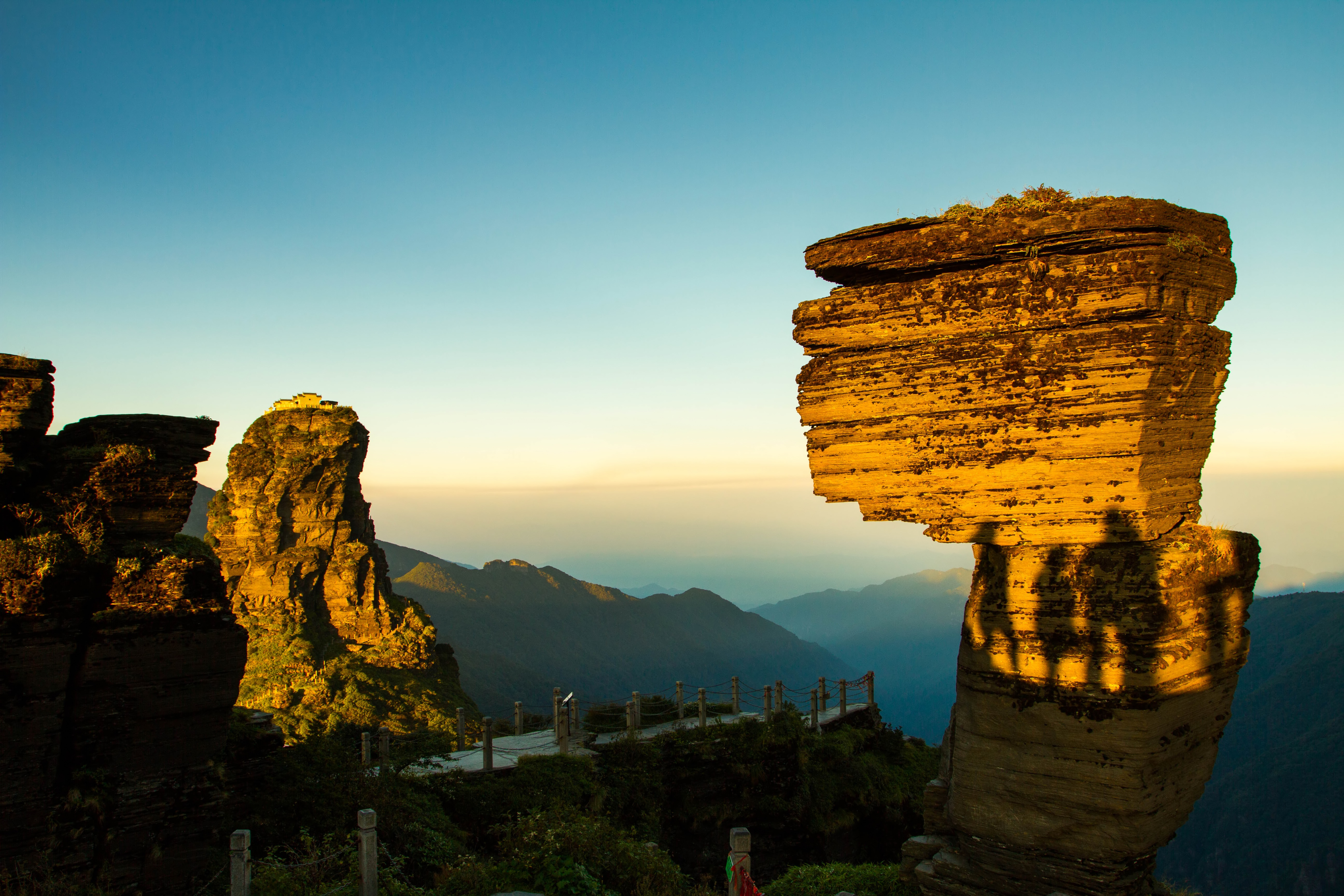
The Mushroom Rock

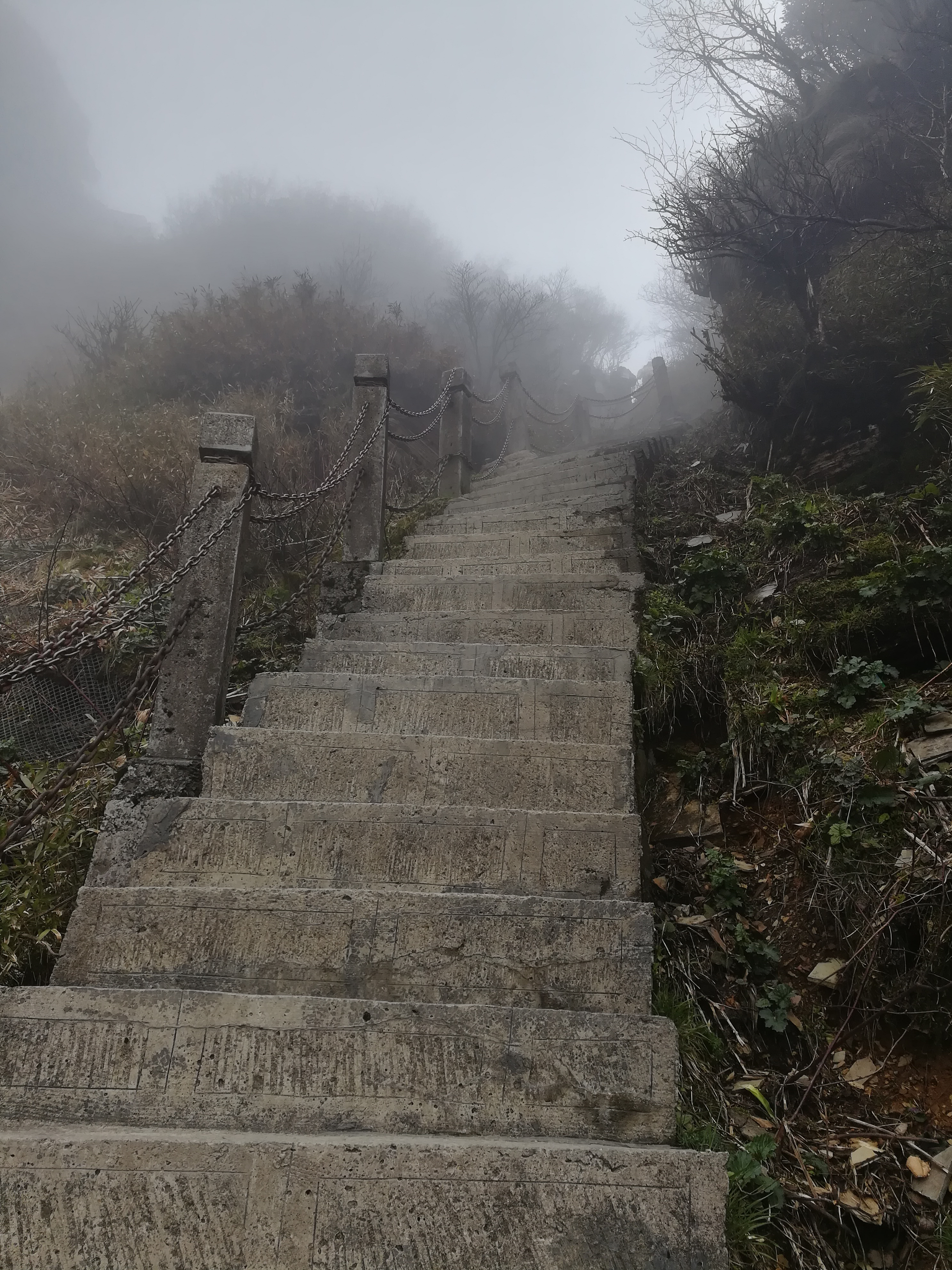
Stone Steps

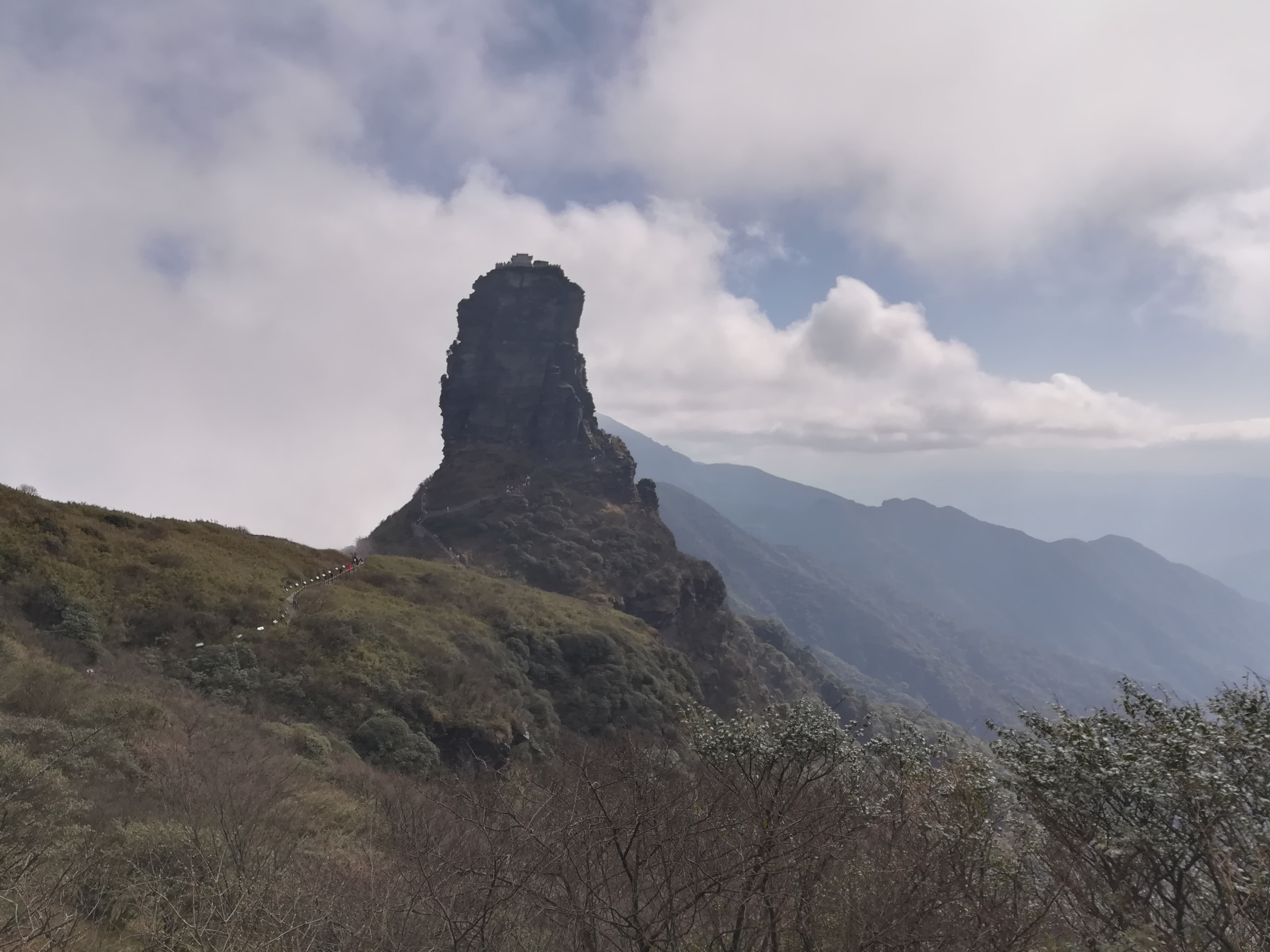
Jinding

== Buddhism ==
Fanjingshan is considered a sacred mountain of Chinese Buddhism, ranking just below the Four Sacred Mountains of Buddhism. It is considered the bodhimaṇḍa (or daochang)—a spot in which one reached enlightenment—of the Maitreya Buddha. The influence of Buddhism reached Fanjingshan by the Tang dynasty at the latest, especially after Hou Hongren (侯弘仁) constructed the Zangke Road (牂牁道) in 639 AD, which facilitated transport in the mountainous region, and local gazettes record the construction of several temples in the area. More temples were built during the ensuing Song and Yuan dynasties.

Buddhism greatly prospered during the Ming and Qing dynasties, when the cult of Tianguan Maitreya (天冠弥勒) became dominant in Fanjingshan. The Bozhou rebellion in the late 16th century caused great damages to Fanjingshan's temples. After suppressing the rebellion, the Wanli Emperor ordered the monk Miaoxuan (妙玄) to rebuild the Golden Peak and the Cheng'en Temple (承恩寺). Many other temples were constructed in the area, ushering in the golden era for Buddhism in Fanjingshan. Most temples during the Ming and Qing dynasties belonged to the Pure Land and the Linji sects of Buddhism.

In the turmoil that toppled the Qing dynasty, many temples were destroyed by marauding armies and bandits, and few monks remained in the Republic of China era. After further destructions during the Cultural Revolution, Buddhism has enjoyed a renaissance since the 1980s. Many old temples have been rebuilt and new ones constructed, including the Cheng'en Temple, Huguo Chan Temple (护国禅寺), Great Golden Buddha Temple (大金佛寺), and Longquan Temple (龙泉寺).

In 2010, the Fanjingshan Buddhist Cultural Park was opened, with a Golden Hall that houses a 5-metre-tall (16 ft) statue of the Maitreya Buddha made with 250 kg (550 lb) of gold and thousands of gems. It is said to be the largest gold Maitreya statue in the world.

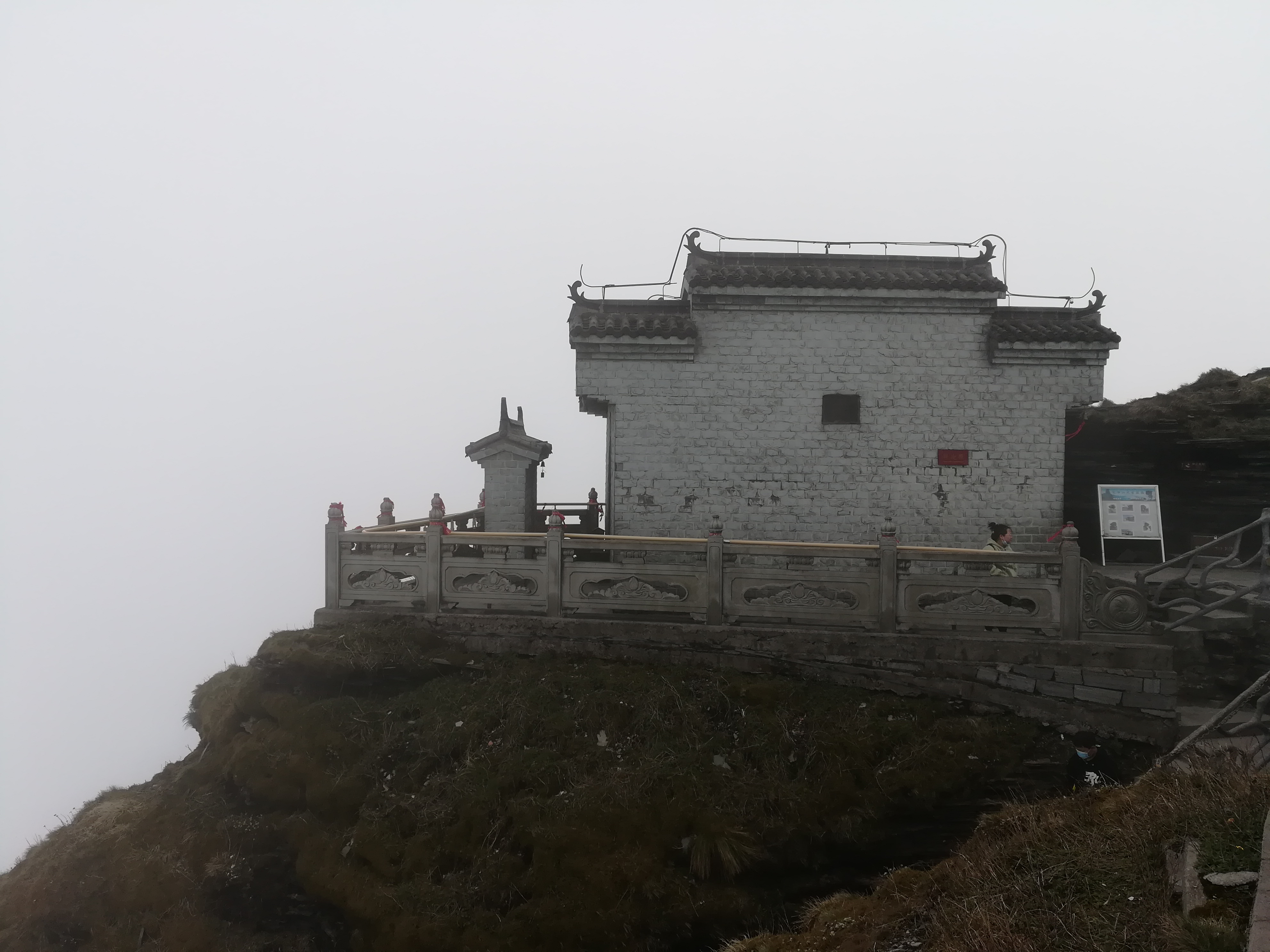
Buddhist temple on Red Clouds Golden Summit

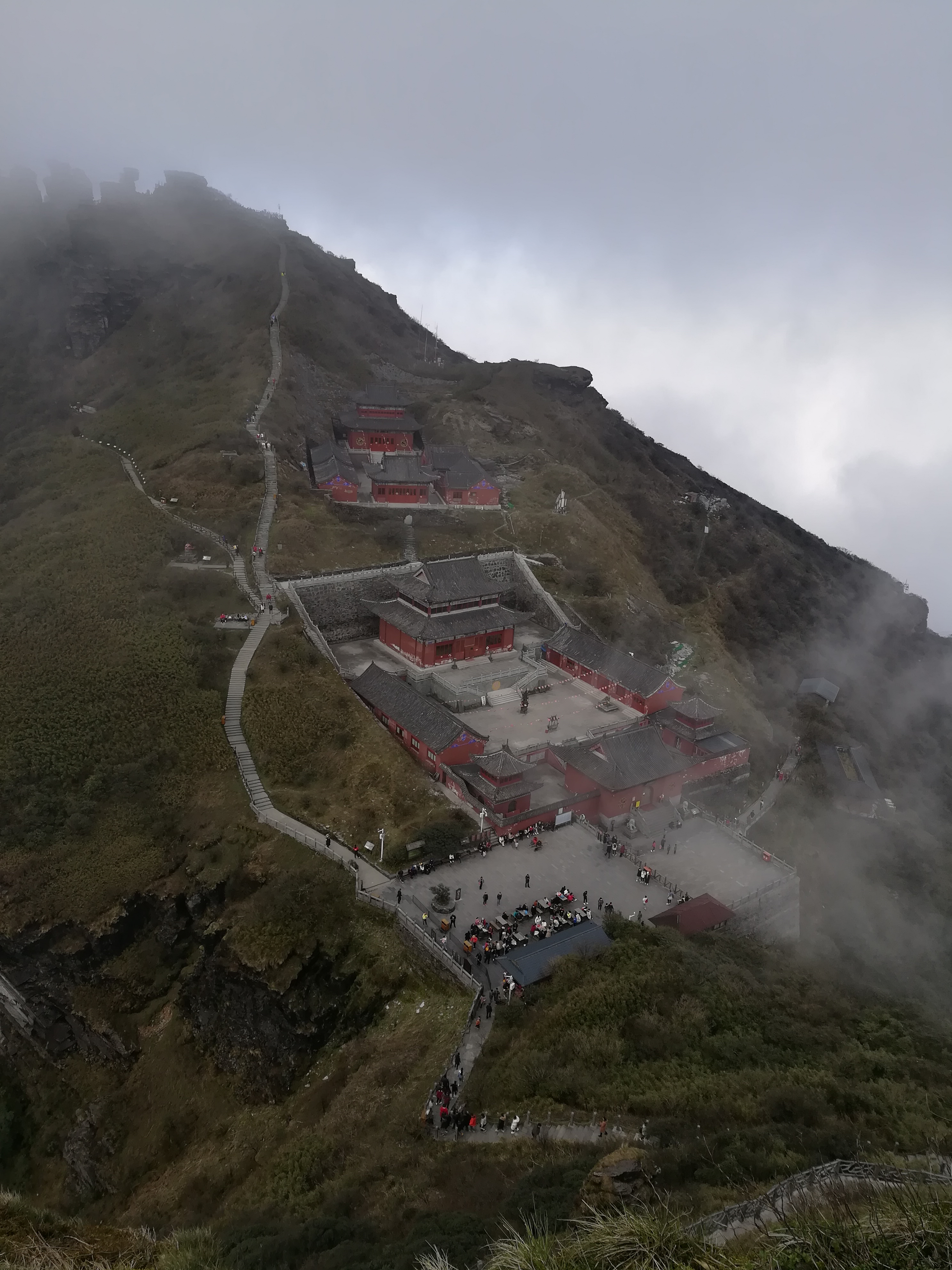
Cheng'en Temple from Mount Fanjing

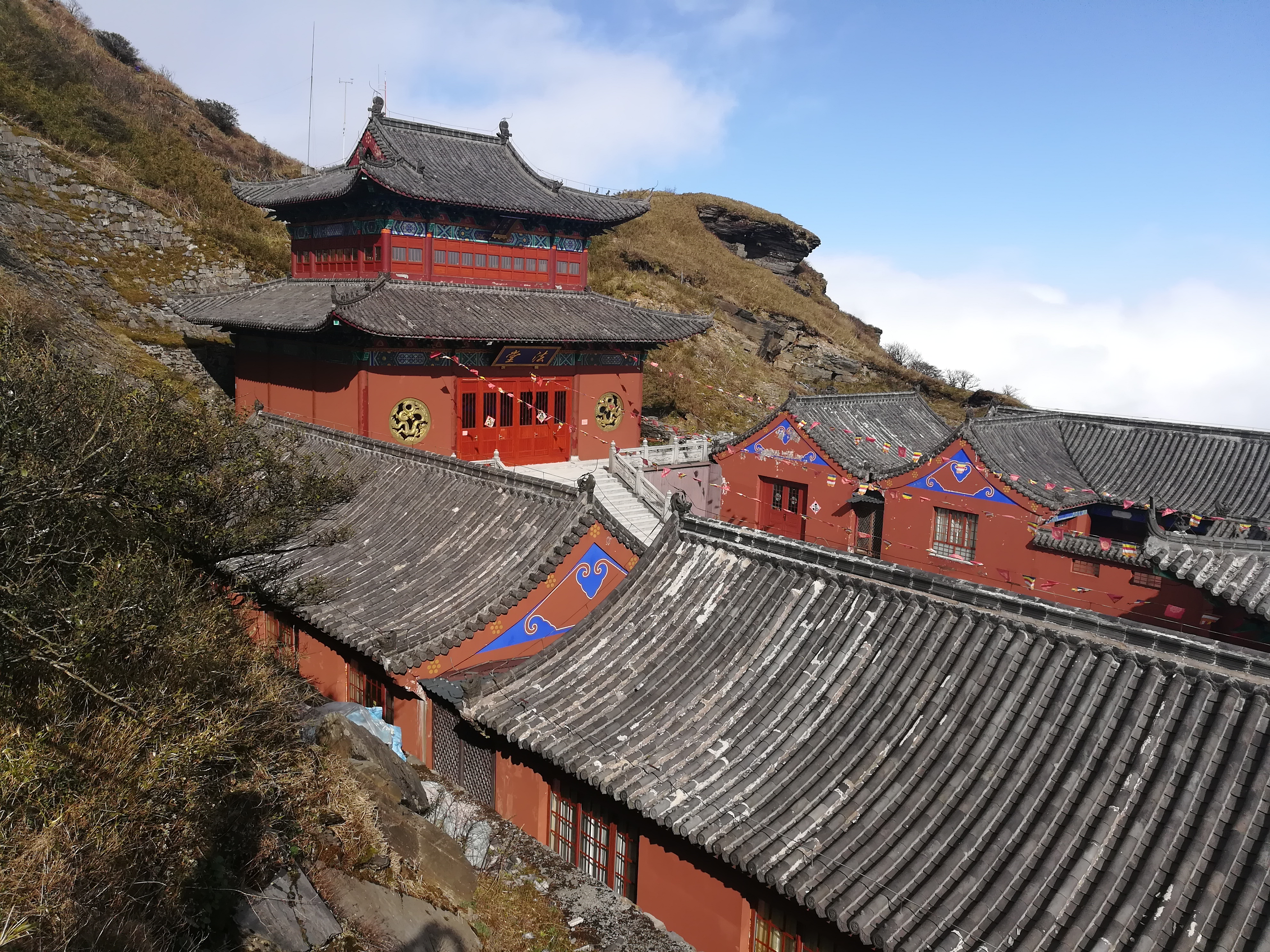
Dharma Hall, Cheng'en Temple

== Recognition ==
Asteroid 215021 Fanjingshan, discovered by astronomers of the PMO NEO Survey Program in 2005, was named after the World Heritage Site. The official naming citation was published by the Minor Planet Center on 8 November 2019 (M.P.C. 118221).

A genus (Fanjingshania) of fossil chondrichthyan discovered in Guizhou Province was named after Fanjingshan mountain.
