= Himalayan long-tailed myotis =

Scientific classification
- Kingdom: Animalia
- Phylum: Chordata
- Class: Mammalia
- Order: Chiroptera
- Family: Vespertilionidae
- Genus: Myotis
- Species: M. himalaicus

Binomial name
- Myotis himalaicus Saikia, Chakravarty, Csorba, Laskar & Ruedi, 2025

Species of bat

The Himalayan long-tailed myotis (Myotis himalaicus), is a species of bat in the family Vespertilionidae. It was formally described in 2025 from the high altitude Western Himalayas of Uttarakhand, India, based on museum specimens and live catches, echolocation call structure, and DNA evidence. The species belongs to the Myotis frater species complex.
