= Qionglai–Minshan conifer forests =

Ecoregion in Southwestern China

Qionglai-Minshan conifer forests
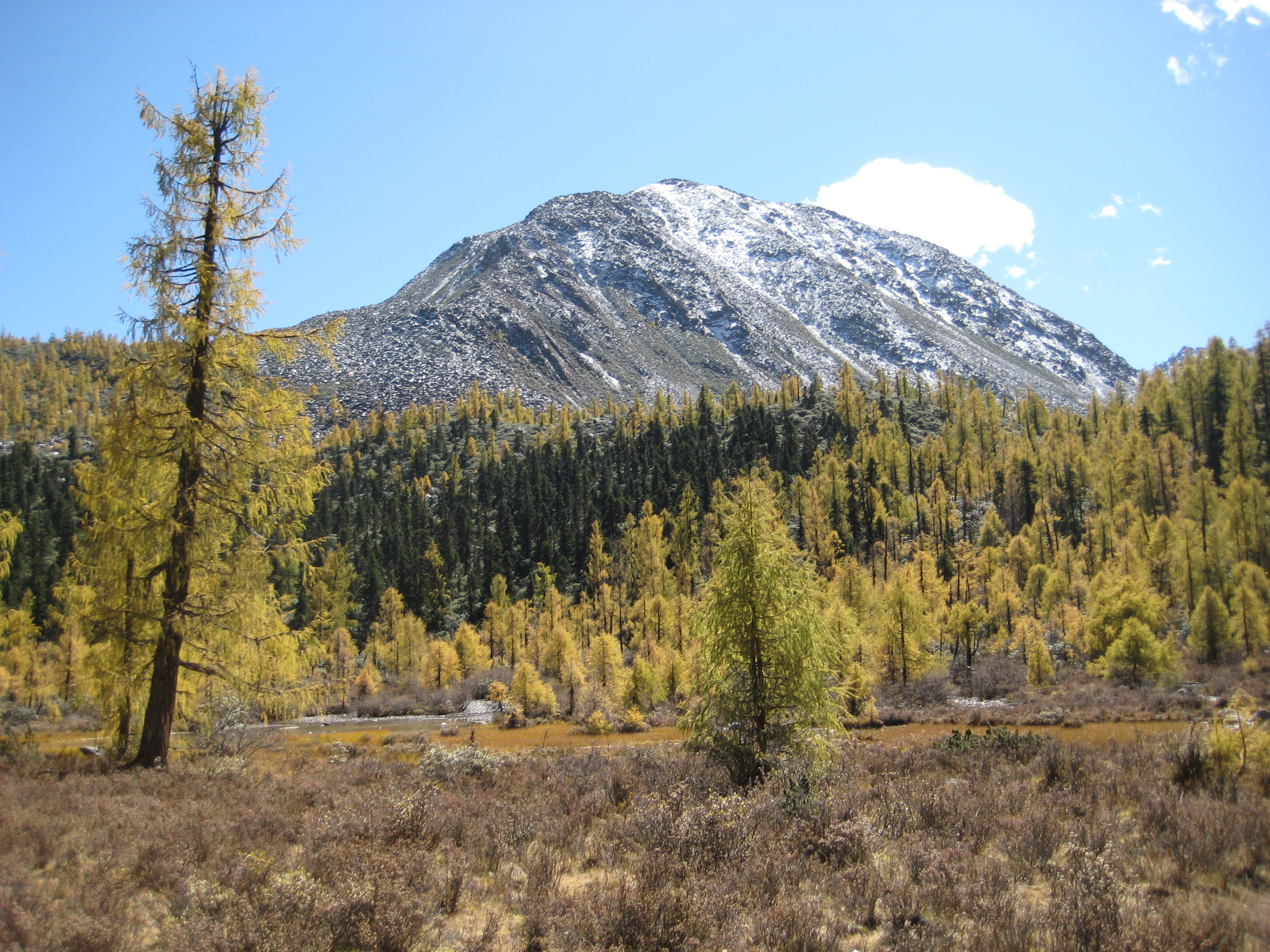
- Larches (Larix potaninii) in the Daxue Mountains of Danba County in autumn

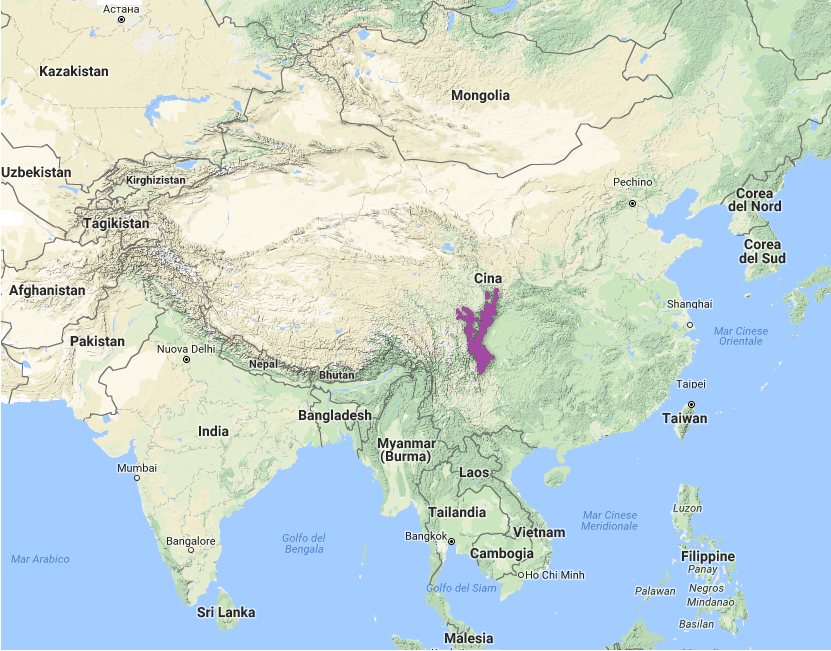
- Ecoregion territory (in purple)

Ecology
- Realm: Palearctic
- Biome: Temperate coniferous forests

Geography
- Country: China

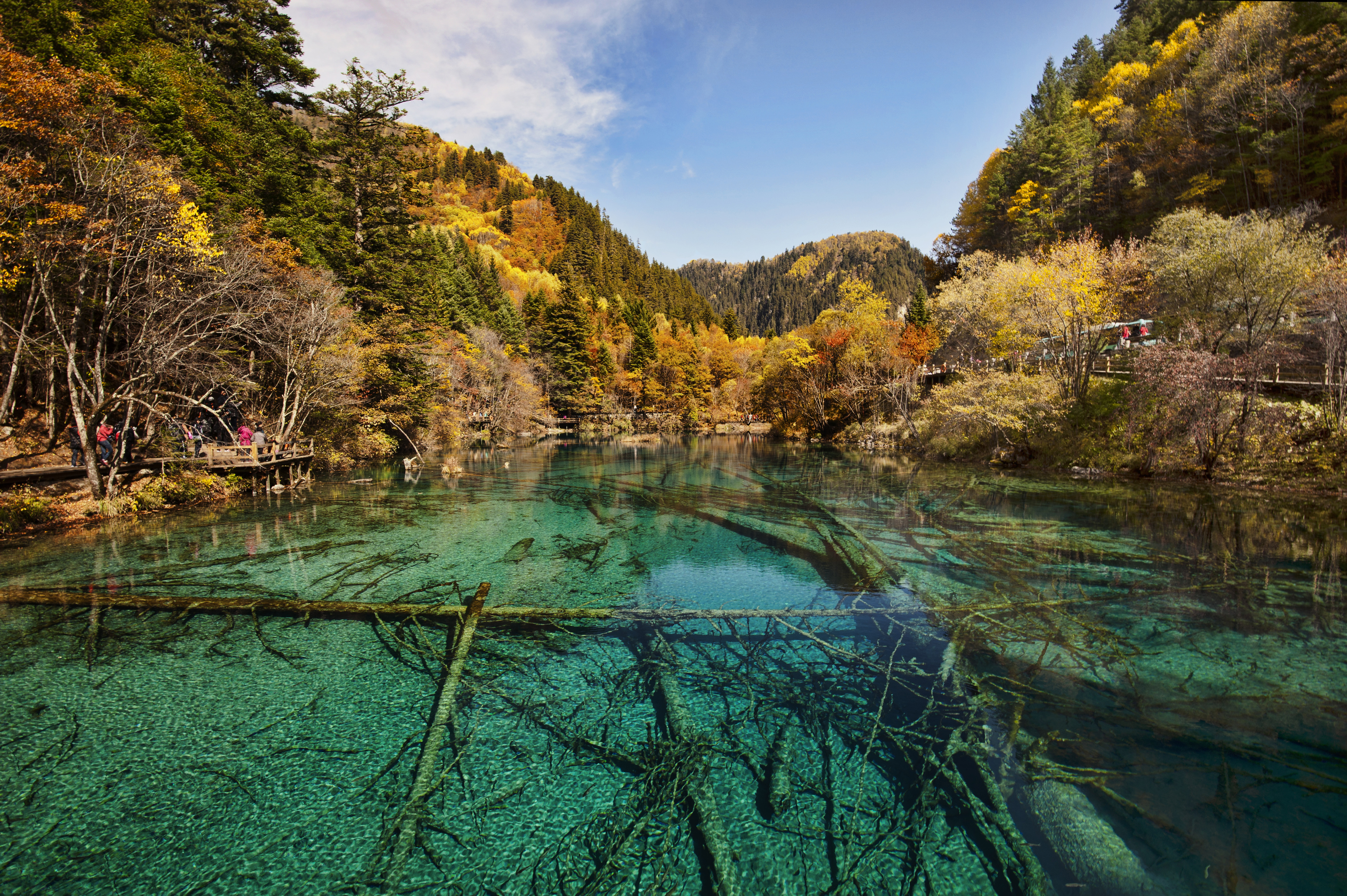
Conifer forests in Jiuzhaigou Valley

The Qionglai-Minshan conifer forests are a World Wide Fund for Nature ecoregion in Southwest China. These forests are classified as temperate coniferous forests and are part of the Palearctic realm.

== Geography ==
The forests cover the mountains along the easternmost edge of the Tibetan Plateau including the Min Mountains, Qionglai Mountains, Daxue Mountains, and Daliang Mountains. In addition to these mountain ranges, the lower reaches of the Dadu River valley support significant portions of the forests. The forests are found almost entirely within western Sichuan, but small portions can also be found in southern Gansu and extreme northeast Yunnan.

== Flora and fauna ==
The understories commonly feature bamboo. This ecoregion is one of the last remaining habitats where wild giant pandas can be found, alongside red pandas, clouded leopards, musk deer, Sichuan takin, and golden snub-nosed monkeys.

== Protected areas ==
Conservation areas and scenic spots include Wolong National Nature Reserve and Jiuzhaigou Valley.
