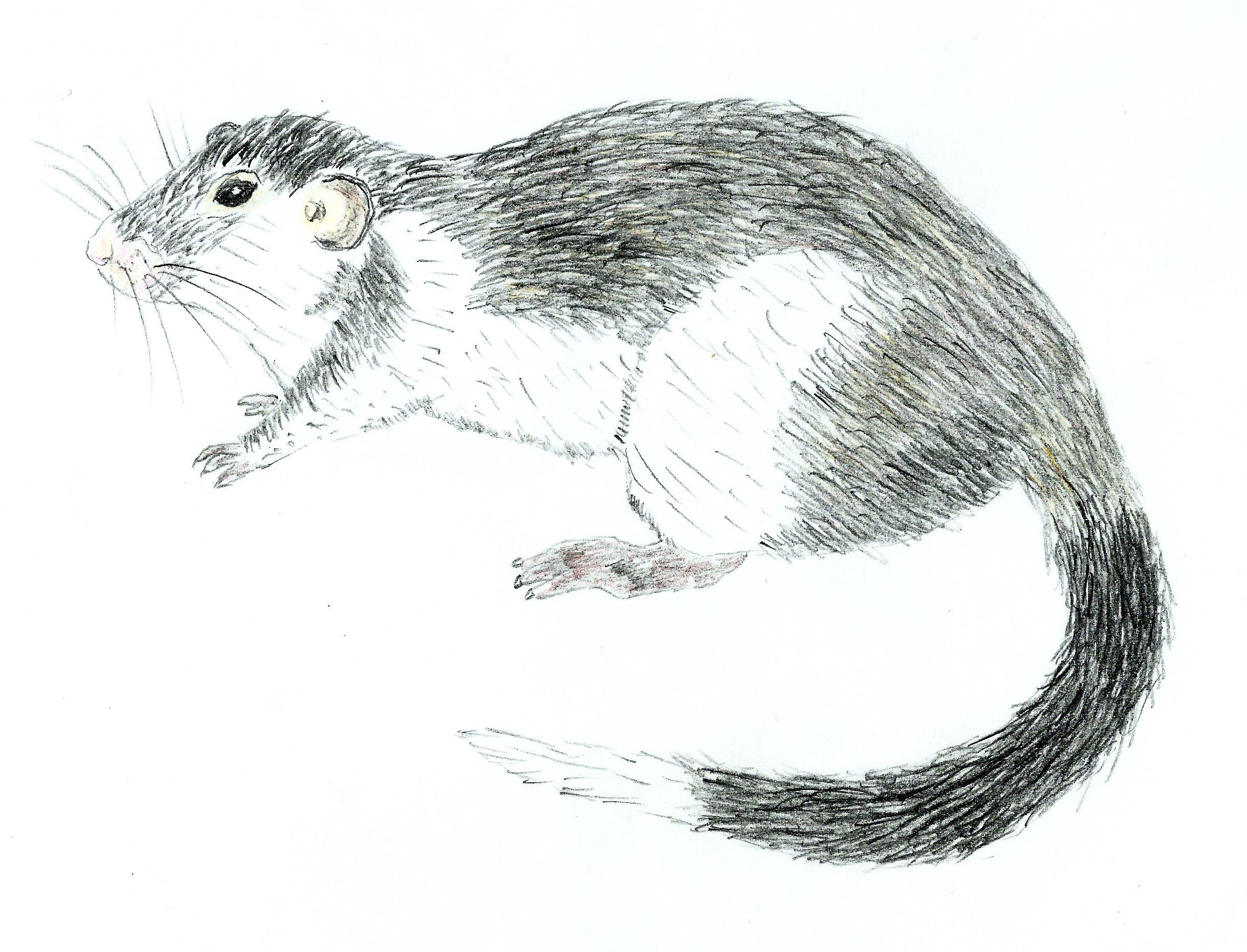

Conservation status
- Data Deficient (IUCN 3.1)

Scientific classification
- Kingdom: Animalia
- Phylum: Chordata
- Class: Mammalia
- Order: Rodentia
- Family: Muridae
- Genus: Crateromys
- Species: C. paulus

Binomial name
- Crateromys paulus Musser & Gordon, 1981
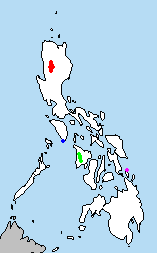
- Range in dark blue

= Ilin Island cloudrunner =

Species of rodent

The Ilin Island cloudrunner (Crateromys paulus) is a cloud rat known from a single specimen purchased on Ilin Island in the Philippines. It is called siyang by the Taubuwid Mangyan. It is a fluffy-coated, bushy-tailed rat and may have emerged from tree hollows at night to feed on fruits and leaves. The specimen, collected on 4 April 1953, was presented to the National Museum of Natural History in Washington D.C. The island's forests have been destroyed by human activity. The cloudrunner is among the 25 "most wanted lost" species that are the focus of Re:wild's "Search for Lost Species" initiative. As there is no proof that the single specimen originated on Ilin Island, searches are now focused on nearby Mindoro. Hope that it may be rediscovered have prompted IUCN to improve its status from possibly Extinct (EX?) in 1994 to Critically Endangered (CR) in 1996 before the current Data Deficient (DD) from 2008.
