= Wanglang National Nature Reserve =

National nature reserve in Sichuan, China

Coordinates: 32°56′N 104°03′E

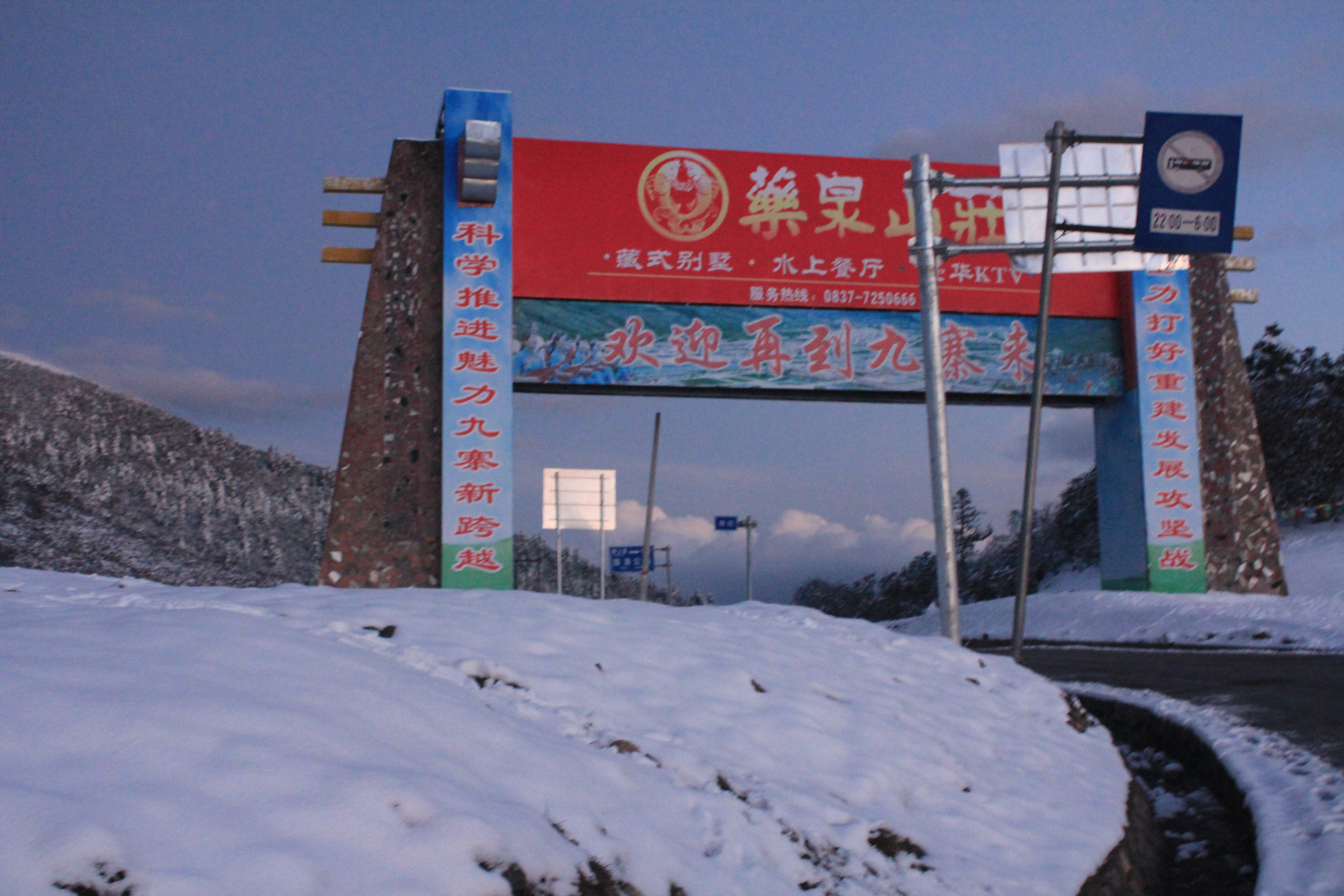
- Interactive map of Wanglang National Nature Reserve
- Location: Min Mountains, Hengduan Mountains, Pingwu County, Sichuan, China.

Wanglang National Nature Reserve is located in Pingwu County, Sichuan Province, China, on the northern slopes of the Hengduan Mountains in the Min Mountains, adjacent to Jiuzhaigou National Nature Reserve and Huanglong National Nature Reserve. It is an important component of the Min Mountains section of the Giant Panda National Park. Established in 1963, it covers an area of 32,297 hectares and is dedicated to the protection of the giant panda, golden snub-nosed monkey, Sichuan takin, Chinese monal, and other species.

The climate belongs to the Danba–Songpan semi-humid climate zone. Elevation ranges from 2,400 to 4,900 metres above sea level.

The reserve is home to 273 bird species across 16 orders, 77 mammal species across 7 orders, 9 amphibian species across 2 orders, and 13 reptile species across 2 orders.
