= Mount Wood (Occidental Mindoro) =

- Location within Philippines

Highest point
- Elevation: 2,024 m (6,640 ft)
- Coordinates: 12°44′43″N 121°12′33″E

Geography
- Location: Philippines

Mount Wood is a mountain in the Philippines. It is located in Occidental Mindoro and the Mimaropa region, in the north of the country, 210 km south of the national capital Manila.
