= Small-toothed mole =

Conservation status
- Near Threatened (IUCN 3.1)

Scientific classification
- Kingdom: Animalia
- Phylum: Chordata
- Class: Mammalia
- Order: Eulipotyphla
- Family: Talpidae
- Genus: Euroscaptor
- Species: E. parvidens

Binomial name
- Euroscaptor parvidens Miller, 1940
- Small-toothed mole range

Species of mammal

The small-toothed mole (Euroscaptor parvidens) is a species of mammal in the family Talpidae. It is found in Di Linh, in southern Vietnam, and Rakho near the border of Vietnam and China, and in southern Yunnan, China, near the Vietnamese border. It is likely that it has a broader distribution, especially in places between the currently known locations.

The small-tooth moles live underground in tunnels. These tunnels are interconnected and complex. The tunnels provide shelter as well as a way to get food. Small-tooth moles eat mostly earthworms and insect larvae. The tunnels create a trap for these two kinds of food for the small-tooth mole. Mostly, these moles do not live in deteriorating habitats like the small-tooth mole, which sets it apart from other moles.

The population estimate of the small-tooth mole is unknown. It was classified in 1996 as critically endangered on the list of IUCN Red List of Threatened Species, but is now considered data deficient. The small-tooth mole is potentially endangered because the required habitat that the animal lives in has quickly deteriorated, grown smaller and remains threatened. The area that small-tooth moles occupy is already limited, without deteriorating land conditions. At this time, there are no measure of conservation in place. In 1990 there was a plan recommended to have field surveyors determine the status of the species of the small-tooth mole, named the IUCN/SSC Eurasian Insectivores and Tree Shrews Action Plan. The studies were inconclusive.
