= San Miguel Department, Corrientes =

San Miguel Department Departamento San Miguel (Spanish) Tetãvore Sán Miguél (Guarani)
- Department
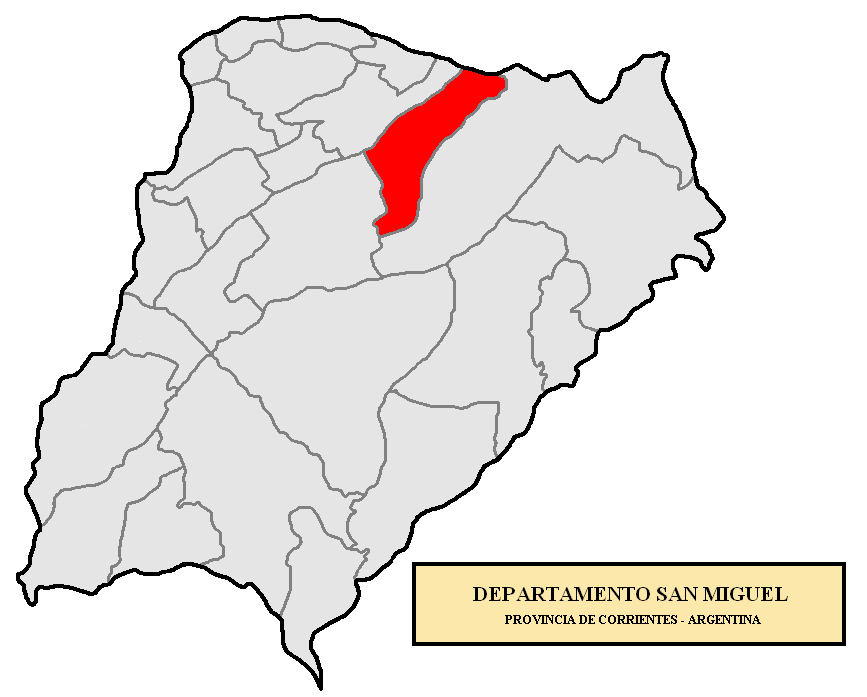
- location of San Miguel Department in Corrientes Province
- Coordinates: 28°00′S 57°36′W
- Country: Argentina
- Seat: San Miguel

Area
  - Total: 2,863 km^{2} (1,105 sq mi)

Population (2001 census [INDEC])
  - Total: 10,252
  - Density: 3.581/km^{2} (9.274/sq mi)
- Postal Code: W3485
- Area Code: 03781

San Miguel Department is a department of Corrientes Province in Argentina.

The provincial subdivision has a population of about 10,252 inhabitants in an area of 2,863 km^{2} (1,105 sq mi), and its capital city is San Miguel.

== Settlements ==
- Loreto
- San Miguel
- San Roque
