= Mount Iba =

Mountain in Tarlac, Philippines

- Location within Luzon Location within Philippines

Highest point
- Elevation: 1,605 m (5,266 ft)
- Prominence: 270 m (890 ft)
- Listing: Mountains in the Philippines
- Coordinates: 15°21′50″N 120°10′07″E

Geography
- Country: Philippines
- Region: Central Luzon
- Province: Zambales, Tarlac
- Municipality: San Jose, Tarlac
- Parent range: Zambales Mountains

Mount Iba is the second-tallest mountain in the Zambales Mountains and the highest point in the province of Tarlac, Philippines. It is located in municipality of San Jose, Tarlac. Water from the mountain drains to the Agno River. With an elevation of 1,605 metres (5,266 ft), between Mount Tapulao (2,037m) and Mount Negron (1,583m).
