= Zambales Mountains =

Mountain range in Luzon

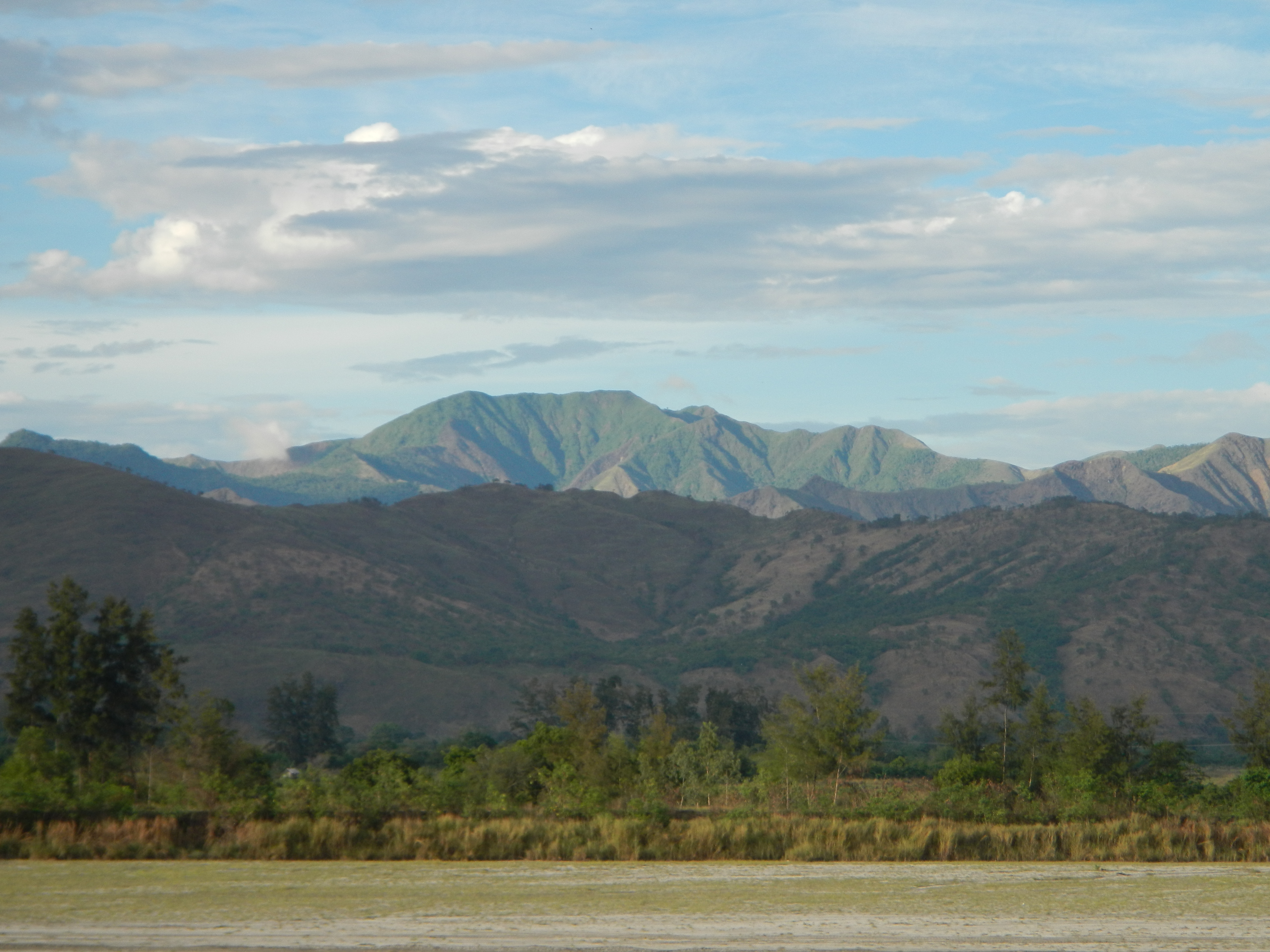
- The mountain range seen from San Narciso, Zambales

Highest point
- Peak: Mount Tapulao (aka High Peak), Zambales
- Elevation: 2,037 m (6,683 ft)
- Coordinates: 15°28′51″N 120°7′16″E

Dimensions
- Length: 180 km (110 mi) N-S

Geography
- Zambales Mountains topographic map
- Country: Philippines
- Provinces: Zambales; Pangasinan; Bataan; Tarlac; Pampanga
- Region: Central Luzon & Ilocos Region
- Range coordinates: 15°41′N 120°05′E

The Zambales Mountains is a mountain range in western Luzon. The mountains spread along a north-south axis, separating Luzon's central plain from the South China Sea. The range extends into five provinces: Zambales, Pangasinan, Tarlac, Pampanga, and Bataan. One of its most prominent sections is known as the Cabusilan Mountain Range composed of Mount Pinatubo, Mount Negron and Mount Cuadrado, which are believed to be remnants of the ancestral Pinatubo peak. The highest elevation in the Zambales Mountains is Mount Tapulao, also known as High Peak, in Zambales province which rises to 2,037 metres (6,683 ft).

== Extent ==
The Zambales Mountains has an area of 300 square kilometres (120 sq mi) extending North to South from the mountains of western Pangasinan province, the whole length of Zambales, to tip of the Bataan Peninsula in the south enclosing Manila Bay. The mountain range also encompasses the mountains in the municipalities of Bamban, Capas, San Jose, San Clemente, Mayantoc, Santa Ignacia, Camiling in the province of Tarlac. In Pampanga, it includes the mountains in Floridablanca, Porac, Angeles City and Mabalacat.

== Geology ==
The Zambales Mountains include Jurassic to Miocene ophiolite massifs, overlain by more recent sedimentary formation, including the Cagaluan Formation and the Santa Cruz Formation.

== Volcanoes ==
Although the mountains are volcanic in origin, Mount Pinatubo is the only active volcano in the mountain range. Its eruption on June 15, 1991 was the second most powerful volcanic eruption of the 20th century after the 1912 eruption of Novarupta in Alaska. The volcanic eruption, which was complicated by the arrival of Typhoon Yunya, covered the region with thick volcanic ash and lahar including the U.S. military base at Clark Field near Angeles City.

Other volcanoes in Zambales Mountains are Mount Mariveles, Mount Natib and Mount Samat.

== Protected areas ==
- Bataan National Park
- Manleluag Spring Protected Landscape
- Roosevelt Protected Landscape

== Peaks ==
=== List of highest peaks ===
- Mount Tapulao 6,683 ft (2,037 m)
- Mount Iba 5,430 ft (1,655 m)
- Mount Negron 5,194 ft (1,583 m)
- Mount Pinatubo 4,875 ft (1,486 m)
- Mount Mariveles 4,554 ft (1,388 m)
- Mount Cuadrado 4,344 ft (1,324 m)
- Mount McDonald 4,334 ft (1,321 m)
- Mount Natib 4,111 ft (1,253 m)
- Mount Limay 2,984 ft (910 m)
- Mount Dorst 2,785 ft (849 m)
- Mount Samat 1,788 ft (545 m)
- Mount Gates 1,663 ft (507 m)

== River system ==
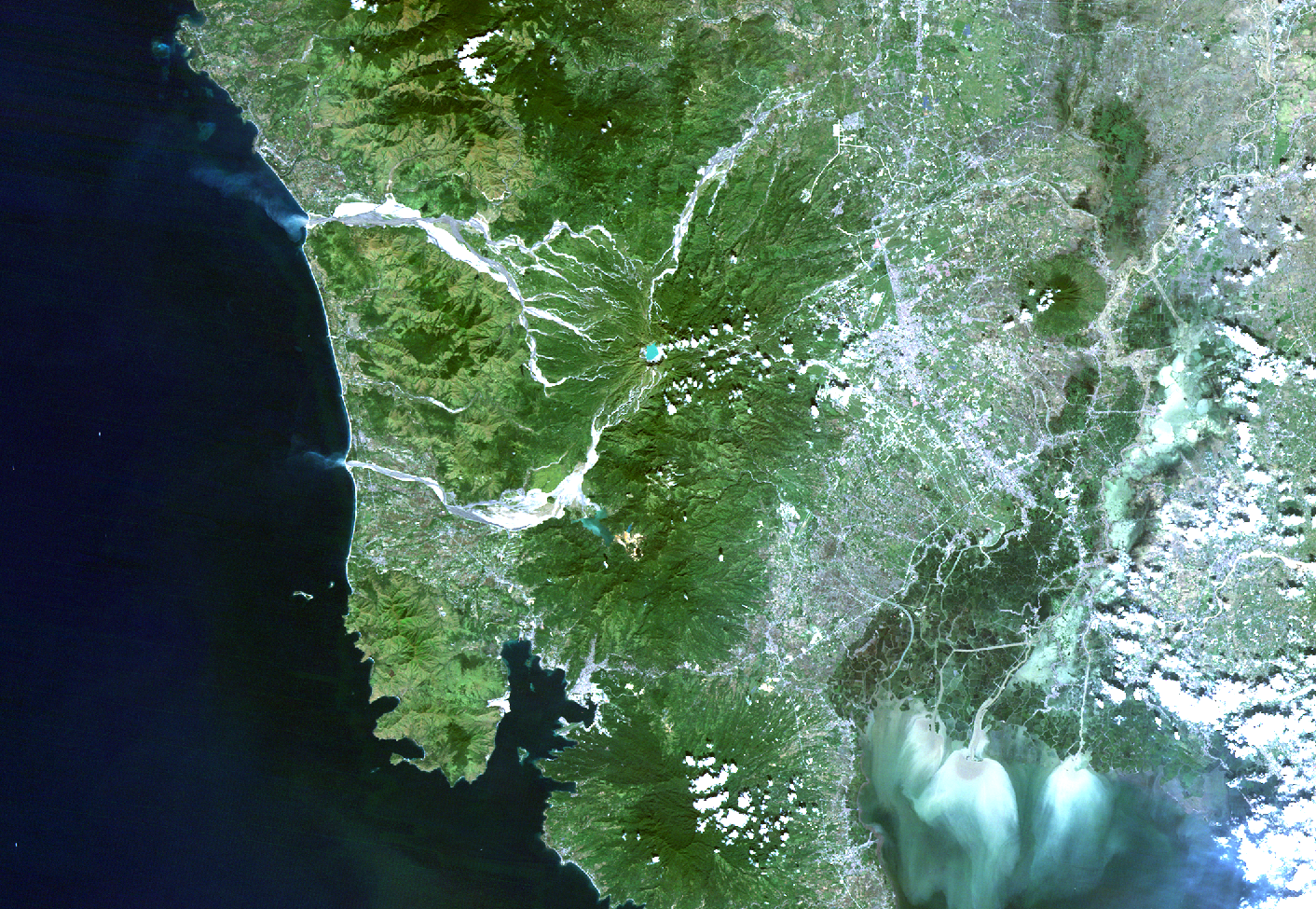
Satellite image of the central portion of the range taken on November 19, 2020. Strikingly visible are the lahar-filled river valleys radiating from the cyan Mount Pinatubo crater lake.

List of rivers in Zambales Mountains by length.

- Tarlac River 95.2 km (59.2 mi)
- Camiling River 93 km (58 mi)
- Pasig–Potrero River 75 km (47 mi)
- Bucao River 48.3 km (30.0 mi)
- Santo Tomas River 46.4 km (28.8 mi)

== Deforestation ==
The Zambales mountains have undergone immense deforestation due to excessive logging and swidden farming. The 1991 eruption of Mount Pinatubo also devastated large areas of the range, mostly ancestral lands of the indigenous Aetas in Zambales. Reforestation efforts have had success in some barren parts of the range, notably in San Felipe, Zambales at the initiative of the Aeta people supported by MAD Travel and some government agencies.

== Biodiversity ==
=== Mammals ===
The Zamabales forest mouse (Apomys zambalensis) is a species of small rodent endemic to Zambales Mountains in the Philippines.

The Tapulao forest mouse (Apomys brownorum) is a species of small rodent endemic to Mount Tapulao in the Philippines.

The Pinatubo forest mouse (Apomys sacobianus) is a species of small rodent endemic to Mount Pinatubo in the Philippines.

The Tapulao tweezer-beaked rat (Rhynchomys tapulao) is a species of small rodent endemic to Mount Tapulao in the Philippines.

== Gallery ==
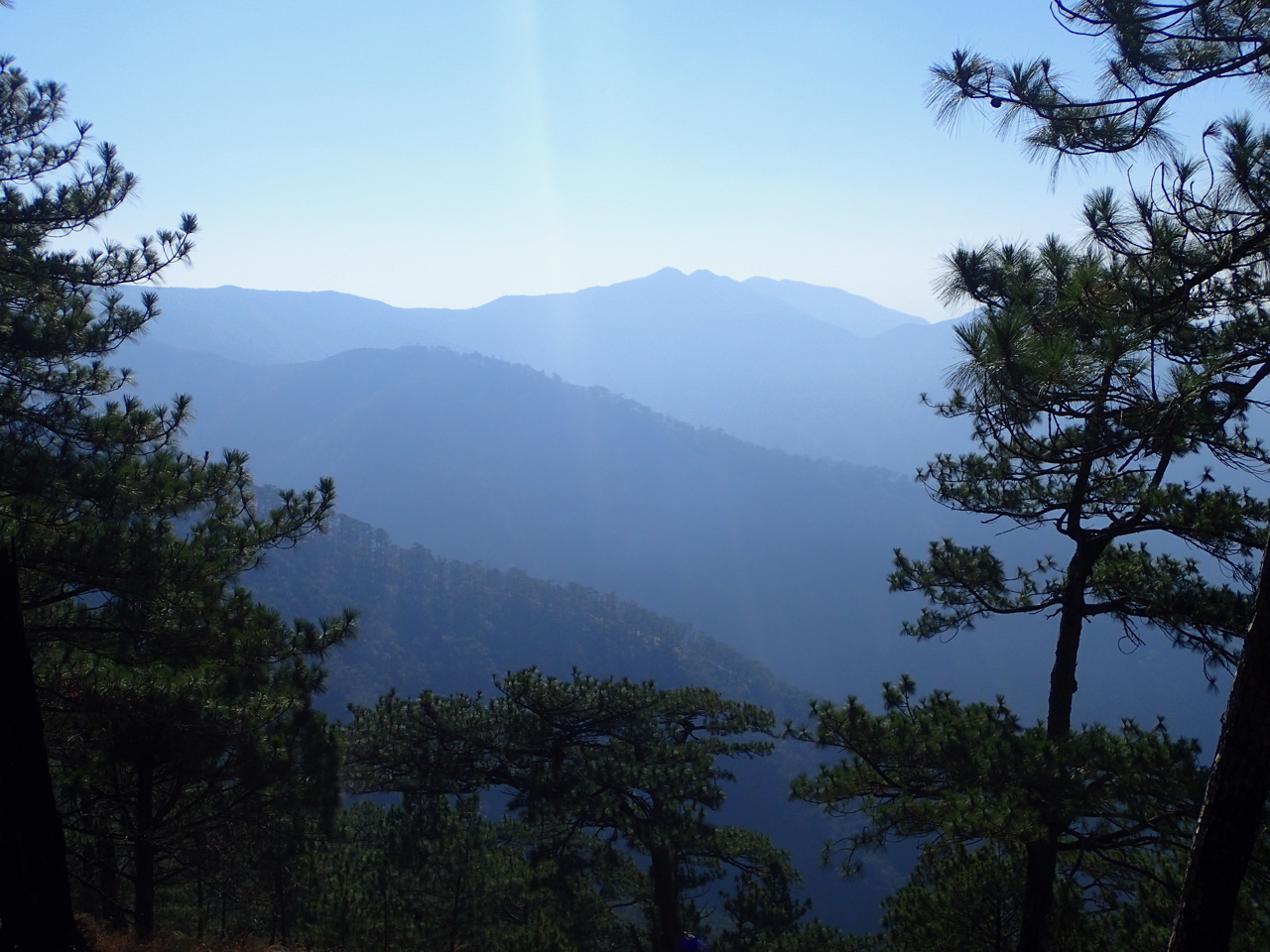
The Zambales Mountains is known for having pine trees, Pinus merkusii.

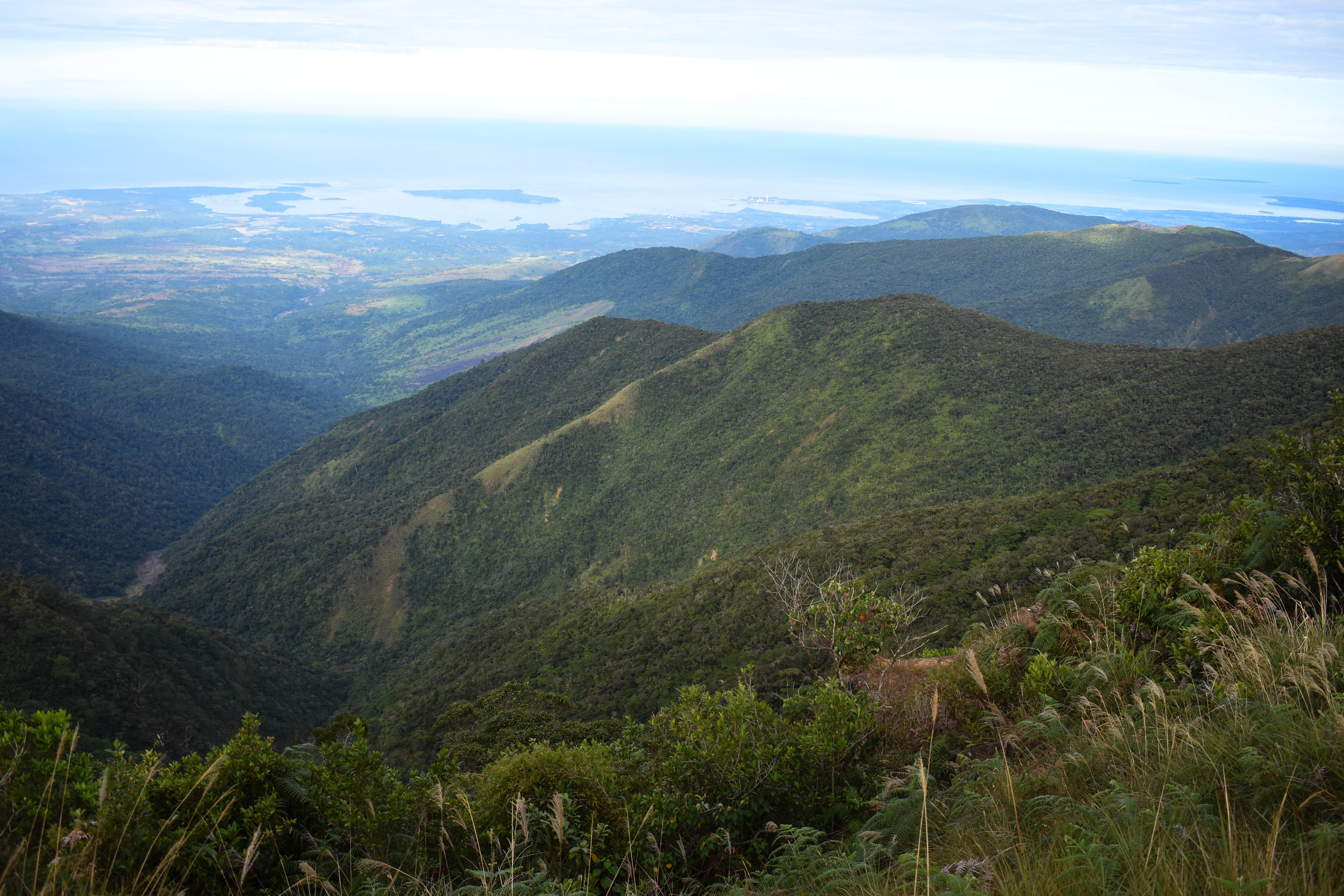
View from Mt. Tapulao overlooking the South China Sea in the distance

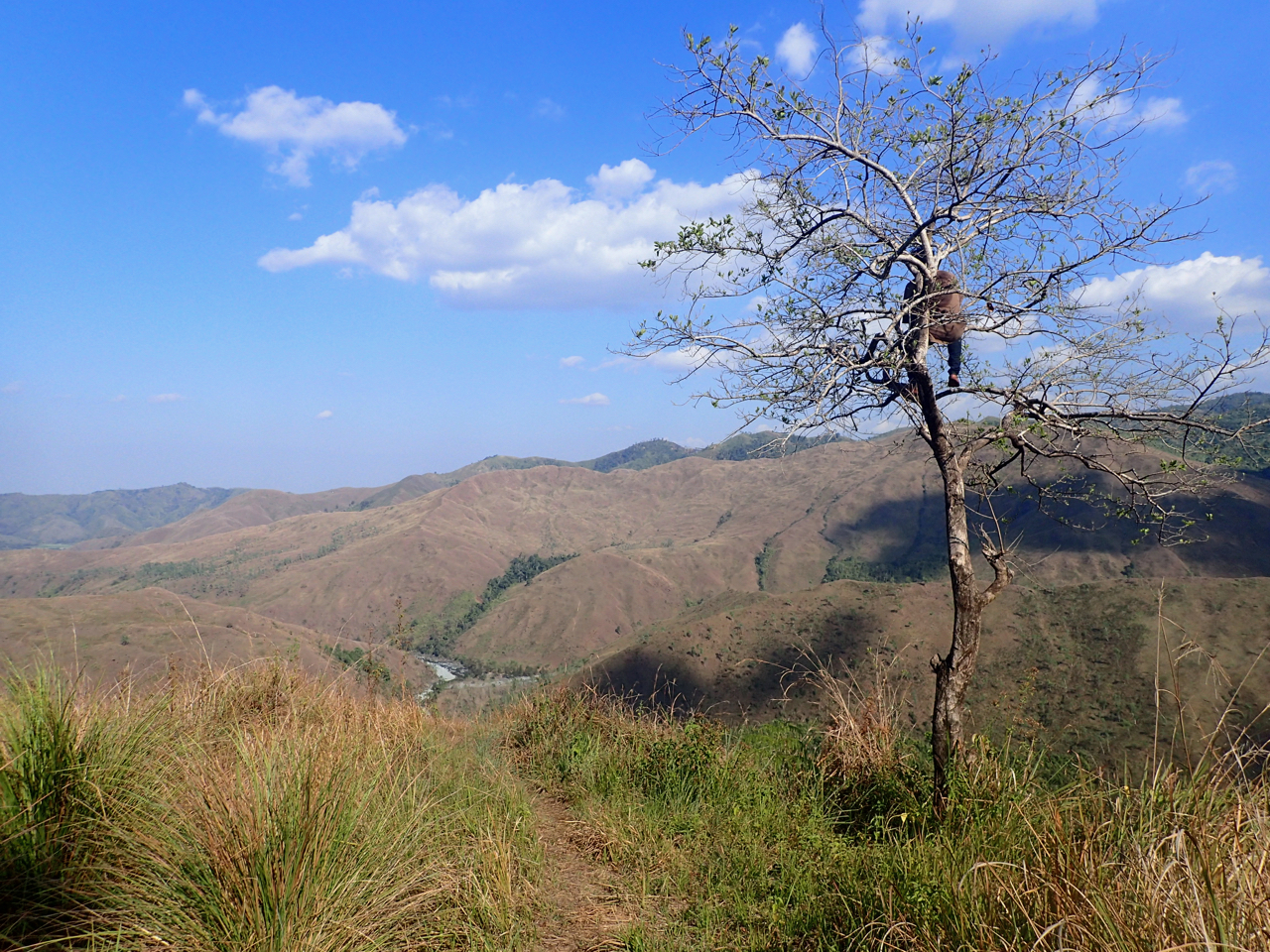
Mountainous barren landscape around the Camiling River watershed, Tarlac province

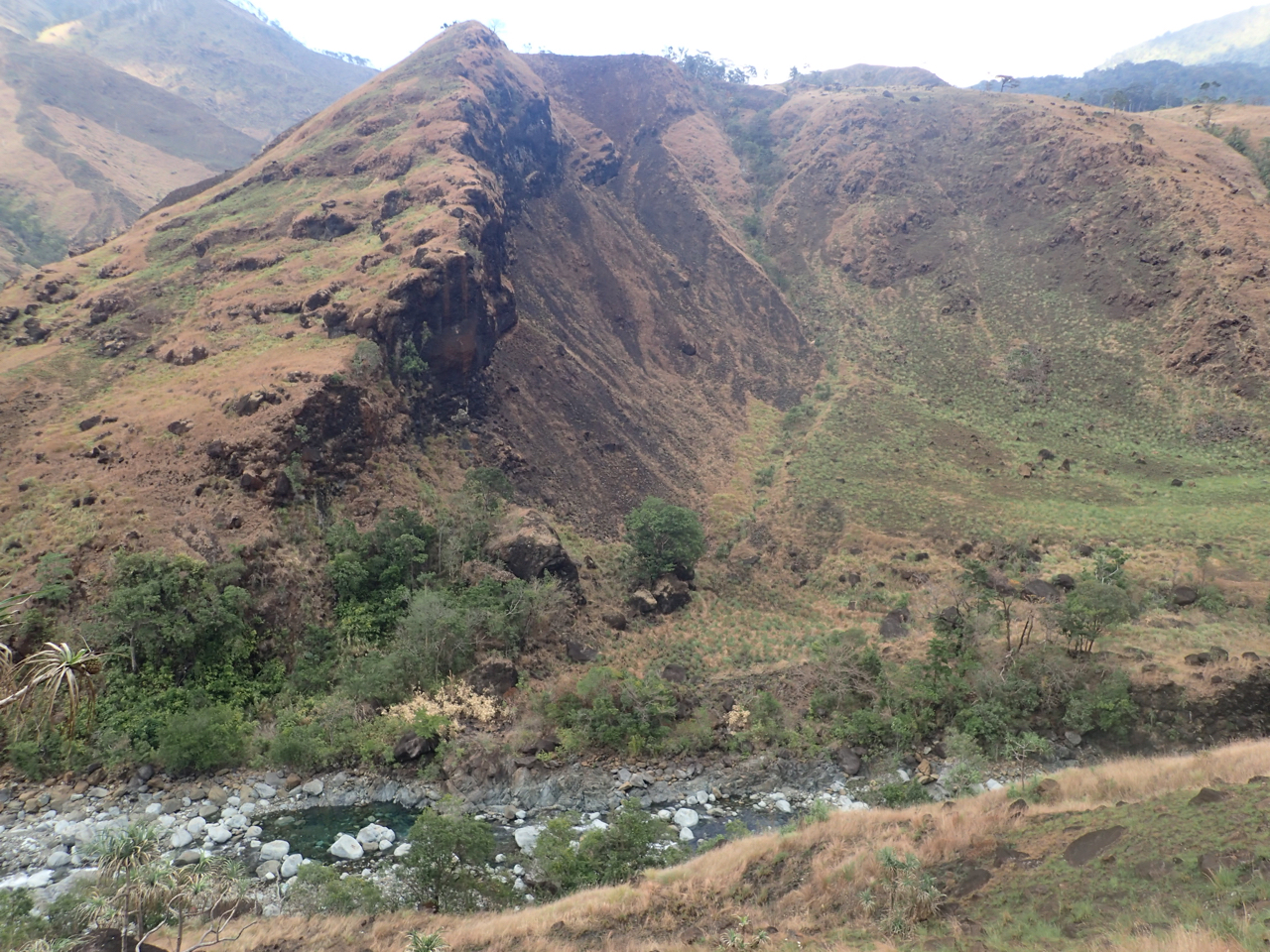
Upper Lawis River watershed, showing a jagged ridge

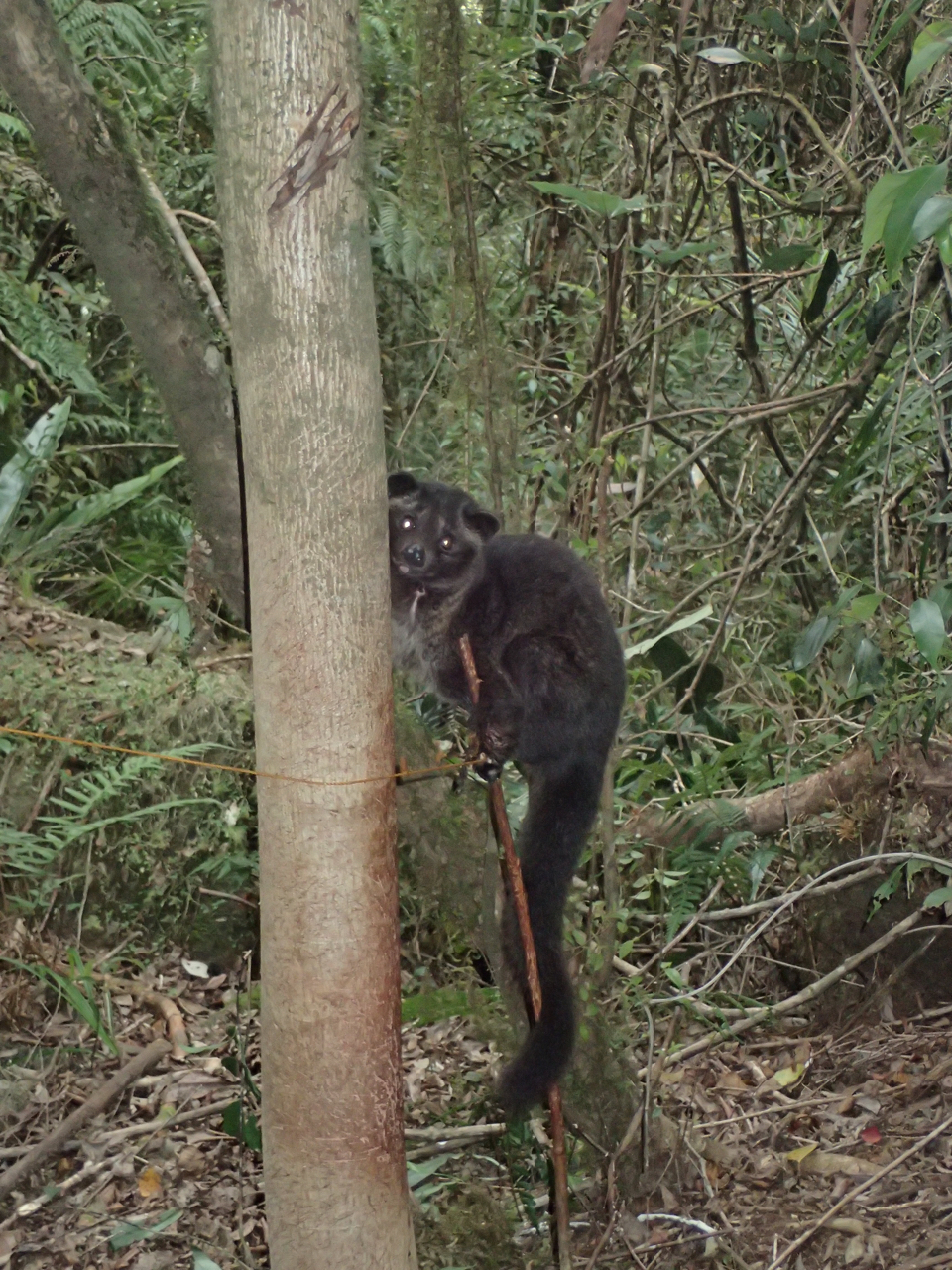
A trapped civet in the Zambales Mountains that was later released

== See also ==
- Geography of the Philippines
