= Mount Tapulao =

Highest peak of the Zambales Mountains, Philippines

- High Peak
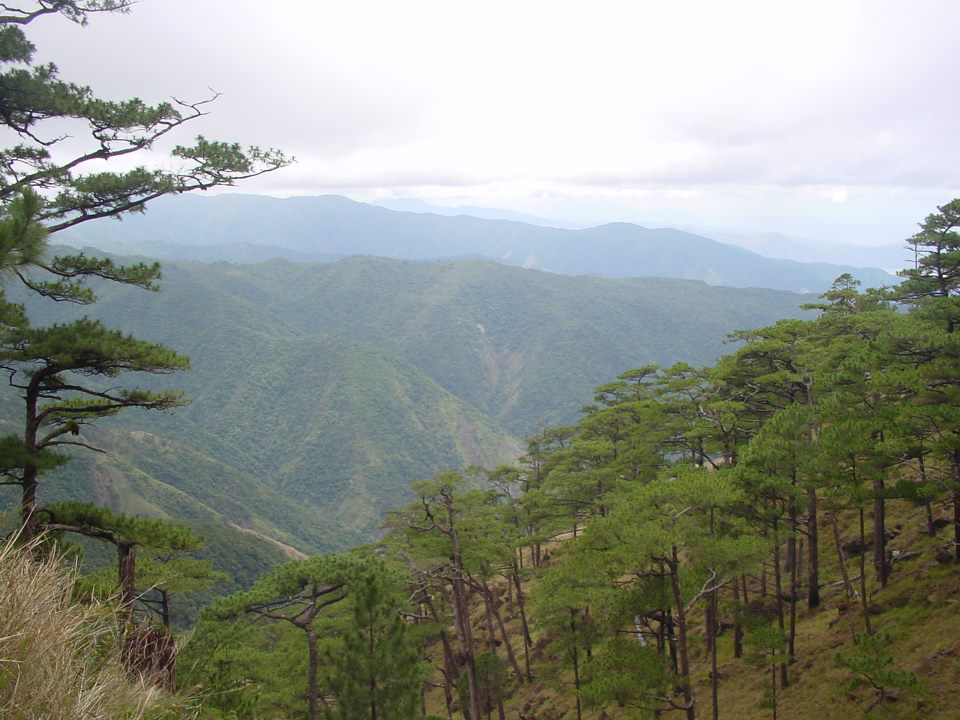
- Pine forest of Mount Tapulao

Highest point
- Elevation: 2,044 m (6,706 ft)
- Prominence: 2,020 m (6,630 ft)
- Listing: Ultra; Ribu
- Coordinates: 15°28′51″N 120°7′16″E

Geography
- Location within Luzon Location within Philippines
- Location: Luzon
- Country: Philippines
- Region: Central Luzon
- Province: Zambales
- Municipality: Palauig
- Parent range: Zambales Mountains

Climbing
- Easiest route: Dampay Resettlement Area, Brgy. Salaza, Palauig
- 150px Topographic map

Mount Tapulao (also known as High Peak) is the highest mountain in the Zambales Mountain Range and in the province of Zambales in the Philippines. The peak, which rises to an elevation of 2,044 metres (6,706 ft) above sea level, is located in the municipality of Palauig, Zambales. Its name is derived from the abundance of Sumatran Pine trees in the area, known in Zambal as tapolaw.

The mountain was once a site of a large-scale chromite mining operations. The destruction of the beautiful natural scenery is visible in the mine pits on the summit as well as other related structures along the trail. The summit offers a 360-degree vista from where you can see the other Zambales mountains on the eastern side, Lingayen Gulf to the north, and on the western side, the Zambales lowlands and the South China Sea stretching to as far south as Pundaquit in San Antonio, Zambales.

== Hiking activity ==
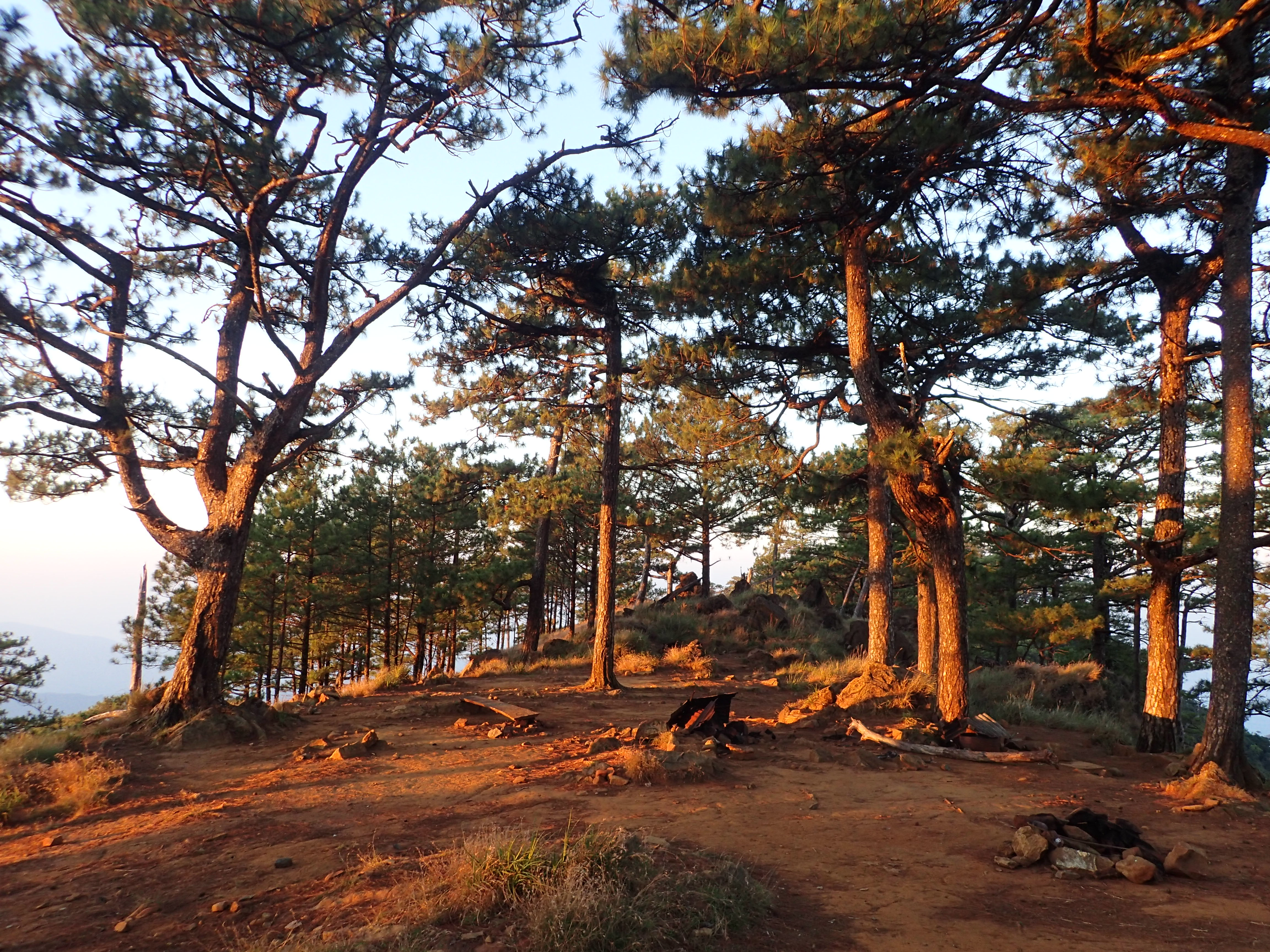
Pine forest campsite

The trail to the top of Mount Tapulao is on rolling and gradual terrain that takes hikers through a number of distinct ecosystems: from lowland grass and scrubland dominated by talahib (cogon grass) to its flanks of secondary to primary dipterocarp forest, mossy montane forest and pine forest above 1,800 metres (5,900 ft) that extends to the adjacent mountains.

During wet weather, limatik or forest leeches abound especially near the streams along the way. Parts of the trail become rivulets that trekkers easily attract these critters without noticing being bitten, sticking on the human skin.

=== From Palauig ===
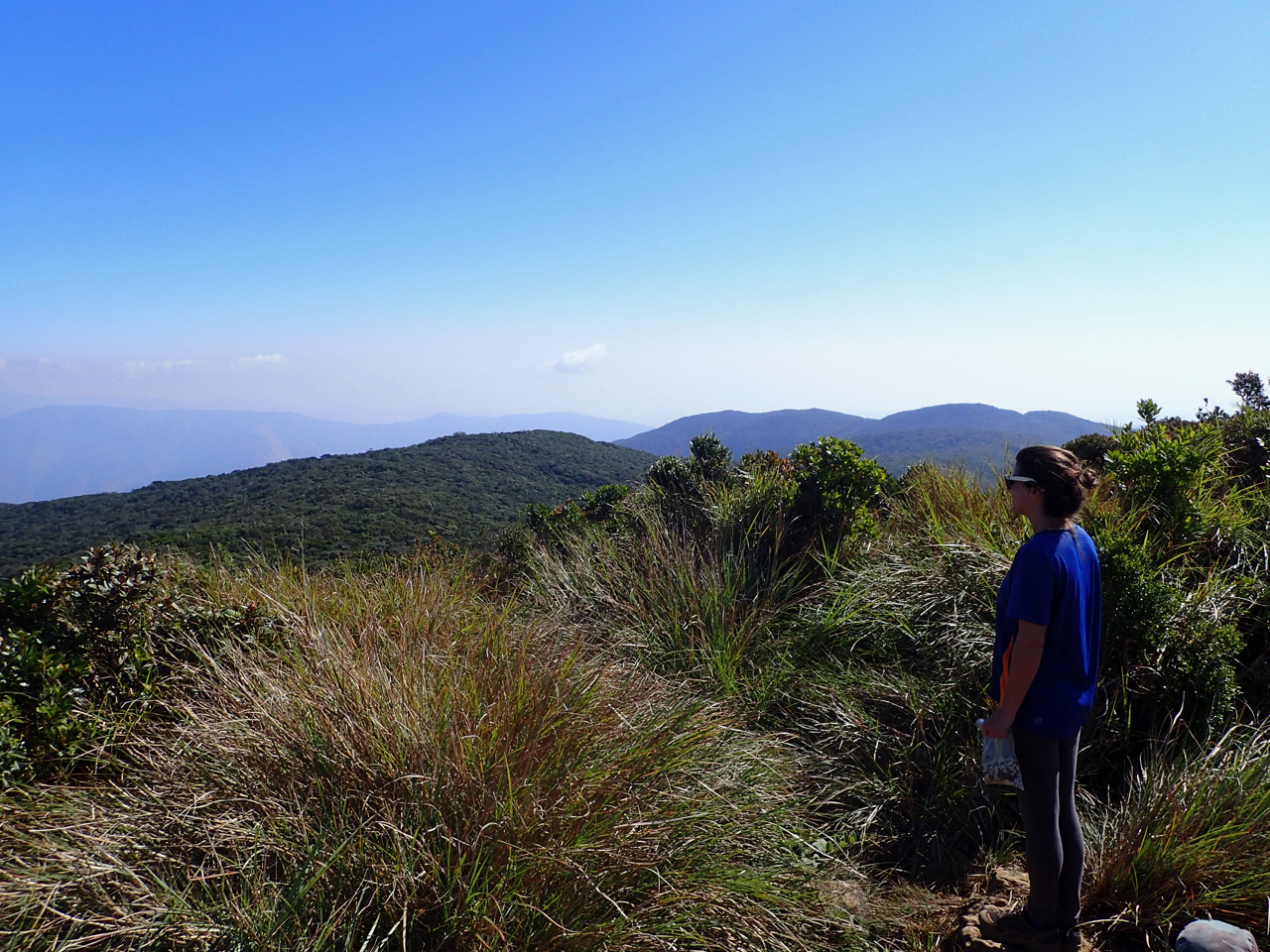
View from the summit

Mount Tapulao can be reached by trekking the mining road on a ridge on the side of the mountain with the forest line starting at about 1,875 metres (6,152 ft). The jump-off point is from the Dampay resettlement area in Brgy. Salaza in Palauig, which is around 8 kilometres (5.0 mi) from the Zambales Regional Highway on rough road. From the trailhead at Brgy. Dampay to the summit is around 18 kilometres (11 mi). Residents of Dampay are evacuees from the foot of Mount Pinatubo and are the "self-appointed guardians" of Mt. Tapulao under the coordination of the Municipal Tourism Authority of Palauig, Zambales.

The ascent can be done in 7–8 hours while the descent can be covered in half the time. Guests and tourists aiming to climb the mountain are required to register at the barangay hall to receive further safety, security and cooperation according to the rule and guidance of the tourism authority. Farther down the settlement is a trail leading to the jump off-point for the Bagsit River whitewater river rafting.

=== Traverse trek ===
A multi-day trek is also possible starting from the eastern side of the Mount Tapulao in Brgy. Labney in the town of Mayantoc in Tarlac province, ending in Palauig, or vice versa. The trail from the northwest is longer and a much more challenging route than the one from Zambales, but the reward is a more diverse environment and fauna.

== Ecosystem ==
- Department of Environment and Natural Resources (DENR) region 3 has signed a memorandum of agreement for the protection and development of 5,000-hectare (12,000-acre) Mt. Tapulao.
- Sangguniang Bayan (SB) of Iba, Zambales came out with an ordinance declaring the town's part of Mt. Tapulao as an eco-tourism destination and a protected area.

== Gallery ==
Mount Tapulao

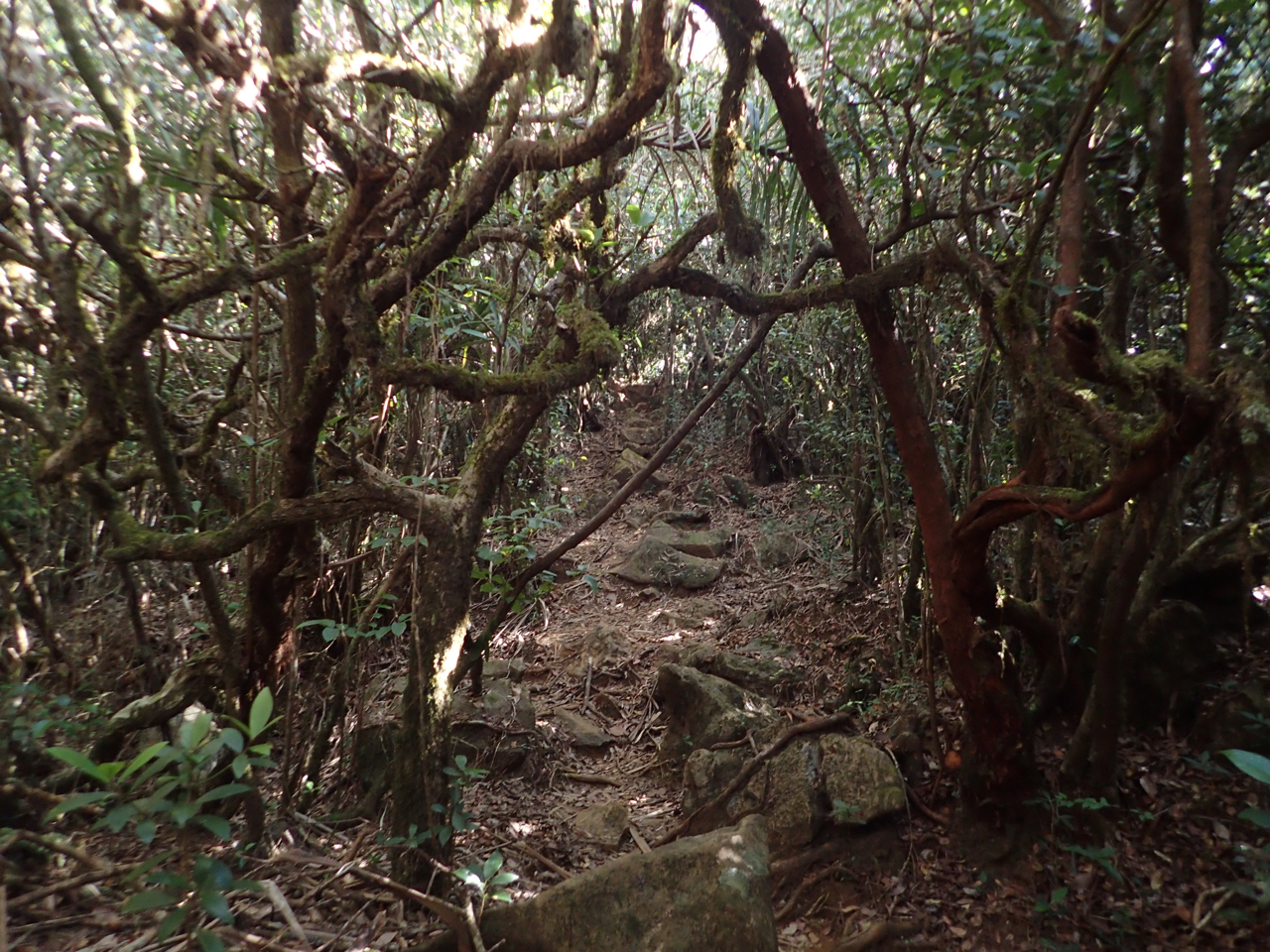
Cloud forest (mossy forest) near the summit

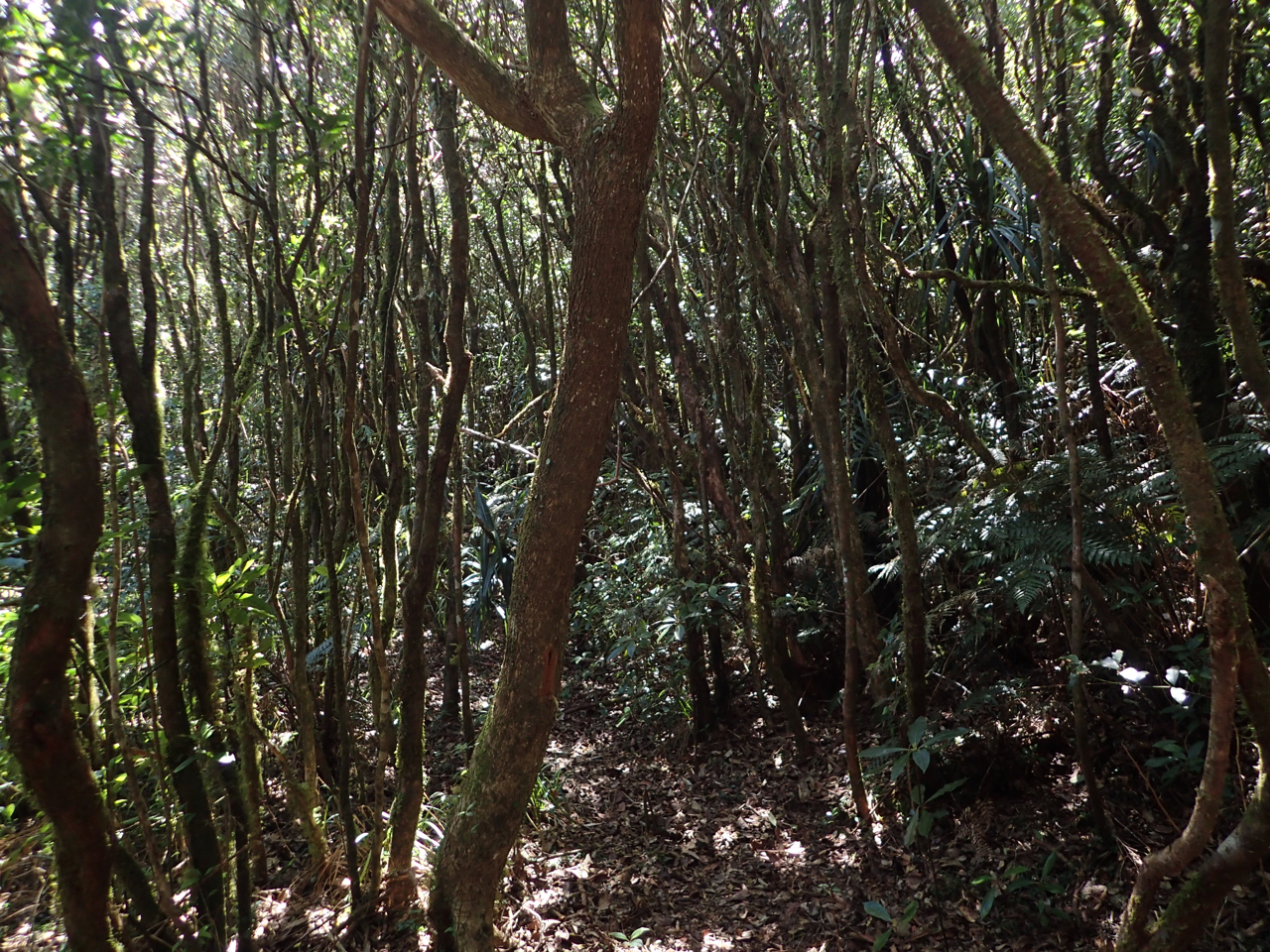
Mossy forest near the summit

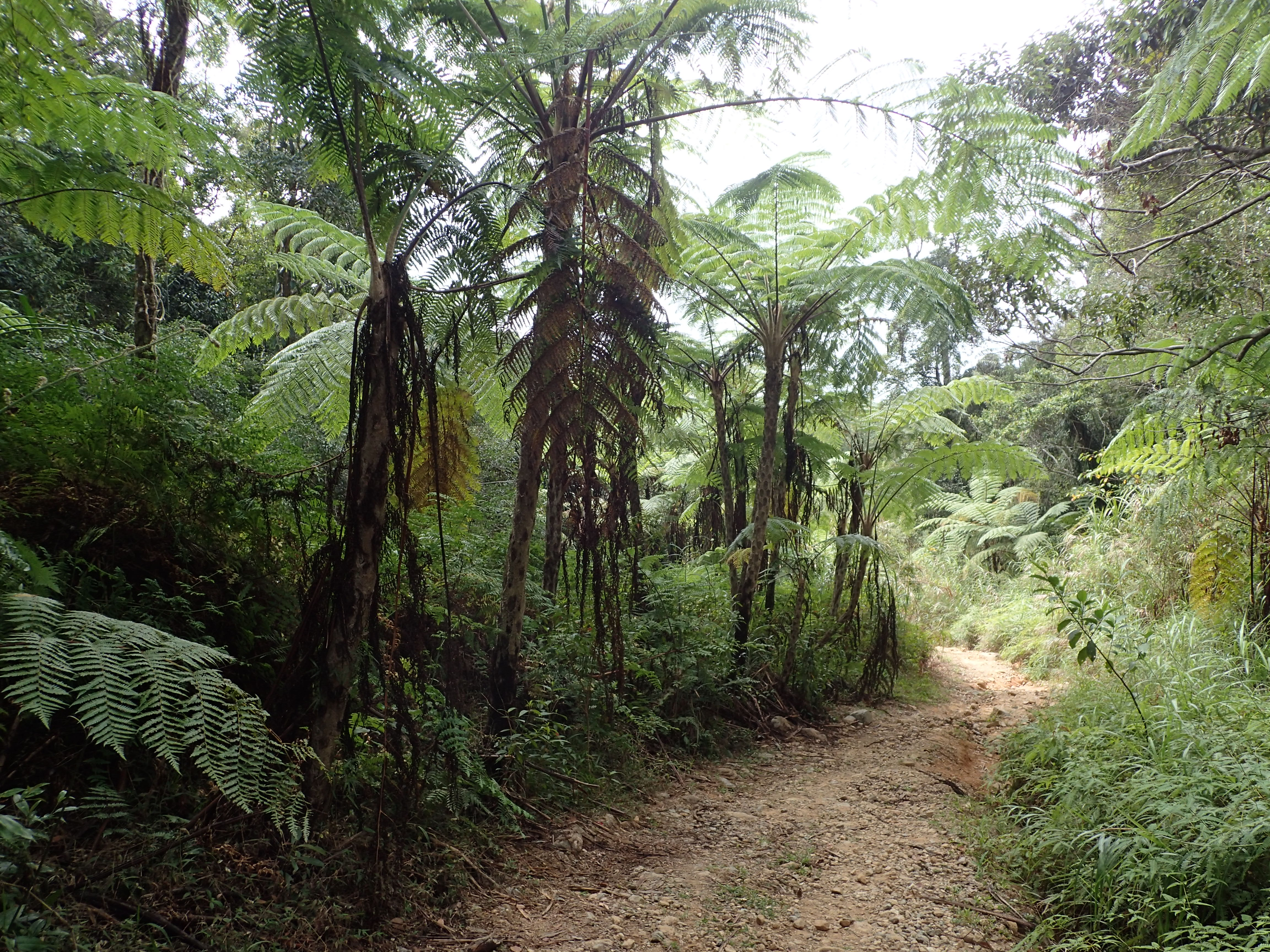
Tropical forest at lower elevations

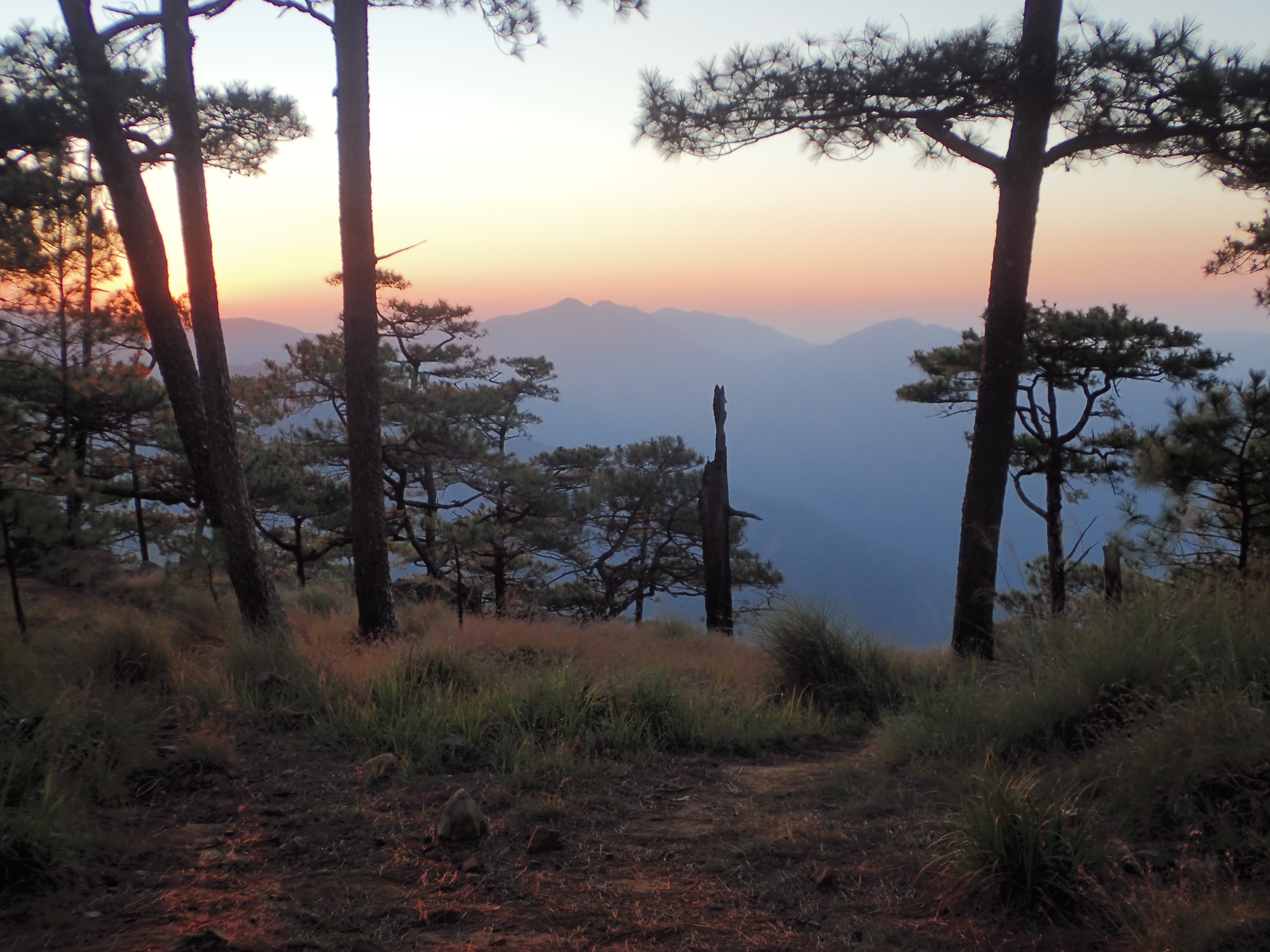
Sunrise from ridge

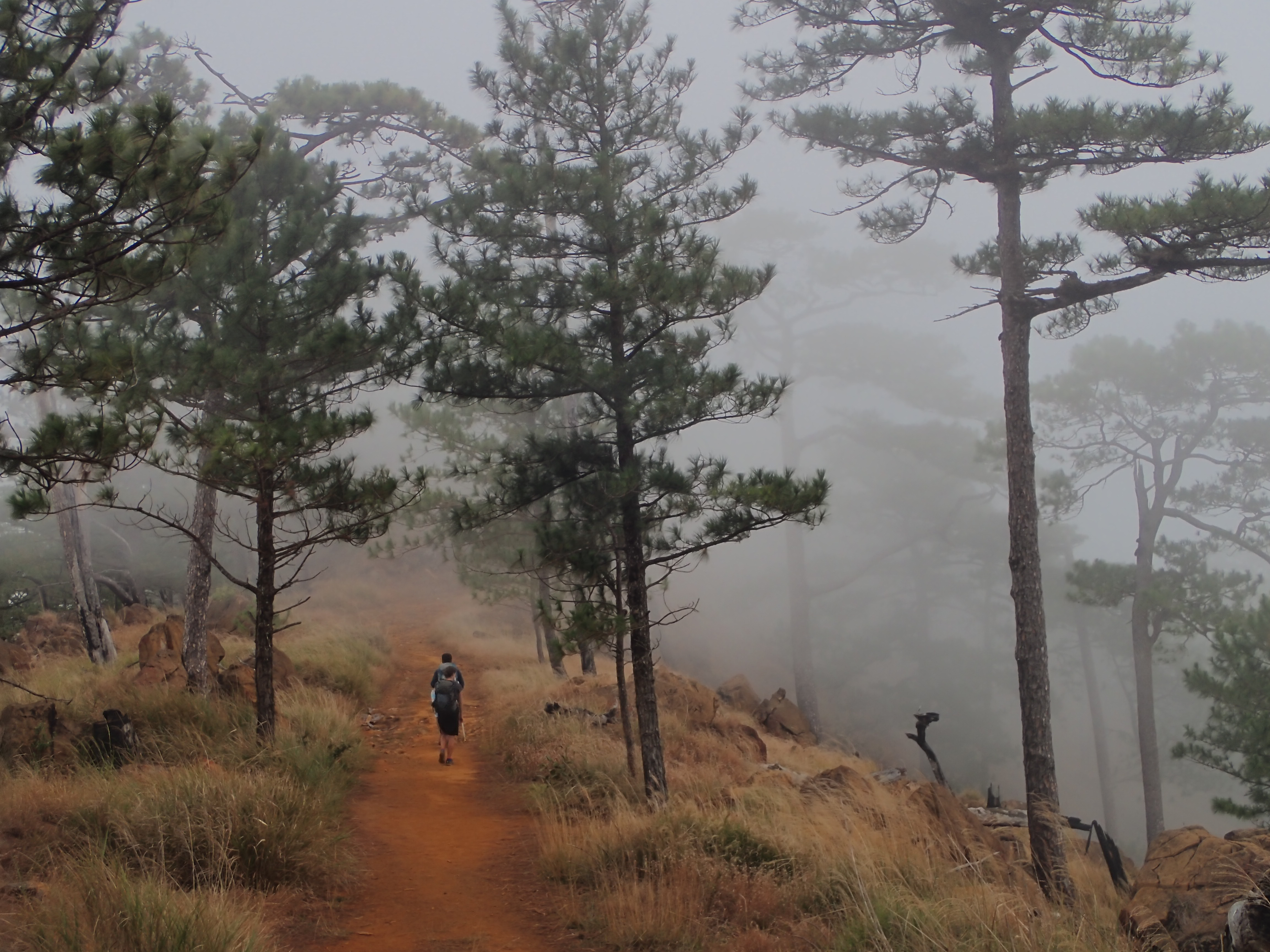
Pine forest in fog

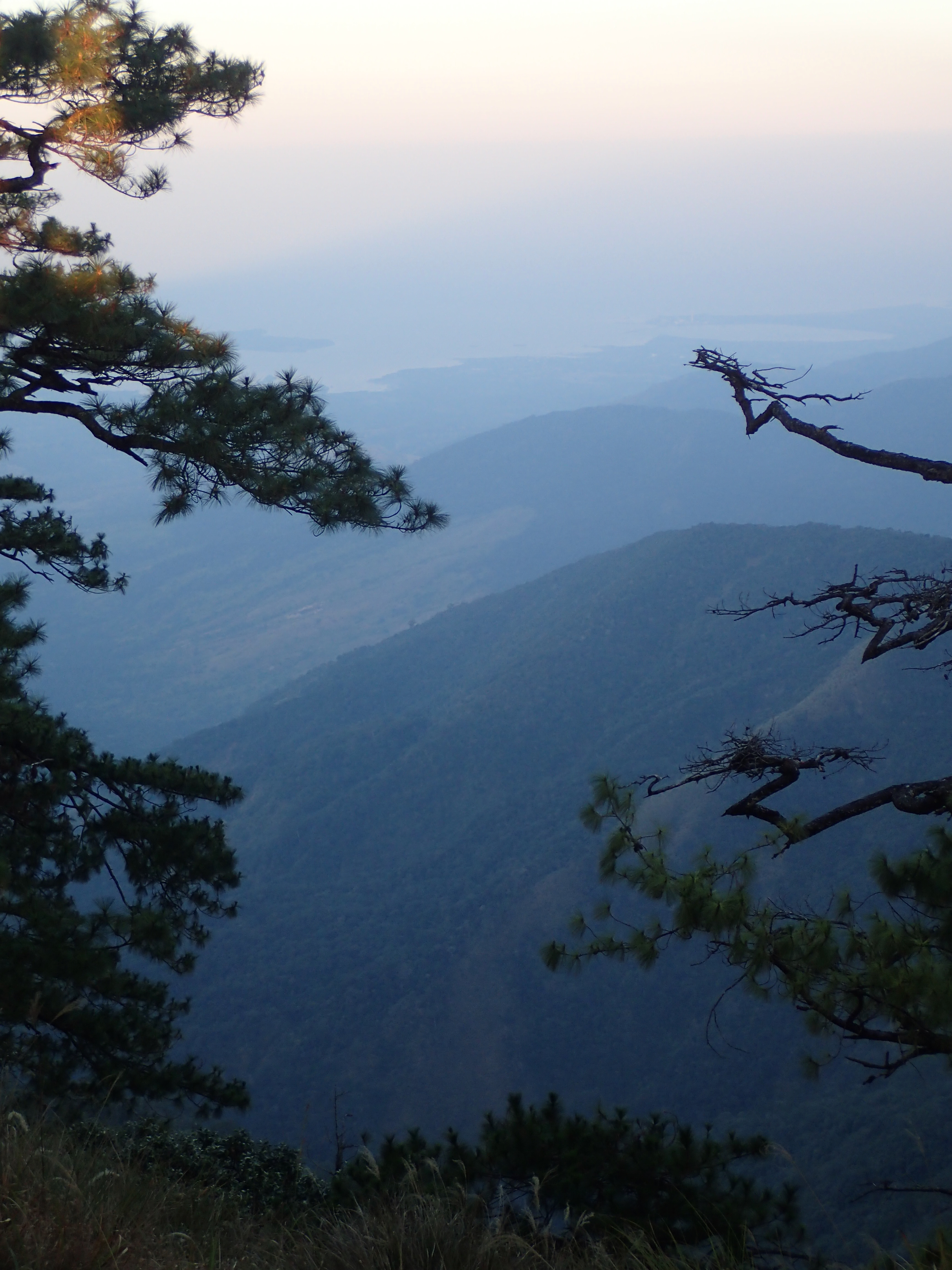
View of the South China Sea and lower flanks of the mountain

== See also ==
- List of mountains in the Philippines
- List of Southeast Asian mountains
- List of ultras of the Philippines
- Geography of the Philippines
