= Lake Pinatubo =

Volcanic lake in Zambales, Philippines

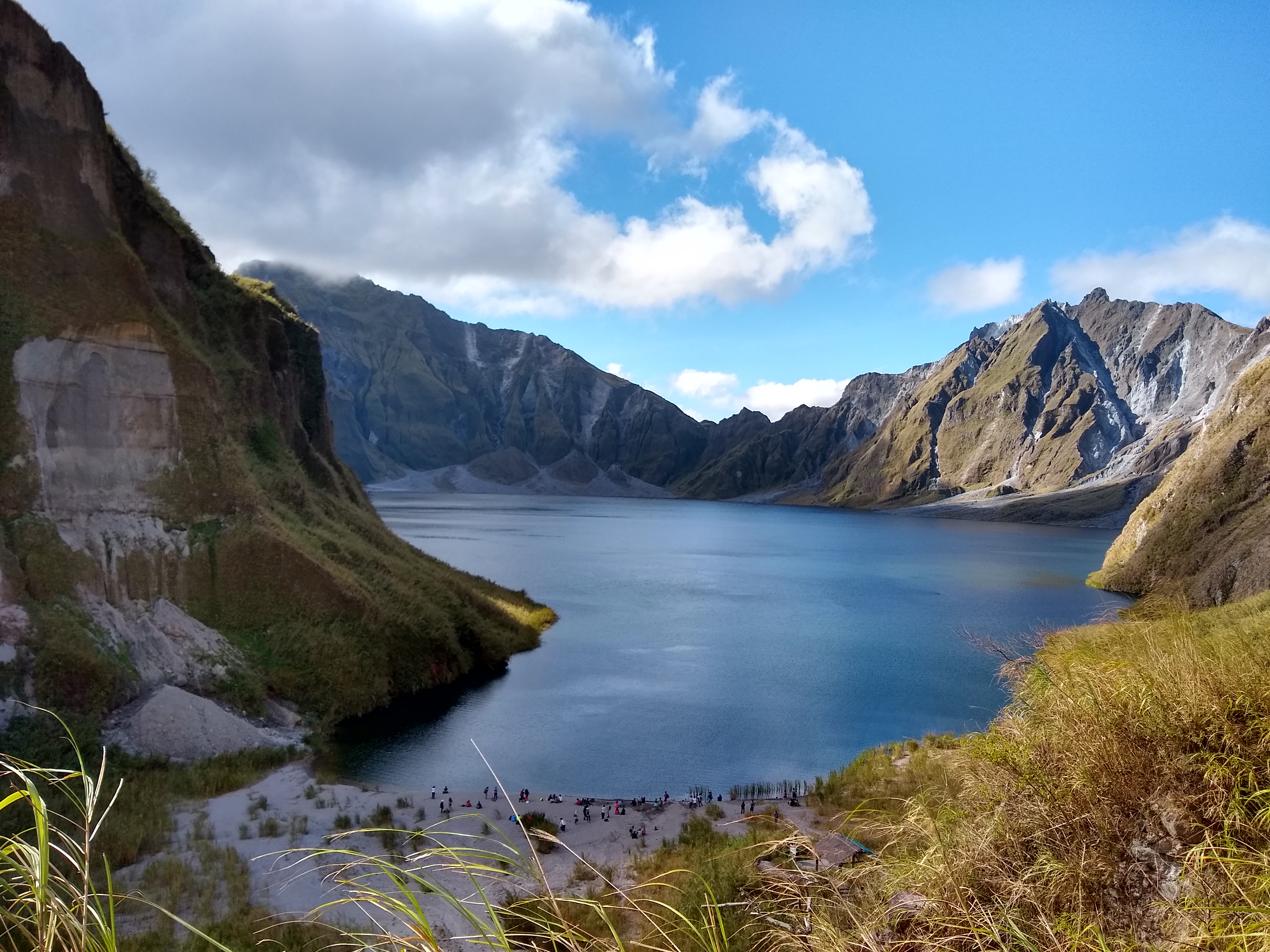
- The crater lake in 2019, formed after the 1991 eruption of Mount Pinatubo

- Location within the Philippines
- Location: Mount Pinatubo, Botolan, Zambales, Luzon
- Coordinates: 15°8′37″N 120°21′1″E
- Type: crater lake
- Primary inflows: Precipitation only
- Primary outflows: Bucao River; other smaller rivers and creeks
- Catchment area: 5 km^{2} (2 mi^{2})
- Basin countries: Philippines
- Max. width: 2.5 km (1.6 mi)
- Surface area: 1.83 km^{2} (0.71 sq mi) 183 ha (450 acres)
- Max. depth: 115–135 m (377–443 ft) in early July 2002, 95–115 m (312–377 ft) in July 2002, (dubious report of 600 m (2,000 ft) in 2005)
- Surface elevation: 900 m (3,000 ft)
- Settlements: Botolan; San Marcelino

Lake Pinatubo (Filipino: Lawa ng Pinatubo) is the summit crater lake of Mount Pinatubo formed after its climactic eruption on June 15, 1991. The lake is located in the Zambales Mountains, in Botolan, Zambales, near the boundaries of Pampanga and Tarlac provinces in the Philippines. It is about 90 km (56 mi) northwest of the capital city of Manila. While one paper by researchers from Japan suggested a depth of 600 m (2,000 ft), more detailed research suggests that 95–115 m (312–377 ft) is more accurate.

== Geology ==
Mount Pinatubo's volcanic activity has followed a cycle: centuries of repose terminated by a caldera-forming eruption with large pyroclastic flows; a post-eruption aftermath of rain-triggered lahars in surrounding drainages and dome-building that fills the caldera; and then another long quiescent period. During and after the eruptions, lahars descending along volcano channels may block tributaries from watersheds beyond Pinatubo, creating natural lakes. Geophysical evidence shows that there were at least two ancient lakes in the Mapanuepe River valley in the southwestern part of the volcano.

== Origin ==
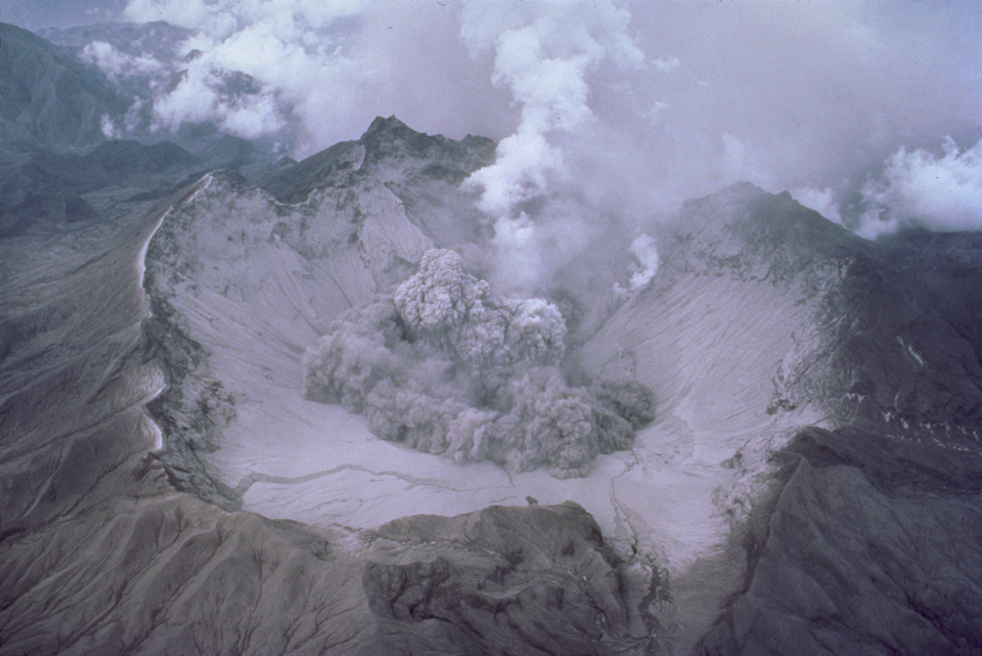
Aerial view of the summit caldera on August 1, 1991, before the formation of Lake Pinatubo.

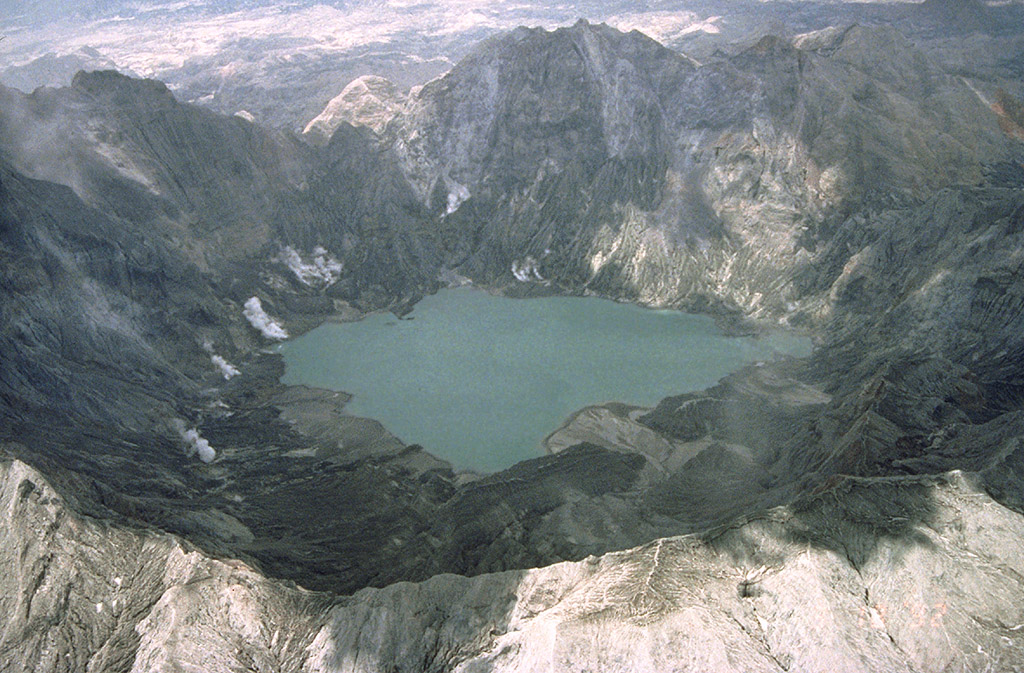
Aerial view of the lake and summit caldera on May 18, 1992, after the 1991 eruption

The climactic 1991 eruption of Mount Pinatubo destroyed the volcano's original summit. In its place is a 2.5 kilometres (1.6 mi) diameter caldera, the center of which is offset 1 kilometre (0.62 mi) northward from the pre-eruption summit. It was created from the collapse of the volcano's summit on June 15, during the period of abundant large earthquakes in response to withdrawal of a large volume of magma from the reservoir beneath the volcano. By early September 1991, a shallow lake formed. The high precipitation rate of the area led to a rapid transition from a small and hot acidic lake to a large lake with near-ambient temperature and pH.

== Ancestral domain ==
On January 14, 2010, Certificate of Ancestral Domain Title (CADT) was awarded to 1,501 Aeta families in Botolan, Zambales. The area covers 15,860 hectares that include the four barangays of Villar, Burgos, Moraza and Belbel in Botolan, Zambales, which encompasses the Zambales side of Mount Pinatubo and includes the summit and Lake Pinatubo.

== Legend ==
The mountain range wherein the volcano is located is inhabited by the indigenous Aetas. An old Aeta legend tells of a lake that once existed in the site, most probably the latter of the two ancient crater lakes, and of a great explosion that destroyed it.

== Lake drainage ==
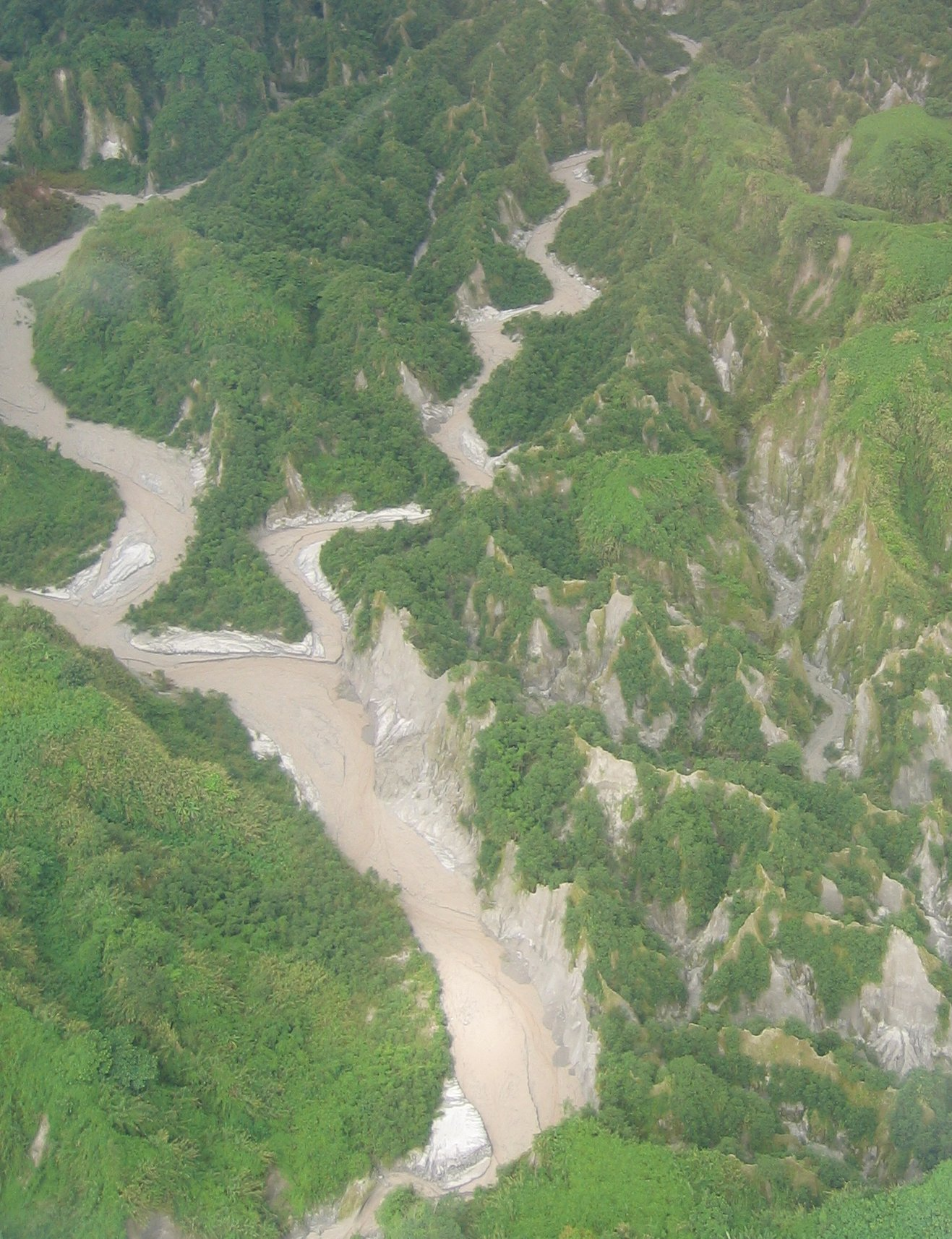
Lahar canyons in the Pinatubo area, 2006

Risk of flash floods in the communities found in the vicinity of the recently dormant volcano is imminent because of a danger of the caldera collapsing due to water pressure and a long-term increase in the water level of ~1 m/month. Experts had feared the weight of the water could have breached the crater walls and flooded the homes of up to 40,000 people in and around the small coastal town of Botolan, located 25 miles from the volcano.

In September 2001, residents of Botolan and nearby areas were sent to evacuation centers as a precaution from a possible deluge of mud and water. The Philippine government ordered a controlled draining of the lake and had authorities dig a 5m-wide channel from the edge of the volcano's crater, draining about a quarter of the lake's volume and diverting the excess lakewater into local rivers. Existing lahar canyons serve as water drainage paths to surrounding rivers and creeks, the largest of which is the Bucao River. In 2002, accumulated rainwater in the lake rose to dangerous levels during the rainy monsoon season, breached the artificial drainage canal, and triggered mild lahar flows in the area.

== Tourism ==
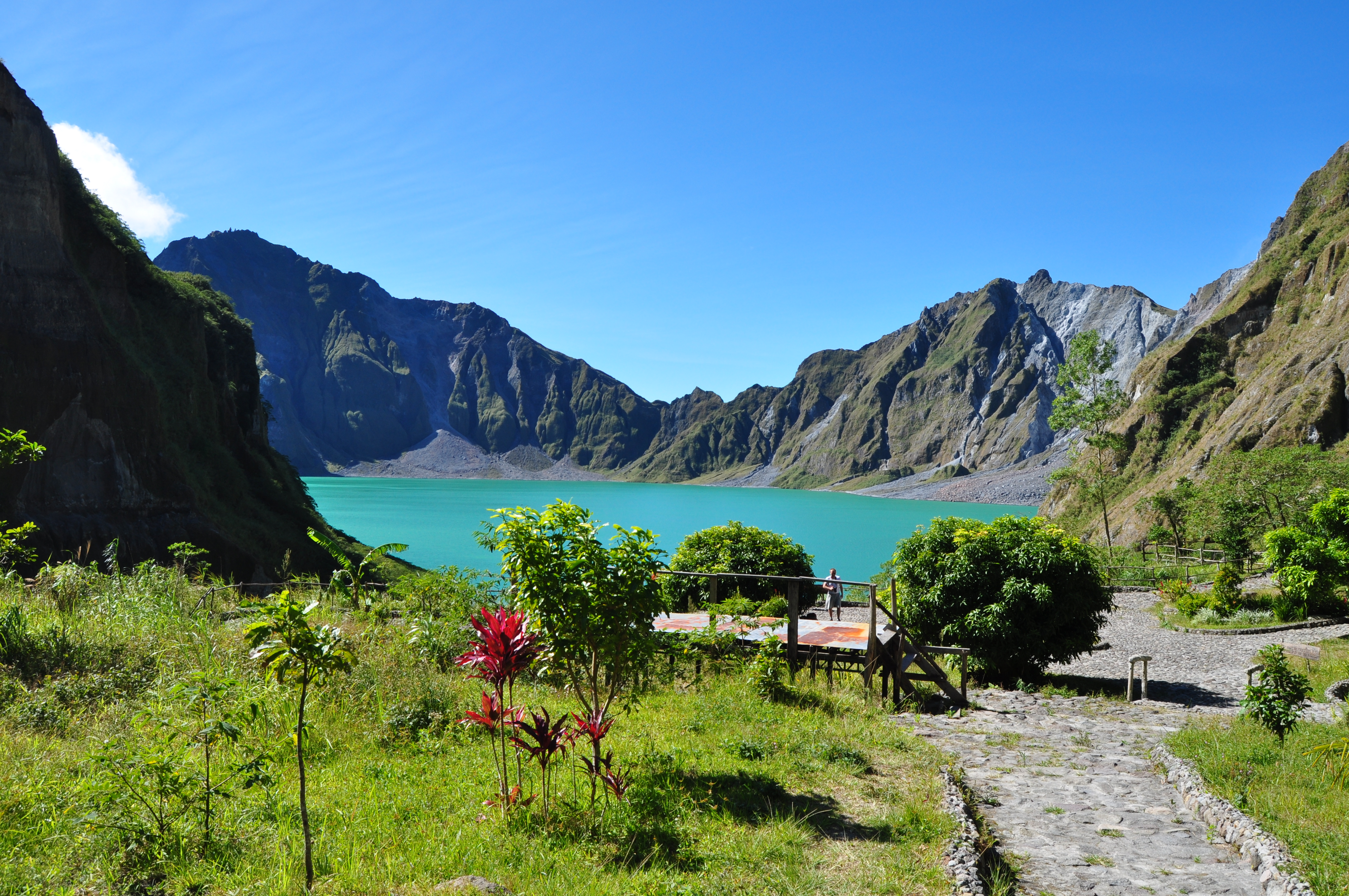
Lake Pinatubo in 2012

The lake is described as "a wide jewel of blue and green" and is now a popular bush walking destination, mostly frequented by mountaineers and adventure-seekers. Until improvements were made, a trip to the summit involved either days of hiking or hours of 4-wheel vehicle travel followed by a 2-hour hard hike. Eventually, a trail called the Skyway was made that allows four-wheel drive vehicles a shorter route to a drop off point to trek to the crater. The skyway shortened the route from a ride 2 hours and 9 minutes long to an hour's trek.

== See also ==
- List of lakes of the Philippines
- Taal Lake

== Sources ==
- Stimac, James A.; Goff, Fraser; Counce, Dale; Larocque, Adrienne C. L.; Hilton, David R.; Morgenstern, Uwe (2004). "The crater lake and hydrothermal system of Mount Pinatubo, Philippines: evolution in the decade after eruption". Bulletin of Volcanology. 66 (2): 149–167. Bibcode:2004BVol...66..149S. doi:10.1007/s00445-003-0300-3. S2CID 128408824.
- Yang, P.; Yokoyama, N.; Inoue, K.; Amina, K. (2005). "Preliminary investigation of the crater lake breach at Mt. Pinatubo, Philippines". Journal of the Japan Society of Engineering Geology. 46 (5). Japan Society of Engineering Geology: 288. doi:10.5110/jjseg.46.287.
- Newhall, C.G. and Punongbayan, R.S., Fire and Mud: Eruptions and Lahars of Mount Pinatubo, Philippines, Philippine Institute of Volcanology and Seismology, Quezon City and University of Washington Press, Seattle and London, 1126 pages, 1996. (retrieved: March 10, 2009)
- BBC NEWS World: Asia-Pacific, Friday, September 7, 2001, 12:52 GMT 13:52 UK (retrieved: March 10, 2009)
- BBC NEWS World: Asia-Pacific, Friday, September 7, 2001, 21:25 GMT 22:25 UK (retrieved: March 12, 2009)
