= Mount Cuadrado =

Mountain in Luzon, Philippines

- Location within Luzon Location within Philippines

Highest point
- Elevation: 1,324 m (4,344 ft)
- Coordinates: 15°01′56″N 120°20′47″E

Geography
- Country: Philippines
- Region: Central Luzon
- Province: Zambales
- municipality: San Marcelino

Mount Cuadrado, also known as Mount Quadrado and Mount Quebrado, is a mountain peak located in the Cabusilan Mountains. It has a height of 1,324 m (4,344 ft), and it is located between Mount Negron and Mount Natib. Heading northwest, the part of the Philippines is Manila, approximately 80 kilometers away from the mountain. Mount Cuadrado belongs to the Cabusilan sub-range together with Mount Negron, Mount Mataba and Mount Pinatubo.

== Climate ==
The average temperature in 23 °C (73 °F) per year, the warmest month is April, at 25 °C (77 °F), and the coldest month is December, at 22 °C (71 °F). The wettest month is August, with 1,071 millimeters of rain.
