= Mount Pinatubo =

Active stratovolcano in Luzon, Philippines

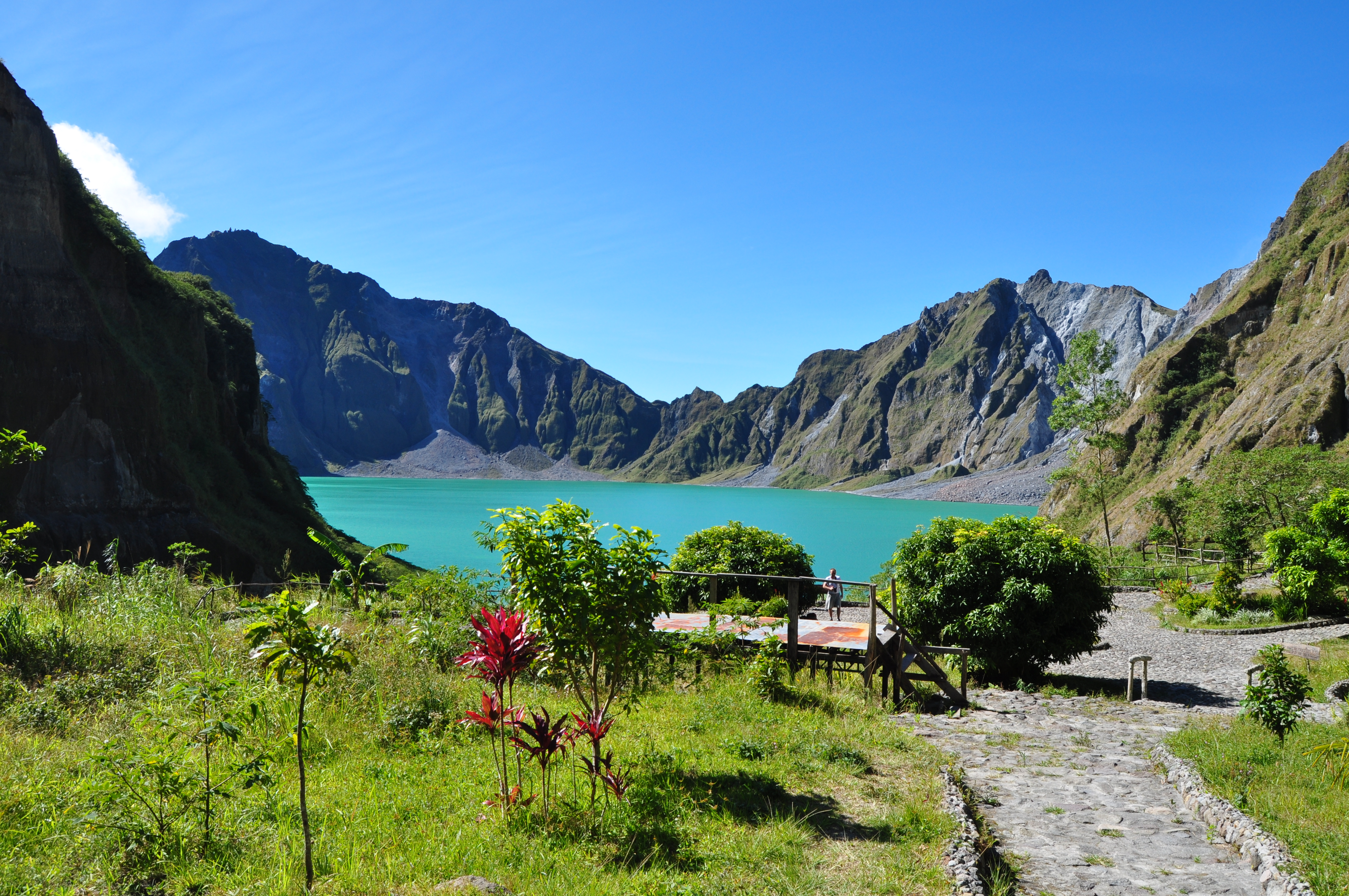
- Mount Pinatubo after the 1991 eruption, the crater lake in 2012

Highest point
- Elevation: 1,486 m (4,875 ft) (current); 1,745 m (5,725 ft) (before 1991 eruption)
- Listing: Active volcanoes in the Philippines
- Coordinates: 15°08′30″N 120°21′00″E

Naming
- Language of name: Tagalog
- Pronunciation: /ˌpiːnəˈtuːboʊ/

Geography
- Location within Philippines
- Location: Luzon
- Country: Philippines
- Region: Central Luzon
- Provinces: Pampanga; Tarlac; Zambales
- Parent range: Zambales Mountains

Geology
- Rock age(s): Between 635,000 ± 80,000 and 1.1 ± 0.09 million years
- Mountain type: Stratovolcano
- Volcanic arc: Luzon Volcanic Arc
- Last eruption: November 30, 2021

Mount Pinatubo is an active stratovolcano in the Zambales Mountains in Luzon in the Philippines. Located on the tripoint of Zambales, Tarlac and Pampanga provinces, most people were unaware of its eruptive history before the pre-eruption volcanic activity in early 1991. Dense forests, which supported a population of several thousand indigenous Aetas, heavily eroded and obscured Pinatubo.

Pinatubo is known for its VEI-6 eruption on June 15, 1991, the second-largest terrestrial eruption of the 20th century after the 1912 eruption of Novarupta in Alaska. The eruption coincided with Typhoon Yunya making landfall in the Philippines, which brought a dangerous mix of ash and rain to nearby towns and cities. Early predictions led to the evacuation of tens of thousands of people, saving many lives. The eruption severely damaged surrounding areas with pyroclastic surges, pyroclastic falls, and later, flooding lahars caused by rainwater re-mobilizing volcanic deposits. This destruction affected infrastructure and altered river systems for years. Minor dome-forming eruptions inside the caldera continued from 1992 to 1993.

The 1991 eruption had worldwide effects. It released roughly 10 billion tonnes (1.1×10^{10} short tons) or 10 km^{3} (2.4 cu mi) of magma, bringing large amounts of minerals and toxic metals to the surface. It also released 20 million tonnes (22 million short tons) of SO_{2}. It ejected more particulate into the stratosphere than any eruption since Krakatoa in 1883. In the following months, aerosols formed a global layer of sulfuric acid haze. Global temperatures dropped by about 0.5 °C (0.9 °F) in the years 1991–1993, and ozone depletion temporarily increased significantly.

== Geography ==
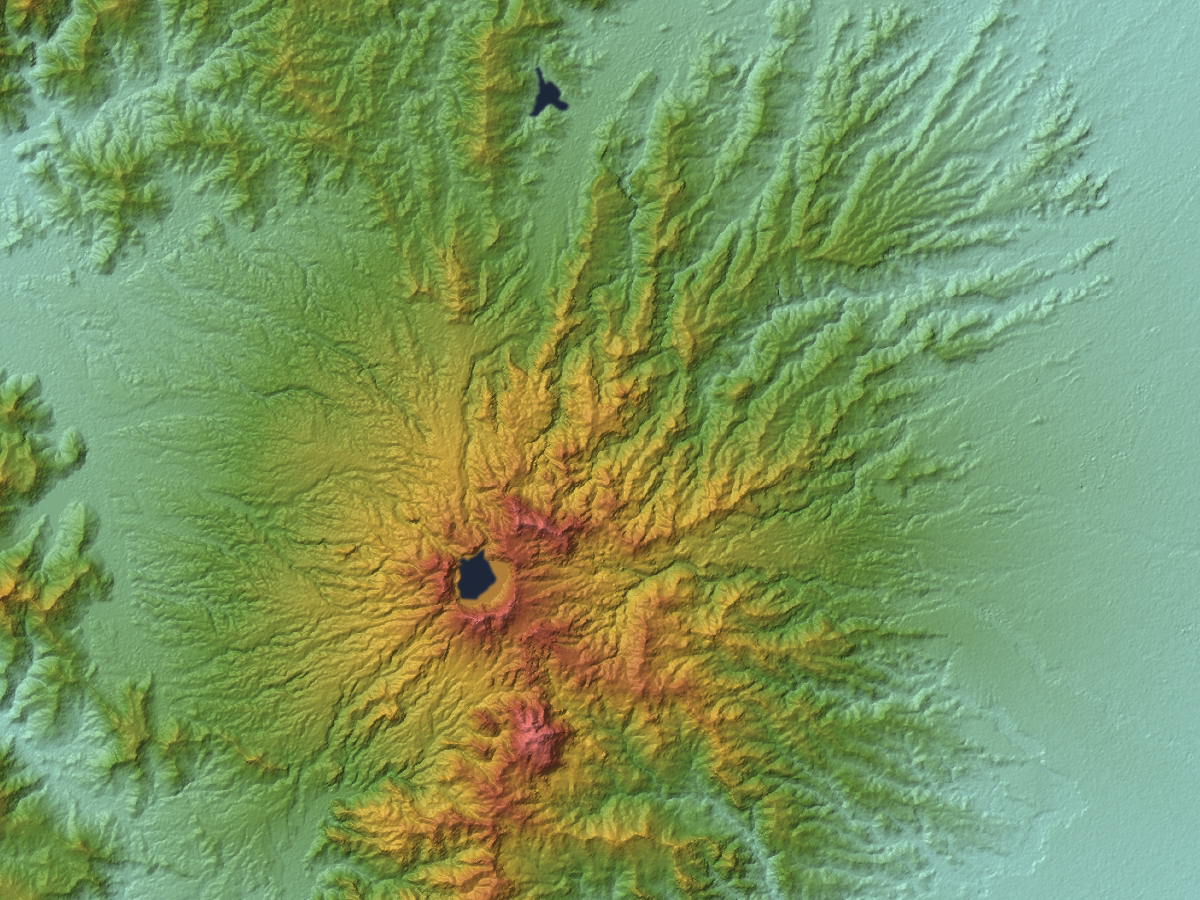
Mount Pinatubo relief map

The volcano is about 87 kilometers (54 mi) northwest of Manila, the capital of the Philippines. Near Mount Pinatubo are former military bases that were maintained by the United States. The U.S. Naval Base Subic Bay was 37 kilometers (23 mi) south of Pinatubo, and the extent of Clark Air Base was just 14 kilometers (8.7 mi) east of the volcano's summit. The volcano is near to about 6 million people.

== History ==
Even before the 1991 eruption, Mount Pinatubo had little topographic prominence: it was 1,745 m (5,725 ft) above sea level, only about 600 m (2,000 ft) above nearby plains, and only about 200 m (660 ft) higher than surrounding peaks, which largely obscured it from view. It is part of a chain of volcanoes which lie along the western side of the island of Luzon called the Zambales Mountains.

Pinatubo belongs to the Cabusilan sub-range of the Zambales Mountains, which consists of Mount Cuadrado, Mount Negron, Mount Mataba and Mount Pinatubo. They are subduction volcanoes, formed by the Eurasian plate sliding under the Philippine Mobile Belt along the Manila Trench to the west. Mount Pinatubo and the other volcanoes on this volcanic belt arise due to magmatic occlusion from this subduction plate boundary.

Pinatubo is flanked on the west by the Zambales Ophiolite Complex, which is an easterly-dipping section of Eocene oceanic crust uplifted during the late Oligocene. The Tarlac Formation north, east and southeast of Pinatubo consists of marine, nonmarine and volcanoclastic sediments formed in the late Miocene and Pliocene.

The most recent study of Mount Pinatubo before the activities of 1991 was the overall geological study in 1983 and 1984 made by F. G. Delfin for the Philippine National Oil Company as part of the surface investigations of the area before exploratory drilling and well testing for geothermal energy sources in 1988 to 1990. He recognized two life histories of the mountain, which he classified as "ancestral" and "modern" Pinatubo.

=== Ancestral Pinatubo ===
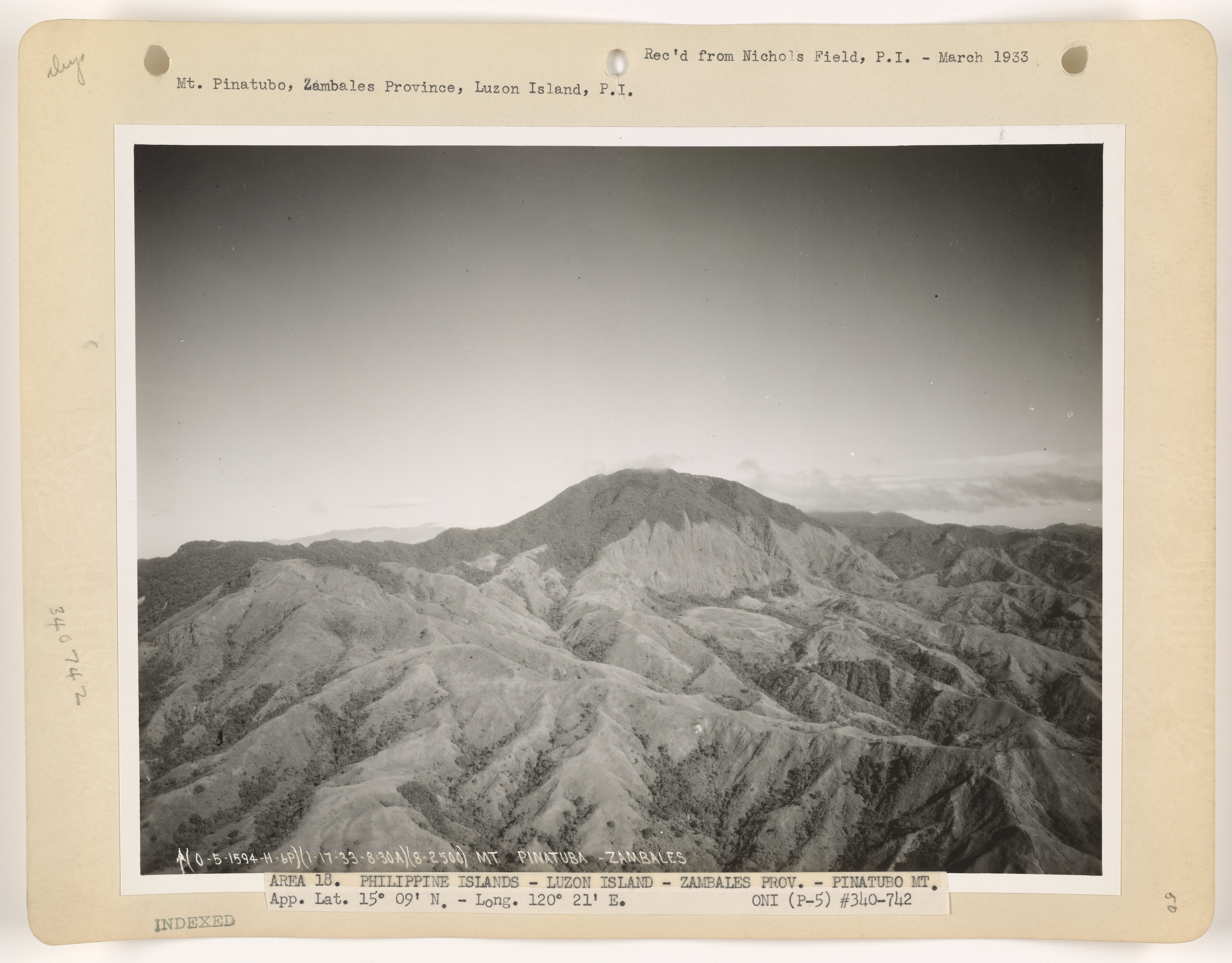
Aerial view of Mount Pinatubo prior to 1991 eruption, March 1933

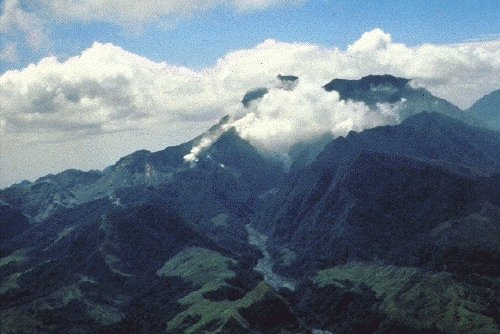
Pinatubo in April 1991, approximately two months in advance of the eruption.

Activity of Ancestral Pinatubo seems to have begun about 1.1 million years ago and probably ended tens of thousands of years or more before the birth of "modern" Pinatubo. Much of the rugged land around the present volcano consists of remnants of "ancestral" Pinatubo. It was an andesite and dacite stratovolcano whose eruptive activity was much less explosive than modern Pinatubo. Its center was roughly where the current volcano is. The projected height of the mountain is up to 2,300 m (7,500 ft), or 1.43 miles above sea level if it were a lone peak, based on a profile fitting to the remaining lower slopes, or lower if it had more than one peak.

The old volcano is exposed in the walls of an old 3.5 km × 4.5 km (2.2 mi × 2.8 mi) wide caldera, referred to as Tayawan Caldera by Delfin. Some of the nearby peaks are the remnants of ancestral Pinatubo, left behind when the softer parts of the old mountain slopes were eroded by weathering. Ancestral Pinatubo is a somma volcano with modern Pinatubo as the new cone. Mount Dorst, to the east, is part of the dip slope of the ancestral Pinatubo. Several mountains near modern Pinatubo are old satellite vents of ancestral Pinatubo, forming volcanic plugs and lava domes. These satellite vents were probably active around the same time as the ancestral volcano and include the domes of Mount Negron, Mount Cuadrado, Mount Mataba and the Bituin and Tapungho plugs.

=== Modern Pinatubo ===
- c. 79,000 BC: After a long period of dormancy, Modern Pinatubo was born in Ancestral Pinatubo's cataclysmic and most explosive eruptions, estimated to be five times larger than the June 1991 eruption. It deposited all around the volcano up to 25 km^{3} (6.0 cu mi) of pyroclastic surge material up to 100 meters (330 ft) thick. The total volume of volcanic material ejected during the eruptions is unknown. The removal of so much material from the underlying magma chamber resulted in the Tayawan caldera. The violent eruptive period started by the eruption is referred to by Delfin as the Inararo Eruptive Period, named after a village that was destroyed in the 1991 eruption.

Later eruptions of modern Pinatubo occurred episodically and lasted for periods much shorter than the repose intervals between them. Subsequent eruptions and eruptive period occurred about:

- c. 15,000 BC (Sacobia Eruptive Period)
- c. 7000 BC (Pasbul Eruptive Period). Its eruptions were as energetic, if not as voluminous as the Inararo eruptions.
- c. 4000–3000 BC (Crow Valley Eruptive Period). This and the Mara-unot period's eruptions were smaller than the Inararo eruptions but about two to three times as big as that of 1991 based on the pyroclastic flow runout distances and depths of valley filling.
- c. 1900–300 BC (Maraunot Eruptive Period)
- c. AD 1500 (Buag Eruptive Period). Its eruptions were roughly the same size as those of 1991.

Each of these eruptions seems to have been very large, ejecting more than 10 km^{3} (2.4 cu mi) of material and covering large parts of the surrounding areas with pyroclastic flow deposits. Some eruptive periods have lasted decades and perhaps as much as several centuries and might appear to include multiple large explosive eruptions.

The maximum size of eruptions in each eruptive period though has been getting smaller through the more than 35,000-year history of modern Pinatubo, but this might be an artifact of erosion and burial of older deposits. The oldest eruption of modern Pinatubo, Inararo, was also its largest.

The 1991 eruption was among the smallest documented in its geologic record.

The volcano has never grown very large between eruptions, because it produces mostly unwelded, easily erodible deposits and periodically destroys the viscous domes that fill its vents. After the Buag eruption (c. 1500 AD), the volcano lay dormant, its slopes becoming completely covered in dense rainforest and eroded into gullies and ravines. The c. 500-year repose though between the Buag and present eruptive periods is among the shorter repose periods recognized in its geologic history.

==== 1991 eruption ====
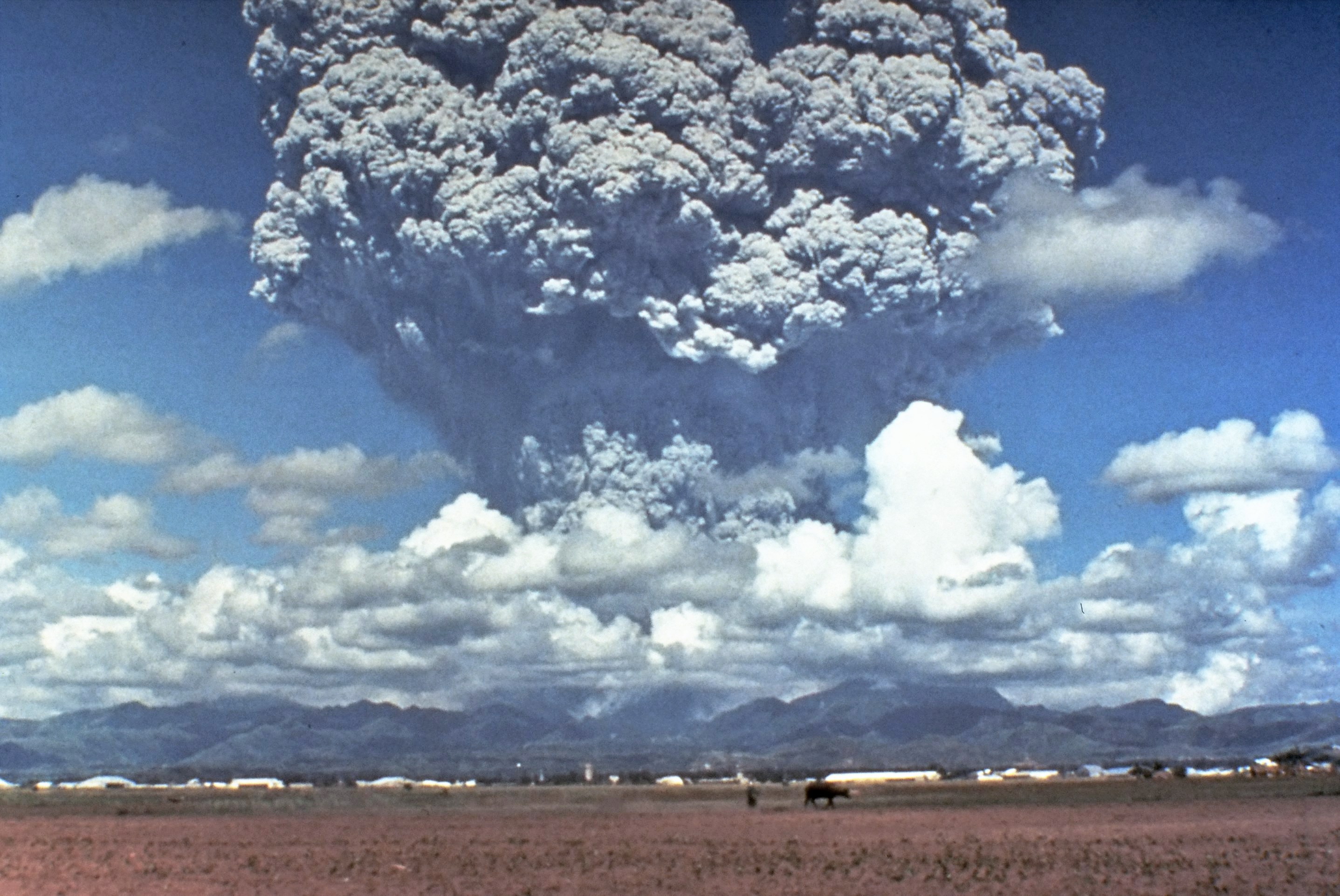
The eruption column of Mount Pinatubo on June 12, 1991, three days before the climactic eruption

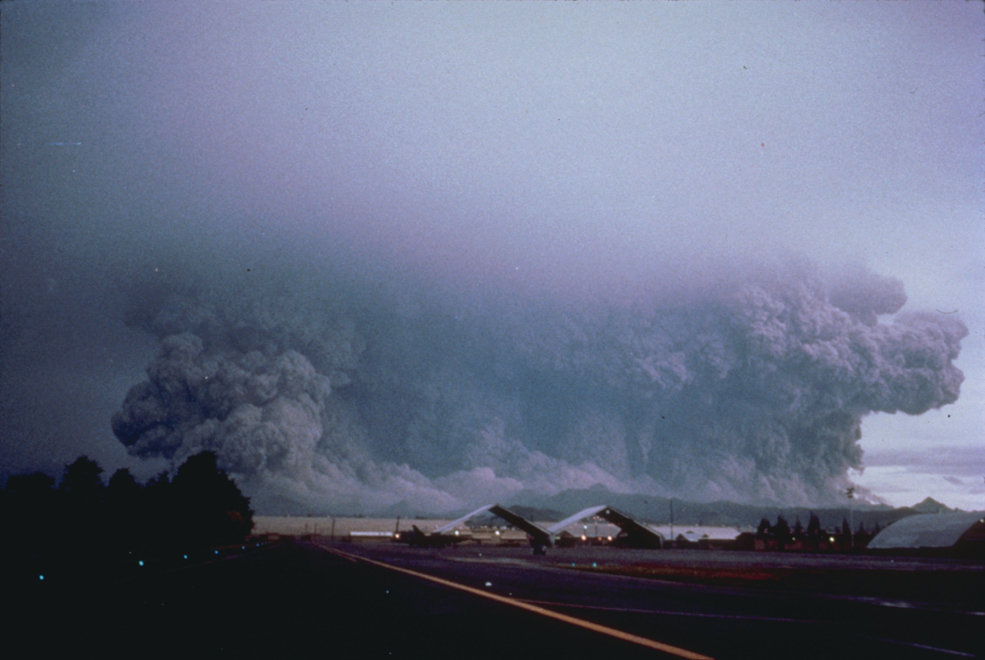
View to the west from Clark Air Base of the major eruption of Pinatubo on June 15, 1991. The June 15–16 climatic phase lasted more than fifteen hours, sent tephra about 35 km (22 mi) into the atmosphere, generated voluminous pyroclastic flows, and left a caldera in the former summit region. Later dubbed Black Saturday, the day of darkness stretched for 36 hours.

In March and April 1991, magma rising toward the surface from more than 32 km (20 mi) beneath Pinatubo triggered small volcano tectonic earthquakes and caused powerful steam explosions that blasted three craters on the north flank of the volcano. Thousands of small earthquakes occurred beneath Pinatubo through April, May and early June and many thousand of tons of noxious sulfur dioxide gas were also emitted by the volcano. From June 7 to 12, the first magma reached the surface of Mount Pinatubo. Because it had lost most of the gas contained in it on the way to the surface, the magma oozed out to form a lava dome but did not cause an explosive eruption.

A small blast at 3:41 PST on June 12 marked the beginning of a new, more violent phase of the eruption as millions of cubic yards of gas-charged magma reached the surface and exploded in the reawakening volcano's first spectacular eruption. A few hours later the same day, massive blasts lasting about half an hour generated big eruption columns, which quickly reached heights of over 19 kilometres (62,000 ft) and which generated large pyroclastic surges extending up to four kilometres (2.5 mi) from the summit in some river valleys. Fourteen hours later, a 15-minute blast hurled volcanic matter to heights of 24 km (15 mi). Friction in the up-rushing ash column generated abundant volcanic lightning.

When even more highly gas-charged magma reached Pinatubo's surface on June 15, the volcano exploded in a cataclysmic eruption that ejected about 10 km^{3} (2.4 mi^{3}) of total material. The ash cloud from this climactic eruption rose 35 km (22 mi) into the atmosphere. At lower altitudes, the volcanic ash was blown in all directions by the intense cyclonic winds of a coincidentally occurring typhoon, and winds at higher altitudes blew the ash southwestward. A blanket of ash and larger pumice lapilli blanketed the countryside. Fine ash fell as far away as the Indian Ocean and satellites tracked the ash cloud several times around the globe.

Huge pyroclastic flows roared down the flanks of Mount Pinatubo, filling once-deep valleys with fresh volcanic deposits as much as 200 m (660 ft) thick. The eruption removed so much magma and rock from below the volcano that the summit collapsed to form a 2.5 km (1.6 mi) wide caldera.

Following the climactic eruption of June 15, 1991, activity at the volcano continued at a much lower level, with continuous ash eruptions lasting until August 1991 and episodic eruptions continuing for another month.

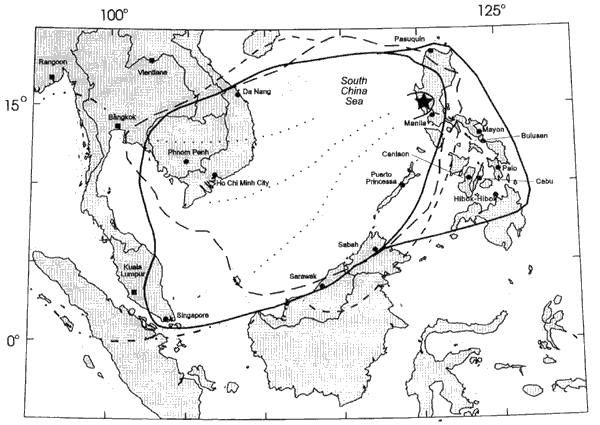
The location of Mount Pinatubo and the regional ash fallout from the 1991 eruption

==== Later eruptions ====
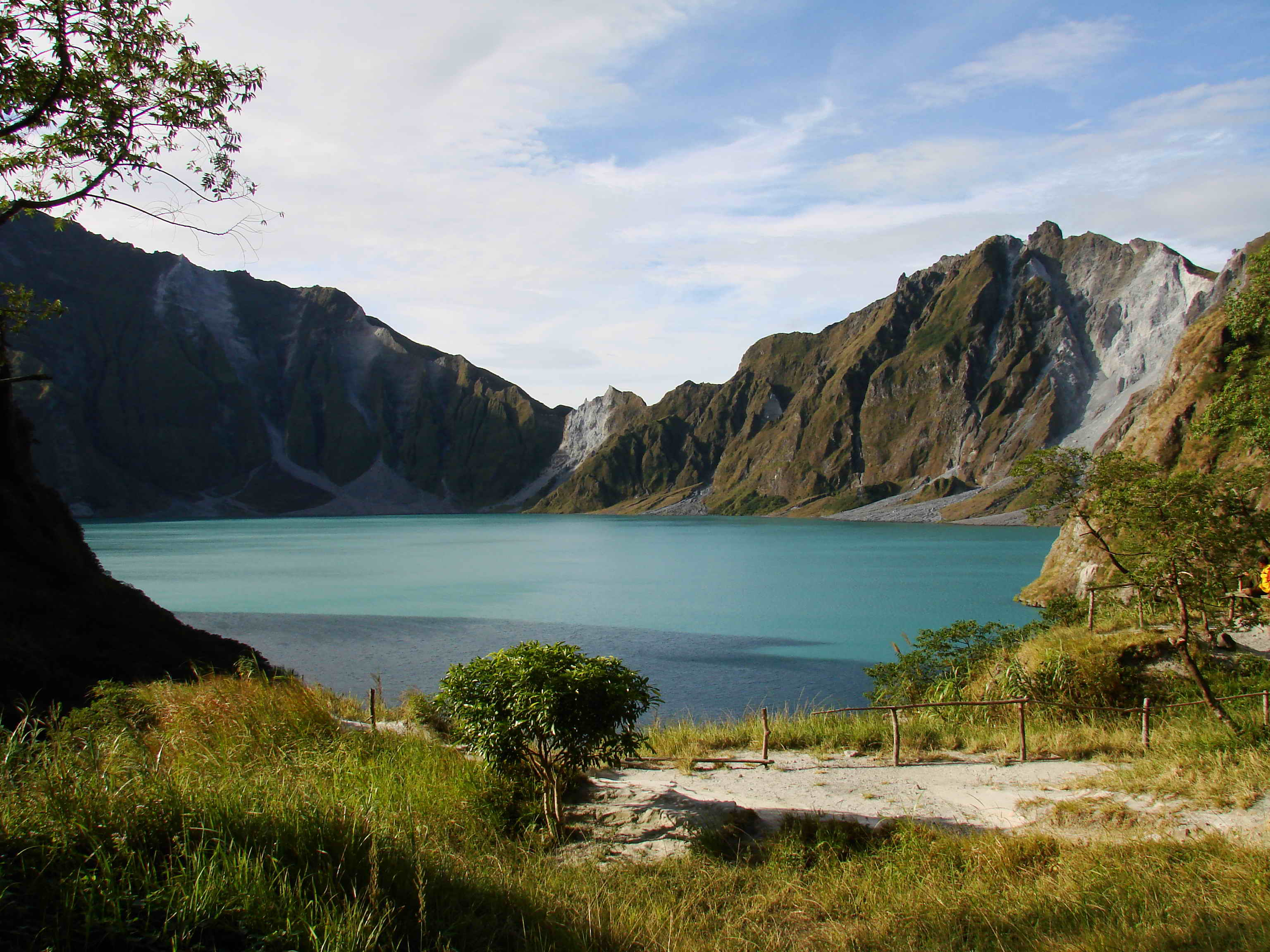
Lake Pinatubo, the crater lake resulting from the 1991 eruption, pictured here in 2008

Activity at the volcano remained low until July 1992 when a new lava dome started growing in the caldera. Volcanologists suspected that further violent eruptions could be possible, and some areas were evacuated. However, the eruption was only minor. The last eruption of Mount Pinatubo took place in 1993.

==== Lake Pinatubo ====
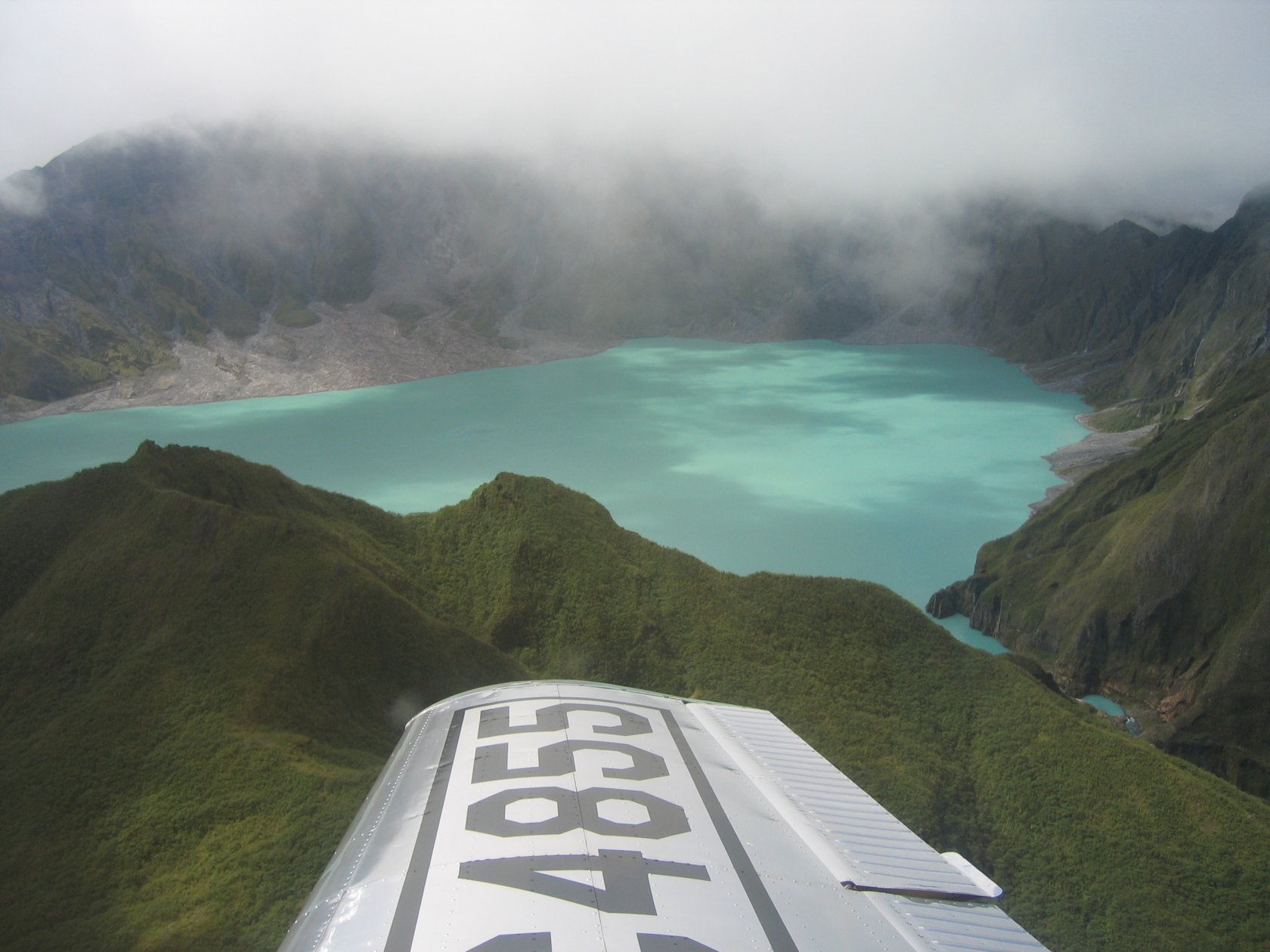
An aerial view of Mt. Pinatubo and Lake Pinatubo in 2006

The 1991 caldera afterwards filled with water from annual monsoon rains and a crater lake, Lake Pinatubo, was formed. In 1992, a growing lava dome formed an island, which was eventually submerged by the lake. Initially, the lake was hot and highly acidic, with a minimum pH of 2 and a temperature of about 40 °C (104 °F). Subsequent rainfall cooled and diluted the lake, lowering the temperature to 26 °C (79 °F) and raising the pH to 5.5 by 2003.

The lake deepened by about 1 meter (3.3 ft) per month on average, eventually submerging the lava dome, until September 2001, when fears that the walls of the crater might be unstable prompted the Philippine government to order a controlled draining of the lake. An estimated 9,000 people were once again evacuated from surrounding areas in case a large flood was accidentally triggered. Workers cut a 5-meter (16 ft) notch in the crater rim and drained about a quarter of the lake's volume.

=== Recent activity ===
The Mount Pinatubo (Drone footage)

On July 10, 2002, the west wall of the crater collapsed, slowly releasing approximately 160 million cubic meters (5.7×10^{9} cu ft) of water and sediment into the Maraunot River in Botolan, Zambales.

On July 26, 2011, a 5.9 magnitude earthquake struck close to Pinatubo; however, no major damages or casualties were reported.

On March 4, 2021, the PHIVOLCS raised Alert Level 1 over Mount Pinatubo after reporting an increase on its seismic activity. Since January 2021, 1,722 volcanic earthquakes have been recorded within the vicinity of the volcano.

On August 12, 2021, PHIVOLCS said it noted a "significant decrease" in volcanic earthquakes, with a total of 104 quakes or an average 2–3 events per day recorded from July 1 to August 1, 2021. The agency also downgraded Mt. Pinatubo's Alert Level 1 to Level 0, due to "continued decrease in earthquake activity and a return to baseline seismic parameters."

On November 30, 2021, PHIVOLCS reported that a weak explosion occurred at Mt. Pinatubo between 12:09 p.m. and 12:13 p.m. (PST), which produced a plume. The agency later confirmed it was a phreatic explosion produced by hydrothermal fluids near the surface, rather than a magmatic eruption.

On August 7, 2025, the Philippine Institute of Volcanology and Seismology (PHIVOLCS) reported that earthquake-monitoring equipment at the San Jose observation station in Tarlac was stolen. The stolen instruments were valued at approximately ₱1.2 million, according to PHIVOLCS.

== Activity monitoring ==
=== Alert levels ===
Pinatubo Volcano Alert Level Scheme
Alert Level	Monitoring Criteria	Interpretation	Recommendations	Step-down Criteria	Alert Level (Step-down)
0 (Normal)	Background parameters: Volcanic earthquakes typically <5/day; Caldera lake CO2 flux <1000 tonnes/day.	Quiescence; no major eruption in foreseeable future	Communities at risk must continue preparedness efforts.		0 (Normal)
1 (Low-level unrest)	Abnormal parameters: Volcanic earthquake clusters along regional faults or lineaments or within the hydrothermal system; Changes in fumarolic activity in the crater; increased crater lake CO2 flux and CO2/H2S ratio changes.	Hydrothermal or local tectonic activity beneath/near the volcano may be occurring; no eruption imminent.	Extreme caution when venturing into the Pinatubo Caldera recommended.	Alert Level 1 monitoring criteria have been in decline for at least one (1) month before lowering to Alert Level 0.	1 (Low-level unrest)
2 (Increasing unrest)	Increasing changes in parameters: Increased and shallowing high-frequency (HF) or volcano-tectonic (VT) earthquake clusters, shallow sporadic low-level tremor with long-period (LP) or low-frequency (LF) events, DLPs (deep long period) events at sub-crustal depths; Continued increases in crater lake CO2 flux and CO2/H2S ratios, significant SO2 emission may be detected; Increased fumarolic activity with discrete weak phreatic eruptions; Ground deformation detected by satellite systems.	Deep-seated magmatic intrusion and/ or increased hydrothermal activity may be occurring, with increased chances of phreatic, gas or hydrothermal explosions; could eventually lead to an eruption.	No entry into Pinatubo Caldera; Preparation of communities in case of escalation of unrest.	Alert Level 2 monitoring criteria have been in decline for one (1) month before lowering to Alert Level 1.	2 (Decreased unrest)
3 (Intensified unrest/Magmatic unrest)	Intensifying changes in parameters: VT/ HF earthquake clusters or swarms within shallow depths of the edifice, increase in the intensity and duration of LP/LF events, DLP clusters at lower crustal depths; Sustained or increasing SO2 emission, increased phreatic activity with explosion-type earthquakes or tremor episodes; Increasing ground deformation or inflation of the edifice.	Certain magmatic intrusion into the shallow magma system or edifice, with higher chances of a major eruption; precursory eruptive activity due to disruption of the hydrothermal system; lava dome growth may occur.	Evacuation of upland communities up to 10 km (62.14 mi) from the summit caldera.	Alert Level 3 monitoring criteria have been in decline for at least two (2) weeks before lowering to Alert Level 2.	3 (Decreased tendency towards hazardous eruption)
4 (Hazardous eruption imminent)	Accelerating changes or abrupt decline in parameters: Strong VT/ HF earthquakes within a few miles depth of the edifice with felt intensities, episodic swarms of hybrid or LP earthquakes, episodic tremor with continuous ash emission, sustained and intensifying volcanic tremor, episodic explosion earthquakes with explosive activity; Increasing incidence and magnitudes of volcanic earthquakes; Successive explosions with pronounced eruption columns and small-volume pyroclastic density currents (PDCs); Intense ground deformation or bulging of the summit region; Abrupt increase or drop in SO2/volcanic gas flux.	Phreatomagmatic or pre-climactic magmatic eruption; If magma ascent rates increase, highly explosive eruption probable within hours to a few days; if magma ascent rates decrease, prolonged lava dome growth may occur.	Evacuation of communities within pre-determined hazard zones for PDCs, heavy ashfall and syn-eruption lahars.	Alert Level 4 monitoring criteria have been in decline for two (2) weeks before lowering to Alert Level 3.	4 (Decreased tendency towards highly hazardous eruption)
5 (Highly hazardous eruption in progress)	Highly explosive magmatic eruption ongoing: Successive explosion-type earthquakes or large-amplitude volcanic tremor and VT earthquakes; Successive or sustained explosions with large eruption column and pronounced umbrella cloud that could exceed 20-km heights above the crater; extensive PDCs emplaced around the edifice; widespread ashfall; syn-eruption lahars	Climactic Subplinian to Plinian eruption; Volcanic hazards expected within 30-km radius of the crater and downwind of the eruption plume.	Evacuation of additional communities, downwind of the eruption plume, along major river systems and in buffer extensions of hazard zones.	Alert Level 5 conditions have ceased for at least 24 hours before lowering to Alert Level 4.	

== Cultural history ==
The word pinatubo could mean "fertile place where one can make crops grow", or could mean "made to grow", in Sambal and Tagalog, which may suggest a knowledge of its previous eruption in about 1500 AD. There is a local oral tradition suggestive of a folk memory of earlier large eruptions. An ancient legend tells of Bacobaco, a terrible spirit of the sea, who could metamorphose into a huge turtle and throw fire from his mouth. In the legend, when being chased by the spirit hunters, Bacobaco flees to the mountain and digs a great hole in its summit showering the surrounding land with rock, mud, dust and fire for three days; howling so loudly that the earth shakes.

=== History among Aetas ===
Aeta elders tell many stories about the history of the mountain, the best known being that it was once a Batung Mabye (Kapampangan language for "living stone"). It was said to have been planted on a kingdom by a displeased sorcerer but relocated by a hero. The mountain was soon turned into the abode of Apo Namalyari ("The lord of happenings/events"), the pagan deity of the Sambal, Aetas and Kapampangans living on the Zambales range.

It was said to comprise the whole mountain range until Sinukuan of Mount Arayat (the god of the Kapampangans) became a strong rival of Namalyari. Their fight, which took place over the center plains, shattered the mountain into smaller bodies and Mount Arayat lost its center peak. Other versions have it that Pinatubo's peak shattered because of Namalyari's immense fury in an attempt to teach humans the meaning of fear and show how misdeeds will be punished.

According to the native elders, Apo Namalyari induced the June 1991 eruption because of displeasure toward illegal loggers and Philippine National Oil Company executives who performed deep exploratory drilling and well testing on the volcano looking for geothermal heat from 1988 to 1990. Discouraging results from the wells forced the abandonment of the prospect 13 months before the April 2, 1991, explosions.

== Aetas granted ownership of Pinatubo ==
After being driven away by the 1991 eruption of Mount Pinatubo, in May 2009 some 454 Aeta families in Pampanga were given the first clean ancestral land ownership on Mount Pinatubo with the Certificate of Ancestral Domain Title (CADT) by the National Commission on Indigenous Peoples (NCIP), the government agency that deals with issues concerning indigenous people of the Philippines. The approved and declared net land area of 7,440.1 ha (18,385 acres) covers the barangays of Mawakat and Nabuklod in Floridablanca, Pampanga, plus a portion of San Marcelino, Zambales, and a portion of Barangay Batiawan in Subic, Zambales.

On January 14, 2010, some 7,000 Aeta families from Zambales were officially granted the Certificate of Ancestral Domain Title (CADT) covering the Zambales side of Pinatubo which includes the summit and Lake Pinatubo, officially becoming their lutan tua (ancestral land). The ancestral domain title covers 15,984 ha (39,500 acres) and includes the villages of Burgos, Villar, Moraza and Belbel in Botolan and portions of the towns of Cabangan, San Felipe and San Marcelino.

Ancestral domain titles are awarded to a certain community or indigenous group who have occupied or possessed the land continuously in accordance with their customs and traditions since time immemorial. They have the legal right to collectively possess and to enjoy the land and its natural resources to the exclusion of others. Having the land title will protect them from others – including foreigners – exploiting their land without compensation to and consent from the indigenous tribes. In the past, the Aetas had to contend with mining companies, loggers, and recently, tourist companies who earn from Mount Pinatubo but do not compensate the local tribes.

== In popular culture ==
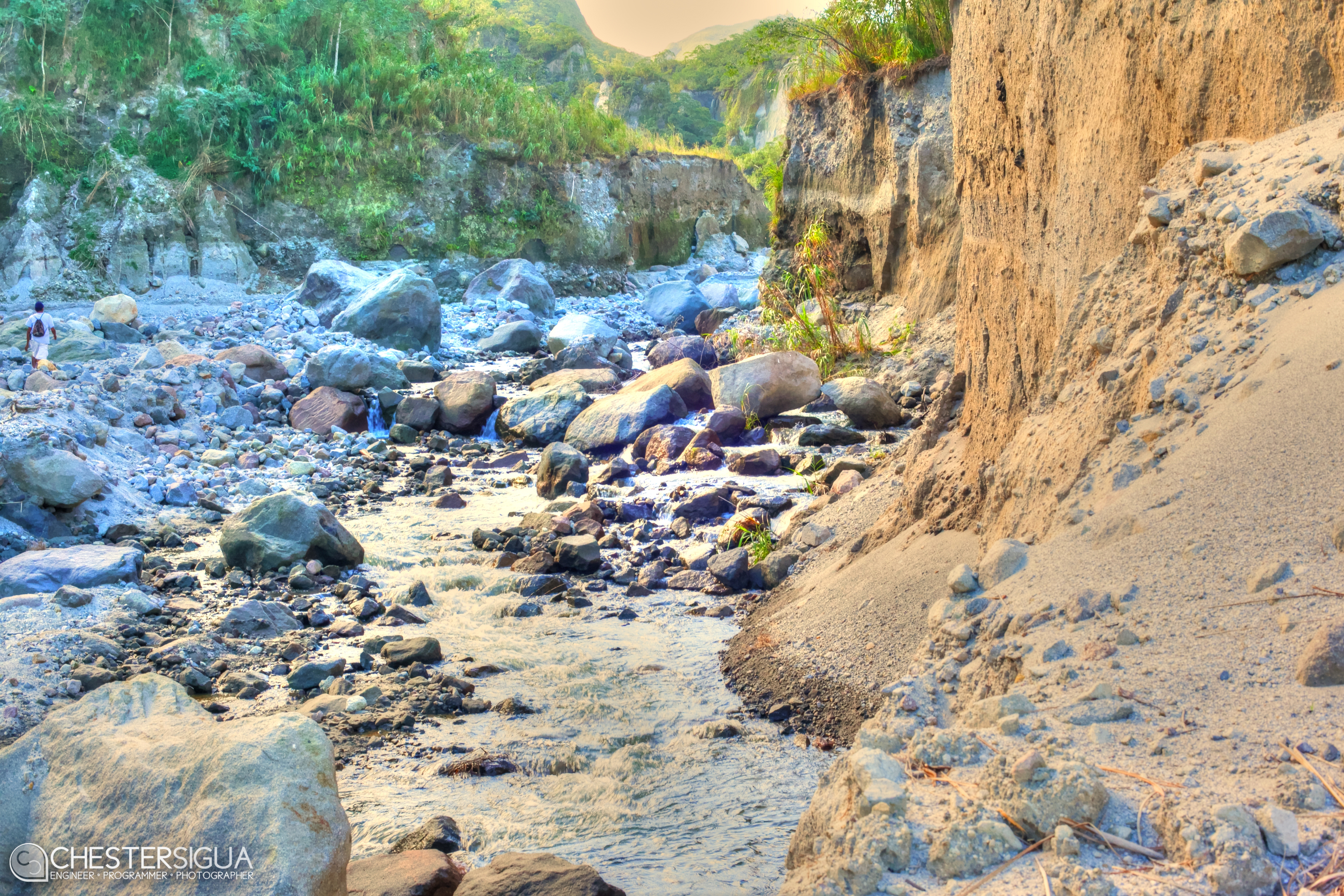
Hiking to Mount Pinatubo's Crater

Long before Mount Pinatubo became famous for its cataclysmic eruption, Philippine president Ramon Magsaysay, a native of Zambales, named his C-47 presidential plane Mt. Pinatubo. The plane crashed into Mount Manunggal in Cebu province in 1957, killing the president and twenty-four others on board.

The shape of Mount Pinatubo's caldera inspired New Clark City Athletics Stadium in Capas, Tarlac.

== Hiking activity ==
Since June 15, 1991, the recent caldera and Lake Pinatubo have become a tourist attraction. The preferred route is through Barangay Santa Juliana in Capas, Tarlac.

In April 2025, Aeta communities held a protest, calling attention to their exclusion from revenues from tourism on Mount Pinatubo. The protesters said that their calls for the NCIP to address the issue had been ignored. Indigenous rights activist Beverly Longid of KATRIBU said that the NCIP has a history of neglecting the Aeta indigenous peoples. Longid stated that there is a need to recognize "the Aeta and their rights over their ancestral land and territory".

== Biodiversity ==
=== Mammals ===
The Long-nosed forest mouse (Apomys sacobianus) is a species of rodent endemic to Mount Pinatubo, Philippines.

The Zambales forest mouse (Apomys zambalensis) is a species of rodent endemic to Zambales Mountain Range, Philippines.

== See also ==
- List of volcanoes in the Philippines
  - List of active volcanoes in the Philippines
  - List of potentially active volcanoes in the Philippines
  - List of inactive volcanoes in the Philippines
- List of volcanic eruptions by death toll
- Timeline of volcanism on Earth
