= Mount Negron =

Mountain in Pampanga, Philippines

- Location within Luzon Location within Philippines

Highest point
- Elevation: 1,584 m (5,197 ft)
- Prominence: 1,154 m (3,786 ft)
- Listing: Ribu
- Coordinates: 15°05′00″N 120°20′00″E

Geography
- Country: Philippines
- Region: Central Luzon
- Province: Pampanga
- Municipality: Porac

Mount Negron, also known as Negron Volcano, is a mountain located in Porac, Pampanga in the region of Central Luzon. It has a height of 1,584 m (5,197 ft) above sea level, making it the highest point in the province of Pampanga. It is located between Mount Pinatubo and Mount Natib. Mount Negron is the part of the Cabusilan Mountains together with Mount Pinatubo, Mount Cuadrado and Mount Mataba.

== Geology ==
In the southeast part of the Philippines, the mountain is located 84 km (52 mi) was Manila, the capital of the Philippines. The highest point was Mount Pinatubo, in the Cabusilan Mountains, the mountain is located 5.7 km (3.54 mi) heading northwest to the volcano.

== Climate and rainfall ==
The average temperature is 23 °C (73 °F), per year, the warmest month is March, at 26 °C (79 °F), and the coldest is December, at 21 °C (70 °F). The wettest month is August, with 941 mm (37.0 in) of rain, and the average rainfall of the mountain is 3,278 mm (129.1 in) per year.

== Eruption ==
There are no historical eruptions in recorded history. However, according to Philippine Institute of Volcanology and Seismology (PHIVOLCS), the mountain is listed as potentially active.
