= Shrew rat =

A shrew rat or shrew-rat is not a true rat but a rodent that resembles a shrew in physical form and, presumably, lifestyle. There are twelve known species distributed across seven known genera (which all belong to either of the murine tribes Rattini or Hydromyini), all from island southeast Asia, specifically the Indonesian island of Sulawesi and several islands of the Philippines:

- Chrotomys, from the Philippines;
  - Isarog striped shrew rat (Chrotomys gonzalesi)
  - Blazed Luzon shrew rat (Chrotomys silaceus)
  - Sibuyan striped shrew rat (Chrotomys sibuyanensis)
- Crunomys, from Sulawesi and the Philippines;
  - Celebes shrew rat (Crunomys celebensis)
  - Northern Luzon shrew rat (Crunomys fallax)
  - Mindanao shrew rat (Crunomys melanius)
- Hyorhinomys, from Sulawesi;
  - Hyorhinomys stuempkei
- Melasmothrix, from Sulawesi;
  - Sulawesian shrew rat (Melasmothrix naso)
- Paucidentomys, from Sulawesi;
  - Paucidentomys vermidax
- Rhynchomys, from the Philippines;
  - Mount Data shrew rat (Rhynchomys soricoides) Thomas, 1895
  - Banahao shrew rat (Rhynchomys banahao) Balete et al., 2007
  - Isarog shrew rat, (Rhynchomys isarogensis) Musser and Freeman, 1981
  - Labo shrew rat (Rhynchomys labo) Rickart et al., 2019
  - Mingan shrew rat (Rhynchomys mingan) Rickart et al., 2019
  - Tapulao shrew rat (Rhynchomys tapulao) Balete et al., 2007
- Tateomys, from Sulawesi.
  - Long-tailed shrew rat (Tateomys macrocercus)
  - Tate's shrew rat (Tateomys rhinogradoides)
