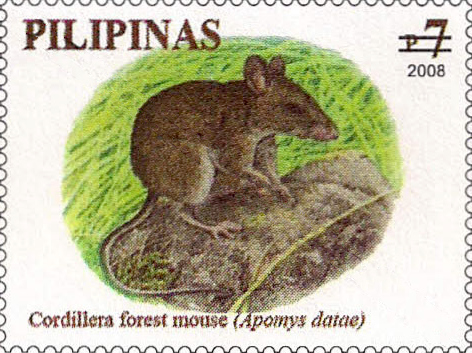

Conservation status
- Least Concern (IUCN 3.1)

Scientific classification
- Kingdom: Animalia
- Phylum: Chordata
- Class: Mammalia
- Order: Rodentia
- Family: Muridae
- Genus: Apomys
- Species: A. datae

Binomial name
- Apomys datae (Meyer, 1899)
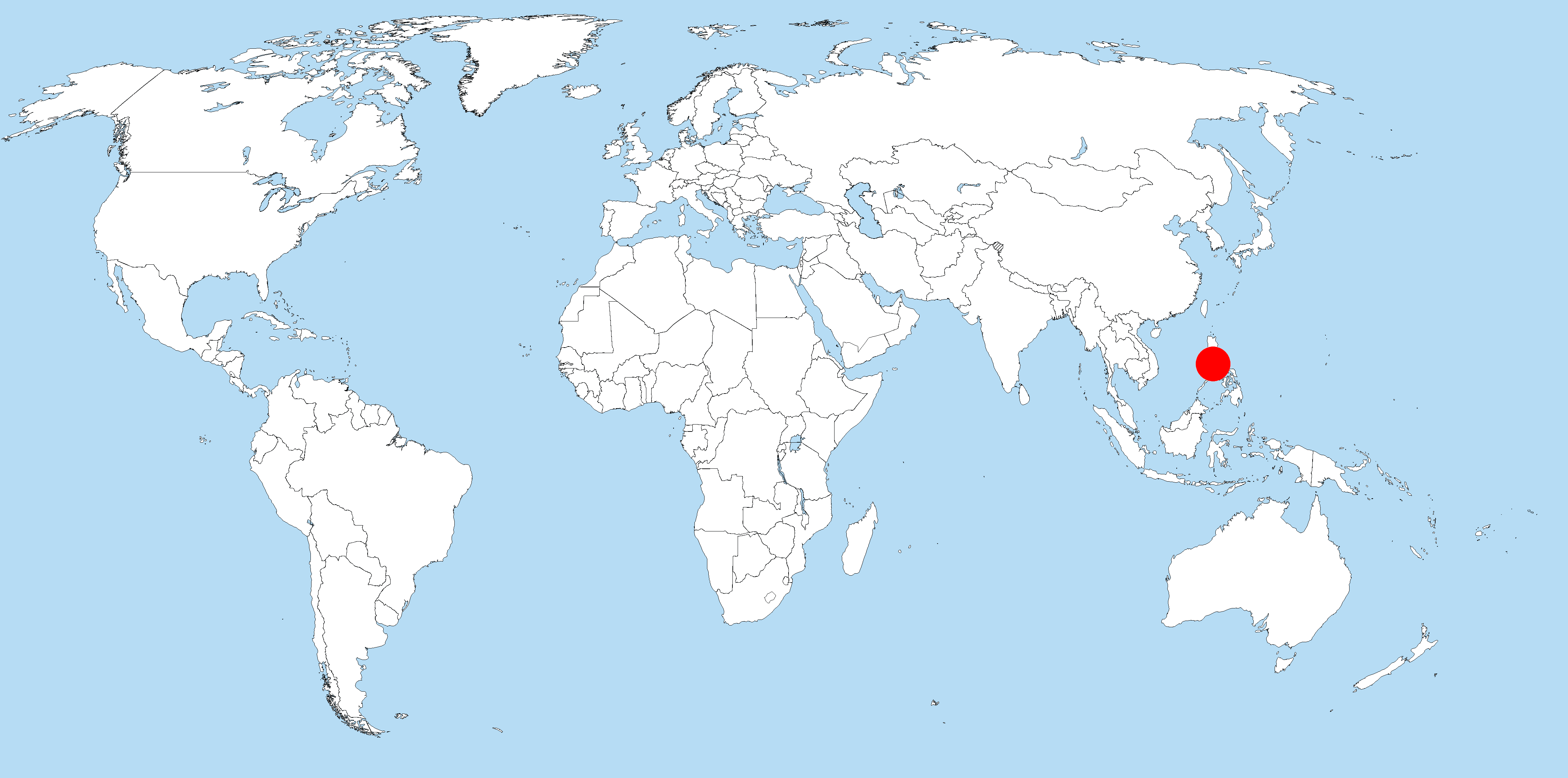
- Range of the Luzon montane forest mouse on global scale
- Range of the Luzon montane forest mouse within the Philippines (blue)

= Luzon montane forest mouse =

Species of rodent

The Luzon montane forest mouse (Apomys datae) is a species of rodent in the family Muridae, from the genus Apomys. It occurs only in the Philippines, where it has been found on the large northern island Luzon (in the Cordillera Central and on the coast of Ilocos Norte). It is most closely related to the large Mindoro forest mouse, which occurs on Mindoro. There may be another related species in the Sierra Madre, but this species is yet undescribed. The Luzon montane forest mouse is a relatively large, ground-dwelling rat with a tail that is quite short for its genus.

== Description ==
The Luzon montane forest mouse is a large, thickset species with a tail that is about the same length as the body. The soft, thick dorsal fur is dark brown, while the ventral side of the body is a cream white. The hind feet are partly brown in colour on the dorsal side, but otherwise white. The tail is brown on the dorsal side, and a cream white ventrally. The animal has a large skull with a square-shaped neurocranium. Some of its skull characteristics are so special that they set the animal apart from most every other species of Apomys. One specimen has a head-torso-length of 143 mm, a tail length of 144 mm and a hind feet length of 34 mm. The specimens captured by Sanborn on Mount Data have a mean skull length of 39.2 mm (37.0 to 40.6 mm with a standard deviation of 1.1 mm). The Luzon montane forest mouse's holotype has a skull length of 39.9 mm; that of A. major has a length of 38.4 mm.

== Evolution and phylogenetic relationships ==
The Luzon montane forest mouse belongs to the Chrotomys division, a group within the Murinae that occurs exclusively on the Philippines, and in addition to Apomys, also includes Rhynchomys, Chrotomys and Archboldomys. Animals in this division share several morphological and genetic features.

In 2003, a phylogenetic study was published which compared DNA sequences from the cytochrome b gene of thirteen species of Apomys. This study confirmed the proposed relationship between the large Mindoro forest mouse (A. gracilirostris) and the Luzon montane forest mouse (A. datae), as well as the status of the datae group as a sister group of the other species of Apomys.

The phylogenetic relationships of the Luzon montane forest mouse can be summarized as follows.

- Chrotomys division
  - - Apomys
      - datae group
        - Apomys gracilirostris
        - Apomys datae
      - abrae-hylocetes group (other species)
  - - Rhynchomys
    - Chrotomys
    - Archboldomys

According to this study, the split between the Luzon montane forest mouse and the large Mindoro forest mouse took place some three million years ago, as calculated using a molecular clock, putting it in the Pliocene. It was also estimated that Apomys dates back more than four million years, with the Chromotys division being again more ancient by another two million years. Another study concluded that the Chromotys division was older still, at more than ten million years, and that the split between the Chromotys division and its closest relatives, a predominantly African group including Mus, Otomys and Mastomys, took place some sixteen million years ago.
