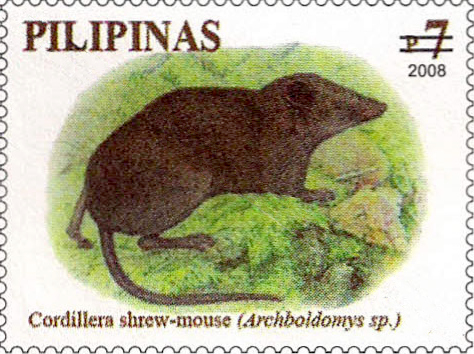

Conservation status
- Least Concern (IUCN 3.1)

Scientific classification
- Kingdom: Animalia
- Phylum: Chordata
- Class: Mammalia
- Order: Rodentia
- Family: Muridae
- Genus: Soricomys
- Species: S. kalinga

Binomial name
- Soricomys kalinga Balete, Rickart & Heaney, 2006
- Distribution of S. kalinga (orange)

Synonyms
- Archboldomys kalinga

= Kalinga shrew mouse =

Species of rodent

The Kalinga shrew mouse (Soricomys kalinga) is a rodent of the genus Soricomys found in the northern province of Kalinga, island of Luzon, in the northern Philippines.

== Distribution and habitat ==
S. kalinga was first found in Magdallao on March 30, 2000, at 1,600 metres (5,200 ft) elevation. Until April 4, there were four males and two females caught. From 19 and 25 March 2001, another four males and two females were added on the site-Am licao, at 1,800 m (5,900 ft) altitude. Between 22 and 25 February 2003, two males and three females gathered on Mount Bali-it at 1,950 m (6,400 ft) altitude, and between February 27 and March 2, 2003, four males and one female were found on 2,150 m (7,050 ft) altitude. All of these sites are located in the barangays (municipalities) of Balbalasang and Balbalan on 17° 25 – 28' N and 121° 4' – 122° 0' E. Habitats where it was found include montane forest and mossy forest, both primary forests and secondary growth.

S. kalinga is the representative of its genus, Soricomys, in the northern part of the Cordillera Central of Luzon, and is found throughout the region. This genus also occurs in the Sierra Madre (A. musseri) and Mount Isarog (A. luzonensis). In other mountainous areas of Luzon, including the southern part of the Cordillera Central, the genus is unknown to date.

The species is active during daylight hours. Its diet consists primarily of invertebrate animals, including earthworms and insects.

== Description ==
Like all Soricomys, S. kalinga is a small ground-dwelling, pointed shrew rat with small ears and slender feet. The tail length is slightly smaller than the head-body length. The fur is as thick as the other two types, but shorter. The top side of the body is orange-brown and continues gradually into the lighter underside. The hairs on the top of the body are tricolor: three quarters are dark gray, then there comes a black piece, and the point is orange. On the underside of the body, the hair is shorter and all areas are paler. The small ears are round and black. The naked skin of the lips and the nose are dark gray. The light gray whiskers are quite short, though they are longer than the other species.

The front feet are dark gray and black and nude from the top and the lower side. On the underside of the feet are five cusps. The dark fingers have long narrow claws following a short nail on the thumb. The top of hind feet are brownish gray and covered with sparse short hairs, with darker fingers. The relatively long tail is completely black.
