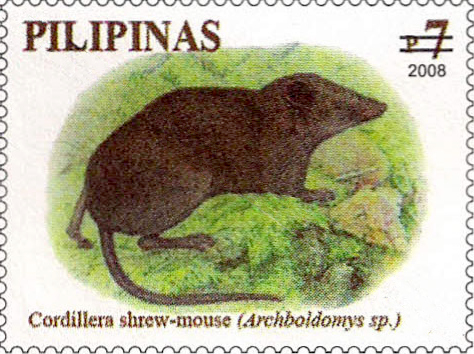

Scientific classification
- Kingdom: Animalia
- Phylum: Chordata
- Class: Mammalia
- Order: Rodentia
- Family: Muridae
- Tribe: Hydromyini
- Genus: Soricomys; Balete, Rickart, Heaney, Alviola, M. V. Duya, M. R. M. Duya, Sosa, and Jansa, 2012

Species
- Soricomys kalinga Soricomys leonardocoi Soricomys montanus Soricomys musseri

= Soricomys =

Genus of rodents

Soricomys, the shrew-mice, are a genus of rodents in the family Muridae. They are carnivores that feed on invertebrates much like shrews do. An apparently smaller relatives of the true shrew-rats Chrotomys and Rhynchomys, Soricomys are somewhat convergent to the more distantly related Crunomys.

The species are:

- Soricomys kalinga
- Co's shrew mouse, Soricomys leonardocoi
- Southern Cordillera shrew mouse, Soricomys montanus
- Sierra Madre shrew mouse, Soricomys musseri

S. kalinga was only discovered on March 30, 2000, and described in 2006.
