= Nonsense verse =

Form of nonsense literature

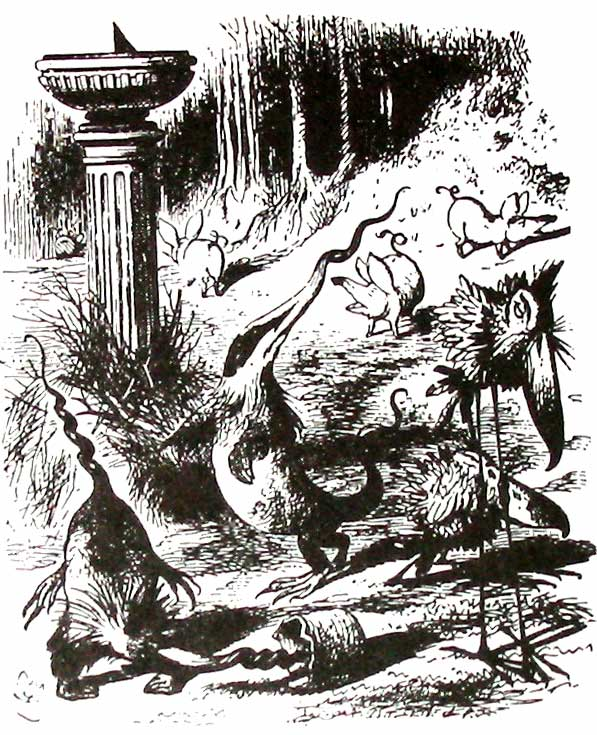
John Tenniel's depiction of the nonsense creatures in Lewis Carroll's Jabberwocky.

Nonsense verse is a form of nonsense literature usually employing strong prosodic elements like rhythm and rhyme. It is often whimsical and humorous in tone and employs some of the techniques of nonsense literature.

Limericks are probably the best known form of nonsense verse, although they tend nowadays to be used for straightforward humour, rather than having a nonsensical effect.

Among writers in English noted for nonsense verse are Edward Lear, Lewis Carroll, Mervyn Peake, Edward Gorey, Colin West, Dr. Seuss, and Spike Milligan. The Martian Poets and Ivor Cutler are considered by some to be in the nonsense tradition.

== Origins ==
Nonsense verse is usually considered to have originated in Britain in the beginning of the 19th century. Edward Lear's "Book of Nonsense" is one of the earliest examples, published in 1846.

== Variants ==
In some cases, the humor of nonsense verse relies on the incompatibility of phrases which make grammatical sense but semantic nonsense – at least in certain interpretations – as in the traditional:

'I see' said the blind man to his deaf and dumb daughter
as he picked up his hammer and saw.

Compare amphigory.

Other nonsense verse makes use of nonsense words—words without a clear meaning or any meaning at all. Lewis Carroll and Edward Lear both made use of this type of nonsense effectively in some of their verse. These poems are well formed in terms of grammar and syntax, and each nonsense word is of a clear part of speech. The first verse of Lewis Carroll's "Jabberwocky" illustrates this nonsense technique, despite Humpty Dumpty's later clear explanation of some of the unclear words within it:

'Twas brillig, and the slithy toves
Did gyre and gimble in the wabe:
All mimsy were the borogoves,
And the mome raths outgrabe.

Other nonsense verse uses muddled or ambiguous grammar as well as invented words, as in John Lennon's "The Faulty Bagnose":

The Mungle pilgriffs far awoy
Religeorge too thee worled.
Sam fells on the waysock-side
And somforbe on a gurled,
With all her faulty bagnose!

Here, awoy fills the place of "away" in the expression "far away", but also suggests the exclamation "ahoy", suitable to a voyage. Likewise, worled and gurled suggest "world" and "girl" but have the -ed form of a past-tense verb. "Somforbe" could possibly be a noun, possibly a slurred verb phrase. In the sense that it is a slurred verb, it could be the word "stumbled", as in Sam fell onto the drunk side and stumbled on a girl.

However, not all nonsense verse relies on word play. Some simply illustrate nonsensical situations. For instance, Edward Lear's poem, "The Jumblies" has a comprehensible chorus:

Far and few, far and few,
Are the lands where the Jumblies live;
Their heads are green, and their hands are blue
And they went to sea in a sieve.

However, the significance of the color of the heads and hands is not apparent and the verse appears to be nonsense.

Some nonsense verse simply presents contradictory or impossible scenarios in a matter-of-fact tone, like this example from Brian P. Cleary's Rainbow Soup: Adventures in Poetry (Millbrook Press, 2004):

One tall midget reached up high,
Touched the ground above the sky,
Tied his loafers, licked his tongue,
And told about the bee he stung.
He painted, then, an oval square
The color of the bald man's hair,
And in the painting you could hear
What's undetected by the ear.

Likewise, a poem sometimes attributed to Christopher Isherwood and first found in the anthology Poems Past and Present (Harold Dew, 1946 edition, J M Dent & Sons, Canada – attributed to "Anon") makes grammatical and semantic sense and yet lies so earnestly and absurdly that it qualifies as complete nonsense:

The common cormorant or shag
Lays eggs inside a paper bag
The reason you will see no doubt
It is to keep the lightning out
But what these unobservant birds
Have failed to notice is that herds
Of wandering bears may come with buns
And steal the bags to hold the crumbs.

More contemporary examples of nonsense verse include the Vogon poetry from Douglas Adams's The Hitchhiker's Guide to the Galaxy, and the 1972 song "Prisencolinensinainciusol" by Italian multi-talent Adriano Celentano.

== Other languages ==
Russian nonsense poets include Daniil Kharms and Aleksey Konstantinovich Tolstoy, particularly his work under the pseudonym Kozma Prutkov, and some French exponents are Charles Cros and Robert Desnos. The best-known Dutch nonsense poet is Cees Buddingh'. In Bengali, Sukumar Roy is a pioneer of nonsense poems and is famous for writing children's literature. Abol Tabol is the best collection of nonsense verse in Bengali.

Among German nonsense writers, Christian Morgenstern and Ringelnatz are the most widely known, and are both still popular, while Robert Gernhardt is a contemporary example. Morgenstern's "Das Nasobēm" is an imaginary being like the Jabberwock, although less frightful:

Auf seinen Nasen schreitet
einher das Nasobēm,
von seinem Kind begleitet.
Es steht noch nicht im Brehm.
Es steht noch nicht im Meyer.
Und auch im Brockhaus nicht.
Es trat aus meiner Leyer
zum ersten Mal ans Licht.
Auf seinen Nasen schreitet
(wie schon gesagt) seitdem,
von seinem Kind begleitet,
einher das Nasobēm.

Translation:

Upon its noses strideth
Onward the Noseybum,
With it its young abideth.
It's not yet found in Brehm.
It's not yet found in Meyer.
And neither in Brockhaus.
It trotted from my lyre,
Its first time in the light.
Upon its noses strideth
(As said before) thencefrom,
With it its young abideth,
Onward the Noseybum.

The following observation by F.W. Bernstein has practically become a German proverb.

Die schärfsten Kritiker der Elche
waren früher selber welche

Translation:

The sharpest critics of the elks
used to be ones themselves

Julio Cortázar, the Argentine writer, was famous for playing with language in several works.

In Chinese, there is a special variation of nonsense verses called 颠倒歌 diāndǎo gē (upside down songs). They tend to make things happen the opposite way to what makes sense, for example:

Simplified characters	Traditional characters	Pinyin	Bopomofo	Literal translation
吃牛奶	吃牛奶	chī niú nǎi	ㄔ ㄋㄧㄡˊ ㄋㄞˇ	I ate the milk,
喝面包	喝麵包	hē miàn bāo	ㄏㄜ ㄇㄧㄢˋ ㄅㄠ	Drank the bread,
夹起火车上皮包	夾起火車上皮包	jiā qǐ huǒ chē shàng pí bāo	ㄐㄧㄚ ㄑㄧˇ ㄏㄨㄛˇ ㄔㄜ ㄕㄤˋ ㄆㄧˊ ㄅㄠ	Clung on my train just to catch up the purse;
东西街	東西街	dōng xī jiē	ㄉㄨㄥ ㄒㄧ ㄐㄧㄝ	On the east–west street,
南北走	南北走	nán běi zǒu	ㄋㄢˊ ㄅㄟˇ ㄗㄡˇ	I walked north–south;
看见一个人咬狗	看見一個人咬狗	kàn jiàn yī gè rén yǎo gǒu	ㄎㄢˋ ㄐㄧㄢˋ ㄧ ㄍㄜˋ ㄖㄣˊ ㄧㄠˇ ㄍㄡˇ	I saw a person biting a dog,
捡起狗来打砖头	撿起狗來打磚頭	jiǎn qǐ gǒu lái dǎ zhuān tóu	ㄐㄧㄢˇ ㄑㄧˇ ㄍㄡˇ ㄌㄞˊ ㄉㄚˇ ㄓㄨㄢ ㄊㄡˊ	He picked up the dog to beat a brick,
反被砖头咬一口	反被磚頭咬一口	fǎn bèi zhuān tóu yǎo yī kǒu	ㄈㄢˇ ㄅㄟˋ ㄓㄨㄢ ㄊㄡˊ ㄧㄠˇ ㄧ ㄎㄡˇ	Only to get bitten by the brick.

== See also ==
- Clanging
- Doggerel
- Light verse
- Literary nonsense
- Pseudo-anglicism
