= Masson (publisher) =

French publisher

- Industry: Publisher
- Genre: Medical and scientific literature
- Founded: 1802
- Defunct: 2005
- Fate: Merged with Elsevier France
- Headquarters: Paris, France
- Website: www.elsevier-masson.fr

Masson was a French publisher which specialized principally in medical and scientific books and journals. It also published textbooks for secondary and tertiary education.

== Company history ==
In 1802, Nicolas Crochard set up as a printer and bookseller in Paris in association with Pierre-Antoine-Louis Allut. In 1804, Crochard continued the business on his own and from 1807, he specialised in scientific and medical publishing. In 1826, he passed the business to his son Eugène Crochard, who from 1835. would run the business with Victor Masson (1807–1879). In 1846, Masson became the sole proprietor of the firm under the name La Librairie Victor Masson.

The ownership of the firm was passed to his son, Georges Masson (1839–1900), who in 1900 passed the firm to Pierre-Victor Masson (1865–1928). In the 1930s, Georges Masson (1900–1973) ran the company. Over the years the firm's name changed to Victor Masson & fils and then in 1896 to Librairie Masson et Compagnie (Masson & Cie).

In 1987, Masson purchased Armand Colin. In turn, it became part of the City Group (Groupe de la Cité) in 1994. In 2000, Groupe de la Cité became part of Vivendi Universal Publishing (VUP). VUP sold its medical and trade publishing to a group led by Cinven in 2002, who formed MediMedia. In 2005, MediMedia sold its European and U.S. Netter professional medical publishing businesses to Reed Elsevier. Masson merged with Elsevier France, creating Elsevier Masson. The company has been managed by Daniel Rodriguez since 2013.

== Notable publications ==
- Dictionnaire encyclopédique des sciences médicales (1864–89)
- E. Brissaud, A. Pinard and P. Reclus, Nouvelle pratique médico-chirurgicale illustrée: Chirurgie, médecine, obstétrique, thérapeutique, dermatologie etc. (8 volumes, 1911–12)
- G. H. Roger and Léon Binet, Traité de Physiologie normale et pathologique (11 volumes, 1925)
- Gerolf Steiner, Anatomie et biologie des rhinogrades: Un nouvel ordre de mammifères (1962) — Masson's French language translation of a book about a fictitious order called the Rhinogradentia
- Marcel Brombart and Henri Monges, Atlas de radiologie clinique du tube digestif (1964)
- Manuel diagnostique et statistique des troubles mentaux (DSM) (1983— ) — "la bible des psychiatres" — French, Italian and Spanish editions published by Masson
- Masson French-English Medical Dictionary in electronic form for the Macintosh and Microsoft Windows computer platforms (published in association with the language software company Ultralingua, 2000)

== Book series ==
=== 19th century ===
- Bibliothèque Polytechnique

=== 20th century ===
- Collection des précis médicaux (78 monographs by 1914)

Many new titles published as medical knowledge evolved, such as:

- Cahiers de médecine
- Cahiers de psychothérapie
- Cahiers de radiologie
- Cahiers de l’infirmière

=== 21st century ===
Some of the 107 series available in 2005 were:

- Abrégés de médecine
- Abrégés de pharmacie
- Accès santé
- Aide-mémoire
- Atlas pratiques de médecine
- Bibliothèque clinique psychanalytique
- Dictionnaires pratiques
- Expliquez-moi docteur
- Imagerie radiologique
- Pour le praticien
- Savoir et pratique infirmière
