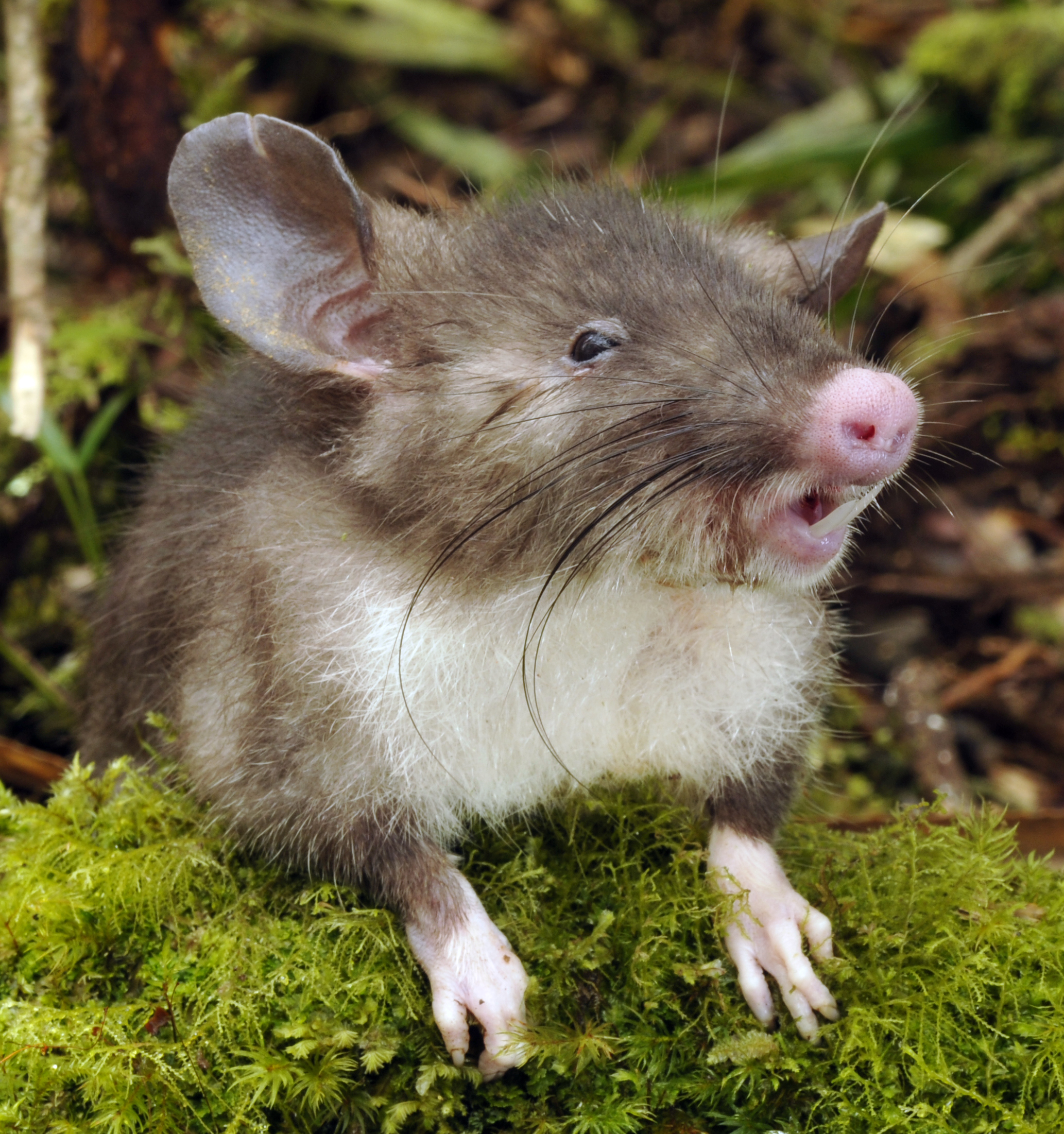

Conservation status
- Data Deficient (IUCN 3.1)

Scientific classification
- Kingdom: Animalia
- Phylum: Chordata
- Class: Mammalia
- Order: Rodentia
- Family: Muridae
- Subfamily: Murinae
- Tribe: Rattini
- Genus: Hyorhinomys; Esselstyn, Achmadi, Handika, & Rowe, 2015
- Species: H. stuempkei

Binomial name
- Hyorhinomys stuempkei Esselstyn, Achmadi, Handika, & Rowe, 2015

= Hyorhinomys =

Monospecific genus of rodent

Hyorhinomys stuempkei, the hog-nosed shrew rat or Sulawesi snouter, is a species of rodent in the family Muridae, more specifically in the subfamily Murinae, endemic to Sulawesi, Indonesia. It is the only species assigned to the genus Hyorhinomys. This species was discovered in 2015 by Jacob A. Esselstyn and his team, Anang S. Achmadi, Heru Handika, and Kevin C. Rowe. Esselstyn proposed "Sulawesi snouter" as a common name for it. The word "snouter" references the spoof biological text The Snouters: Form and Life of the Rhinogrades, authored by the German zoologist Gerolf Steiner as the fictional naturalist "Harald Stümpke". H. stuempkei pays homage to this fictional individual.

It is known only from Mount Dako in Tolitoli Regency, Central Sulawesi, Indonesia.

The species has particularly long incisors. Unusually, it lacks the coronoid process jaw muscle attachment point, presumably because its diet of earthworms and beetle larvae does not require forceful chewing.

Its morphological distinctions from other shrew rats, along with phylogenetic analysis, led to it being placed in the new genus Hyorhinomys as the only species.
