= Isarog striped shrew-rat =

Conservation status
- Near Threatened (IUCN 3.1)

Scientific classification
- Kingdom: Animalia
- Phylum: Chordata
- Class: Mammalia
- Order: Rodentia
- Family: Muridae
- Genus: Chrotomys
- Species: C. gonzalesi

Binomial name
- Chrotomys gonzalesi Rickart & Heaney, 1991
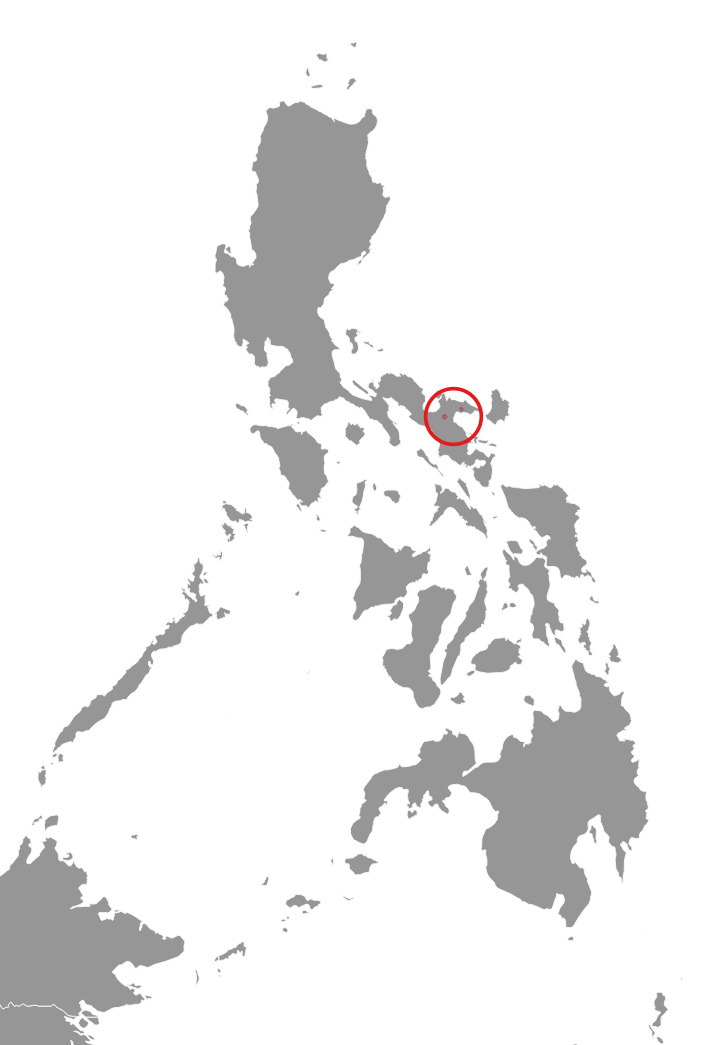

Species of rodent

The Isarog striped shrew-rat or Mount Isarog striped rat (Chrotomys gonzalesi) is a species of rodent in the family Muridae found only in the Philippines.

== Taxonomy ==
The Isarog striped shrew-rat (Chrotomys gonzalesi) was first described in 1991 by Eric A. Rickart and Lawrence R. Heaney, based on specimens collected in a 1988 survey. The type locality is the "western slope of Mount Isarog", at an elevation of 1,350 metres (4,430 ft). It was named for Pedro C. Gonzales, a Filipino naturalist.

== Description ==
The Isarog striped shrew-rat is medium-sized. Within the genus, it is between Chrotomys whiteheadi and C. mindorensis in size. The tail is about 56% of the full length, on average. The fur is notably darker than other species in the genus and "soft, dense, and fluffy". The back fur is "shiny black, with faint brown highlights", and some individuals have a pale stripe of fur down the center of the back starting at the head; in some cases it extends to the base of the tail while in others it ends at the upper back. The belly and underparts are "dark grey, faintly washed with grayish buff", and some individuals have a white blaze on the chest.

A genetic analysis in 2005 found that it was most closely related to Chrotomys whiteheadi among the species in the genus.

== Distribution, ecology, and conservation ==
The Isarog striped shrew-rat has only been confirmed from the type locality of Mount Isarog, on Luzon island in the Philippines, at elevations between 1,350 metres (4,430 ft) to 1,800 metres (5,900 ft). One individual found near Saddle Peak has not been definitively identified but may be an Isarog striped shrew-rat. The range may extend to other parts of the Bicol Peninsula, but surveys of small mammals on several mountains in the region did not find any individuals.

The specie's habitat consists of mountainous oak forests. They are partially fossorial and eat primarily earthworms as well as other insects.

It is considered Near Threatened by the IUCN Red List due to its limited range, but the species population is stable. The habitat is located within a protected area and is not at significant risk from human activity due to the high elevation. At lower elevations, some parts of its habitat are threatened by abaca farming.
