= Large Cordillera shrew-mouse =

Conservation status
- Data Deficient (IUCN 3.1)

Scientific classification
- Kingdom: Animalia
- Phylum: Chordata
- Class: Mammalia
- Order: Rodentia
- Family: Muridae
- Genus: Archboldomys
- Species: A. maximus

Binomial name
- Archboldomys maximus Balete, Rickart, Heaney, Alviola, M. R. M. Duya, M. V. Duya, Sosa & Jansa, 2012

Species of rodent

The large Cordillera shrew-mouse (Archboldomys maximus) is a species of rodent in the family Muridae found only in the Philippines.
