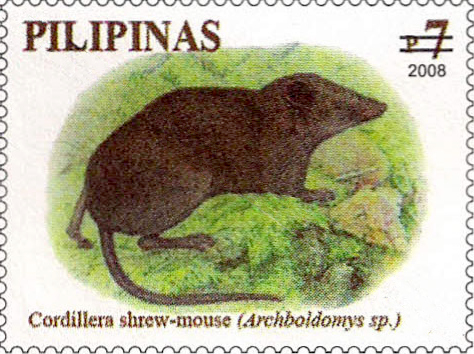

Scientific classification
- Kingdom: Animalia
- Phylum: Chordata
- Class: Mammalia
- Order: Rodentia
- Family: Muridae
- Tribe: Hydromyini
- Genus: Archboldomys; Musser, 1982

Species
- Archboldomys luzonensis Archboldomys maximus

= Archboldomys =

Genus of rodents

Archboldomys, the shrew-mice, are a genus of rodents in the family Muridae. They are carnivores that feed on invertebrates much like shrews do. An apparently smaller relatives of the true shrew-rats Chrotomys and Rhynchomys, Archboldomys are somewhat convergent to the more distantly related Crunomys.

The species are:

- Mount Isarog shrew-mouse, Archboldomys luzonensis
- Large Cordillera shrew-mouse, Archboldomys maximus
