= Christian Morgenstern =

German author and poet (1871–1914)

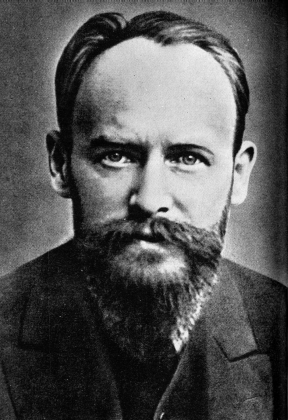
- Born: Christian Otto Josef Wolfgang Morgenstern; 6 May 1871; Munich
- Died: 31 March 1914 (aged 42); Meran
- Occupations: Poet; Author

Christian Otto Josef Wolfgang Morgenstern (6 May 1871 – 31 March 1914) was a German writer and poet from Munich. Morgenstern married Margareta Gosebruch von Liechtenstern on 7 March 1910. He worked for a while as a journalist in Berlin, but spent much of his life traveling through Germany, Switzerland, and Italy, primarily in a vain attempt to recover his health. His travels, though they failed to restore him to health, allowed him to meet many of the foremost literary and philosophical figures of his time in central Europe.

== Poetry ==
Morgenstern's poetry, much of which was inspired by English literary nonsense, is immensely popular, even though he enjoyed very little success during his lifetime. He made fun of scholasticism, e.g. literary criticism in "Drei Hasen", grammar in "Der Werwolf", narrow-mindedness in "Der Gaul", and symbolism in "Der Wasseresel". In "Scholastikerprobleme" he discussed how many angels could sit on a needle. Still many Germans know some of his poems and quotations by heart, e.g. the following line from "The Impossible Fact" ("Die unmögliche Tatsache", 1910):

Weil, so schließt er messerscharf / Nicht sein kann, was nicht sein darf.
"For, he reasons pointedly / That which must not, can not be."

Embedded in his humorous poetry is a subtle metaphysical streak, as e.g. in "Vice Versa", (1905):

Ein Hase sitzt auf einer Wiese,
des Glaubens, niemand sähe diese.
Doch im Besitze eines Zeißes
betrachtet voll gehaltnen Fleißes
vom vis-à-vis gelegnen Berg
ein Mensch den kleinen Löffelzwerg.
Ihn aber blickt hinwiederum
ein Gott von fern an, mild und stumm.

"A rabbit in his meadow lair
Imagines none to see him there.
But aided by a looking lens
A man with eager diligence
Inspects the tiny long-eared gnome
From a convenient near-by dome.
Yet him surveys, or so we learn
A god from far off, mild and stern."

Gerolf Steiner's mock-scientific book about the fictitious animal order Rhinogradentia (1961), inspired by Morgenstern's nonsense poem Das Nasobēm, is testament to his enduring popularity.

Morgenstern was a member of the General Anthroposophical Society. Dr. Rudolf Steiner called him 'a true representative of Anthroposophy'.

Morgenstern died in 1914 of tuberculosis, which he had contracted from his mother, who died in 1881.

=== Gallows Songs ===
Morgenstern's best known works are the Galgenlieder (Gallows Songs, 1905). This volume of humorous verses was followed by Palmström in 1910. Published posthumously were the important companion volumes Palma Kunkel in 1916, Der Gingganz in 1919, and Alle Galgenlieder in 1932. In German these works have gone through dozens of different editions and reprints and sold hundreds of thousands of copies.

== Morgenstern as translator ==
Christian Morgenstern was also an acclaimed translator, rendering into German various prominent works from Norwegian and French, including the dramas and poems of Henrik Ibsen, Knut Hamsun, Bjørnstjerne Bjørnson and August Strindberg.

== Musical settings ==
Morgenstern's poems have been set to music by composers such as Erik Bergman (four Galgenlieder, Das große Lalula, Tapetenblume, Igel und Agel, Unter Zeiten), Hanns Eisler, Sofia Gubaidulina, Lera Auerbach, Paul Graener, Friedrich Gulda, Paul Hindemith, Robert Kahn, Yrjö Kilpinen, Margarete Schweikert, Matyas Seiber (Two Madrigals and Three Morgenstern Lieder for soprano and clarinet), Rudi Spring (Galgenliederbuch nach Gedichten von Christian Morgenstern op. 19), Siegfried Strohbach (5 Galgenlieder), Graham Waterhouse (Gruselett, Der Werwolf), Timothy Hoekman ("Der Werwolf" in Drei Legenden) and Alexander von Zemlinsky (Es waren zwei Kinder, Vöglein Schwermut, Der Abend, Abendkelch voll Sonnenlicht, Du gabst mir deine Kette and Auf dem Meere meiner Seele), Andres Condon (CD Corazon de Aguila) and Meinrad Kneer (Meinrad Kneer's Phosphoros Ensemble plays Christian Morgenstern).

== Essays, reviews and aphorisms ==
In his early years Christian Morgenstern wrote a considerable number of essays and reviews for various German periodicals. They have been collected together and published in Volume 6 (Kritische Schriften, 1987) of the German collected works of Morgenstern. His philosophical and mythical works were largely influenced by the philosopher Friedrich Nietzsche, the Austrian educationalist Rudolf Steiner (the originator of anthroposophy and the Waldorf school movement), and the Russian writers Fyodor Dostoyevsky and Leo Tolstoy.

Perhaps Morgenstern's most philosophical volume is a collection of aphorisms published posthumously in 1918 entitled Stufen: Eine Entwickelung in Aphorismen und Tagebuch-Notizen (Stages: A Development in Aphorisms and Diary Notes). It has given rise to a number of celebrated quotations. These include:

- "Home isn't where our house is, but wherever we are understood."
- "I shall excavate the strata of my soul."
- "I'm a man of limits: forever physically, emotionally, morally and artistically on the brink of plunging into the abyss. Yet I manage to keep my balance and possess presence of mind."
- "I bear no treasures within me. I only possess the power to transform much of what I touch into something of value. I have no depths, save my incessant desire for the depths." (Translated by David W. Wood)

== Collected works ==
A complete edition of the works of Christian Morgenstern in German in nine volumes is currently being prepared by Verlag Urachhaus (Stuttgart) under the direction of Professor Reinhardt Habel. Volumes 1 and 2 comprise Morgenstern's lyrical writings and poems; volume 3: humoristic writings, including the complete Gallows Songs; volume 4: epic and theatrical writings; volume 5: collected aphorisms; volume 6: critical essays and reviews; volumes 7-9: complete correspondence. The volume titles in German are:

- Volume 1: Lyrik 1887–1905, ed. Martin Kiessig, 1988.
- Volume 2: Lyrik 1906–1914, ed. Martin Kiessig, 1992.
- Volume 3: Humoristische Lyrik, ed. Maurice Cureau, 1990.
- Volume 4: Episches und Dramatisches, eds. Reinhardt Habel and Ernst Kretschmer, 2001.
- Volume 5: Aphorismen, ed. Reinhardt Habel, 1987.
- Volume 6: Kritische Schriften, ed. Helmut Gumtau, 1987.
- Volume 7: Briefwechsel 1878–1903, ed. Katharina Breitner, 2005.
- Volume 8: Briefwechsel 1905–1908, ed. Katharina Breitner, 2011.
- Volume 9: Briefwechsel 1909–1914, ed. Agnes Harder, 2018.

== See also ==
- Four Orchestral Songs (Krása)

== Literature ==
- Michael Bauer: . Piper, München 1933 (completed by Margareta Morgenstern and Rudolf Meyer. With contributions by Friedrich Kayssler and others). (Reprint 1985, Urachhaus, Stuttgart).
- Martin Beheim-Schwarzbach: . Rowohlt, Reinbek 1964, ISBN 3-499-50097-3 (Rowohlts Monographien, Band 97)
- Maurice Cureau: . Peter Lang, Bern 1986.
- Herbert Gumtau: . Colloquium, Berlin 1971.
- Reinhardt Habel: Morgenstern, Christian. In: Neue Deutsche Biographie (NDB). Band 18, Duncker & Humblot, Berlin 1997, ISBN 3-428-00199-0, S. 104–108 (Digitalisat).
- Reinhardt Habel: "Christian Morgenstern and Rudolf Steiner"
- Ueli Haldimann (Hrsg.): Hermann Hesse, Thomas Mann und andere in Arosa – Texte und Bilder aus zwei Jahrhunderten, AS Verlag und Buchkonzept AG, Zürich 2001, pp. 65–71, ISBN 3-905111-67-5
- Heiko Postma: ...um des Reimes willen" Über den Poeten Christian Morgenstern (1871 - 1914), jmb Verlag, Hannover 2015, ISBN 978-3-944342-61-0.
- Anthony T. Wilson: Über die Galgenlieder Christian Morgensterns. Königshausen und Neumann (= Epistemata – Würzburger wissenschaftliche Schriften. Reihe Literaturwissenschaft, Bd. 448), 2003, ISBN 978-3-8260-2490-0.
