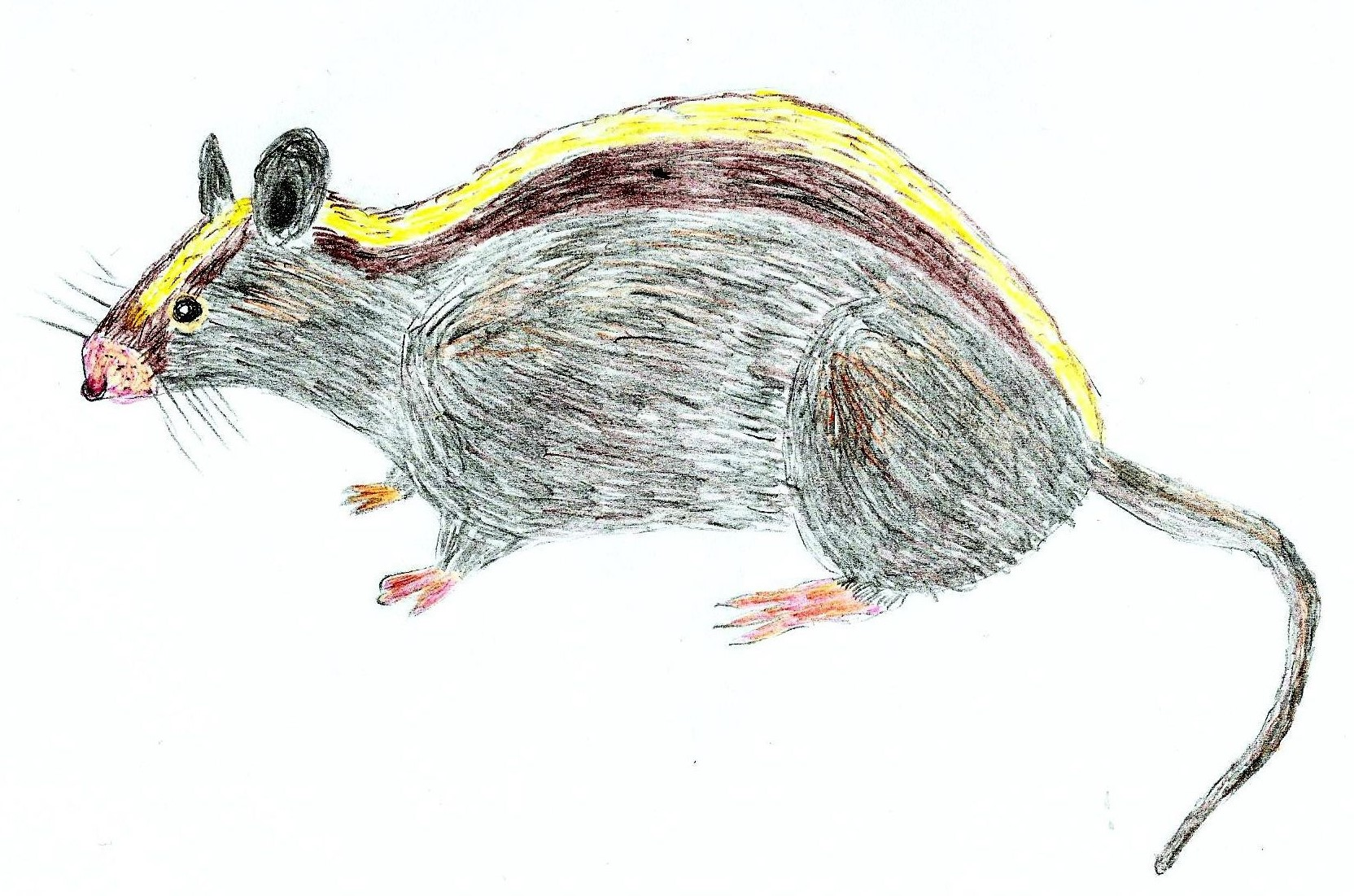

Conservation status
- Least Concern (IUCN 3.1)

Scientific classification
- Kingdom: Animalia
- Phylum: Chordata
- Class: Mammalia
- Order: Rodentia
- Family: Muridae
- Genus: Chrotomys
- Species: C. mindorensis

Binomial name
- Chrotomys mindorensis Kellogg, 1945
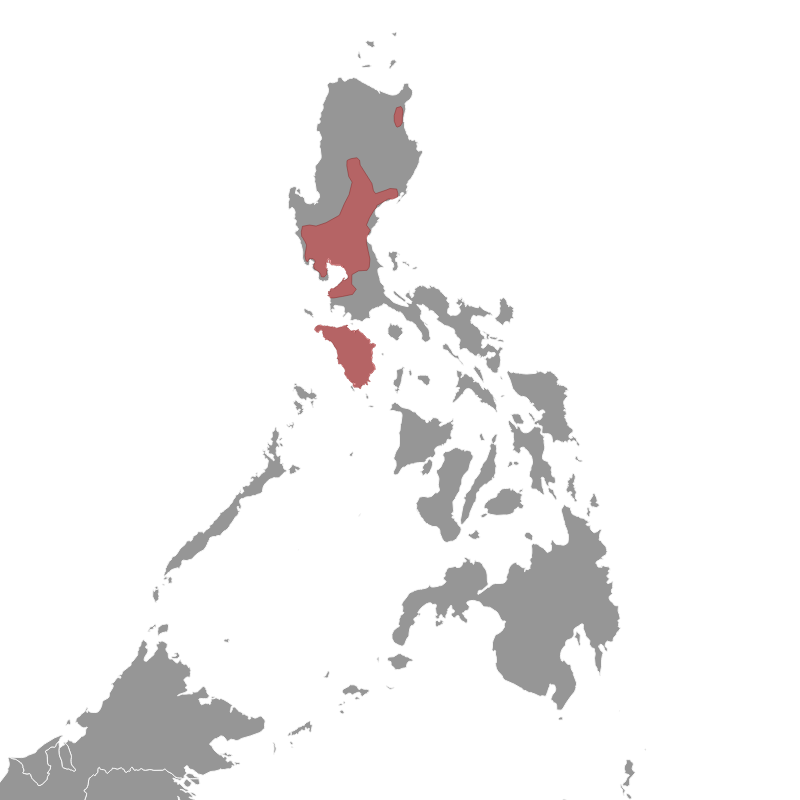

= Mindoro striped rat =

Mindoro Striped Rat

Species of rodent

The Mindoro striped rat (Chrotomys mindorensis) is a species of rodent in the family Muridae. It is found only in the Philippines.

== Taxonomy ==
Chrotomys mindorensis was first described as a subspecies of C. whiteheadi by Remington Kellogg in 1945, and later elevated to a full species by Guy Musser, Linda Gordon, and Helmut Sommer in 1982. The type locality is "3 miles south-southeast of San Jose (Central)", on Mindoro island.

It was originally distinguished from C. whiteheadi by features of its teeth and cranium. The difference in color between the two species was initially thought to be an artifact of the age of the old museum specimens of C. whiteheadi, which had been stored since 1895, but later analysis proved that C. whiteheadi in fact had darker fur even in recently collected specimens.

== Description ==
The Mindoro stripped rat has thinner fur compared to C. whiteheadi. Many individuals have black or dark brown stripes along the back, with a yellow stripe in the center along the spine; the color of this stripe varies significantly within the species. The rest of the body is "pale yellowish buff, suffused with gray on the sides of the head and body", unlike the dark brown fur of C. whiteheadi. It is also distinguished from C. whiteheadi by its notably larger molars.

The Mindoro stripped rat is larger than the other species in Chrotomys. The length of the head and body ranges from 155 millimetres (6.1 in) to 186 millimetres (7.3 in), with a tail from 99 millimetres (3.9 in) to 123 millimetres (4.8 in).

== Distribution, ecology, and conservation status ==
The Mindoro stripped rat occurs on the islands of Mindoro and Luzon in the Philippines. It has been found at elevations between 30 metres (98 ft) to 2,025 metres (6,644 ft). It lives in forest and nearby farmlands. The diet includes earthworms.

It is concerned a species of Least Concern by the IUCN due to its large range and likely high population, as well as tolerance for human disruption of its habitat.
