= Rhinogradentia =

Fictitious order of mammals

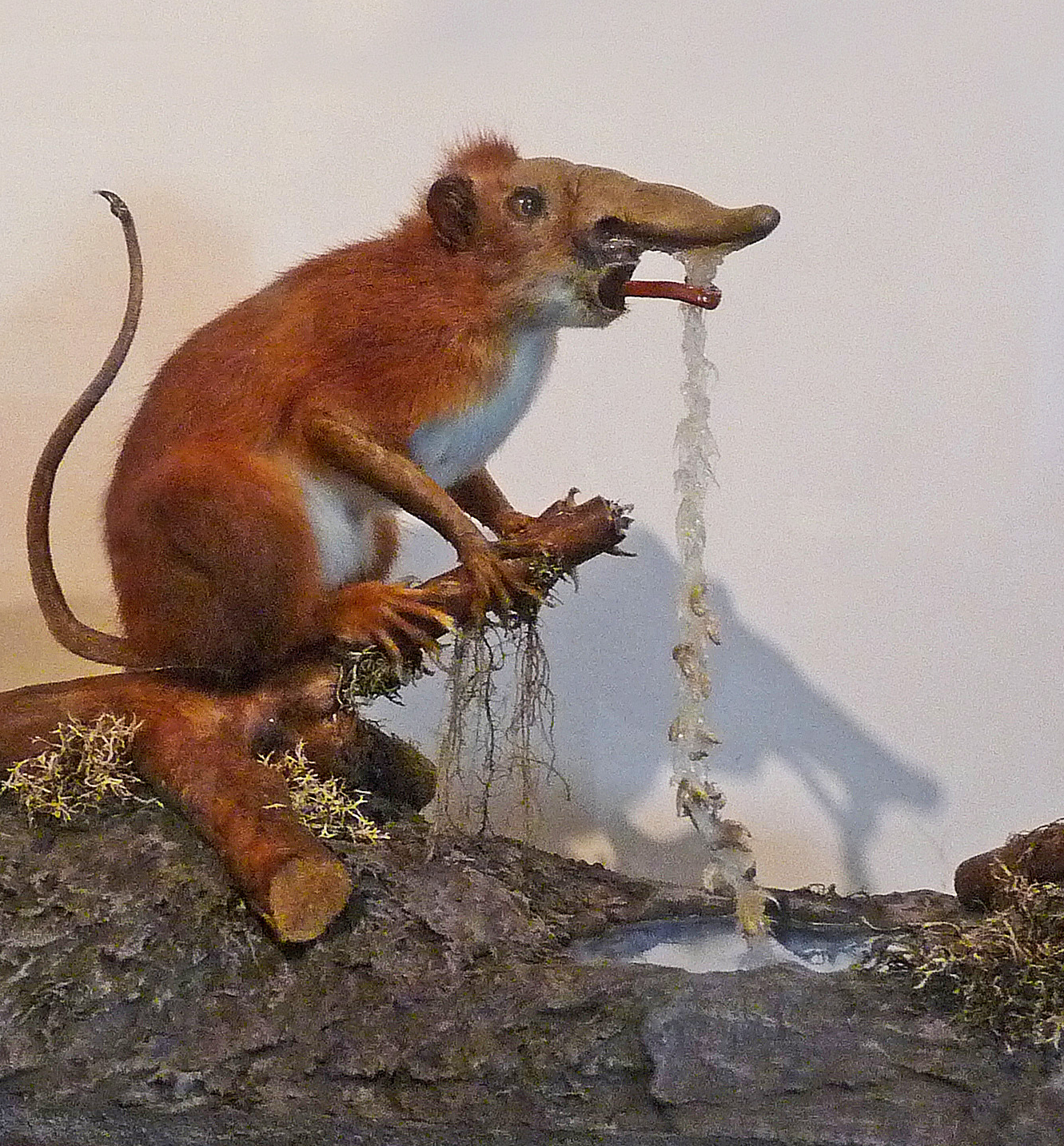
A mock taxidermy of a rhinograde, using its "nasorium" to fish, at the Musée zoologique de la ville de Strasbourg.

Rhinogradentia is a fictitious order of extinct shrew-like mammals invented by German zoologist Gerolf Steiner. Members of the order, known as rhinogrades or snouters, are characterized by a nose-like feature called a "nasorium", which evolved to fulfill a wide variety of functions in different species. Steiner also created a fictional persona, naturalist Harald Stümpke, who is credited as author of the 1961 book Bau und Leben der Rhinogradentia (translated into English in 1967 as The Snouters: Form and Life of the Rhinogrades). According to Steiner, it is the only remaining record of the animals, which were wiped out, along with all the world's Rhinogradentia researchers, when the small Pacific archipelago they inhabited sank into the ocean due to nearby atomic bomb testing.

Mimicking a genuine scientific work, Rhinogradentia has appeared in several publications without any note of its fictitious nature, sometimes in connection with April Fools' Day.

== Background ==
Rhinogradentia, their island home of Hy-yi-yi, zoologist Harald Stümpke, and a host of other people, places, and documents are fictional creations of Gerolf Steiner (1908–2009), a German zoologist. Steiner is best known for his fictional work as Stümpke, but he was an accomplished zoologist in his own right. He held a professorship at the University of Heidelberg and later the Technical University of Karlsruhe, where he occupied the department chair from 1962 to 1973.

Steiner was also interested in illustration, and in 1945 drew a picture for one of his students as thanks for some food. He took inspiration from a short nonsense poem by Christian Morgenstern, The Nasobame (Das Nasobēm) about an animal that walked using its nose. He took to the drawing, made a copy for himself, and later incorporated the creatures into his teaching. According to Bud Webster, Steiner's motivation for writing a book about them was instructional, to illustrate "how animals evolve in isolation", but Joe Cain speculates that the success of the joke may have led to a teaching and writing career based on that rather than the other way around.

== Harald Stümpke's account ==
Steiner's fictional author, credited as "quondam curator of the Museum of the Darwin Institute of Hy-yi-yi, Mairuwili", provides a very detailed account of the order and individual species, written in a dry, scholarly tone. Michael Ohl wrote that the book is written "in truly amusing attention to detail and using what is immediately recognizable as a practiced scientific patois". The evidently expert voice of the author, his competent writing, and apparent familiarity with conventions of academic literature set the work apart as a rare example at the intersection of fiction and scholarship. Steiner credits himself by name as illustrator of the book, and explains how that role led him to possess the only remaining record of Rhinogradentia.

=== Discovery and study at Hy-yi-yi ===
According to Stümpke, Rhinogradentia were native to Hy-yi-yi, a small Pacific archipelago comprising eighteen islands: Annoorussawubbissy, Awkoavussa, Hiddudify, Koavussa, Lowlukha, Lownunnoia, Mara, Miroovilly, Mittuddinna, Naty, Nawissy, Noorubbissy, Osovitissy, Ownavussa, Owsuddowsa, Shanelukha, Towteng-Awko, and Vinsy. The islands occupied 1,690 km^{2} (650 sq mi) and the archipelago's highest peak, 2,230 m (7,320 ft), was on its main island, Hiddudify (Hy-dud-dye-fee).

The first description of Hy-yi-yi published in Europe was that of Einar Pettersson-Skämtkvist, a Swedish explorer who arrived in Hiddudify by chance in 1941, after escaping from a Japanese prisoner-of-war camp. Each of the islands was home to distinctive fauna, dominated by Rhinogradentia, the only mammals other than humans and one species of shrew. In the time after the war, a number of scientists took interest in the rhinogrades and began formal research into their physiology, morphology, behaviors, and evolution.

In the late 1950s, nearby nuclear weapons testing by the United States military accidentally caused all of the islands of Hy-yi-yi to sink into the ocean, destroying all traces of the rhinogrades and their unique ecosystem. Also killed were all the world's Rhinogradentia researchers, who were attending a conference on Hy-yi-yi at the time. The book's epilogue, credited to Steiner in his capacity as the book's illustrator, explains that Stümpke had sent the book's materials to Steiner to serve as the basis for illustrations in preparation for publication. Following the disaster, it is the only remaining record of the subjects it describes.

=== Biological characteristics and behavior ===
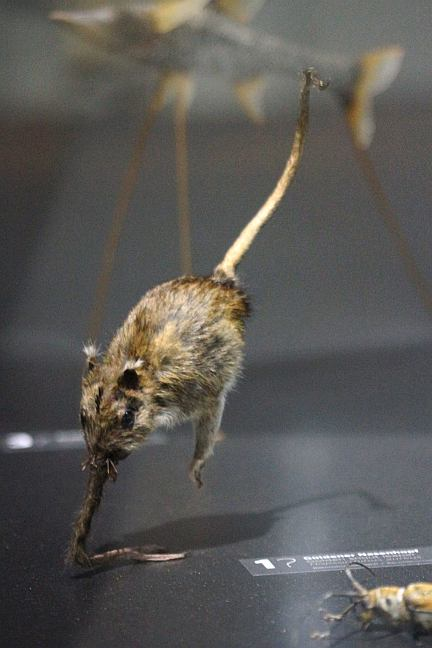
Hopsorrhinus aureus at Museum Wiesbaden

Rhinogrades are mammals characterized by a nose-like feature called a "nasorium", the form and function of which vary significantly between species. According to Stümpke, the order's remarkable variety was the natural outcome of evolution acting over millions of years in the remote Hy-yi-yi islands. All the 14 families and 189 known snouter species descended from a small shrew-like animal, which gradually evolved and diversified to fill most of the ecological niches in the archipelago — from tiny worm-like beings to large herbivores and predators.

Many rhinogrades used their nose for locomotion, for example the "snout leapers" like Hopsorrhinus aureus, whose nasorium was used for jumping, or the "earwings" like Otopteryx, which flew backwards by flapping its ears and used its nose as a rudder. Some species used their nasorium for catching food, for example by using it to fish or to attract and trap insects. Other species included the fierce Tyrannonasus imperator and the shaggy Mammontops.

Pettersson-Skämtkvist's early descriptions of the animals he encountered on Hy-yi-yi led zoologists to name them after the title creature in Christian Morgenstern's The Nasobame. In the poem, which exists outside of this fictional universe and also served as an inspiration for Steiner, the Nasobame is seen "striding on its noses" (auf seinen Nasen schreitet).

=== Genera ===
Stümpke's book classifies 138 species of rhinograde in the following fictitious genera:

- Archirrhinos
- Cephalanthus
- Columnifax
- Corbulonasus
- Dulcicauda
- Eledonopsis
- Emunctator
- Enterorrhinus
- Hexanthus
- Holorrhinus
- Hopsorrhinus
- Larvanasus
- Liliopsis
- Mammontops
- Mercatorrhinus
- Nasobema
- Nasolimaceus
- Nudirhinus
- Orchidiopsis
- Otopteryx
- Phyllohopla
- Ranunculonasus
- Remanonasus
- Rhinochilopus
- Rhinolimacius
- Rhinosiphonia
- Rhinostentor
- Rhinotaenia
- Rhinotalpa
- Rhizoidonasus
- Stella
- Tyrannonasus

The names generally refer to particular forms or functions of the nasorium of animals in that genus, typically providing vernacular names for clarity. Three of the names, by coincidence, correspond to actual scientific names of plants: Cephalanthus, Hexanthus, and Stella.

== Publication history ==
Steiner's books as Stümpke have been translated into other languages, sometimes crediting other names based on the country of publication. "Harald Stümpke", "Massimo Pandolfi", "Hararuto Shutyunpuke", and "Karl D. S. Geeste" are pseudonyms. Translator names are real.

- Stümpke, Harald (1957). Bau und Leben der Rhinogradentia. Stuttgart: Gustav Fischer Verlag. ISBN 3-437-30083-0. OCLC 65616734.
  - Stümpke, Harald (1962). Anatomie et Biologie des Rhinogrades — Un Nouvel Ordre de Mammifères (Trans. Robert Weill). Paris: Masson. ISBN 978-2-10-005449-7. OCLC 46829688.
  - Stümpke, Harald (1967). The Snouters: Form and Life of the Rhinogrades (Trans. Leigh Chadwick). Garden City, NY: The Natural History Press. OCLC 436148.
  - Pandolfi, Massimo (1992). I Rinogradi di Harald Stümpke e la zoologia fantastica (Trans. Achaz von Hardenberg). Padua: Franco Muzzio. ISBN 88-7021-485-0. OCLC 875787215.
  - Shutyunpuke, Hararuto (1997). Bikōri: atarashiku-hakken-sareta-honyūrui-no-kōzō-to-seikatsu. Tokyo: Hakuhinsha. ISBN 4-938706-19-9. OCLC 76500640.
- Geeste, Karl D. S. (1988). Stümpke's Rhinogradentia: Versuch einer Analyse. Stuttgart: Gustav Fischer Verlag. ISBN 3-437-30597-2. OCLC 28345723.

== Legacy ==
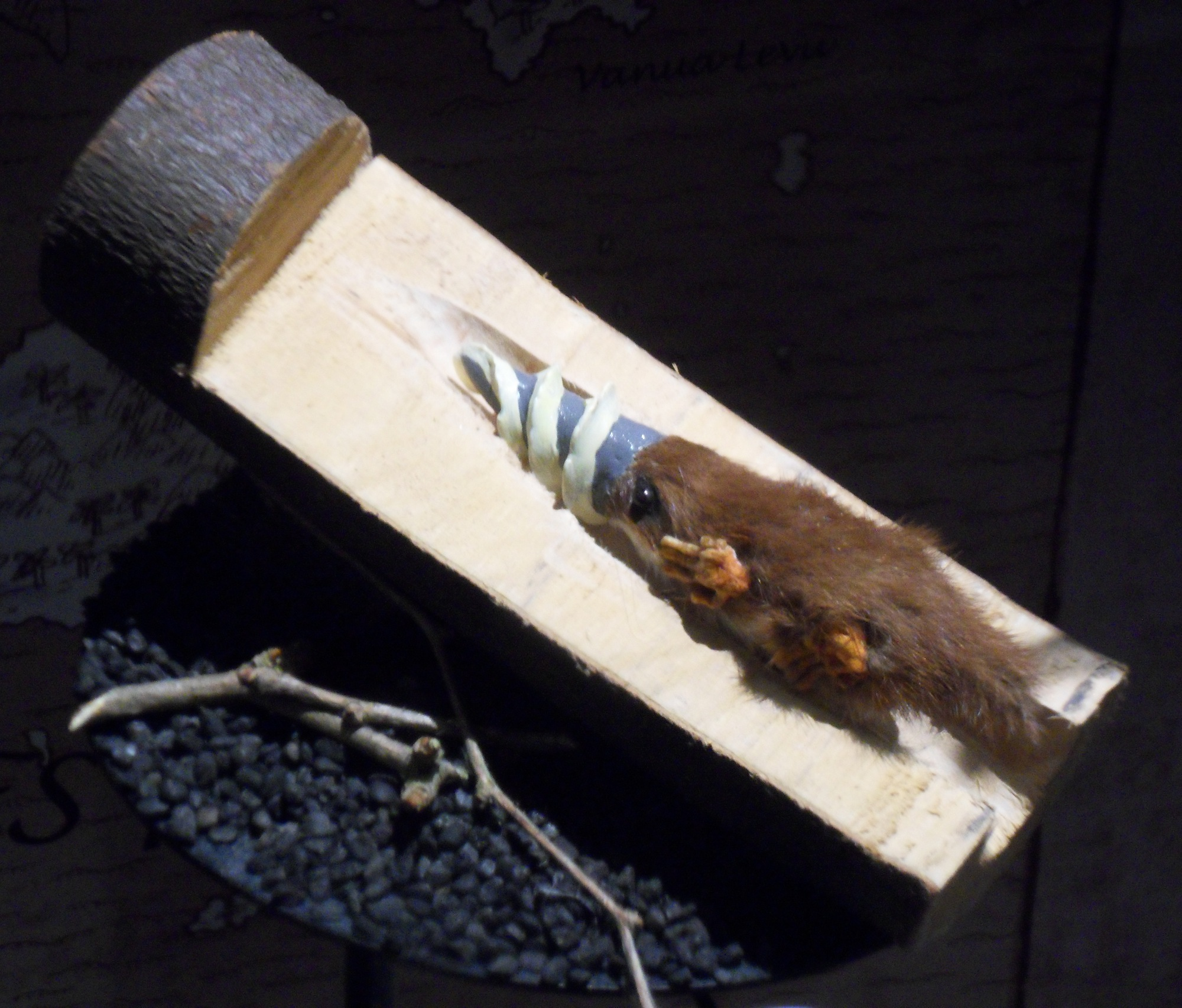
Nasoperforator, a genus "discovered" on April Fools' Day in 2012 by the National Museum of Natural History in France.

Rhinogradentia is considered one of the best known biological hoaxes and scientific jokes and Steiner's pseudonymous works on the subject continue to be reprinted and translated. The first edition did not explicitly state that it was a hoax.

Following the publication of the French translation, George Gaylord Simpson wrote a seemingly serious review which extended the hoax in a 1963 issue of the journal Science, taking issue with the way Stümpke named the animals as "criminal violations of the International Code of Zoological Nomenclature". Simpson also noted that Stümpke neglected to include an unrelated mathematical concept, a "rotated matrix".

Since the book's original publication several scientists and publishers have written about Rhinogradentia as though Steiner's account were true, though it is unclear how many of those who continued and popularized the joke did so intentionally. Wulf Ankle wrote that the order "is not a poetic invention, but has really lived". Rolf Siewing's Zoology Primer lists them as an order of mammal, noting that their existence is doubted. Erich von Holst celebrated the discovery of "a completely new animal world". Timothy E. Lawlor's widely read textbook Handbook to the Orders and Families of Living Mammals includes an entry for Rhinogradentia that does not acknowledge its fictional nature. The East German Liberal-Demokratische Zeitung took note of the nuclear demise of the rhinogrades, writing that they would still be alive "had we, the peaceable powers, managed in time to implement widespread disarmament and prohibit the production and testing of nuclear weapons."

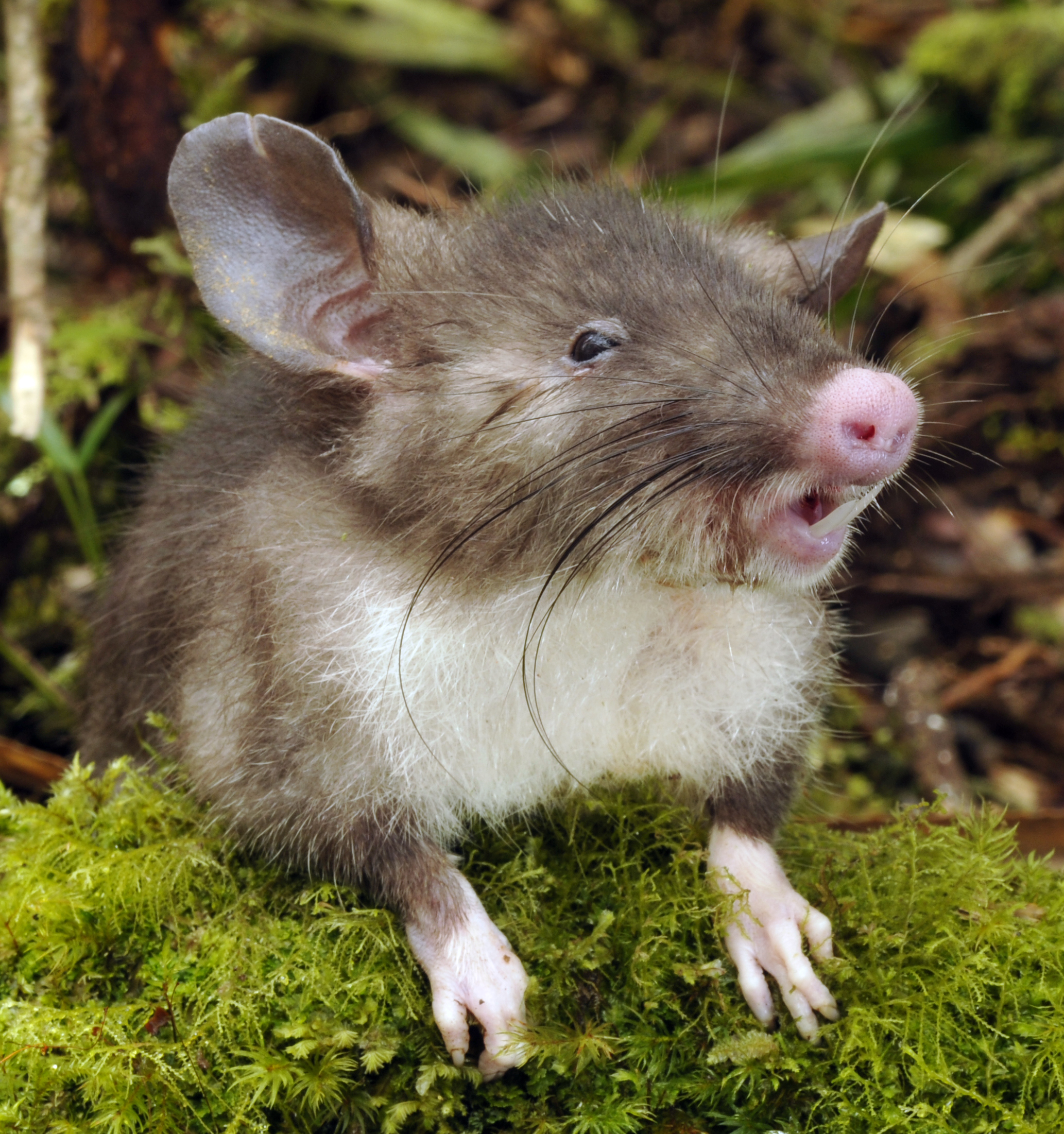
Hyorhinomys stuempkei, a real species of shrew rat named for Stümpke

Prior to the publication of Leigh Chadwick's English translation, an abbreviated version ran in the April 1967 edition of Natural History, a magazine published by the American Museum of Natural History. It comprised material from the book's introduction, first chapter, selected descriptions of genera, and the epilogue, and was presented as the lead story, without qualification, by the normally serious publication. The following month, The New York Times ran a story about the snouters on the front page, based on the Natural History article. According to the magazine's editorial director, they had "received more than 100 letters and telegraphs about the snouters, most of them from people who forgot that the article was published on April Fool's Day." Natural History printed several letters to the editor in its June–July issue, and conveyed to the Times the content of several more, ranging from skeptical to fascinated and continuations of the joke. One reader, entomologist Alice Gray, expressed thanks for the article, which enabled her family to identify an animal-shaped metal bracelet from the South Pacific as having been modeled after a "Hoop Snouter", and included a drawing to preserve the record because, she said, it had been melted down with some toy soldiers and a spoon by a young cousin with a new casting set.

Decades later, papers are still published purporting to continue Stümpke's research or otherwise paying homage to Steiner's hoax. In a 2004 paper in the Russian Journal of Marine Biology, authors Kashkina & Bukashkina claim to have discovered two new marine genera: Dendronasus and an as yet unnamed parasitic taxon. The Max Planck Institute for Limnology announced a new species discovered in the Großer Plöner See. On April Fools' Day in 2012, the National Museum of Natural History in France announced the discovery of a wood-eating termite-like genus, Nasoperferator, with a rotating nose resembling a drill.

Rhinogradentia has been included in a number of museum exhibitions and collections. The National Museum of Natural History's Nasoperferator announcement was accompanied by a two-month exhibit honoring the animals, featuring purported stuffed specimens in its gallery of extinct species. Mock taxidermies of rhinogrades have also been included in an exhibit at the Musée d'ethnographie de Neuchâtel, and in the permanent collections of the Musée zoologique de la ville de Strasbourg and the Salzburg Haus der Natur.

Three real species have been named after Steiner and Stümpke: Rhinogradentia steineri, a snout moth, Hyorhinomys stuempkei, a shrew rat also known as the Sulawesi snouter, and Tateomys rhinogradoides, the Tate's shrew rat.

== See also ==
- Caminalcules, another fictional group of animals introduced as a tool for understanding phylogenetics
- Codex Seraphinianus
- Eoörnis pterovelox gobiensis – an older biological hoax, a fictional bird
- Fictitious entry
- Lists of fictional species
- Pacific Northwest tree octopus
