= Co's shrew mouse =

Conservation status
- Data Deficient (IUCN 3.1)

Scientific classification
- Kingdom: Animalia
- Phylum: Chordata
- Class: Mammalia
- Order: Rodentia
- Family: Muridae
- Genus: Soricomys
- Species: S. leonardocoi

Binomial name
- Soricomys leonardocoi Balete, Rickart, Heaney, Alviola, M. R. M. Duya, M. V. Duya, Sosa & Jansa, 2012

Species of rodent

Co's shrew mouse (Soricomys leonardocoi) is a rodent of the genus Soricomys found on the island of Luzon, in the northern Philippines.
