= The Nasobame =

Das Nasobēm, usually translated into English as The Nasobame, is a short nonsense poem by German writer Christian Morgenstern (1871–1914). It was written around 1895 and published in his book Galgenlieder (1905).

Auf seinen Nasen schreitet
einher das Nasobēm,
von seinem Kind begleitet.
Es steht noch nicht im Brehm.
Es steht noch nicht im Meyer.
Und auch im Brockhaus nicht.
Es trat aus meiner Leyer
zum ersten Mal ans Licht.
Auf seinen Nasen schreitet
(wie schon gesagt) seitdem,
von seinem Kind begleitet,
einher das Nasobēm.

Striding on its noses
there comes the Nasobame,
with its young in tow.
It isn't yet in Brehm's
It isn't yet in Meyer's
And neither in Brockhaus'
It trotted out of my lyre
when it came first to light.
Striding on its noses
thereon (as I've said above),
with its young in tow,
there goes the nasobame.

This poem is notable for, among other things, having inspired zoologist Gerolf Steiner to write in 1961 an extremely popular mock-scientific treatise on the fictitious animal order of the Rhinogradentia, also called "nasobames" or "snouters", whose nasal appendages had evolved in many amazing ways. Poetic translations of this poem (by Robert Weill - French, G.G. Simpson - English and L. Chadwick - English) can be found in his 1988 sequel .
