= Tapulao shrew-rat =

Conservation status
- Data Deficient (IUCN 3.1)

Scientific classification
- Kingdom: Animalia
- Phylum: Chordata
- Class: Mammalia
- Order: Rodentia
- Family: Muridae
- Genus: Rhynchomys
- Species: R. tapulao

Binomial name
- Rhynchomys tapulao Balete, Rickart, Rosell-Ambal, Jansa & Heaney, 2007
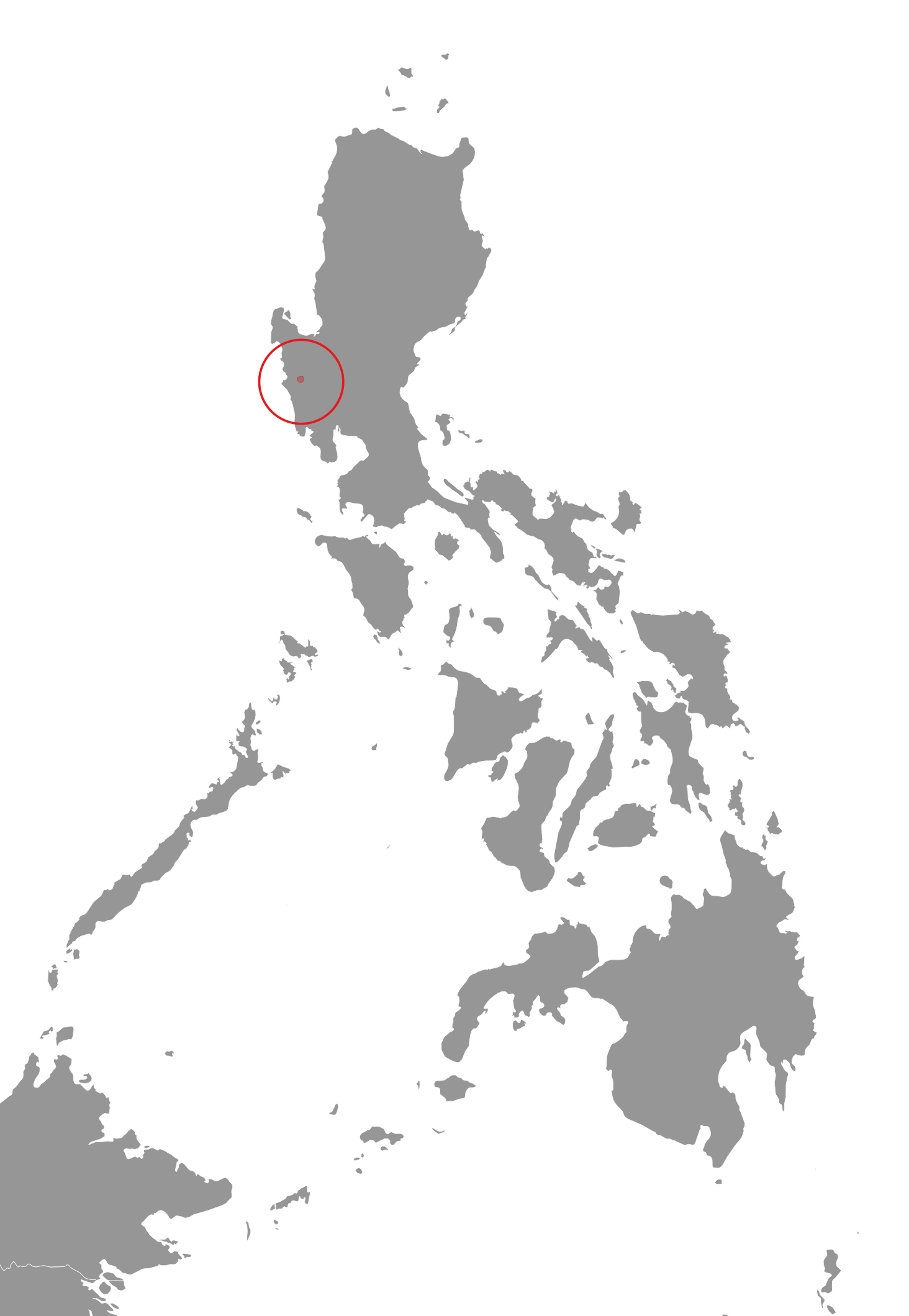

Species of rodent

The Tapulao shrew-rat (Rhynchomys tapulao) is a rodent in the subfamily Murinae. It was described in 2007.
