= Labo shrew rat =

Scientific classification
- Kingdom: Animalia
- Phylum: Chordata
- Class: Mammalia
- Order: Rodentia
- Family: Muridae
- Genus: Rhynchomys
- Species: R. labo

Binomial name
- Rhynchomys labo Rickart, Balete, Timm, Alviola, Esselstyn, & Heaney, 2019

Species of rodent

The Labo shrew rat (Rhynchomys labo) is a species of shrewlike rat in the subfamily Murinae. It was discovered at elevations above 1250 m on Mt. Labo of the Bicol Peninsula of Luzon in the Philippines and described in 2019.
