= Mingan shrew rat =

Scientific classification
- Kingdom: Animalia
- Phylum: Chordata
- Class: Mammalia
- Order: Rodentia
- Family: Muridae
- Genus: Rhynchomys
- Species: R. mingan

Binomial name
- Rhynchomys mingan Rickart, Balete, Timm, Alviola, Esselstyn, & Heaney, 2019

Species of rodent

The Mingan shrew rat (Rhynchomys mingan) is a species of shrewlike rat in the subfamily Murinae. It was discovered at elevations above 1450 m on Mt. Mingan of the central Sierra Madre of Luzon in the Philippines and described in 2019.
