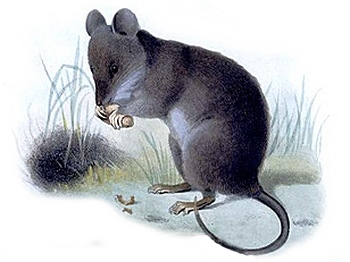

Conservation status
- Least Concern (IUCN 3.1)

Scientific classification
- Kingdom: Animalia
- Phylum: Chordata
- Class: Mammalia
- Order: Rodentia
- Family: Muridae
- Genus: Chrotomys
- Species: C. silaceus

Binomial name
- Chrotomys silaceus (Thomas, 1895)
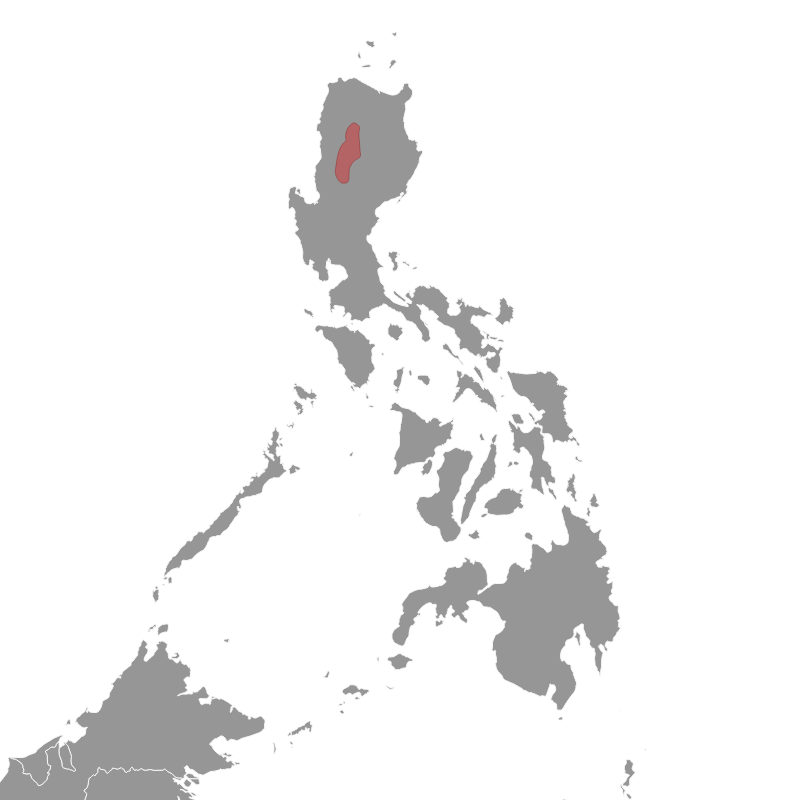

Synonyms
- Calaenomys silaceus (Thomas, 1895)

= Blazed Luzon shrew-rat =

Blazed Luzon shrew rat

Species of rodent

The blazed Luzon shrew rat (Chrotomys silaceus) is a species of rodent in the family Muridae, endemic to the Philippines.

== Distribution and habitat ==
The species occurs in the Central Cordillera in northern Luzon at elevations of 1,800 - 2,500 m, where it is known only from four disparate localities. It frequents dense vegetation in montane and mossy forests and does not make use of severely disturbed habitat, although it has been reported from mosaic vegetation created by landslides.
