= Mount Isarog shrew-mouse =

Conservation status
- Vulnerable (IUCN 3.1)

Scientific classification
- Kingdom: Animalia
- Phylum: Chordata
- Class: Mammalia
- Order: Rodentia
- Family: Muridae
- Genus: Archboldomys
- Species: A. luzonensis

Binomial name
- Archboldomys luzonensis Musser, 1982
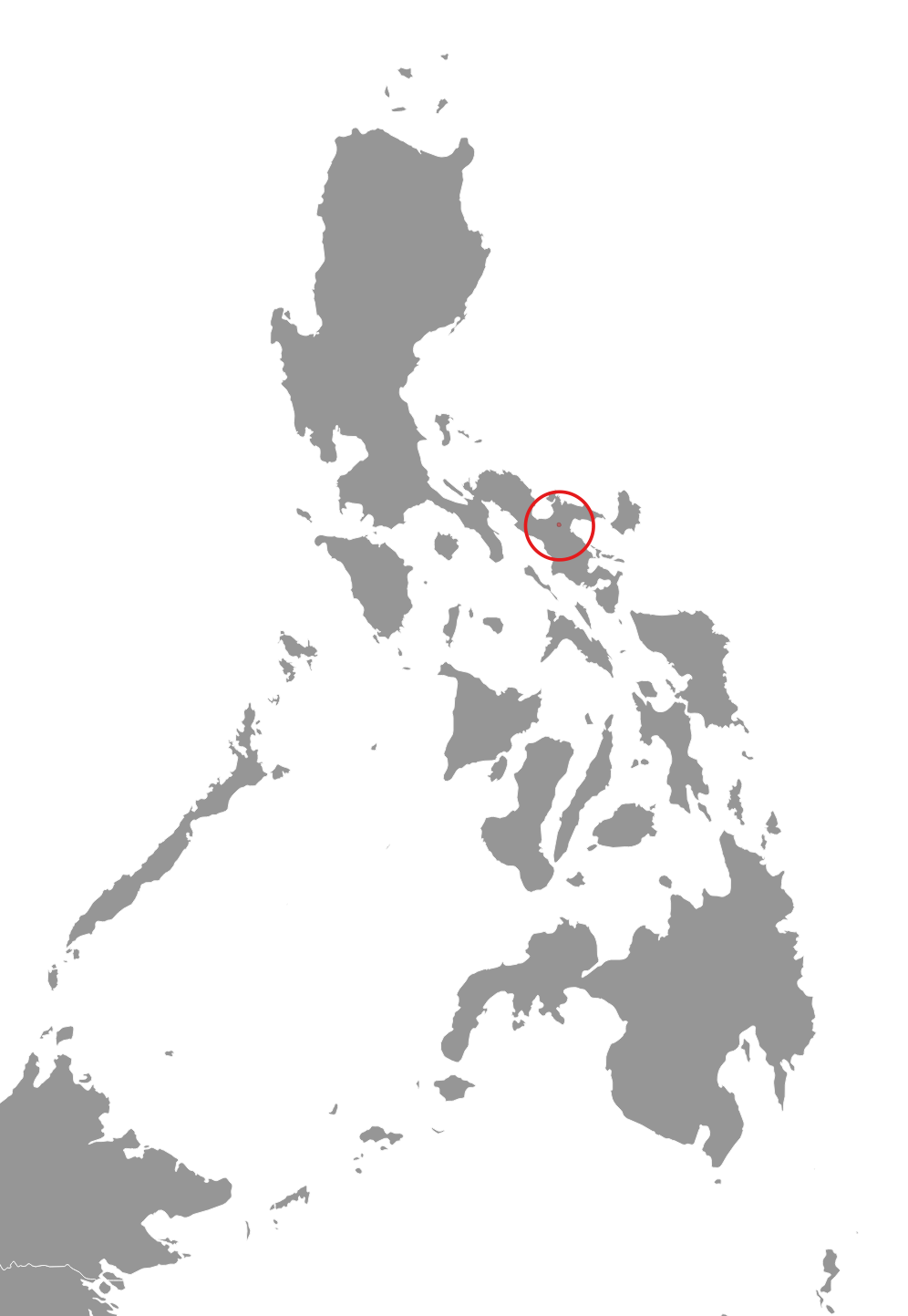

Species of rodent

The Mount Isarog shrew-mouse (Archboldomys luzonensis) is a species of rodent in the family Muridae found only in the Philippines. Its natural habitats include subtropical or tropical dry forest. It is threatened by habitat loss due to logging operations.
