= Banahao shrew-rat =

Conservation status
- Least Concern (IUCN 3.1)

Scientific classification
- Kingdom: Animalia
- Phylum: Chordata
- Class: Mammalia
- Order: Rodentia
- Family: Muridae
- Genus: Rhynchomys
- Species: R. banahao

Binomial name
- Rhynchomys banahao Balete, Rickart, Rosell-Ambal, Jansa & Heaney, 2007
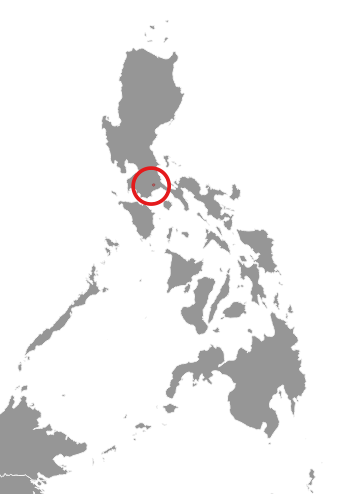

Species of rodent

The Banahao shrew-rat (Rhynchomys banahao) is a species of rodent in the genus Rhynchomys. It was described in 2007.
