= Sibuyan striped shrew-rat =

Conservation status
- Data Deficient (IUCN 3.1)

Scientific classification
- Kingdom: Animalia
- Phylum: Chordata
- Class: Mammalia
- Order: Rodentia
- Family: Muridae
- Genus: Chrotomys
- Species: C. sibuyanensis

Binomial name
- Chrotomys sibuyanensis Rickart, Heaney, Goodman & Jansa, 2005
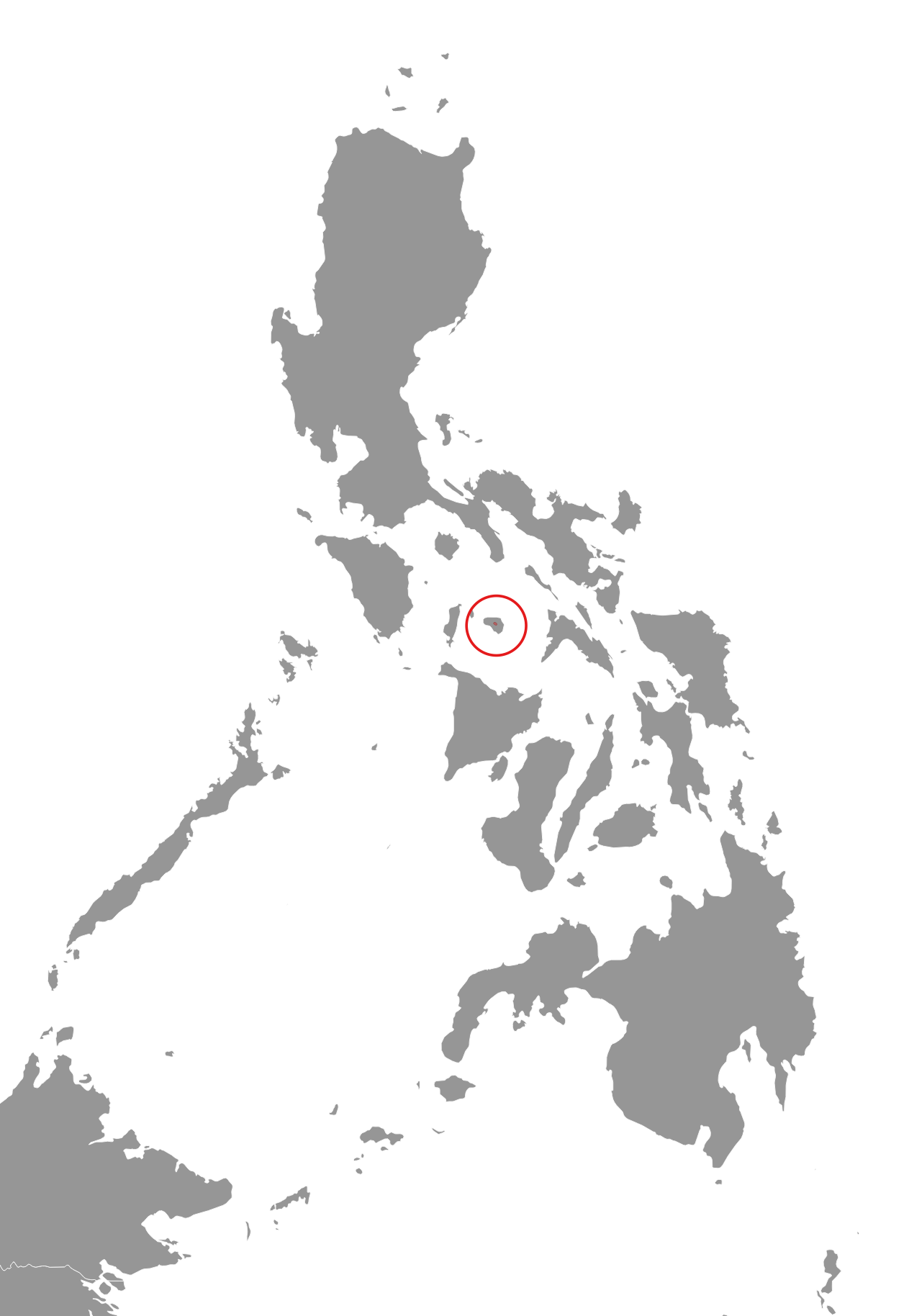

Species of rodent

Sibuyan striped shrew-rat (Chrotomys sibuyanensis) is a species of rodent in the family Muridae. The holotype was collected in 1992; however, it wasn't formally described until 2005.
