= Isarog shrew-rat =

Conservation status
- Vulnerable (IUCN 3.1)

Scientific classification
- Kingdom: Animalia
- Phylum: Chordata
- Class: Mammalia
- Order: Rodentia
- Family: Muridae
- Genus: Rhynchomys
- Species: R. isarogensis

Binomial name
- Rhynchomys isarogensis Musser & Freeman, 1981
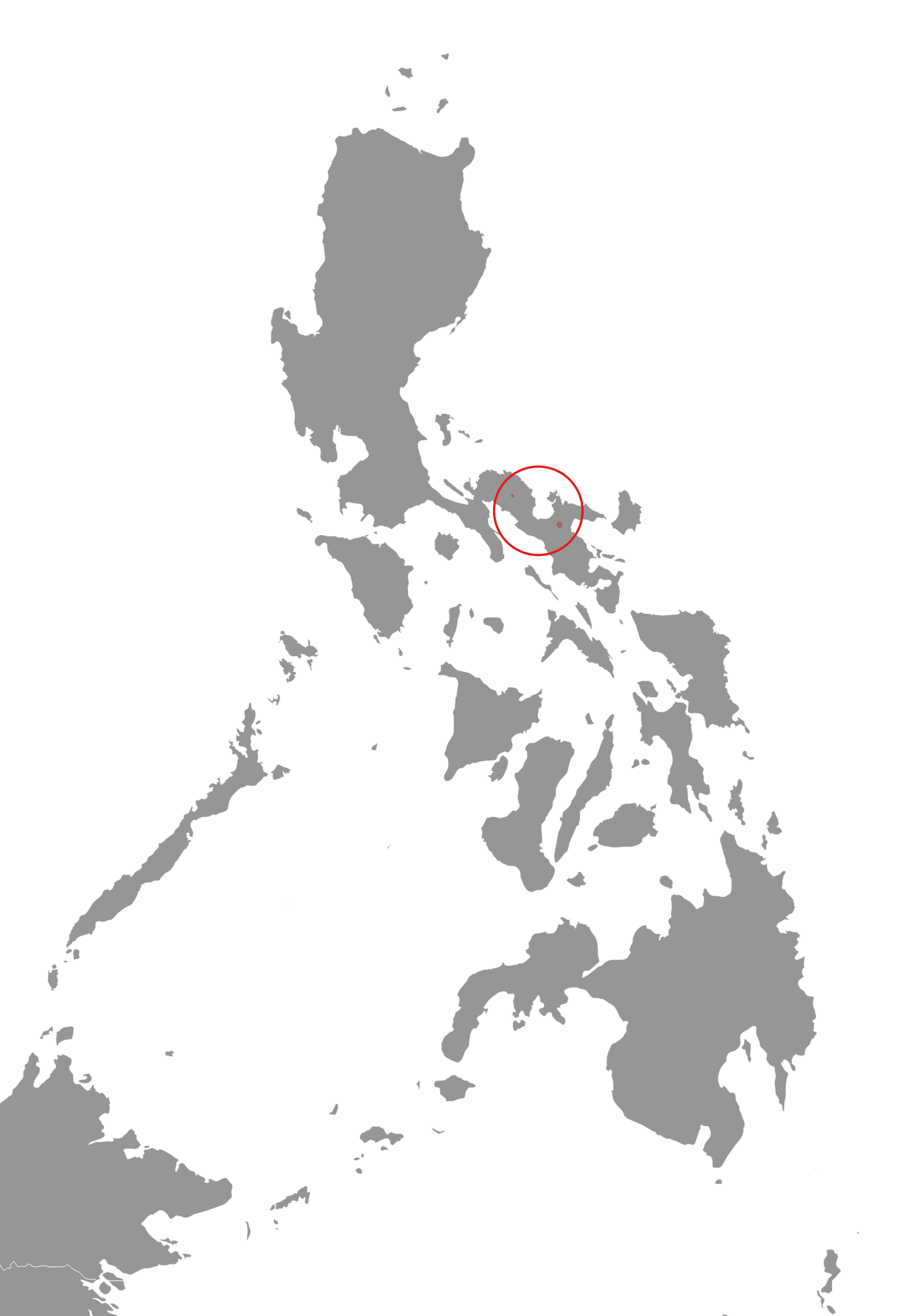

Species of rodent

The Isarog shrew-rat or Mount Isarog shrew-rat (Rhynchomys isarogensis) is a species of rodent in the family Muridae. It is found only in the Philippines.
