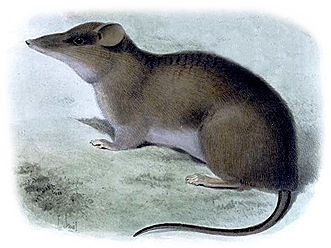
- An illustration of the Mt. Data shrew-rat

Conservation status
- Near Threatened (IUCN 3.1)

Scientific classification
- Kingdom: Animalia
- Phylum: Chordata
- Class: Mammalia
- Order: Rodentia
- Family: Muridae
- Genus: Rhynchomys
- Species: R. soricoides

Binomial name
- Rhynchomys soricoides Thomas, 1895
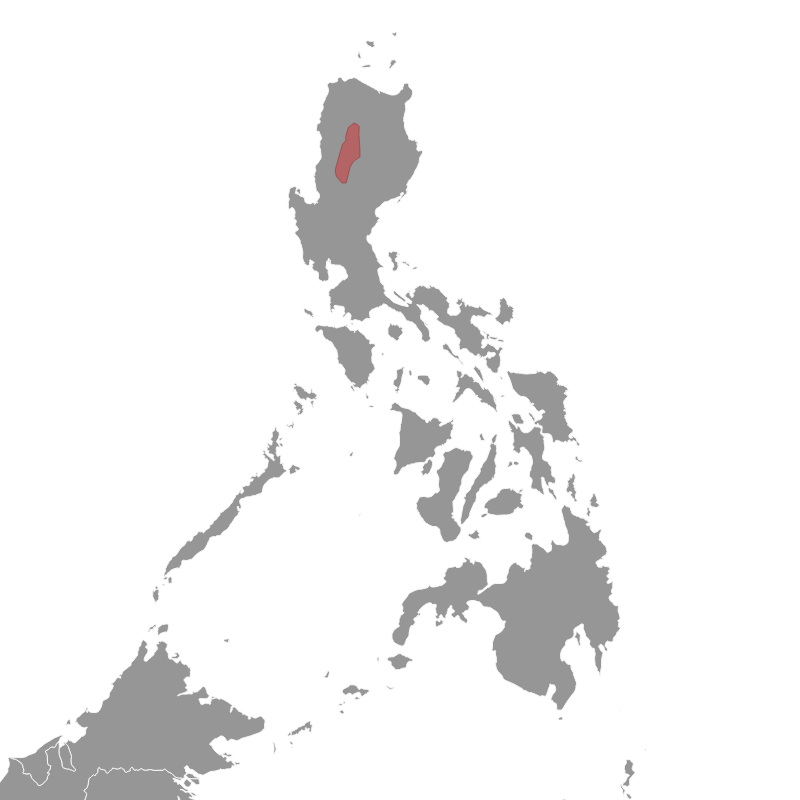

= Mount Data shrew-rat =

Species of rodent

The Mount Data shrew-rat (Rhynchomys soricoides) is a species of rodent in the family Muridae. It is found only in the Philippines.
