= Sierra Madre shrew mouse =

Scientific classification
- Kingdom: Animalia
- Phylum: Chordata
- Class: Mammalia
- Order: Rodentia
- Family: Muridae
- Genus: Soricomys
- Species: S. musseri

Binomial name
- Soricomys musseri (Rickart, Heaney, Tabaranza Jr. and Balete, 1998)
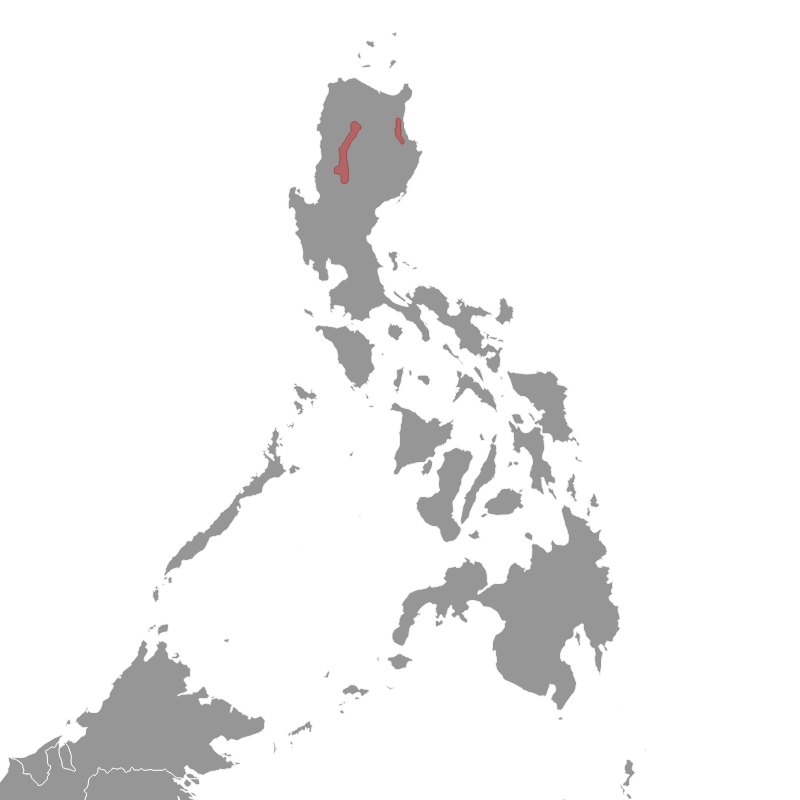

Synonyms
- Archboldomys musseri

Species of rodent

The Sierra Madre shrew mouse (Soricomys musseri) is a species of mammal from the Philippines.
