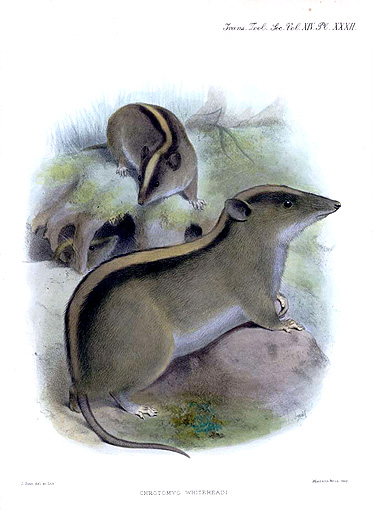

Conservation status
- Least Concern (IUCN 3.1)

Scientific classification
- Kingdom: Animalia
- Phylum: Chordata
- Class: Mammalia
- Order: Rodentia
- Family: Muridae
- Genus: Chrotomys
- Species: C. whiteheadi

Binomial name
- Chrotomys whiteheadi Thomas, 1895
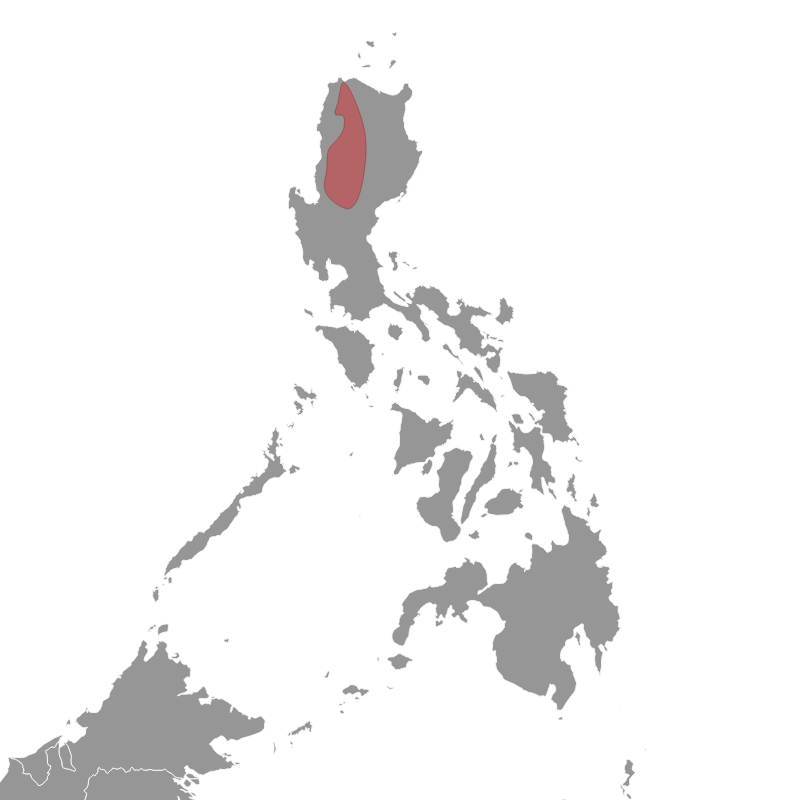

= Luzon striped rat =

Species of rodent

The Luzon striped rat (Chrotomys whiteheadi) is a species of rodent in the family Muridae. It is found only in the Philippines.

== Taxonomy ==
Both the genus and species Chrotomys whiteheadi were first named by Oldfield Thomas in 1895, and formally described in 1898, based on a specimen collected by John Whitehead, after whom the species was named. The type locality was Mount Data.

== Description ==
Size of Mus rattus. Fur soft and thick, but not specially long. General colour greyish brown, tending in some specimens to rufous; a well-defined buff or orange line extending from between the eyes down the back nearly to the tail, shown up on each side by a broad shining black band. Under surface dull slaty buff, not sharply defined on the sides. Top of muzzle dark brown, continuous with the dark edgings to the central yellow band. Ears of medium length, fairly covered with minute hairs, uniformly blackish brown. Metapodials shining grey, digits nearly naked, whitish. Tail short, slender, about half the length of the head and body, thinly hairy, brownish black above, rather paler below, extreme tip whiteish.

Skull in general form wedge-shaped. Nasals short, their anterior end level with the middle of the incisive fissure. Interorbital region similarly rounded and unridged. Brain case broader and shorter, so that its breadth is equal to its length. Interparietal very small, a mere narrow transverse slip. Anterior edge of zygomata quite straight, the plate little developed. Incisive fissure large, quite half as large as one of the palatal foramina, which are as usual in this group, very small. Posterior nares large and open, the hinder edge of the palate level with the posterior lamina of m². Pterygoids large, projecting downward considerably below the level either of the molars or bullæ.

Incisors pale yellow, thrown forward, simple, rounded in front. Molars ³/₃, the anterior two very similar in structure to those of Xeromys, but m.¹ has its middle lamina simpler (more as in Hapalomys) and its posterior lamina is almost obsolete, while m.² has its posterior supplementary cusp more definitely postero-external, the difference in position being about due to the presence of the additional molar behind. M.¹-² quite small, transversely or obliquely oval in section. In size m.² and m.³ together are barely two thirds the length of m.¹

Below, m₁ is of the most ultra-hypsodont character, without any of the suppressed cuspidation of the anterior margin found in Xeromys, and even without the supplementary postero-external cusp found in both the Australian genera. M₁ as in Xeromys. M₂ nearly circular, about one-sixth the size of m₁, slightly longer than m₃.

== Distribution, ecology, and conservation ==
The species is endemic to the Cordillera Central mountain range, Luzon, in the Philippines, and can be found at altitudes between 925 metres (3,035 ft) to 2,700 metres (8,900 ft). It is found in a wide variety of forested and near-forest habitats, and does well even in areas highly modified by humans such as gardens and rice fields. Like other species in the genus, it is partially fossorial.

They feed primarily on earthworms and other insects. As earthworms and the golden apple snail, which the species also eats, are significant threats to rice cultivation in Luzon, methods of pest control involve trapping other rodent species such as the invasive tanezumi rat, but not the Luzon striped rats.

The IUCN assesses the Luzon striped rat as a species of Least Concern due to its large range and population and ability to live in habitats partially disturbed by humans.
