= Gerolf Steiner =

German zoologist

Gerolf Steiner (22 March 1908 – 14 August 2009) was a German zoologist.

== Life and career ==
Steiner was born in Strasbourg, Alsace in March 1908. He earned his doctorate in 1931 at the University of Heidelberg. He completed his habilitation in 1942 at the Technical University Darmstadt and 1947 at the University of Heidelberg, where he was appointed as professor in 1949. In 1962, he was an associate professor at the Technical University of Karlsruhe, becoming full professor in 1966 and occupying the chair of zoology from 1962 to 1973. He died five months after his 101st birthday on August 14, 2009 in Heidelberg.

== Rhinogradentia ==
Steiner is best known for a 1961 book authored pseudonymously as Harald Stümpke on the anatomy and habits of the rhinogradentia, a fictitious order of extinct mammals whose nose evolved in unusual ways.

He has published also under the pseudonyms of Justus Andereich, Trotzhard Wiederumb, and Karl D.S. Geeste.

== Publications ==
- Die Automatie und die zentrale Beeinflussung des Herzens von Periplaneta americana. Heidelberg (1932).
- Methodische Untersuchungen über die Geruchsorientierung von Fleischfliegen. Springer, Berlin (1942).
- with Richard Sternfeld, Die Reptilien und Amphibien Mitteleuropas. Quelle & Meyer, Heidelberg (1952).
- Harald Stümpke (pseud.), Bau und Leben der Rhinogradentia with preface and illustrations by Gerolf Steiner. Fischer, Stuttgart, (1961). ISBN 3-437-30083-0.
- Harald Stümpke (pseud.), Anatomie Et Biologie Des Rhinogrades — Un Nouvel Ordre De Mammifères. Masson, France (1962).
- Das zoologische Laboratorium. Schweizerbart, Stuttgart (1963).
- Harald Stümpke (pseud.), The Snouters: Form and Life of the Rhinogrades. Translated by Leigh Chadwick. The University of Chicago Press (1967).
- Trotzhard Wiederump (pseud.): Wie werde ich Diktator : ein Leitfaden für Männer und Frauen beiderlei Geschlechts in Familie, Gesellschaft, Wirtschaft, Wissenschaft und Politik. Heinz Moos Verlag, Gräfelfing, (1968).
- Justus Andereich (pseud.), Nebenergebnisse aus 1001 Sitzungen : Gesammelt zu Trost und Anregung für Mitsitzende, Mitleidende und Mitfühlende. Moos, Gräfelfing, (1968).
- Zoomorphologie in Umrissen. Gustav-Fischer, VEB, Jena (1977).
- Wort-Elemente der wichtigsten zoologischen Fachausdrücke Fischer, Stuttgart (1980).
- Karl D.S. Geeste (pseud.), Stümpke's Rhinogradentia: Versuch einer Analyse. Essays, historical remarks, and an interview of H. Stümpke. (2nd printing 1988).
- Wir sind zu viele - was tun? Paul Parey, Hamburg (1992) ISBN 3-489-53834-X.
- Shutyunpuke Hararuto (= Stümpke Harald, pseud.): Bikōri: atarashiku hakken sareta honyūrui-no-kōzō-to seikatsu. Hakuhinsha, Tōkyō (1997). ISBN 4-938706-19-9.
- Tierzeichnungen in Kürzeln. : Gustav-Fischer, Stuttgart (1982); Spektrum Akademischer Verlag, Heidelberg, 3rd ed. (2006), ISBN 978-3-8274-1702-2.

He also provided six illustrations for the following musical work:

- Karl Andereich: Tema con variazioni. Konkordia, Bühl (1932).
