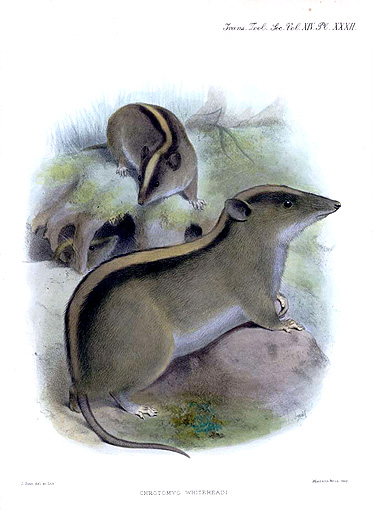
- Luzon striped rat (Chrotomys whiteheadi)

Scientific classification
- Domain: Eukaryota
- Kingdom: Animalia
- Phylum: Chordata
- Class: Mammalia
- Order: Rodentia
- Family: Muridae
- Subfamily: Murinae
- Genus: Chrotomys; Thomas, 1895

Type species
- Chrotomys whiteheadi

Species
- Chrotomys whiteheadi Chrotomys mindorensis Chrotomys gonzalesi Chrotomys silaceus Chrotomys sibuyanensis

= Chrotomys =

Genus of rodents

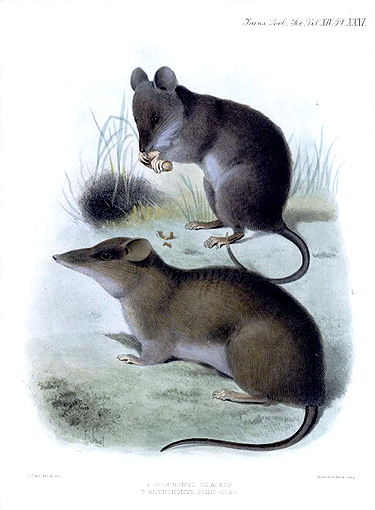
Chrotomys silaceus (upper animal)

The genus Chrotomys contain a unique group of rodents found only in the Philippines, specifically the islands of Luzon, Mindoro, and Sibuyan. Instead of being predominantly herbivorous or omnivorous like other murines, these rats feed predominantly on invertebrates although they do eat some vegetable matter. This vermivory is probably the result of a rat-like animal moving into an ecological niche usually filled by shrews. Shrews and other insectivores are absent on these Philippine islands.

== Taxonomy ==
Rickart et al. (2005) found that C. mindorensis, C. whiteheadi, and C. gonzalesi are closely related whereas C. silaceus and C. sibuyanensis represent earlier offshoots of the genus. Several authors place C. silaceus in the genus Celaenomys, but Rickart et al. (2005) suggest that neither genetic nor morphometric distance warrant it.

These rats are considered "old endemics" and are probably the result of one of the first colonisations of the Philippine islands. Other murines colonised the islands at a later time and are more closely related to mainland murines.

== Species ==
Genus Chrotomys - Luzon striped rats

- Luzon striped rat, Chrotomys whiteheadi
- Mindoro striped rat, Chrotomys mindorensis
- Isarog striped shrew-rat, Chrotomys gonzalesi
- Blazed Luzon shrew-rat, Chrotomys silaceus
- Sibuyan striped shrew-rat, Chrotomys sibuyanensis

=== Relationships as inferred by cytochrome b ===
- Chrotomys
  - Chrotomys silaceus
  - - Chrotomys sibuyanensis
    - - Chrotomys gonzalesi
      - Chrotomys whiteheadi

=== Relationships as inferred by morphology ===
- Chrotomys
  - - Chrotomys sibuyanensis
    - Chrotomys silaceus
  - - Chrotomys gonzalesi
    - - Chrotomys mindorensis
      - Chrotomys whiteheadi
