= List of mammals of Japan =

This is a list of mammal species recorded in Japan (excluding domesticated and captive populations). Of the 172 species of mammal found in Japan—112 native terrestrial mammals (those that are endemic are identified below; this number includes 37 species of bat), 19 introduced species, 40 species of Cetacea, and the dugong—161 are listed for the Japan region on the IUCN Red List of Threatened Species: of these, three taxa are critically endangered (Muennink's spiny rat, Yanbaru whiskered bat, and gloomy tube-nosed bat), twenty-two are endangered, eight are vulnerable, and eleven are near threatened; the Japanese sea lion and Bonin or Sturdee's pipistrelle are evaluated as extinct. Although on a global level the grey wolf is assessed as least concern, the two Japanese subspecies, Hokkaido wolf and Japanese wolf, are further recent extinctions; the 2020 Japanese Ministry of the Environment Red List also lists as extinct the Okinawa flying fox and Japanese river otter, as well as the subspecies Miyako little horseshoe bat.

As of January 2023, for their protection, fifteen species and subspecies have been designated national endangered species by cabinet order in accordance with the 1992 Act on Conservation of Endangered Species of Wild Fauna and Flora.

The following tags are used to highlight each species' conservation status as assessed by the International Union for Conservation of Nature:

EX	Extinct	No reasonable doubt that the last individual has died.
EW	Extinct in the wild	Known only to survive in captivity or as (a) naturalized population(s) well outside its previous range.
CR	Critically endangered	The species is facing an extremely high risk of extinction in the wild.
EN	Endangered	The species is facing a very high risk of extinction in the wild.
VU	Vulnerable	The species is facing a high risk of extinction in the wild.
NT	Near threatened	The species does not currently meet the criteria for CR, EN, or VU but is close or likely to do so in the near future.
LC	Least concern	The species has been evaluated and does not meet the qualifying criteria for CR, EN, VU, or NT.
DD	Data deficient	There is inadequate information to assess the risk of extinction of this species.

== Order: Sirenia (manatees and dugongs) ==
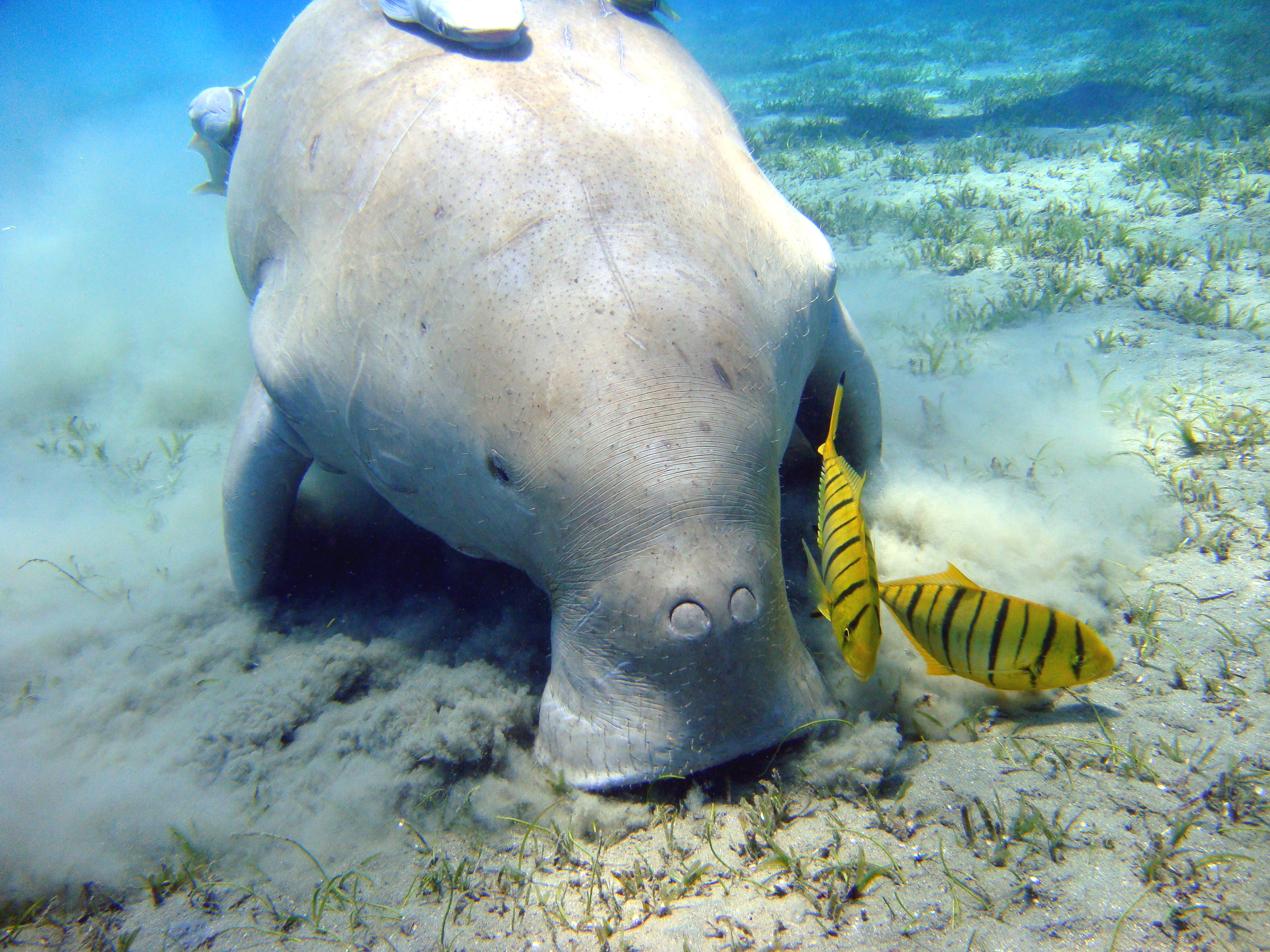
Dugong

Sirenia is an order of fully aquatic, herbivorous mammals that inhabit rivers, estuaries, coastal marine waters, swamps, and marine wetlands. All four species are endangered.

- Family: Dugongidae
  - Genus: Dugong
    - Dugong, Dugong dugon VU^{IUCN} (MOE: CR) (northern Okinawa Island; the northernmost population globally; designated a Natural Monument under the Law for the Protection of Cultural Properties)

== Order: Primates ==
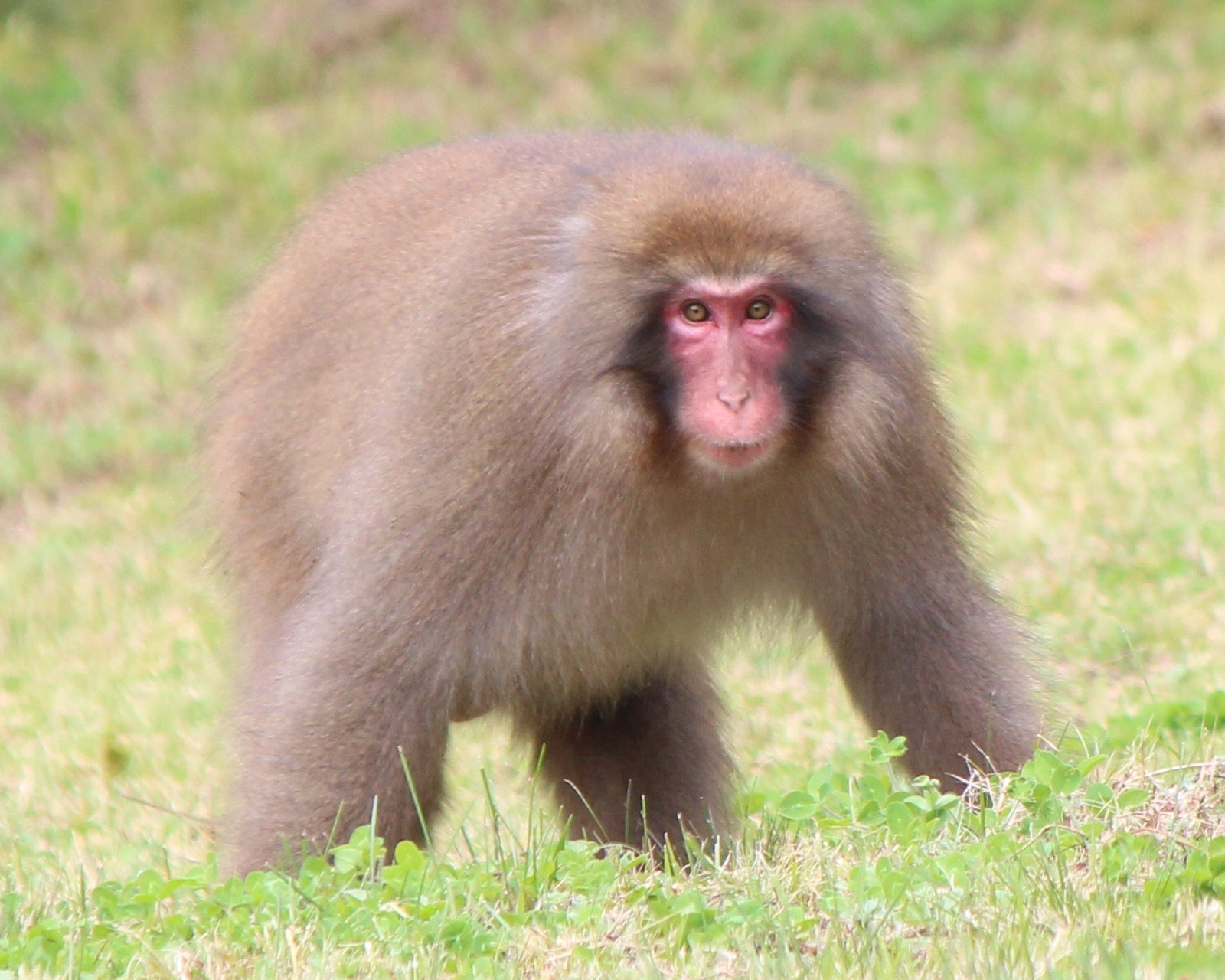
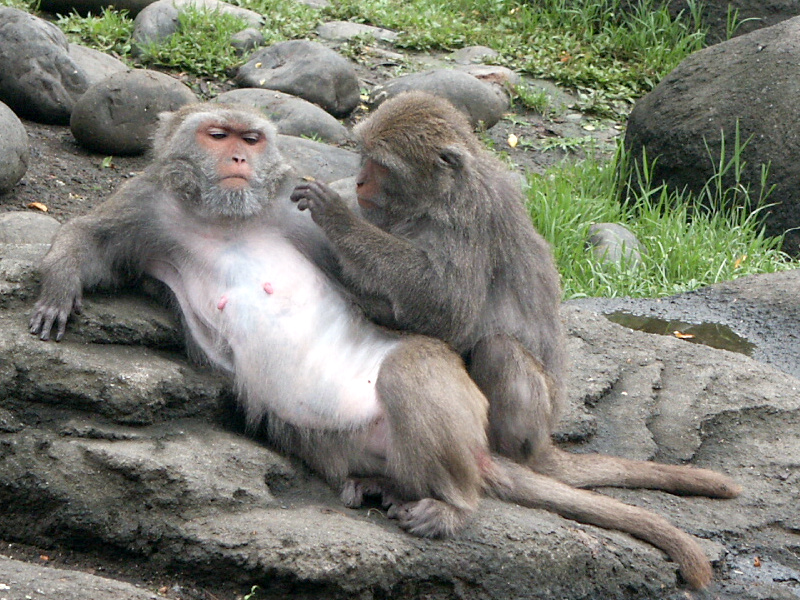
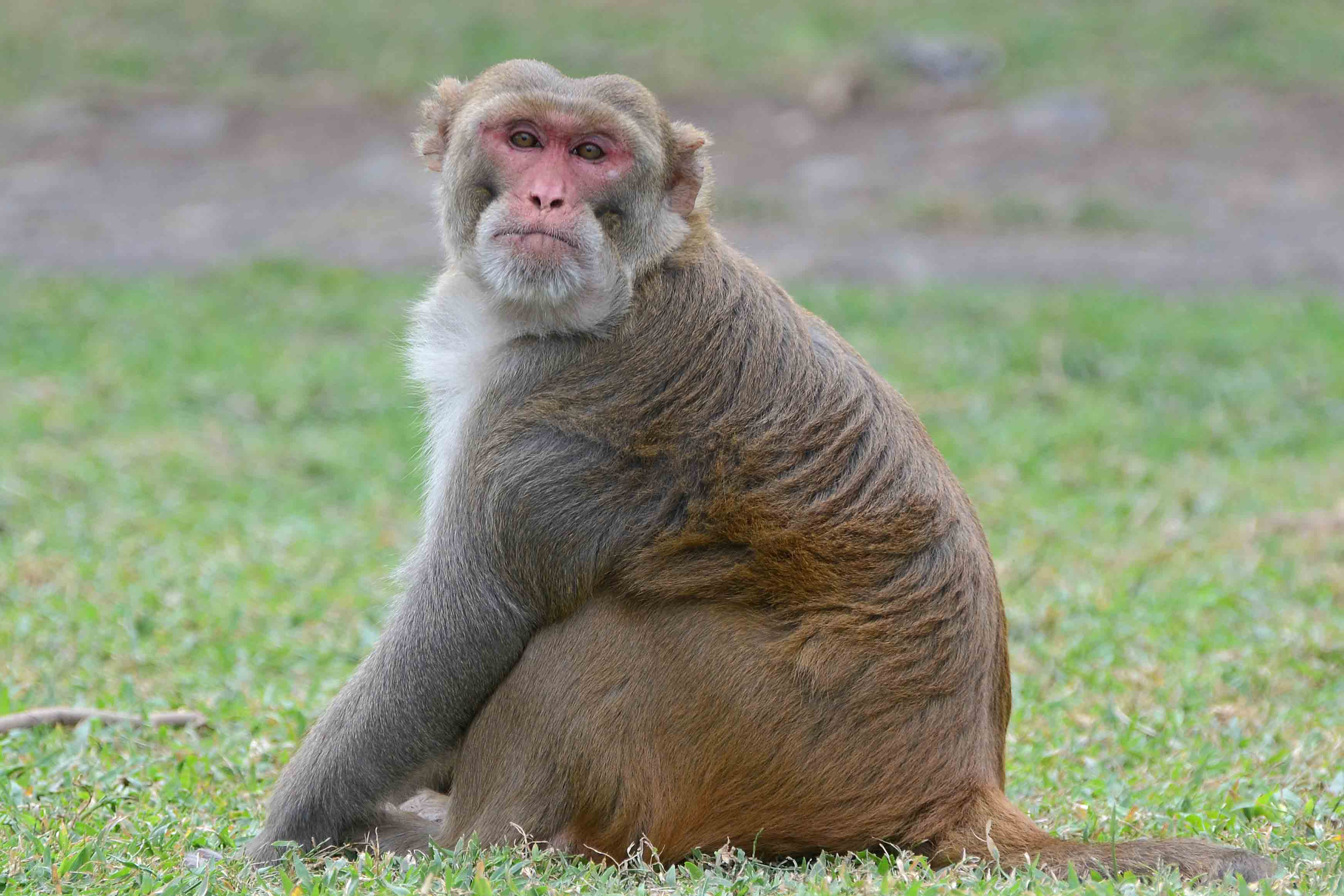
Japanese macaque, Taiwanese macaque, rhesus macaque

The order Primates contains humans and their closest relatives: lemurs, lorisoids, monkeys, and apes.

- Suborder: Haplorhini
  - Infraorder: Simiiformes
    - Parvorder: Catarrhini
      - Superfamily: Cercopithecoidea
        - Family: Cercopithecidae (Old World monkeys)
          - Genus: Macaca
            - Japanese macaque, Macaca fuscata LC^{IUCN} (Honshū, Shikoku, Kyūshū, and adjacent smaller islands; the Aomori population are the northernmost non-human primates; several populations and/or related habitats have been designated Natural Monuments, including those on the Shimokita Peninsula)
              - M. f. fuscata
              - Yakushima macaque, M. f. yakui
            - Formosan rock macaque, Macaca cyclopis LC^{IUCN} (introduced species; those on the Shimokita Peninsula were removed in 2004)
            - Rhesus macaque, Macaca mulatta LC^{IUCN} (feral individuals observed on the Bōsō Peninsula in Chiba

== Order: Rodentia (rodents) ==
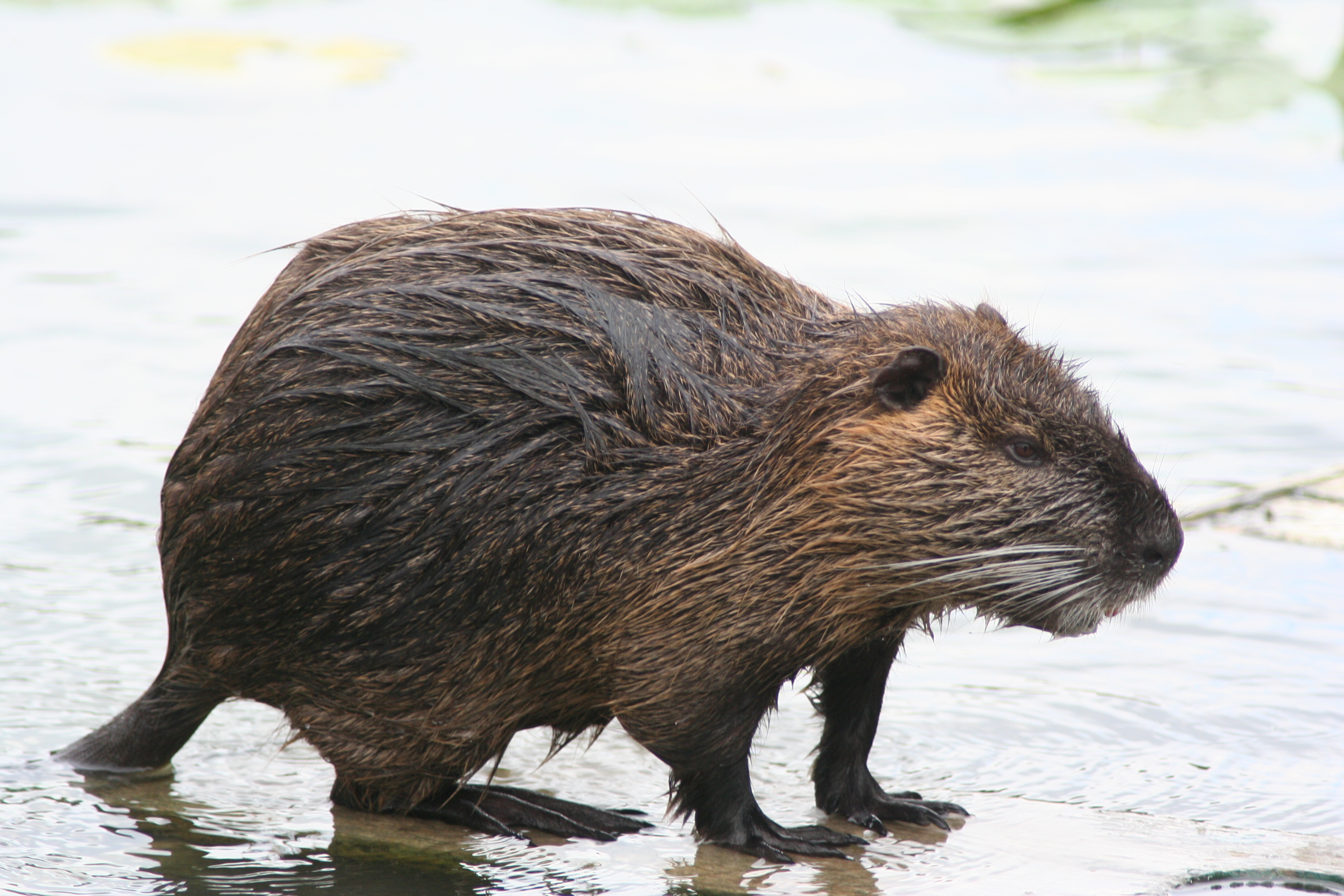
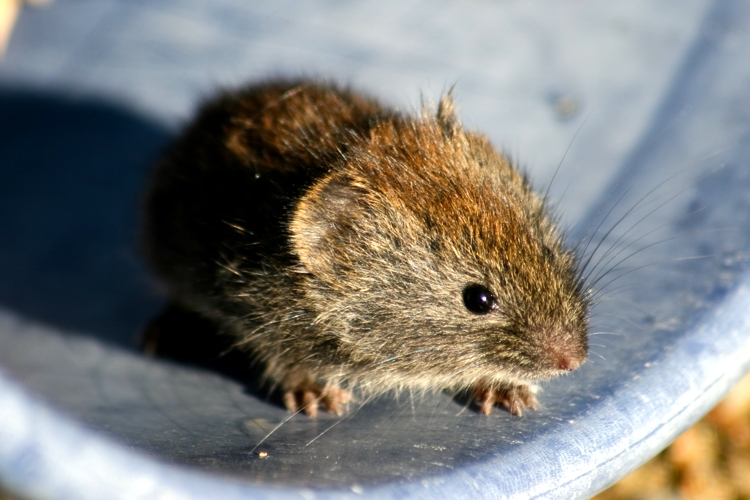
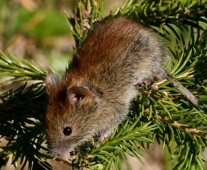
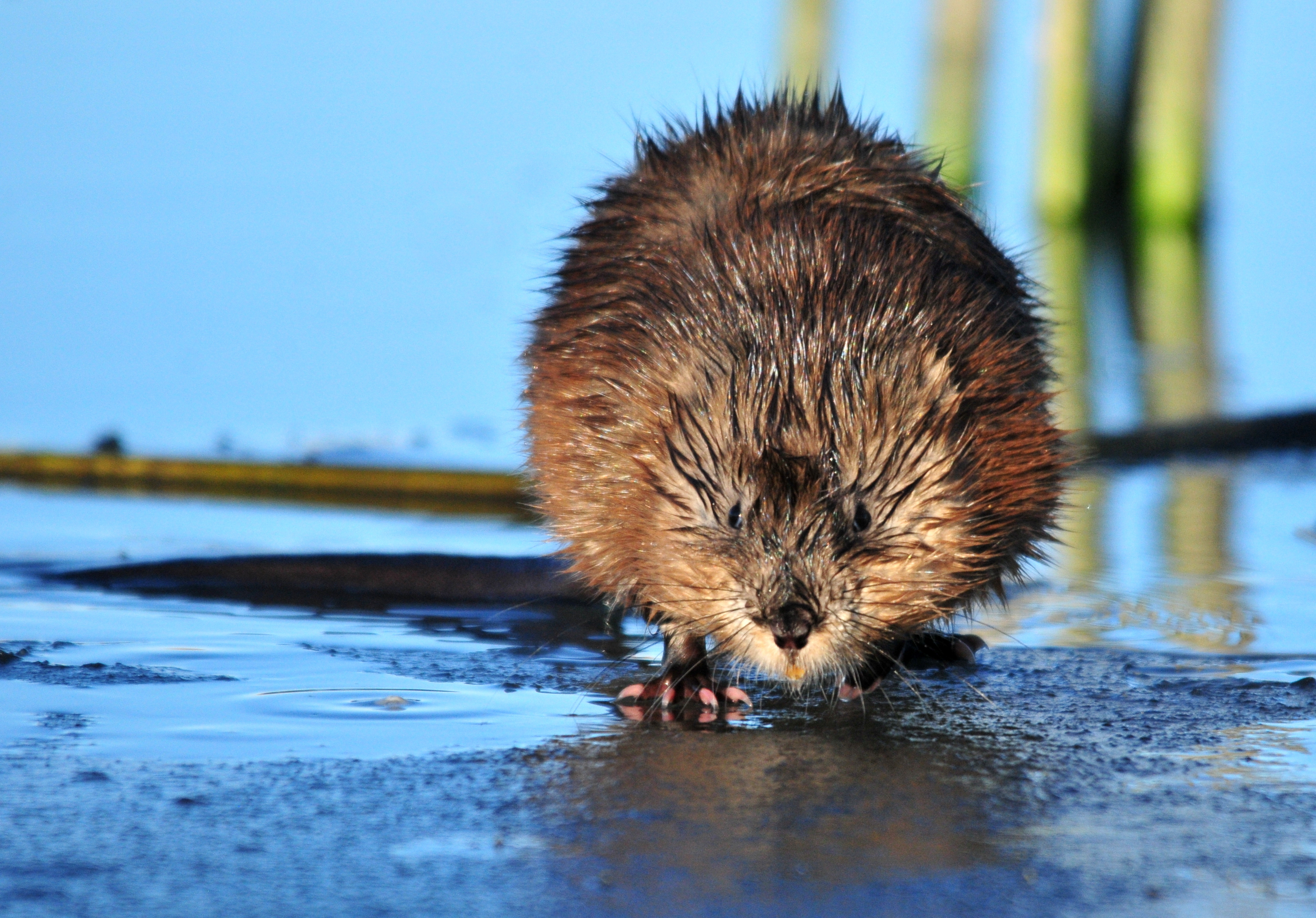
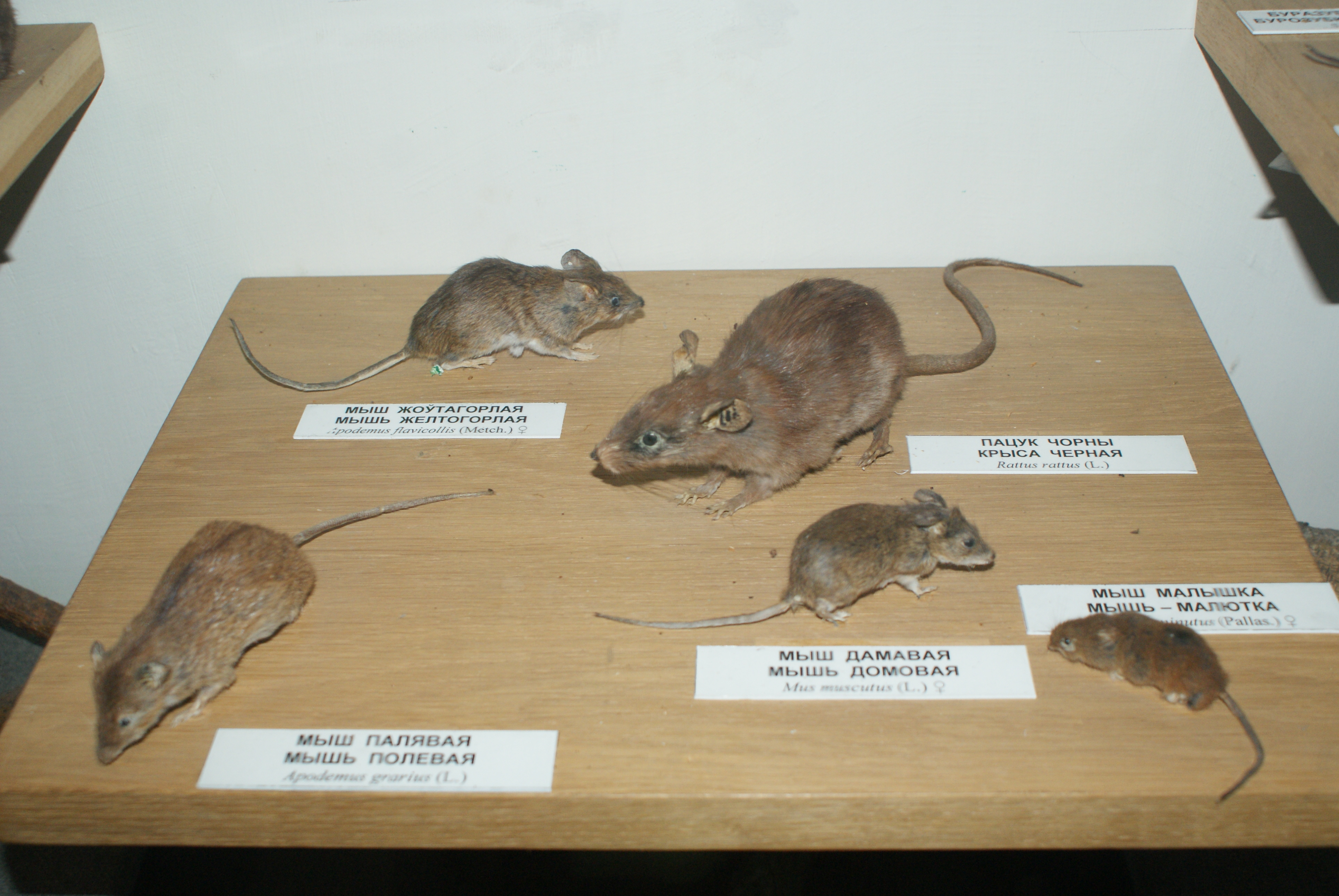
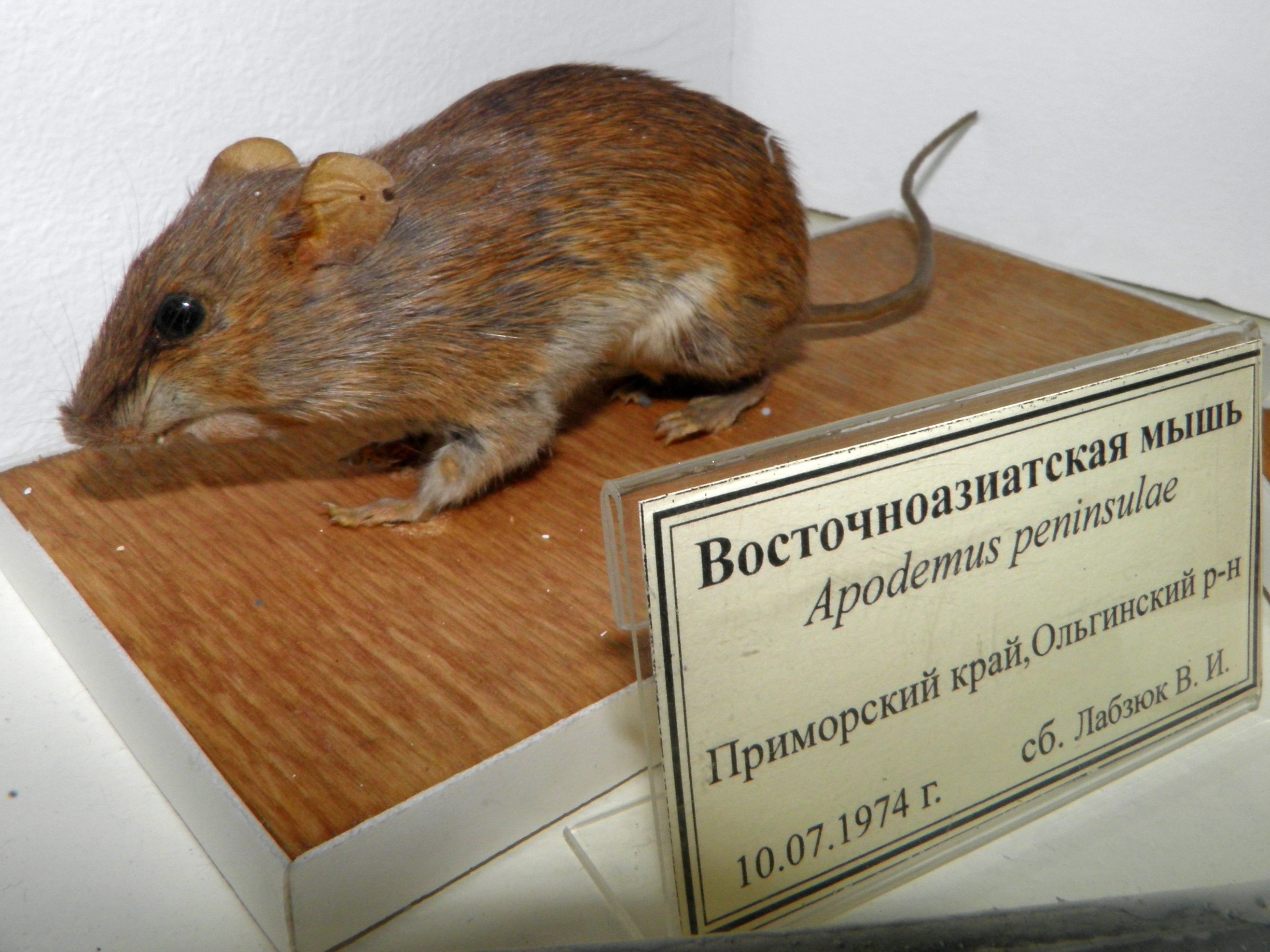
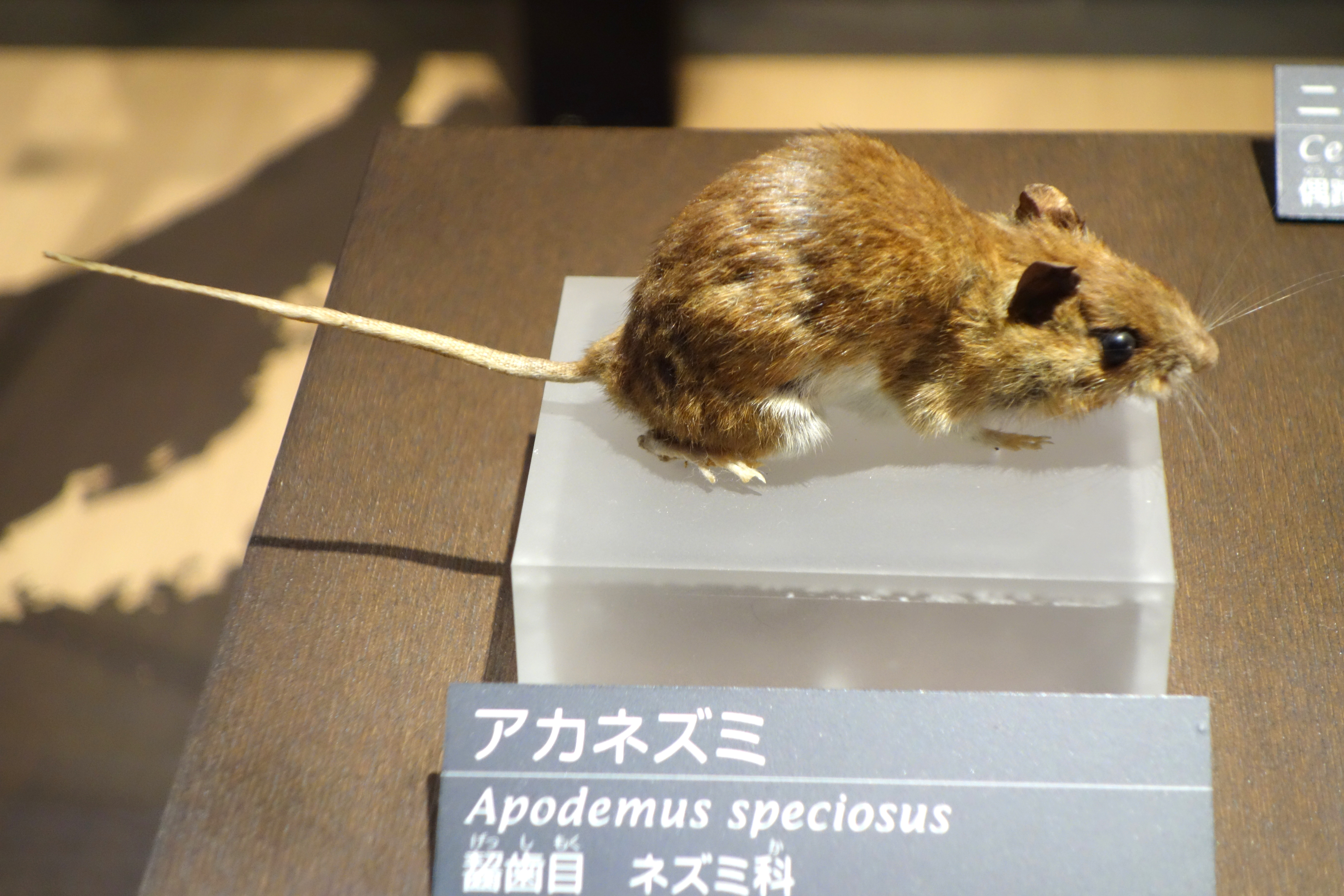
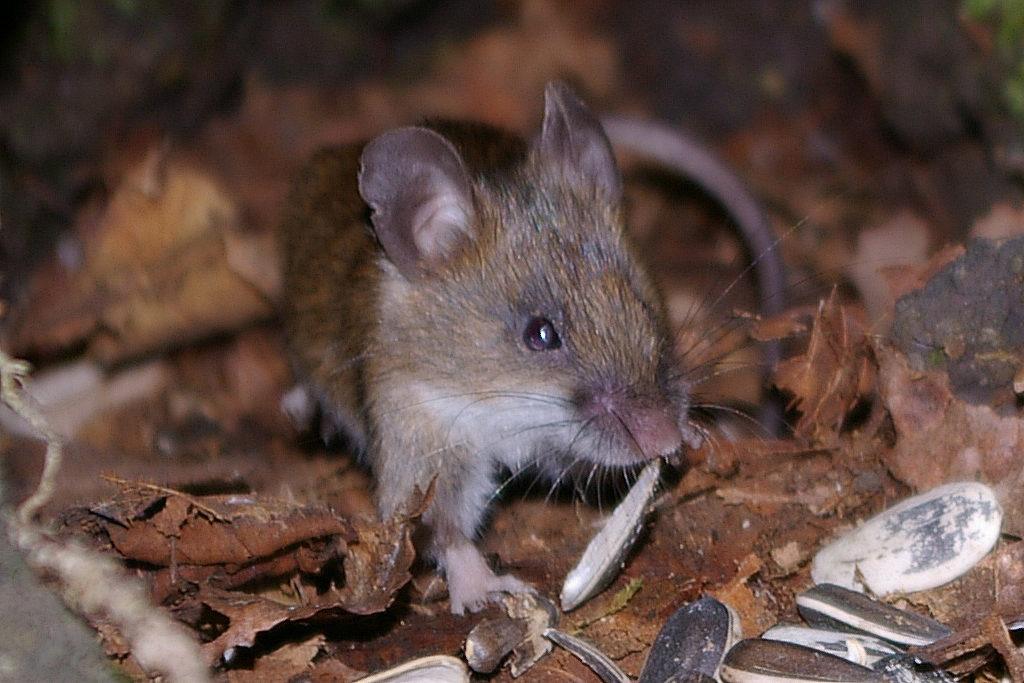
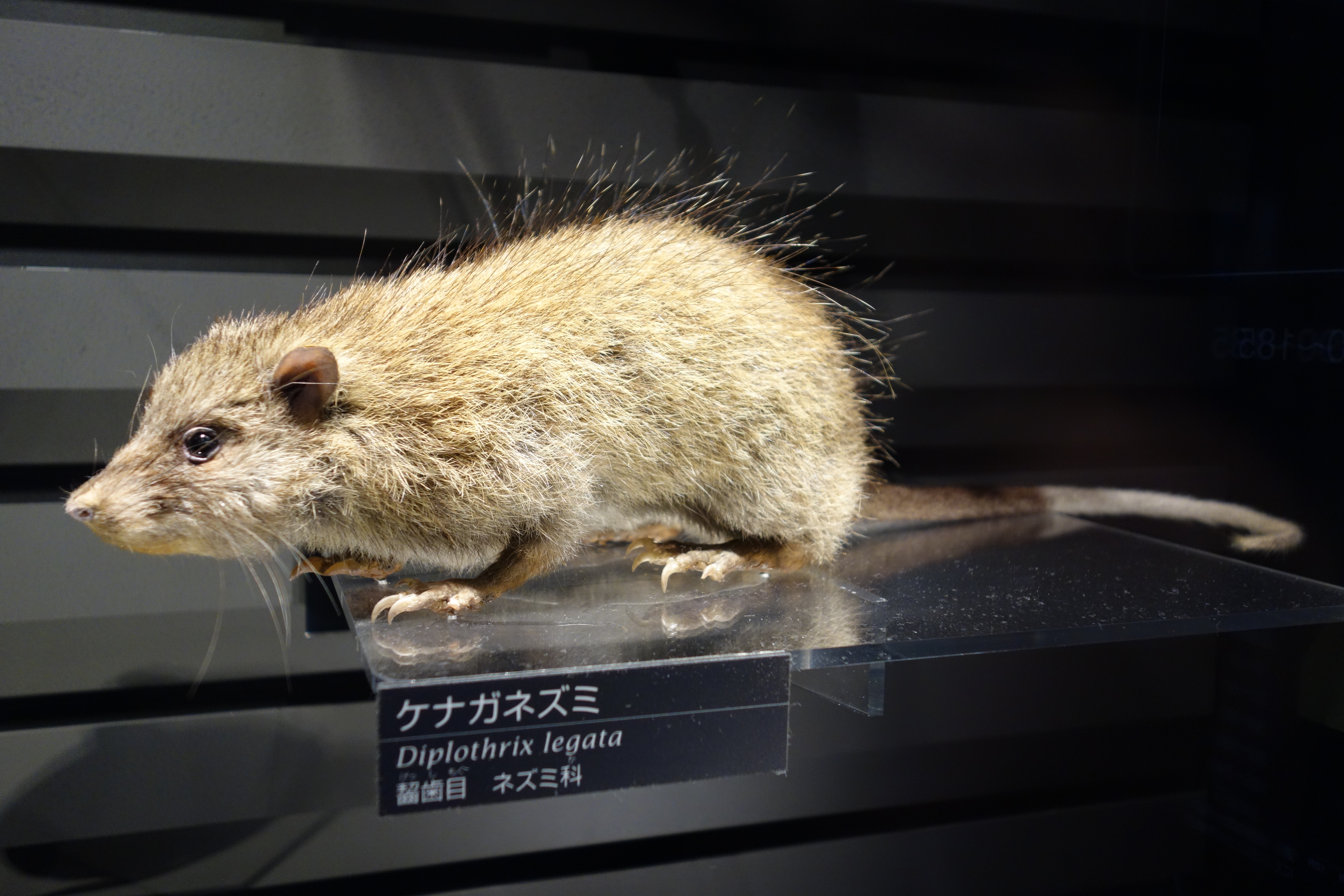
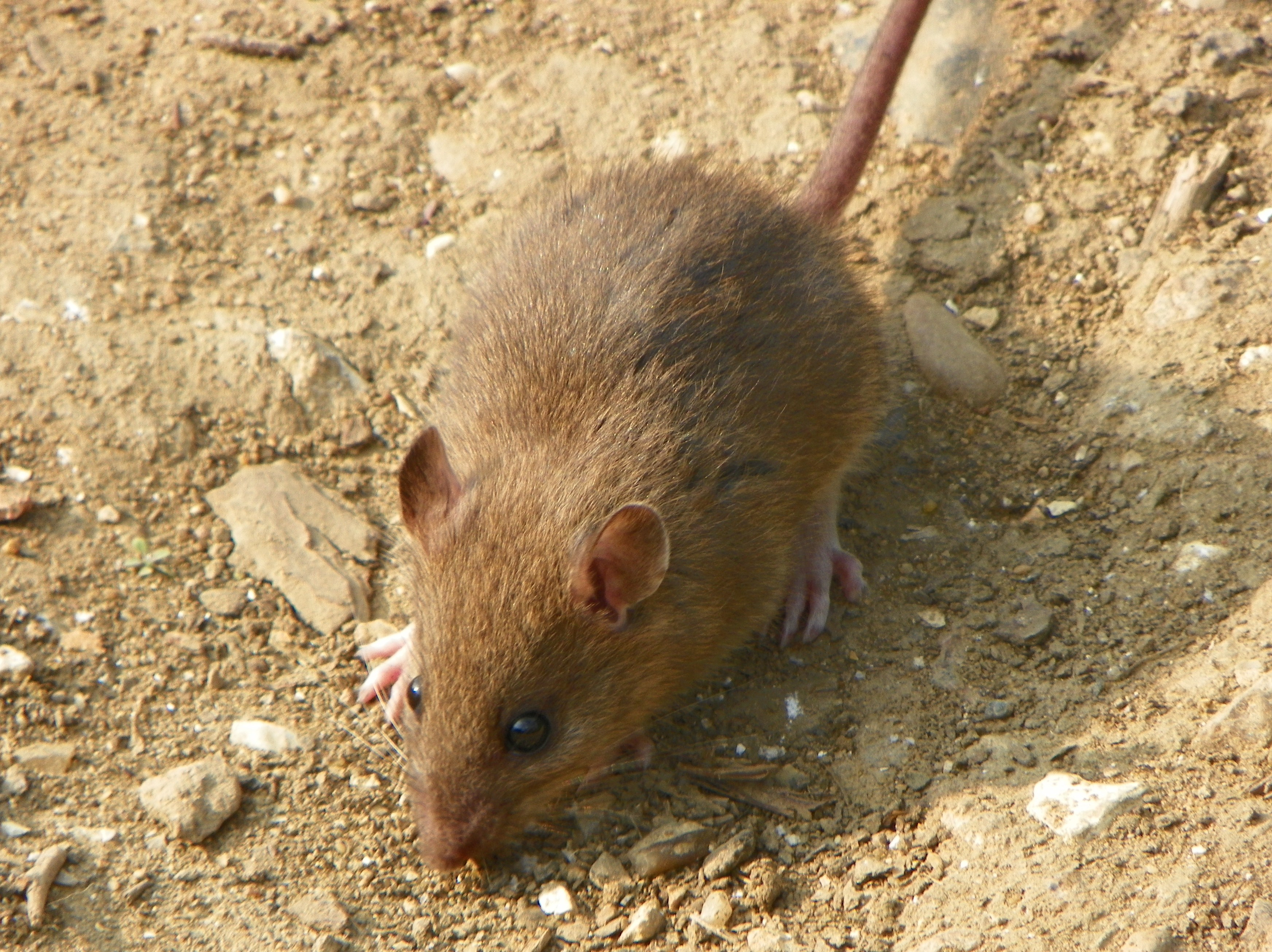
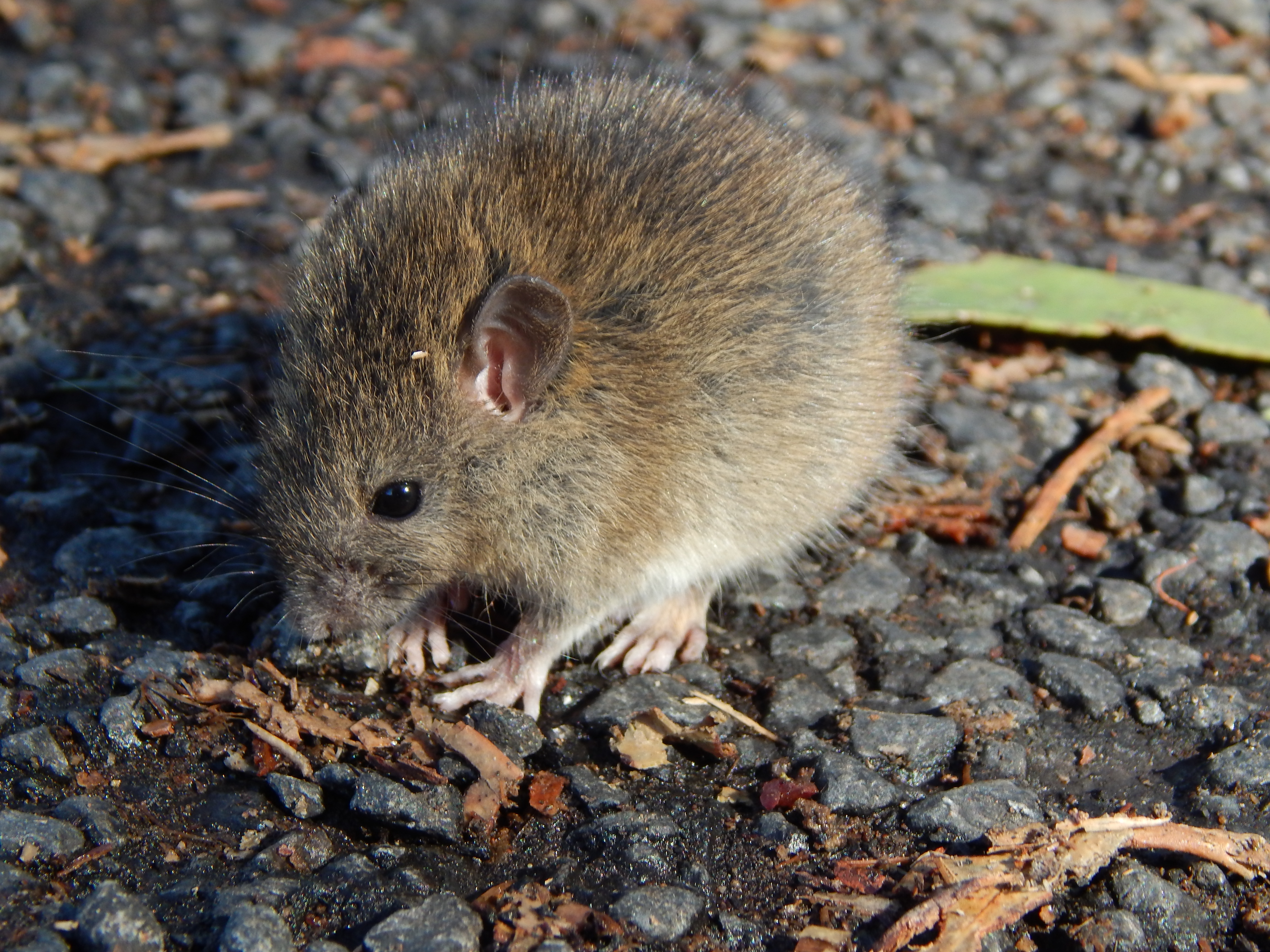
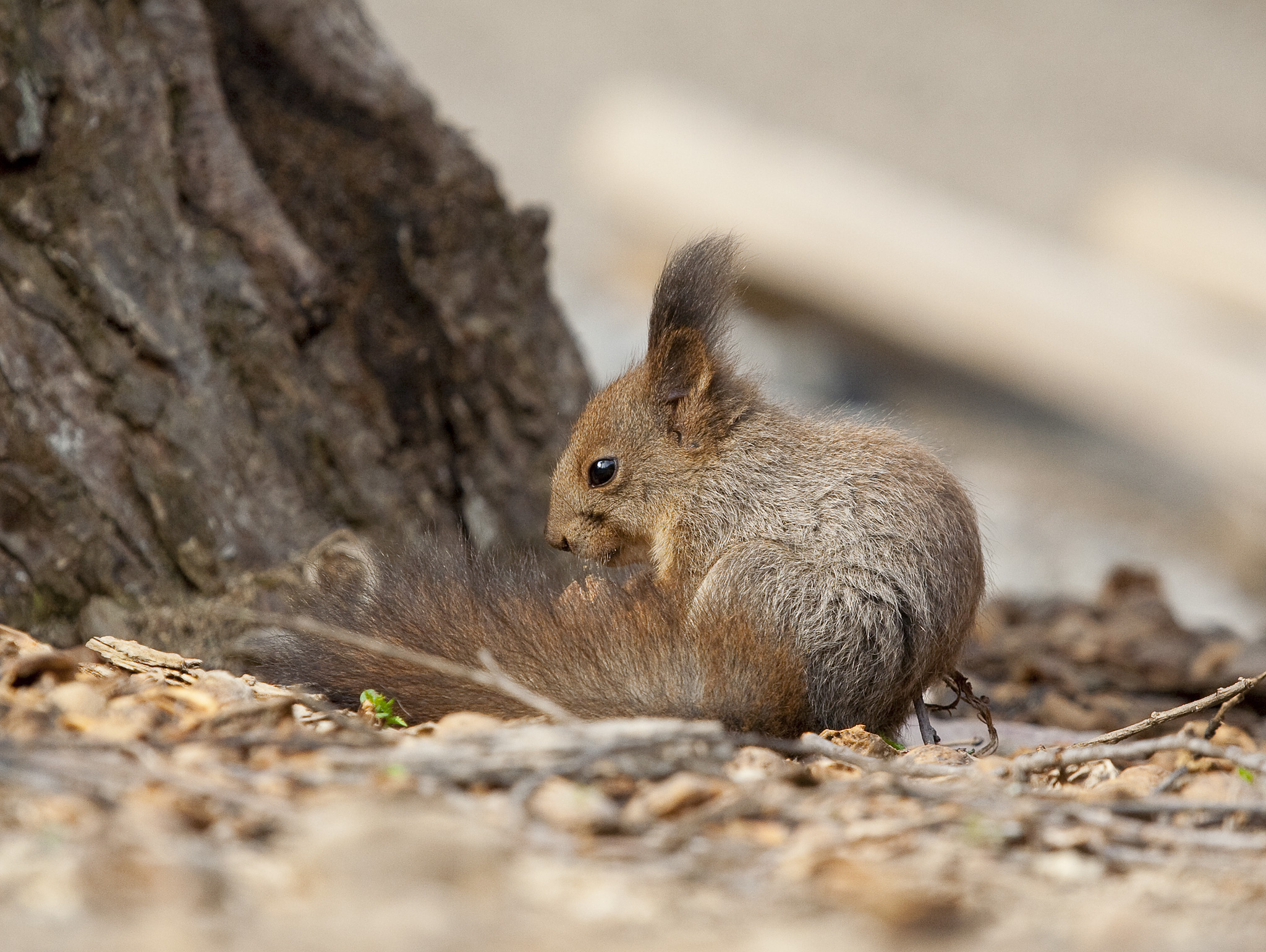
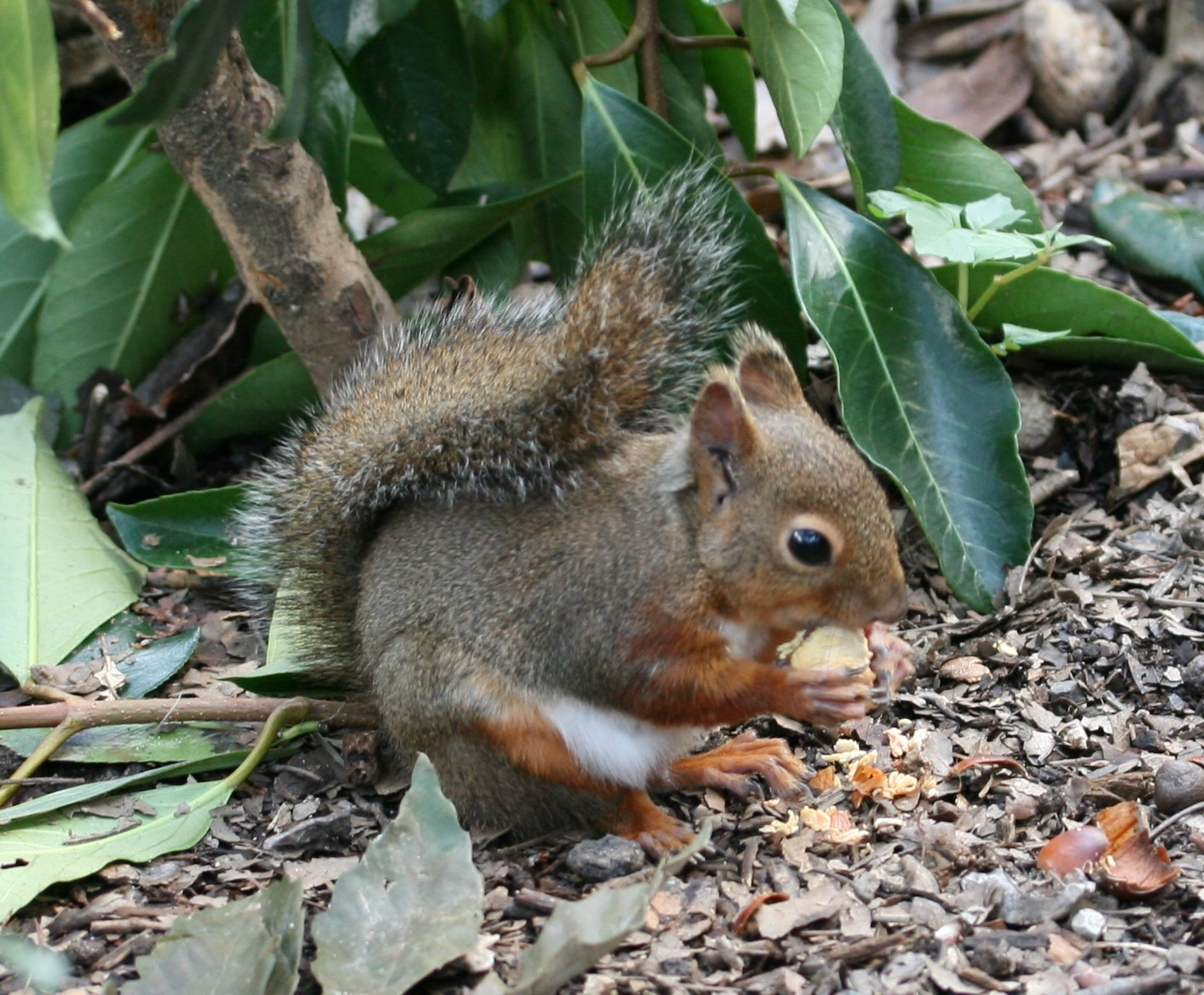
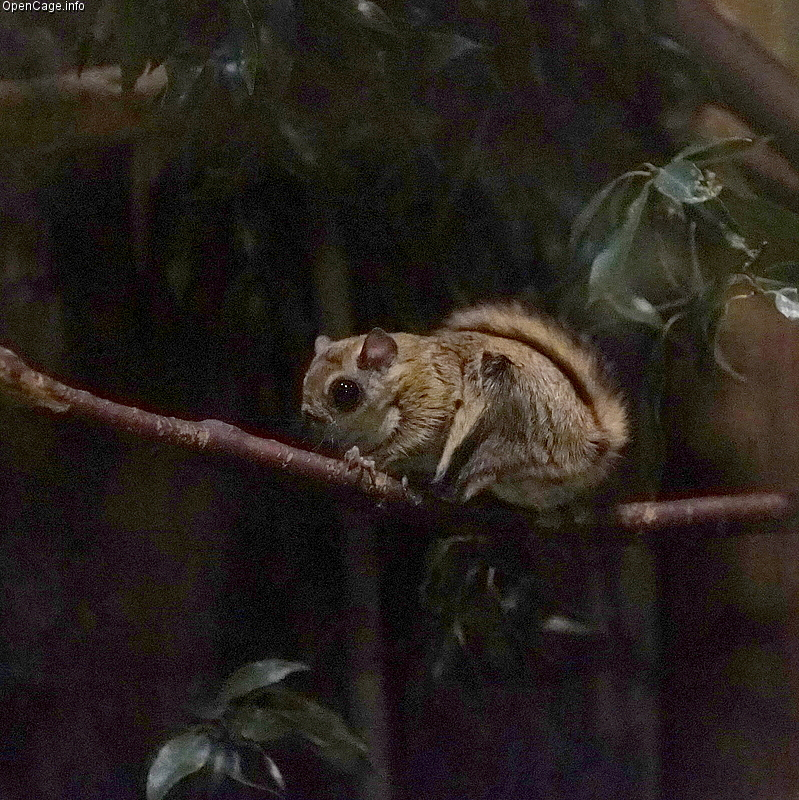
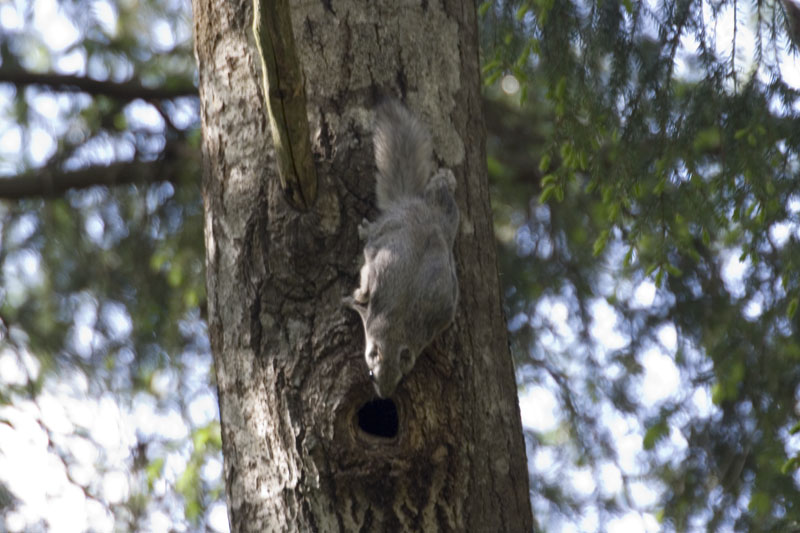
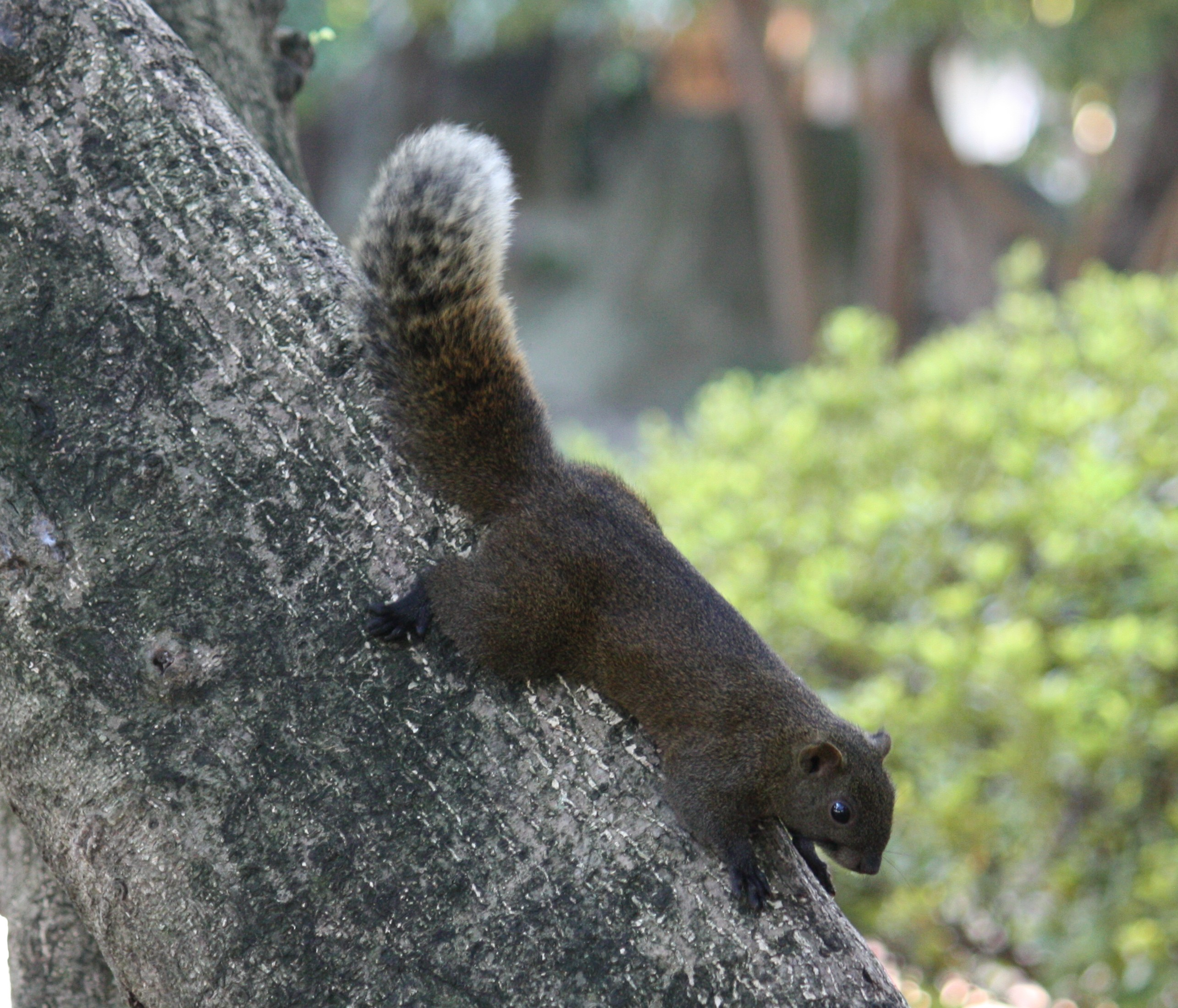
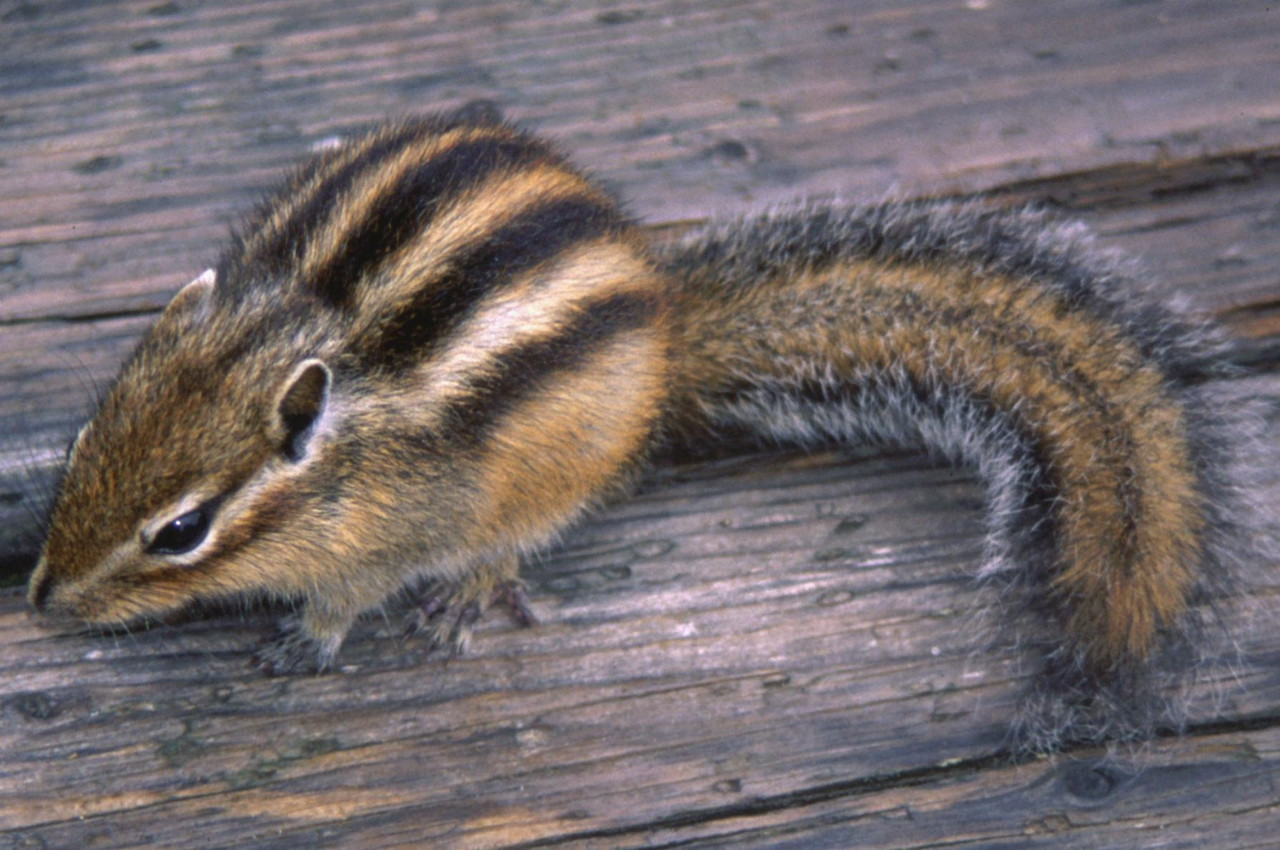
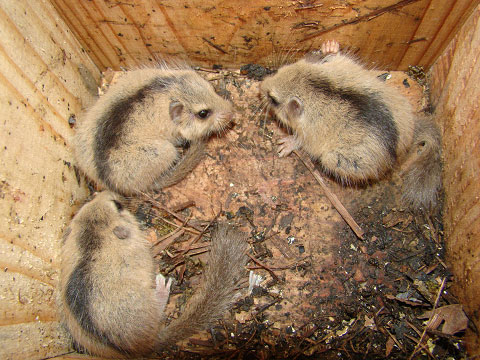
Coypu, grey red-backed vole, northern red-backed vole, muskrat, group (striped field mouse, black rat, harvest mouse, house mouse), Korean field mouse, large Japanese field mouse, small Japanese field mouse, Ryukyu long-tailed giant rat, brown rat, Polynesian rat, Hokkaido squirrel, Japanese squirrel, Japanese dwarf flying squirrel, Pallas's squirrel, Siberian flying squirrel, Ezo chipmunk, Japanese dormouse

Rodents make up the largest order of mammals, with over 40% of mammalian species. They have two incisors in the upper and lower jaw which grow continually and must be kept short by gnawing. Most rodents are small though the capybara can weigh up to 45 kg (99 lb).

- Suborder: Hystricomorpha
  - Family: Echimyidae (spiny rats)
    - Subfamily: Echimyinae
      - Genus: Myocastor
        - Coypu, Myocastor coypus LC^{IUCN} (introduced from South America)
- Suborder: Myomorpha
  - Family: Cricetidae (hamsters, voles, lemmings, and New World rats and mice)
    - Subfamily: Arvicolinae
      - Genus: Alexandromys
        - Japanese grass vole, Alexandromys montebelli LC^{IUCN} (endemic; Honshū, Kyūshū, Sado Island, Notojima)
      - Genus: Craseomys
        - Grey red-backed vole, Craseomys rufocanus LC^{IUCN} (Hokkaidō and adjacent smaller islands)
          - Bedford's red-backed vole, C. r. bedfordiae
        - Hokkaido red-backed vole, Craseomys rex LC^{IUCN} (Hokkaidō and adjacent smaller islands)
          - Mountain red-backed vole, C. r. montanus (MOE: NT) (Hokkaidō and adjacent smaller islands)
          - Rishiri red-backed vole, C. r. rex (MOE: NT) (Rishiri Island)
        - Japanese red-backed vole, Craseomys andersoni LC^{IUCN} (endemic; central and northern Honshū)
        - Smith's red-backed vole, Craseomys smithii LC^{IUCN} (endemic; Honshū, Shikoku, Kyūshū)
      - Genus: Clethrionomys
        - Northern red-backed vole, Clethrionomys rutilus LC^{IUCN} (Hokkaidō)
          - C. r. mikado
      - Genus: Ondatra
        - Muskrat, Ondatra zibethicus LC^{IUCN} (introduced from North America)
  - Family: Muridae (mice, rats, gerbils, etc.)
    - Subfamily: Murinae
      - Genus: Apodemus
        - Striped field mouse, Apodemus agrarius LC^{IUCN} (MOE: CR) (Uotsuri Island)
        - Korean field mouse, Apodemus peninsulae LC^{IUCN} (Hokkaidō)
          - A. p. giliacus
        - Large Japanese field mouse, Apodemus speciosus LC^{IUCN} (widely distributed; not found in Okinawa)
          - A. s. ainu
          - A. s. speciosus
        - Small Japanese field mouse, Apodemus argenteus LC^{IUCN} (widely distributed; not found in Okinawa)
          - A. a. argenteus
          - A. a. hokkaidi
          - A. a. yakui
      - Genus: Tokudaia
        - Muennink's spiny rat, Tokudaia muenninki CR^{IUCN} (MOE: CR) (endemic to Okinawa Island; Natural Monument)
        - Ryukyu spiny rat, Tokudaia osimensis EN^{IUCN} (MOE: EN) (endemic to Amami Ōshima; Natural Monument)
        - Tokunoshima spiny rat, Tokudaia tokunoshimensis EN^{IUCN} (MOE: EN) (endemic to Tokunoshima; Natural Monument)
      - Genus: Diplothrix
        - Ryukyu long-tailed giant rat, Diplothrix legata EN^{IUCN} (MOE: EN) (endemic to Amami Ōshima, Tokunoshima, and Okinawa Island; Natural Monument)
      - Genus: Rattus
        - Brown rat, Rattus norvegicus LC^{IUCN} (concentrated in urban areas)
        - Polynesian rat, Rattus exulans LC^{IUCN} (introduced onto Miyako Island)
        - Tanezumi rat, Rattus tanezumi LC^{IUCN} (concentrated in urban areas)
      - Genus: Micromys
        - Harvest mouse, Micromys minutus LC^{IUCN} (not found in Hokkaidō, Tōhoku, Okinawa)
      - Genus: Mus
        - Ryukyu mouse, Mus caroli LC^{IUCN} (Okinawa Island)
        - House mouse, Mus musculus LC^{IUCN} (widely distributed; commensal with humans)
- Suborder: Sciuromorpha
  - Family: Sciuridae (squirrels)
    - Subfamily: Sciurinae
      - Tribe: Sciurini
        - Genus: Sciurus
          - Eurasian red squirrel, Sciurus vulgaris LC^{IUCN}
            - Ezo red squirrel, S. v. orientis (Hokkaidō)
          - Japanese squirrel, Sciurus lis LC^{IUCN} (endemic; Honshū and Shikoku; no recent records from Kyūshū or Awaji Island)
      - Tribe: Pteromyini
        - Genus: Petaurista
          - Japanese giant flying squirrel, Petaurista leucogenys LC^{IUCN} (endemic; Honshū, Shikoku, and Kyūshū)
        - Genus: Pteromys
          - Japanese dwarf flying squirrel, Pteromys momonga LC^{IUCN} (endemic; Honshū, Shikoku, Kyūshū)
          - Siberian flying squirrel, Pteromys volans LC^{IUCN} (found on Hokkaidō, as P. v. orii)
            - Ezo flying squirrel, P. v. orii (Hokkaidō)
    - Subfamily: Callosciurinae
      - Tribe: Callosciurini
        - Genus: Callosciurus
          - Pallas's squirrel, Callosciurus erythraeus LC^{IUCN} (introduced; naturalized populations from Ibaraki to Miyazaki)
    - Subfamily: Xerinae
      - Tribe: Marmotini
        - Genus: Eutamias
          - Siberian chipmunk, Eutamias sibiricus LC^{IUCN} (Hokkaidō and adjacent smaller islands)
            - Ezo chipmunk, E. s. lineatus (MOE: DD, as Tamias sibiricus lineatus)
  - Family: Gliridae (dormice)
    - Subfamily: Glirinae
      - Genus: Glirulus
        - Japanese dormouse, Glirulus japonicus LC^{IUCN} (endemic; Honshū, Shikoku, Kyūshū, Dōgojima; Natural Monument)

== Order: Lagomorpha (hares, rabbits, and pikas) ==
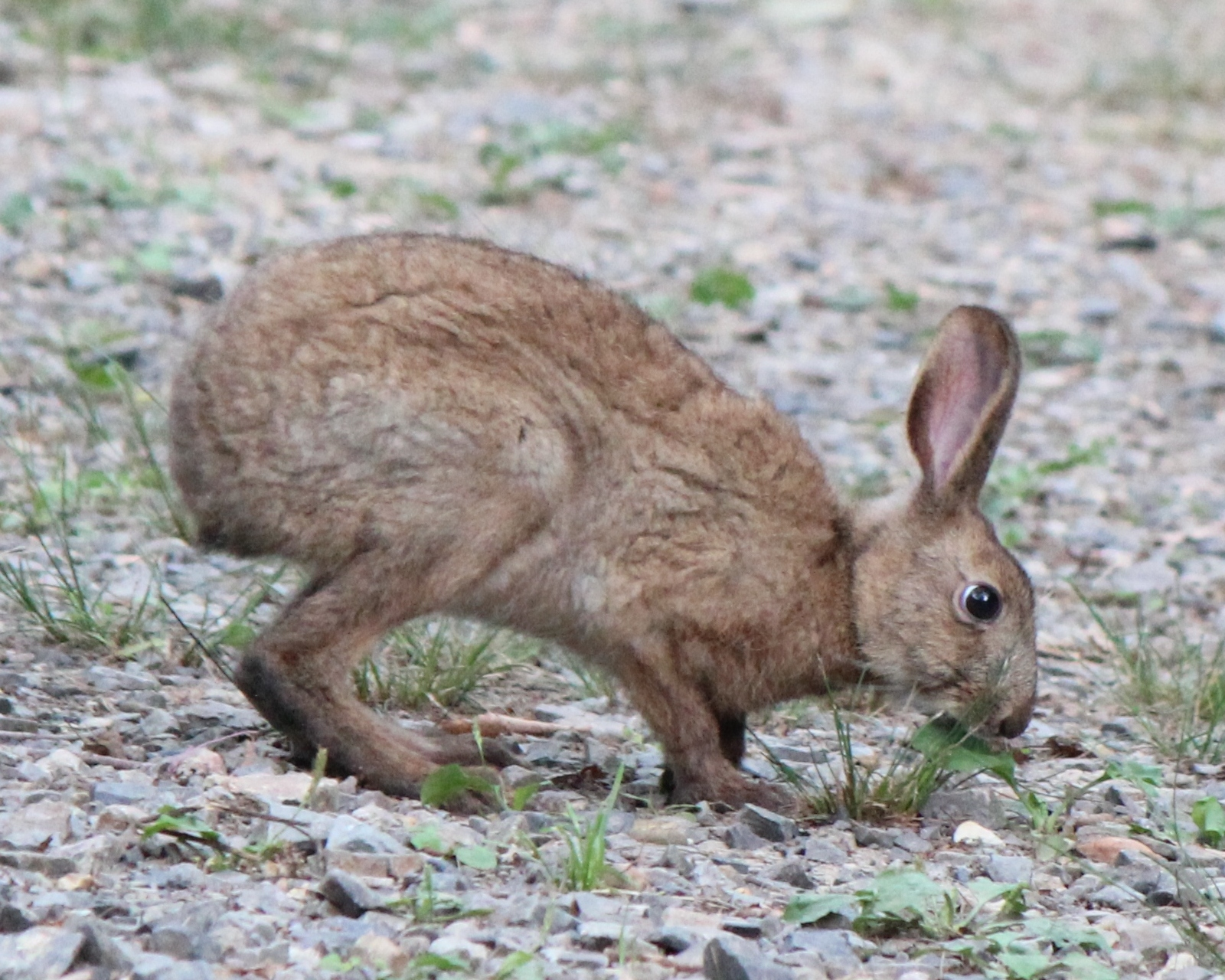
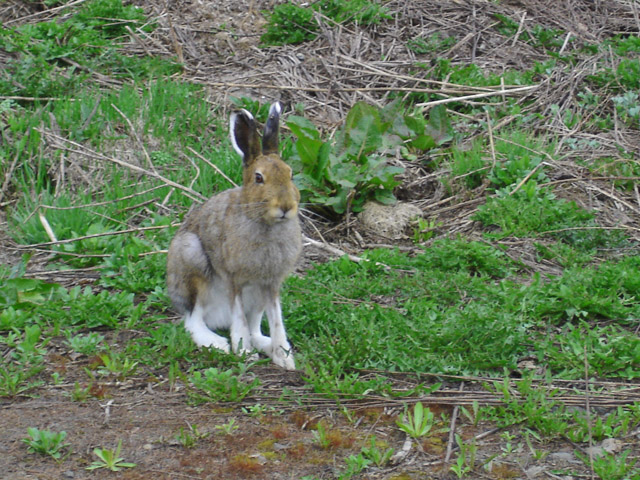
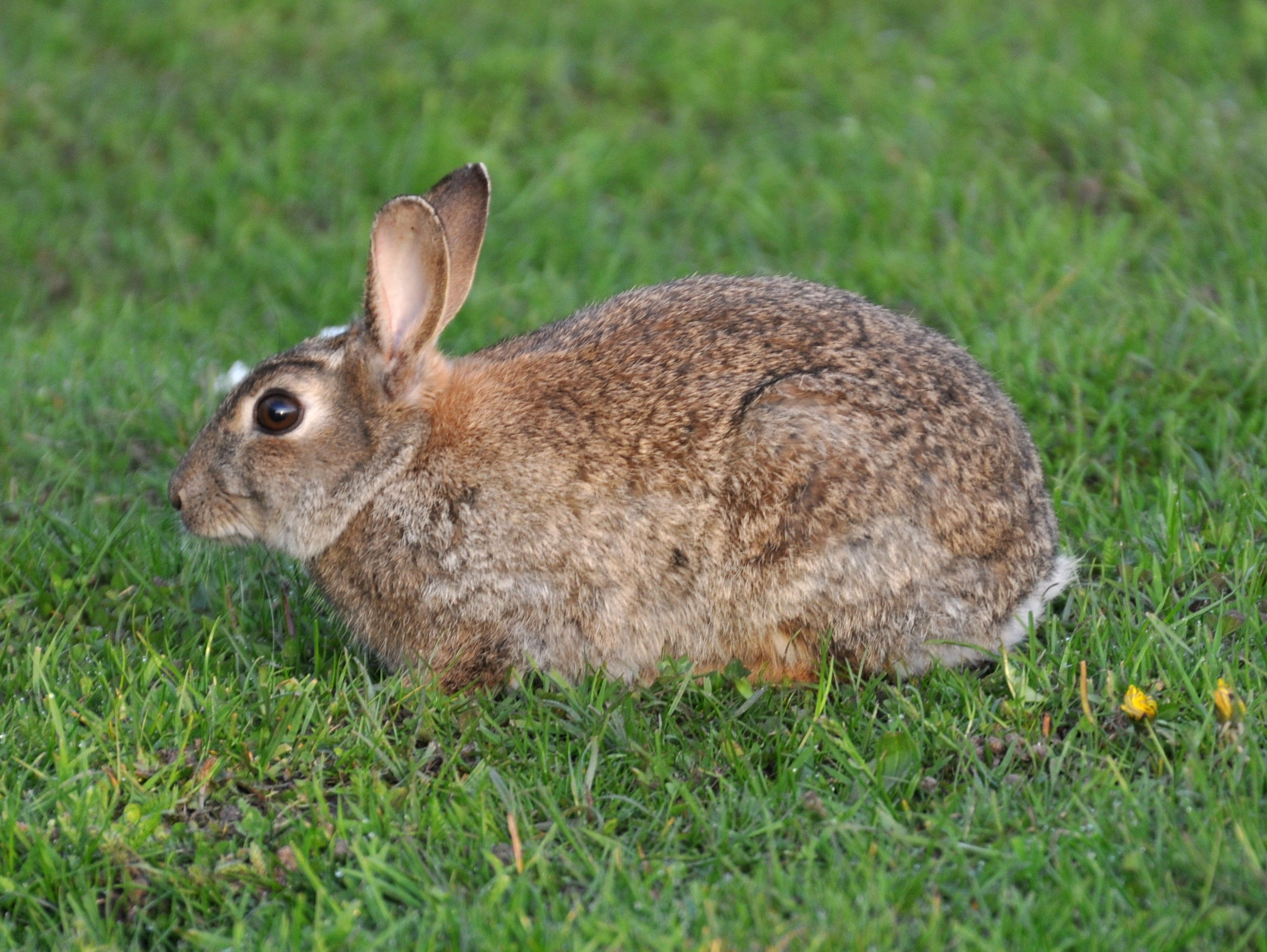
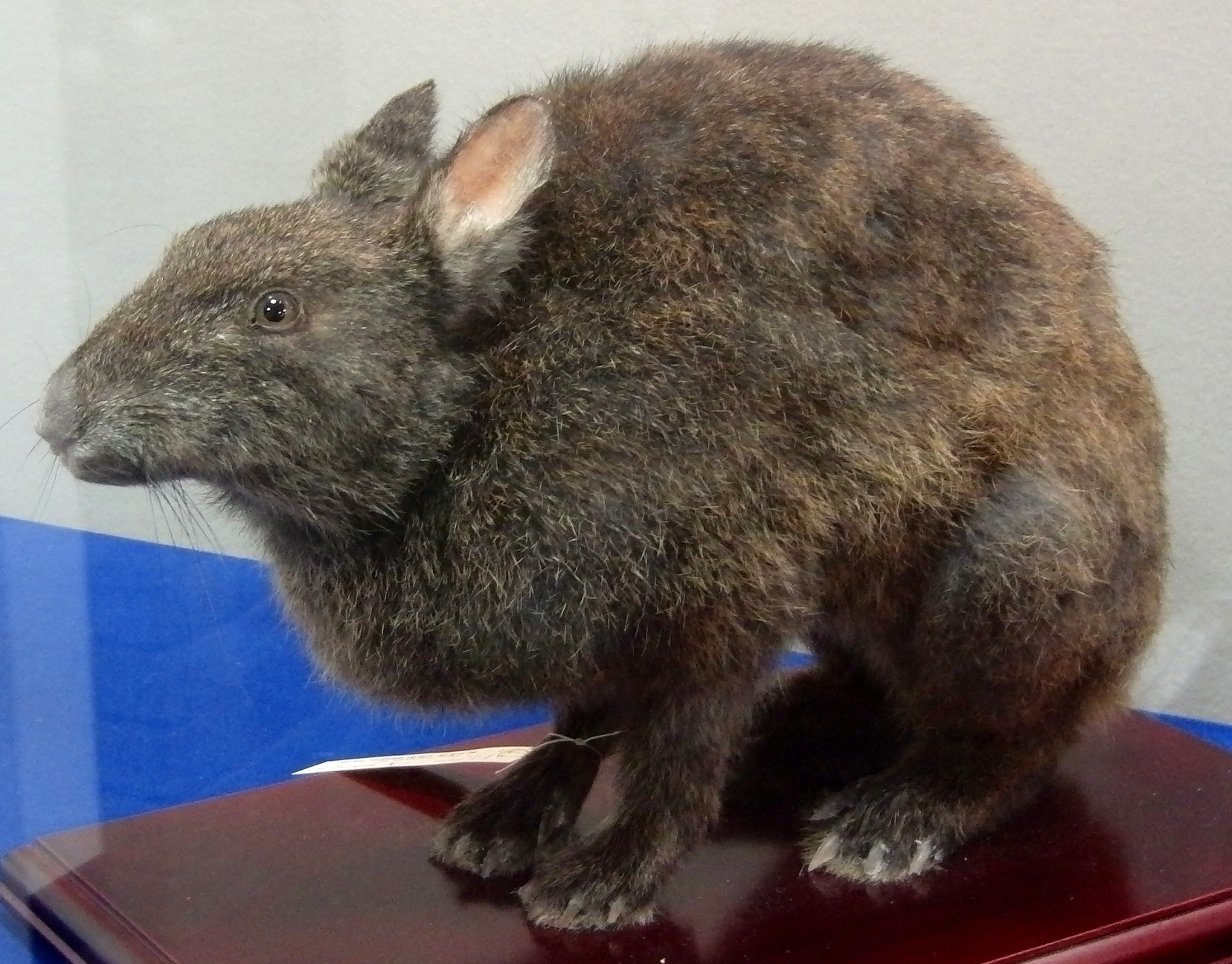
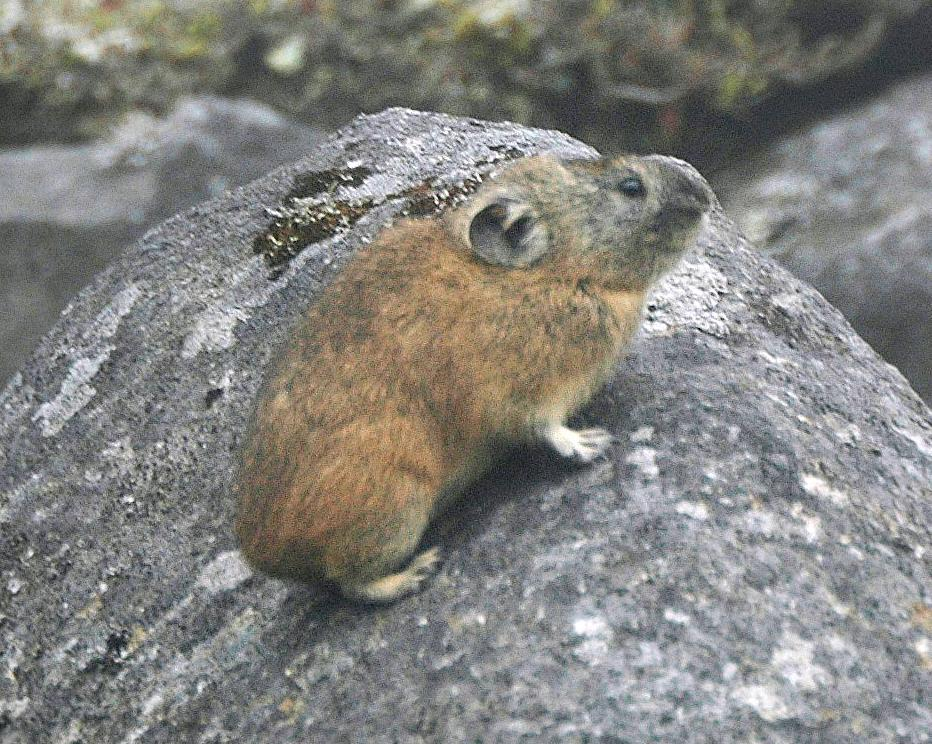
Japanese hare, Ezo mountain hare, European rabbit, Amami rabbit, Japanese pika

The lagomorphs comprise two families, Leporidae (hares and rabbits), and Ochotonidae (pikas). Though they can resemble rodents, and were classified as a superfamily in that order until the early 20th century, they have since been considered a separate order. They differ from rodents in a number of physical characteristics, such as having four incisors in the upper jaw rather than two.

- Family: Leporidae (hares and rabbits)
  - Genus: Lepus
    - Japanese hare, Lepus brachyurus LC^{IUCN} (endemic; Honshū, Shikoku, Kyūshū, and adjacent smaller islands)
      - Kyushu hare, L. b. brachyurus
      - Oki hare, L. b. okiensis
      - Sado hare, L. b. lyoni (MOE: NT) (Sado Island)
      - Tōhoku hare, L. b. angustidens
    - Mountain hare, Lepus timidus LC^{IUCN} (Hokkaidō, Kunashiri, Etorofu)
      - Ezo mountain hare, L. t. ainu (Hokkaidō)
  - Genus: Oryctolagus
    - European rabbit, Oryctolagus cuniculus EN^{IUCN} (introduced; feral on thirteen islands)
  - Genus: Pentalagus
    - Amami rabbit, Pentalagus furnessi EN^{IUCN} (MOE: EN) (endemic to Amami Ōshima and Tokunoshima; Special Natural Monument)
- Family: Ochotonidae (pikas)
  - Genus: Ochotona
    - Northern pika, Ochotona hyperborea LC^{IUCN}
      - Japanese pika, O. h. yesoensis (MOE: NT) (Hokkaidō)

== Order: Eulipotyphla (hedgehogs, shrews, and moles) ==
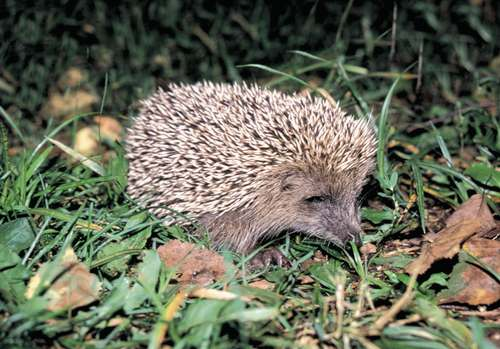
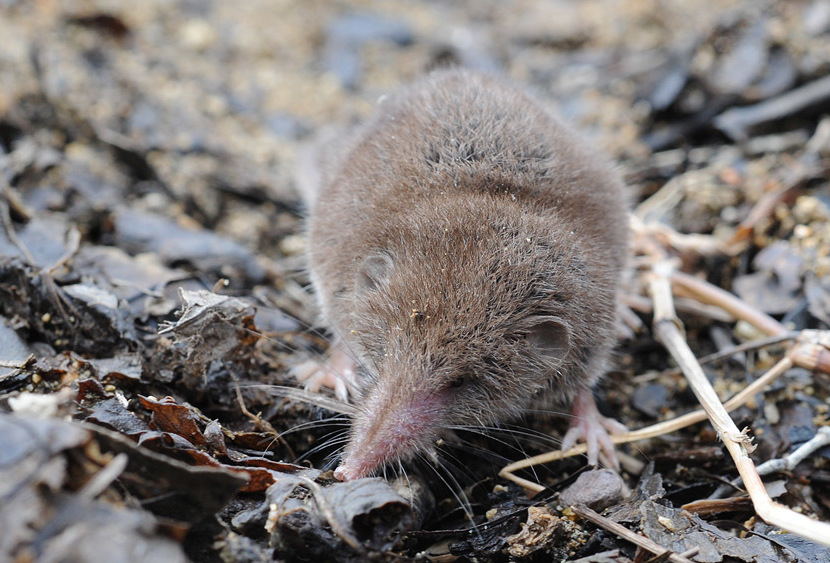
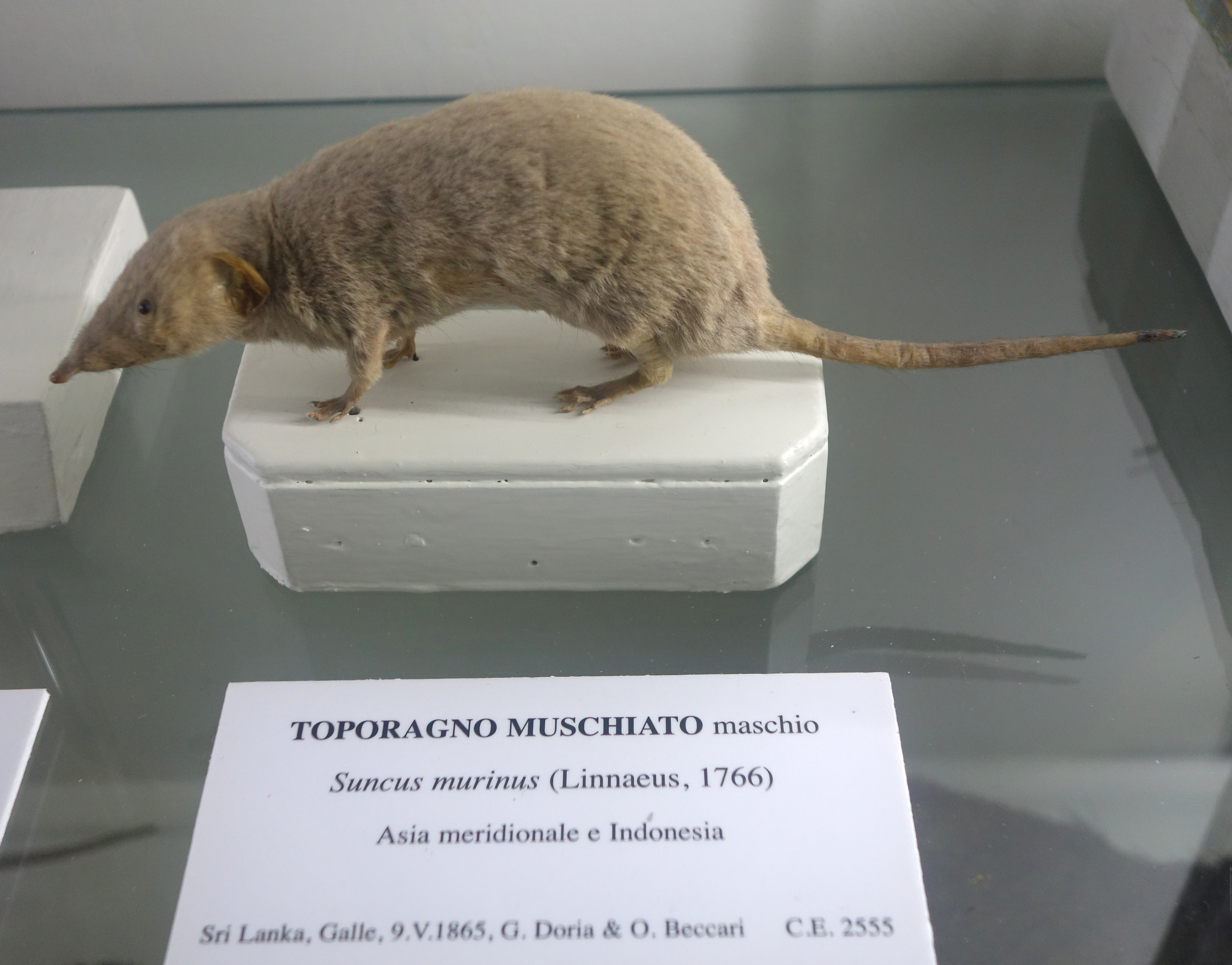
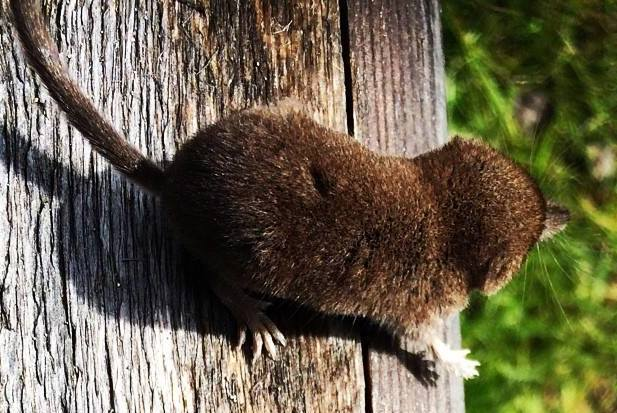
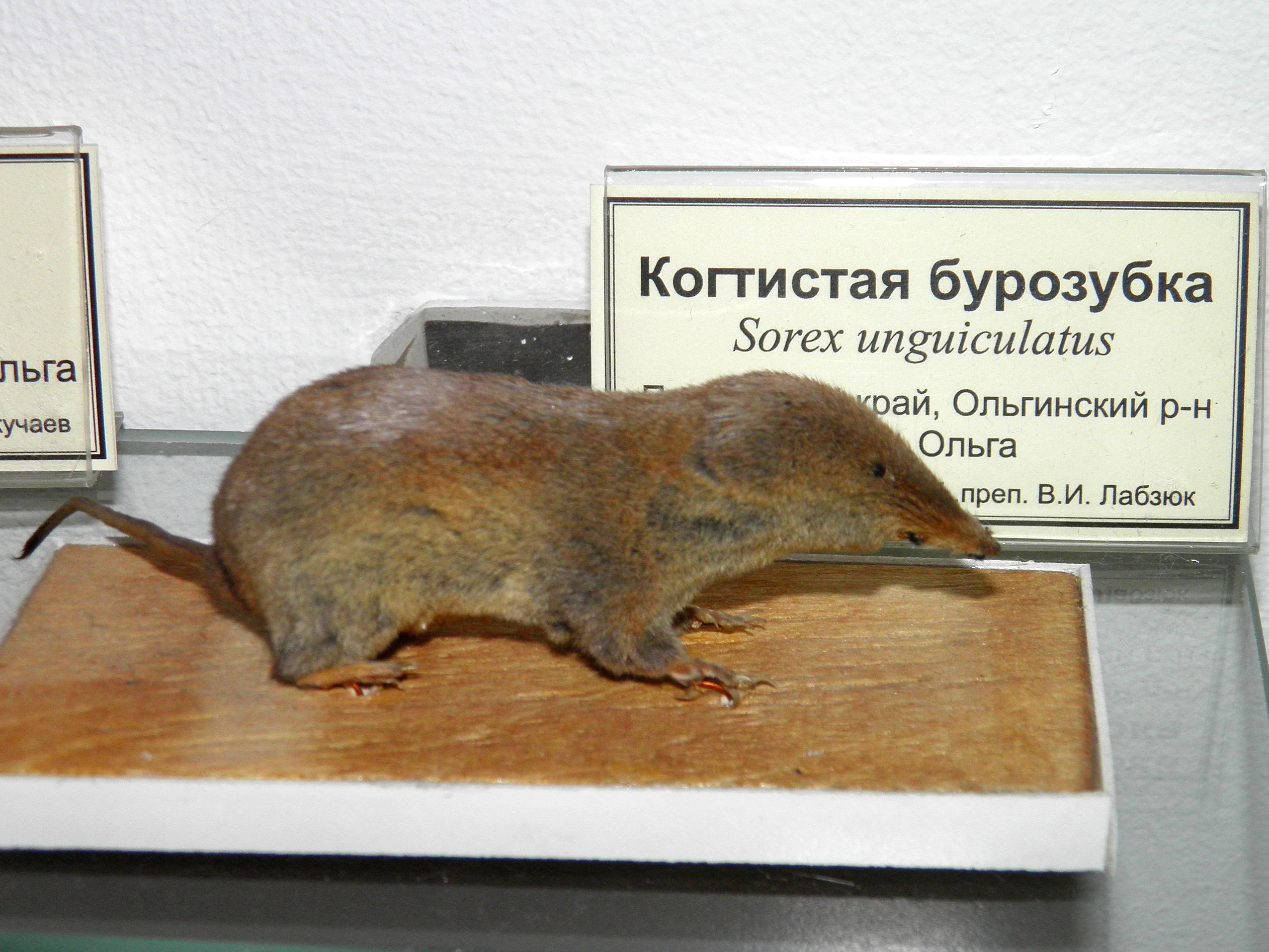
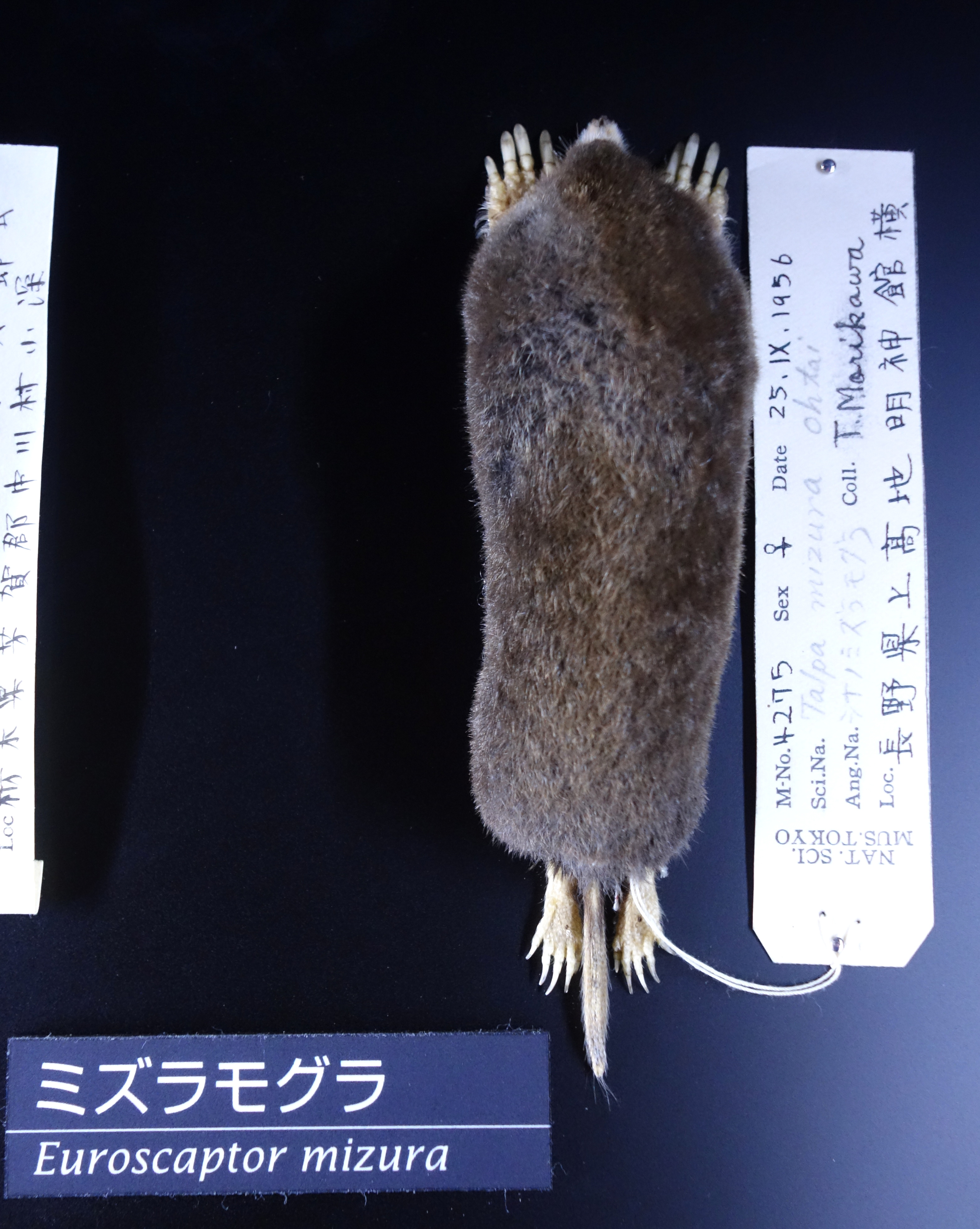
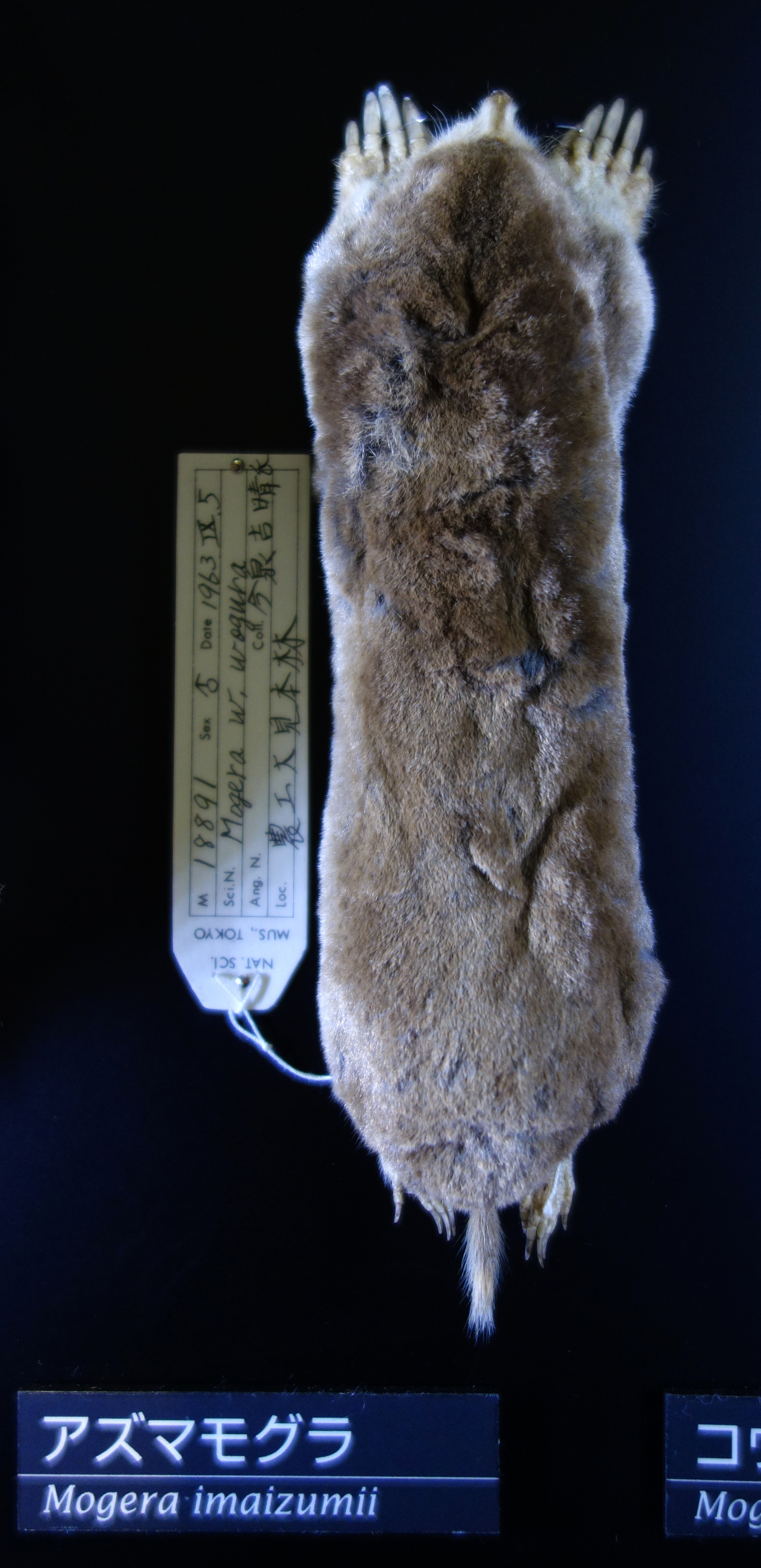
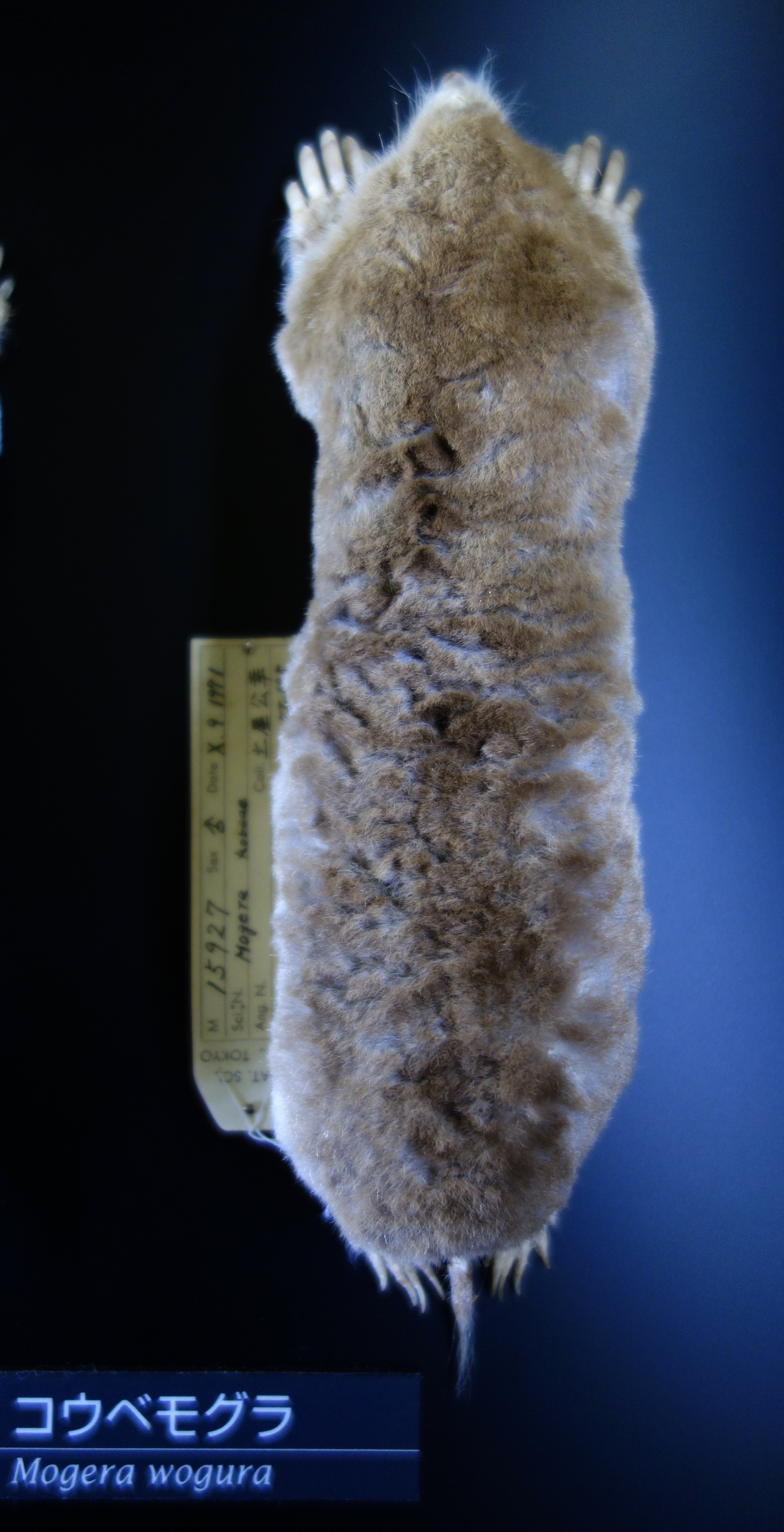
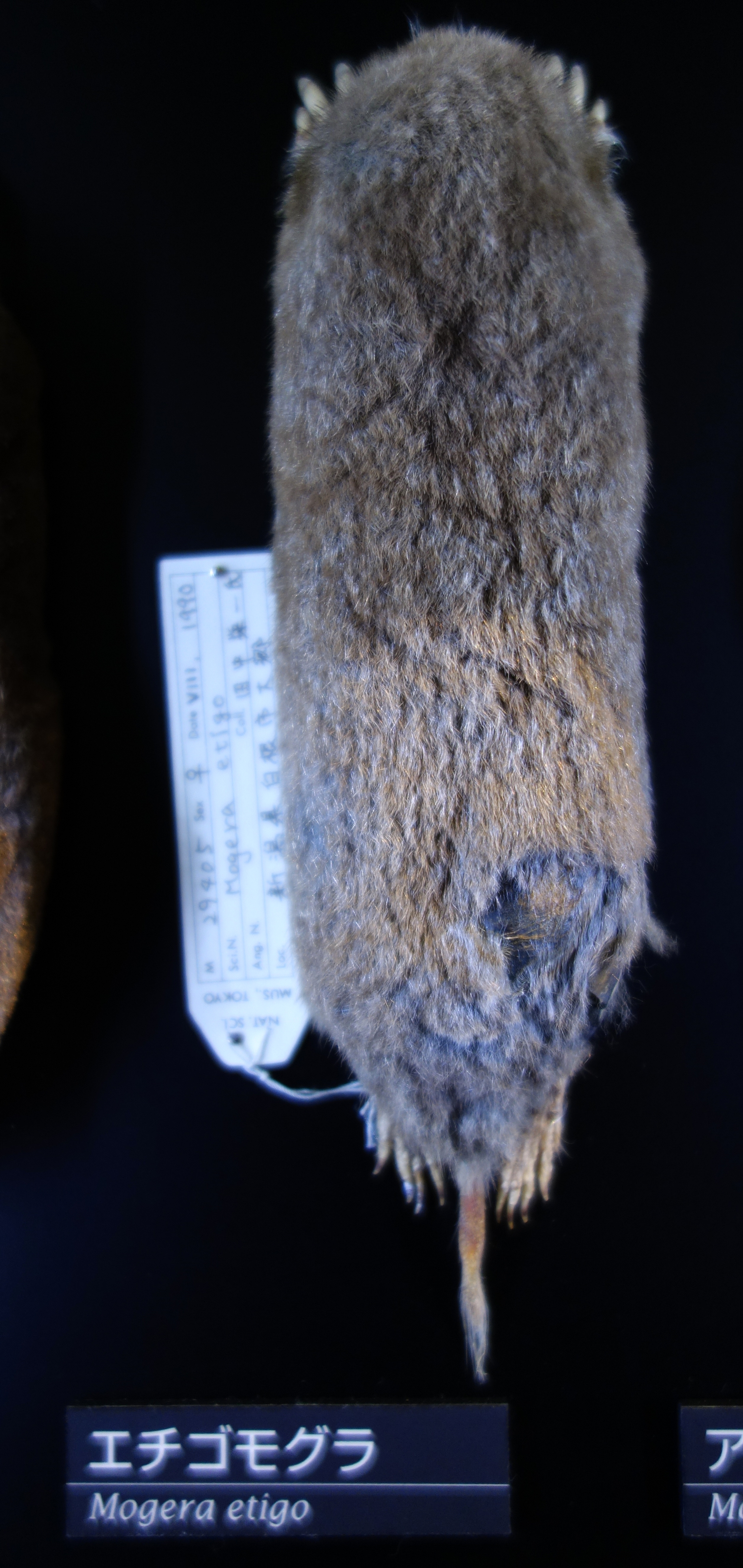
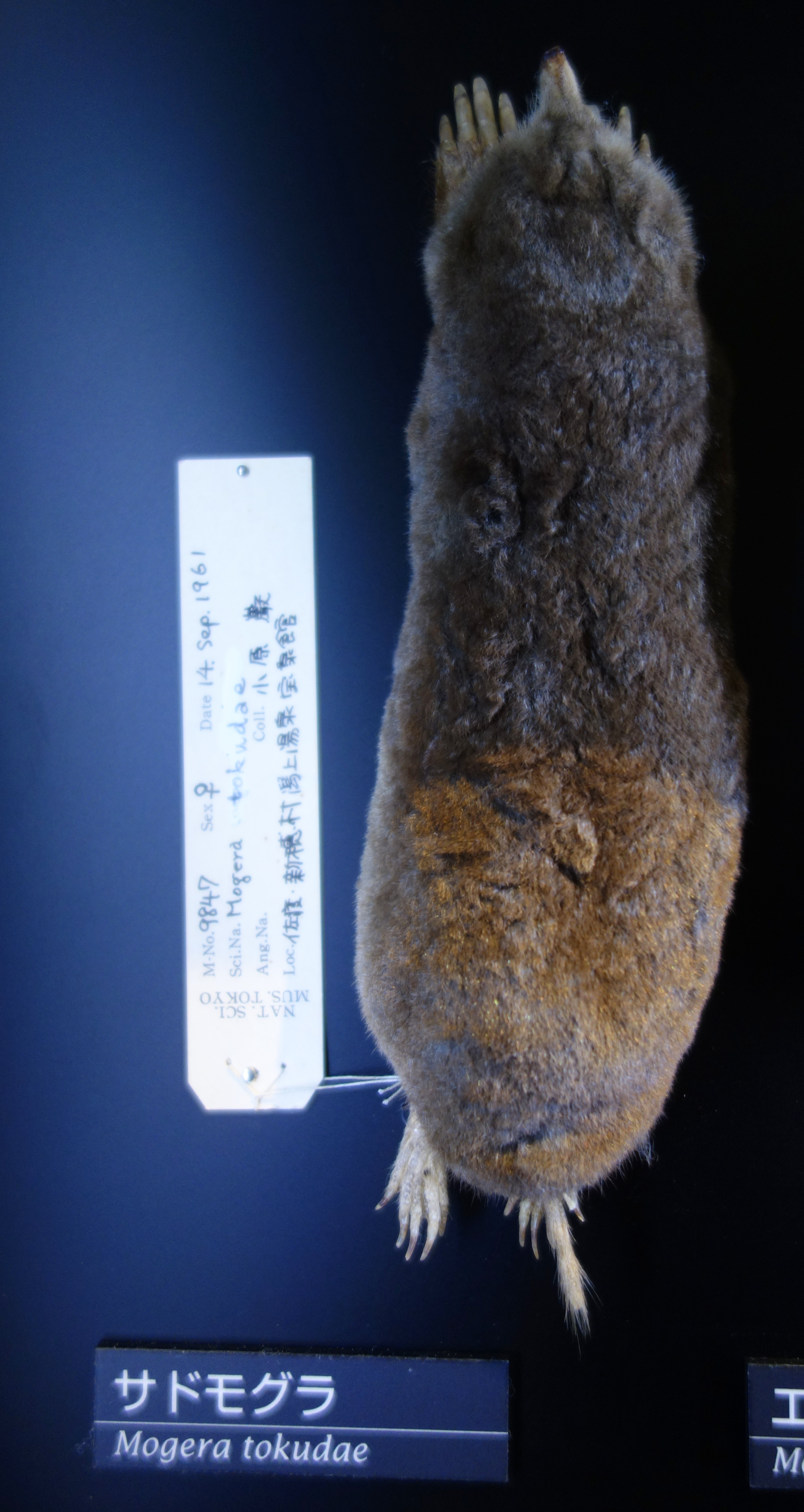
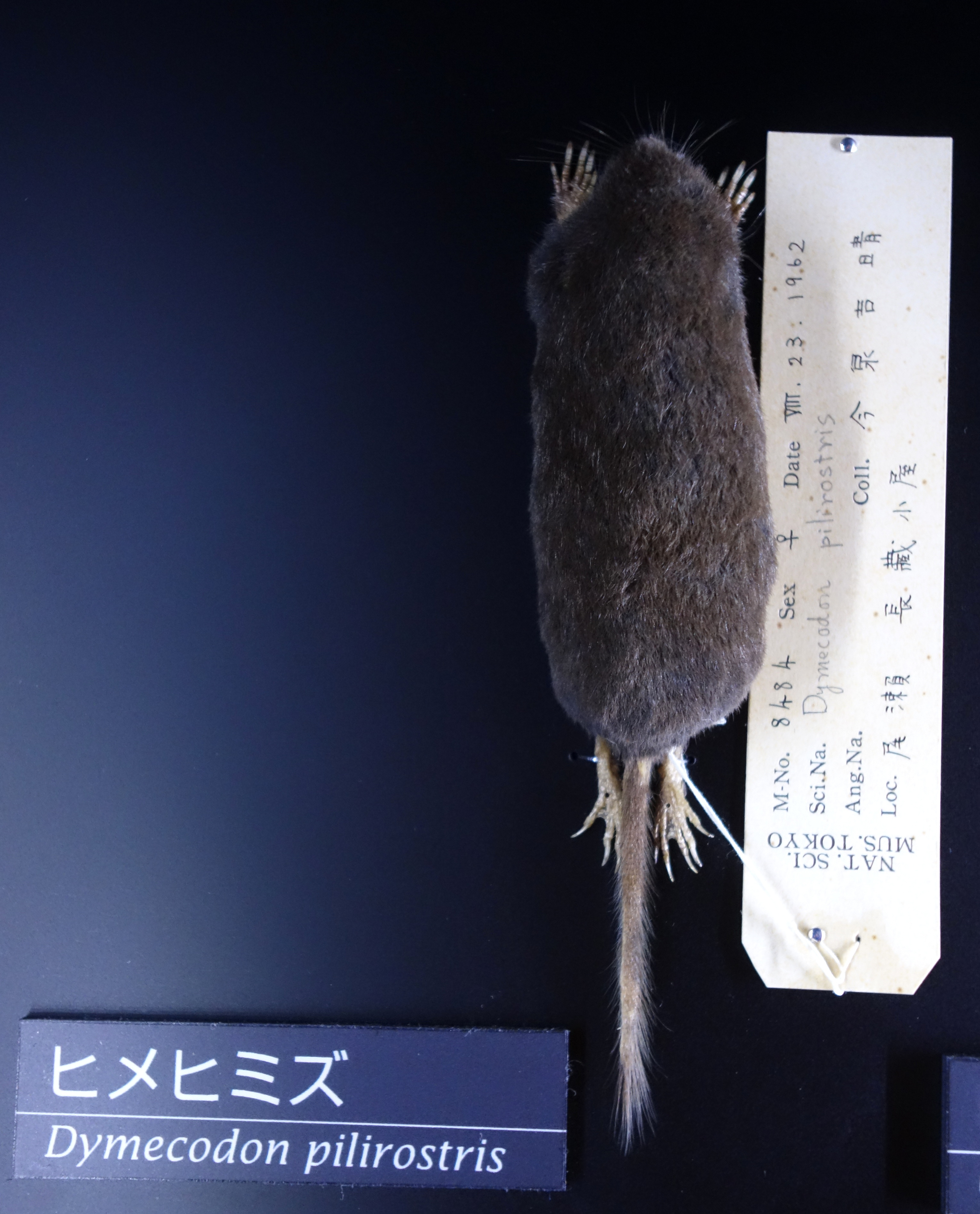
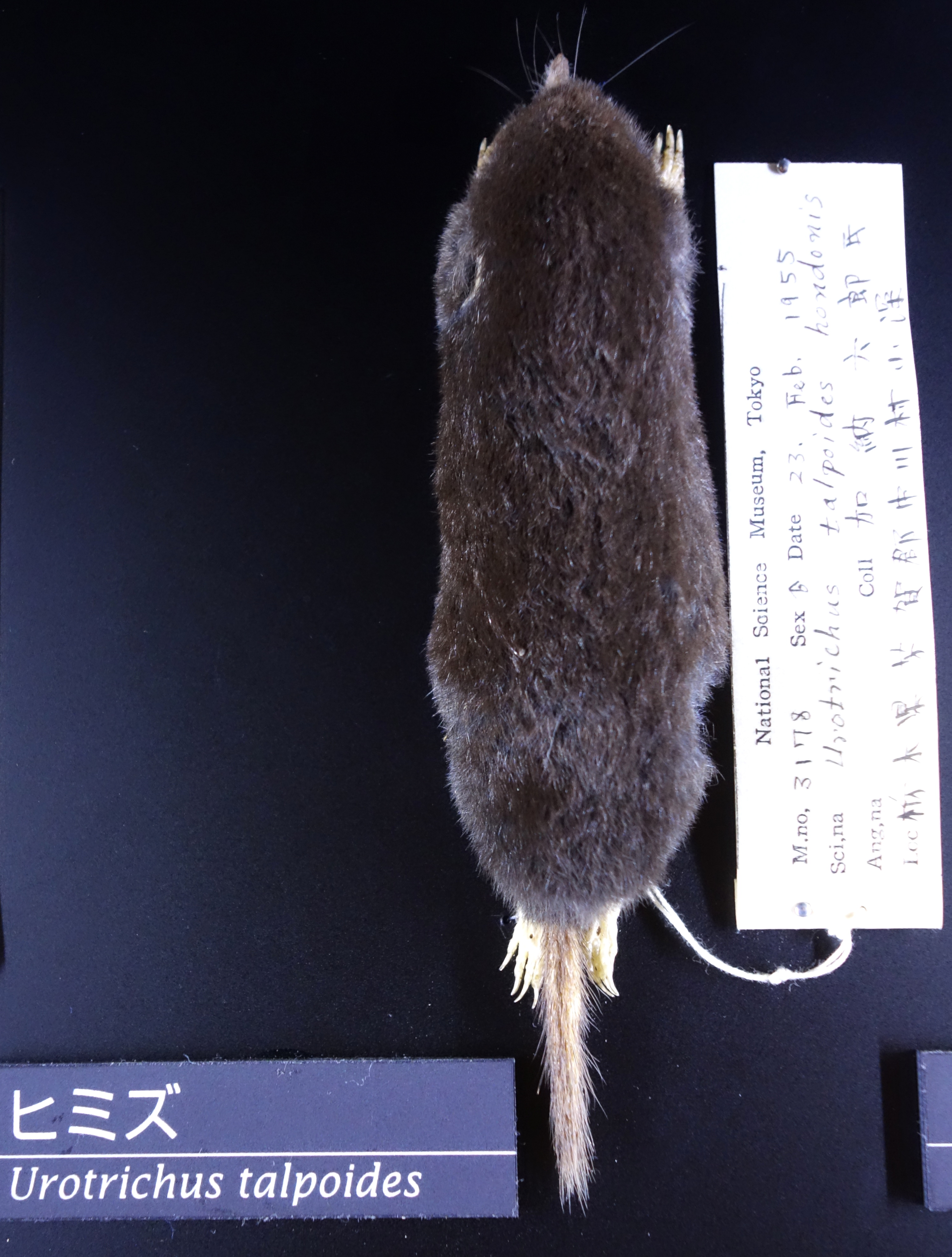
Amur hedgehog, Asian lesser white-toothed shrew, house shrew, Laxmann's shrew, long-clawed shrew, Japanese mountain mole, small Japanese mole, Japanese mole, Echigo mole, Sado mole, True's shrew mole, Japanese shrew mole

Eulipotyphlans are insectivorous mammals. Shrews and solenodons resemble mice, hedgehogs carry spines, gymnures look more like large rats, while moles are stout-bodied burrowers.

- Family: Erinaceidae (hedgehogs and moonrats)
  - Subfamily: Erinaceinae
    - Genus: Erinaceus
      - Amur hedgehog, Erinaceus amurensis LC^{IUCN} (introduced; populations in the Odawara area and on the Izu Peninsula)
- Family: Soricidae (shrews)
  - Subfamily: Crocidurinae
    - Genus: Crocidura
      - Asian lesser white-toothed shrew, Crocidura shantungensis LC^{IUCN} (MOE: NT) (Tsushima Island)
      - Watase's shrew, Crocidura watasei LC^{IUCN} (MOE: NT) (endemic to the Ryūkyū Islands)
      - Dsinezumi shrew, Crocidura dsinezumi LC^{IUCN} (from Hokkaidō to Kagoshima; also Jeju Island)
        - C. d. chisai
        - C. d. dsinezumi
        - C. d. intermedia
        - C. d. okinoshimae
        - C. d. umbrina
      - Orii's shrew, Crocidura orii EN^{IUCN} (MOE: EN) (endemic to the Amami Islands)
    - Genus: Suncus
      - House shrew, Suncus murinus LC^{IUCN} (Ryūkyū Islands, Fukue Island, Kyūshū (Nagasaki, Kagoshima))
        - S. m. temmincki
  - Subfamily: Soricinae
    - Tribe: Nectogalini
      - Genus: Chimarrogale
        - Japanese water shrew, Chimarrogale platycephalus LC^{IUCN} (endemic; Honshū and Kyūshū)
    - Tribe: Soricini
      - Genus: Sorex
        - Slender shrew, Sorex gracillimus LC^{IUCN} (Hokkaidō and adjacent smaller islands)
        - Azumi shrew, Sorex hosonoi LC^{IUCN} (MOE: NT) (endemic; central Honshū)
        - Eurasian least shrew, Sorex minutissimus LC^{IUCN}
          - Ezo least shrew, S. m. hawkeri (MOE: VU) (Hokkaidō, Kenbokki Island, Kunashiri)
        - Shinto shrew, Sorex shinto LC^{IUCN} (endemic; subspecies on Honshū, Sado Island, and Shikoku)
          - Sado shrew, S. s. sadonis
          - Shikoku shrew, S. s. shikokensis (MOE: NT) (Shikoku)
          - S. s. shinto
        - Laxmann's shrew, Sorex caecutiens LC^{IUCN} (Hokkaidō, Kunashiri)
          - S. c. saevus
        - Long-clawed shrew, Sorex unguiculatus LC^{IUCN} (Hokkaidō and adjacent smaller islands)
- Family: Talpidae (moles)
  - Subfamily: Talpinae
    - Tribe: Talpini
      - Genus: Euroscaptor
        - Japanese mountain mole, Euroscaptor mizura LC^{IUCN} (MOE: NT) (endemic; Honshū)
      - Genus: Mogera
        - Small Japanese mole, Mogera imaizumii LC^{IUCN} (endemic; Honshū, Shikoku, and adjacent smaller islands)
        - Japanese mole, Mogera wogura LC^{IUCN} (endemic; southern Honshū, Shikoku, Kyūshū, and adjacent smaller islands)
        - Echigo mole, Mogera etigo EN^{IUCN} (MOE: EN) (endemic; Niigata)
        - Sado mole, Mogera tokudae NT^{IUCN} (MOE: NT) (endemic to Sado Island)
        - Senkaku mole, Mogera uchidai VU^{IUCN} (MOE: CR) (endemic to Uotsuri Island)
    - Tribe: Urotrichini
      - Genus: Urotrichus
        - True's shrew mole, Dymecodon pilirostris LC^{IUCN} (endemic; Honshū, Shikoku, Kyūshū)
        - Japanese shrew mole, Urotrichus talpoides LC^{IUCN} (endemic; Honshū, Shikoku, Kyūshū, and adjacent smaller islands)

== Order: Chiroptera (bats) ==
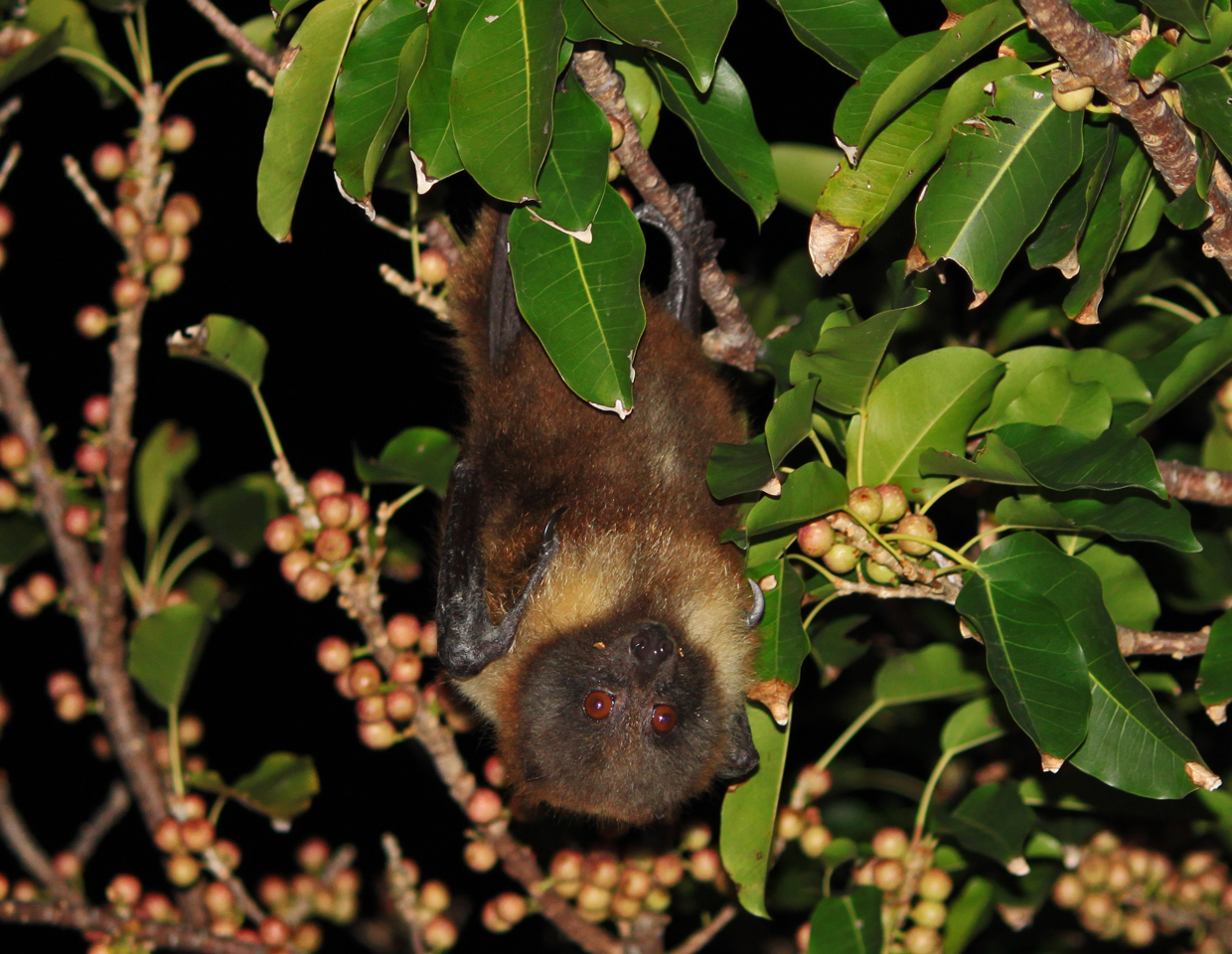
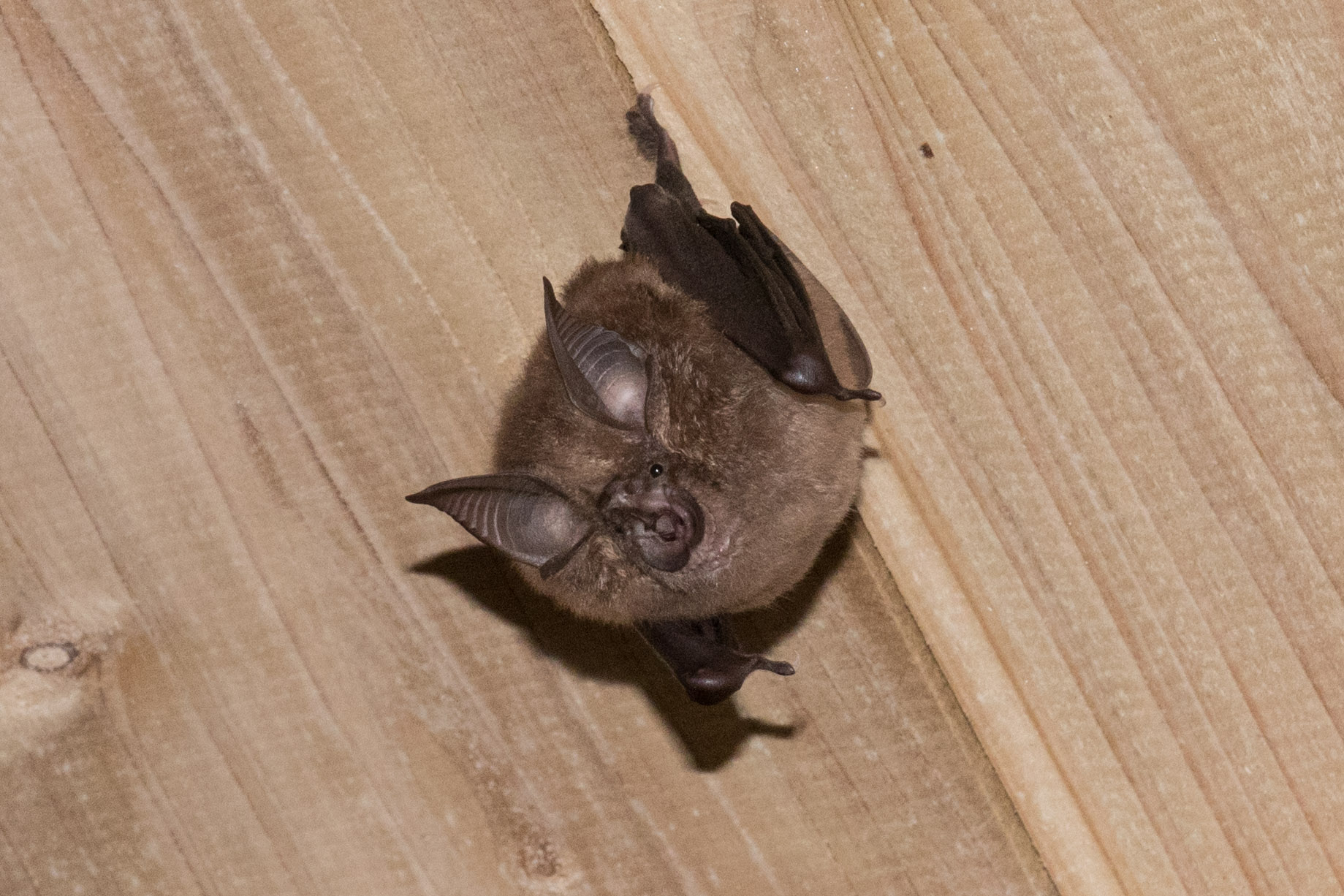
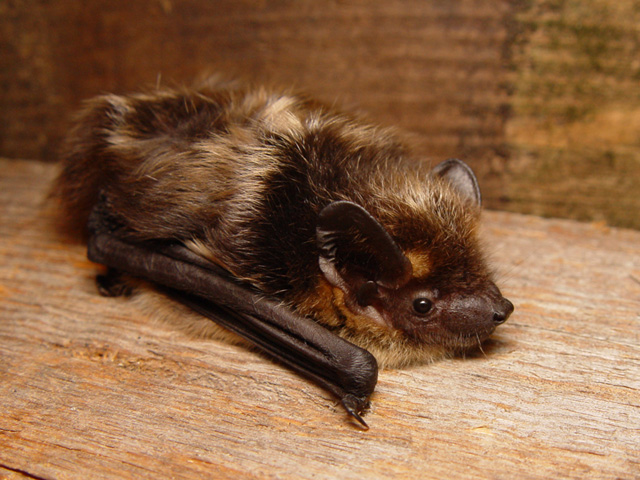
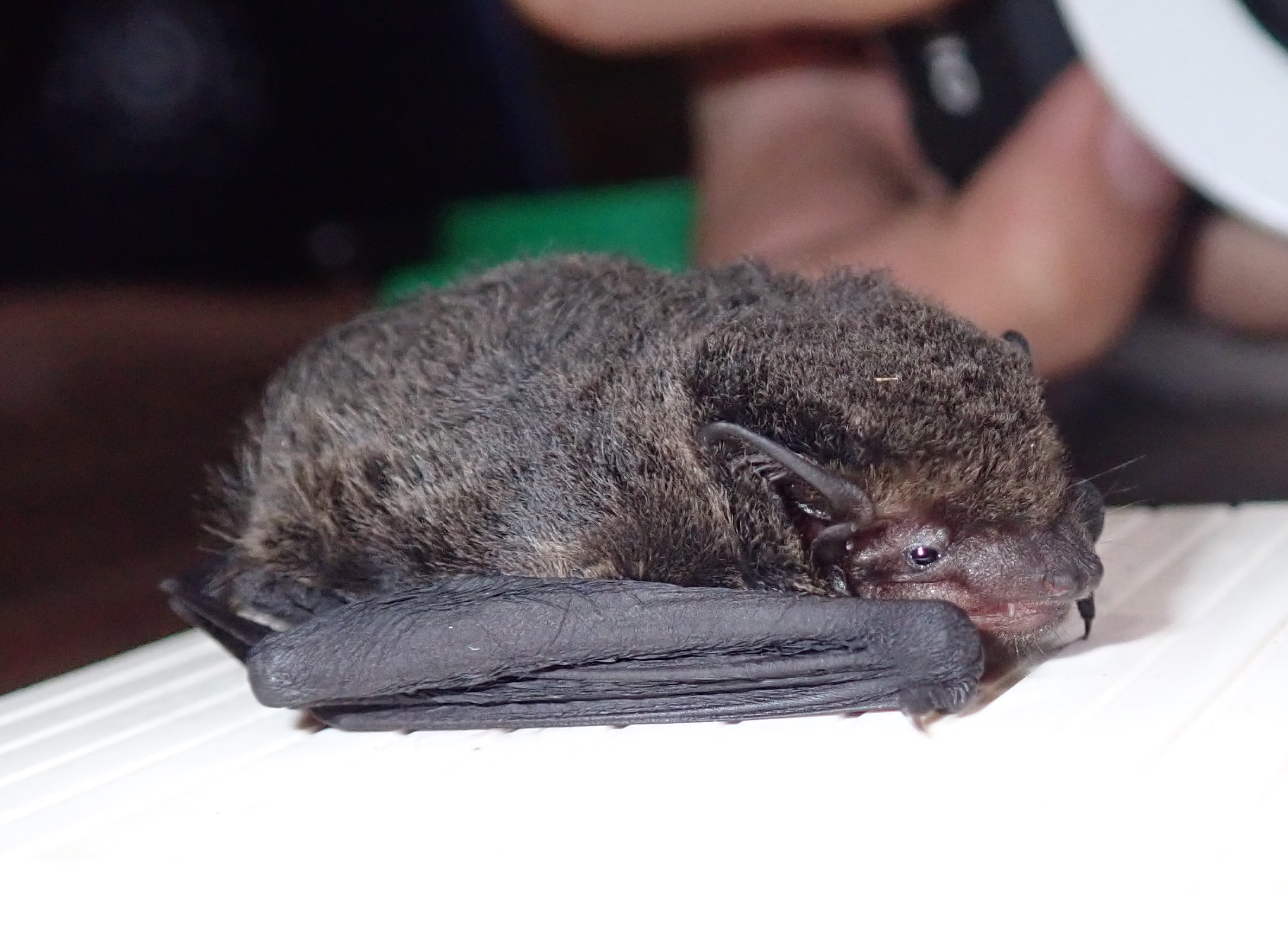
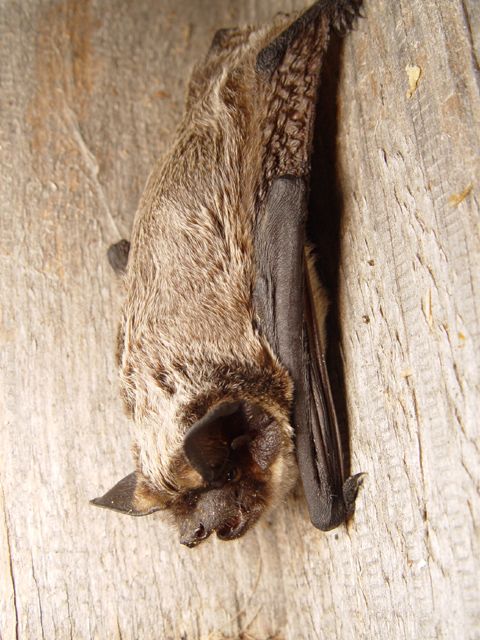
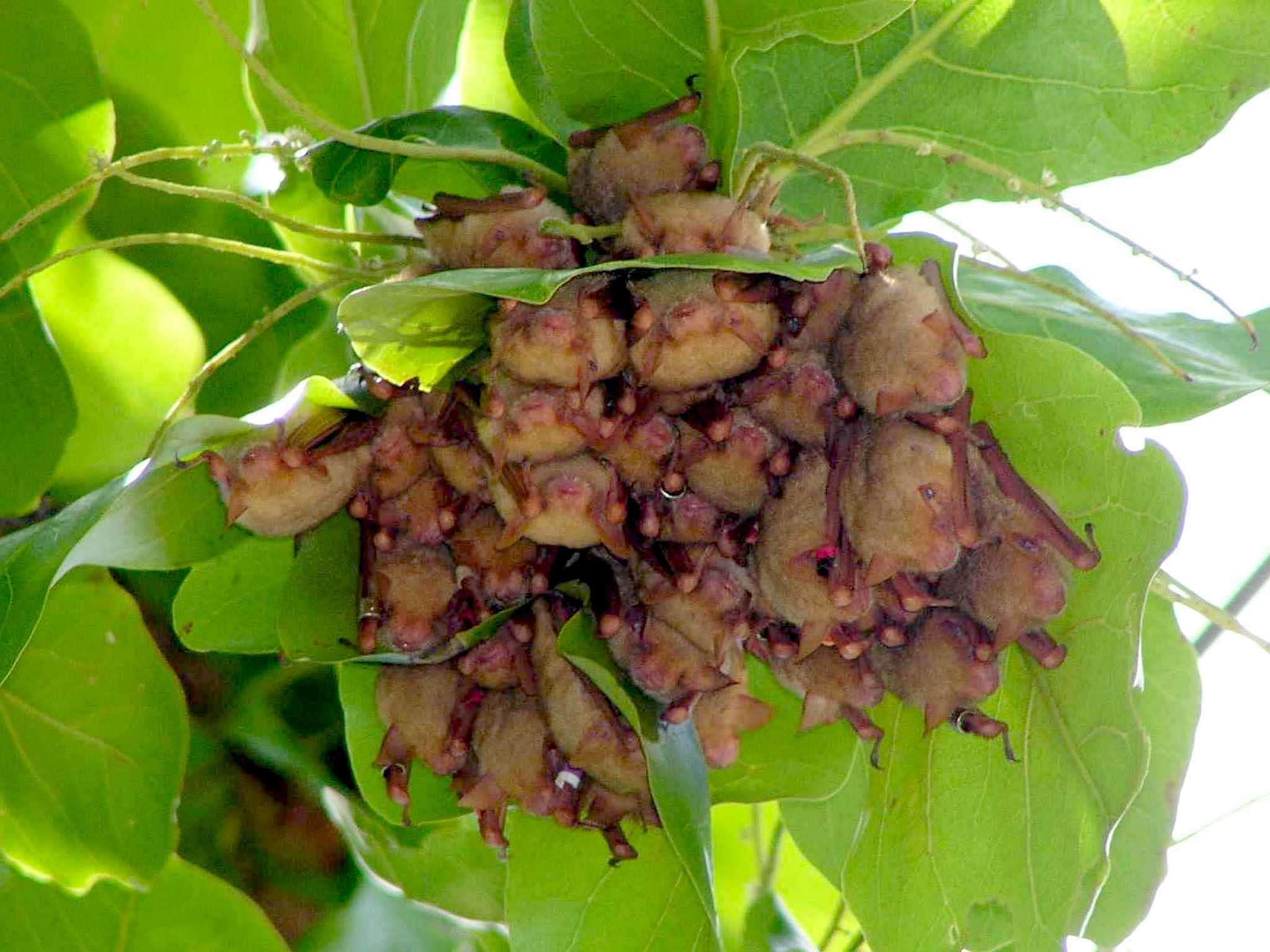
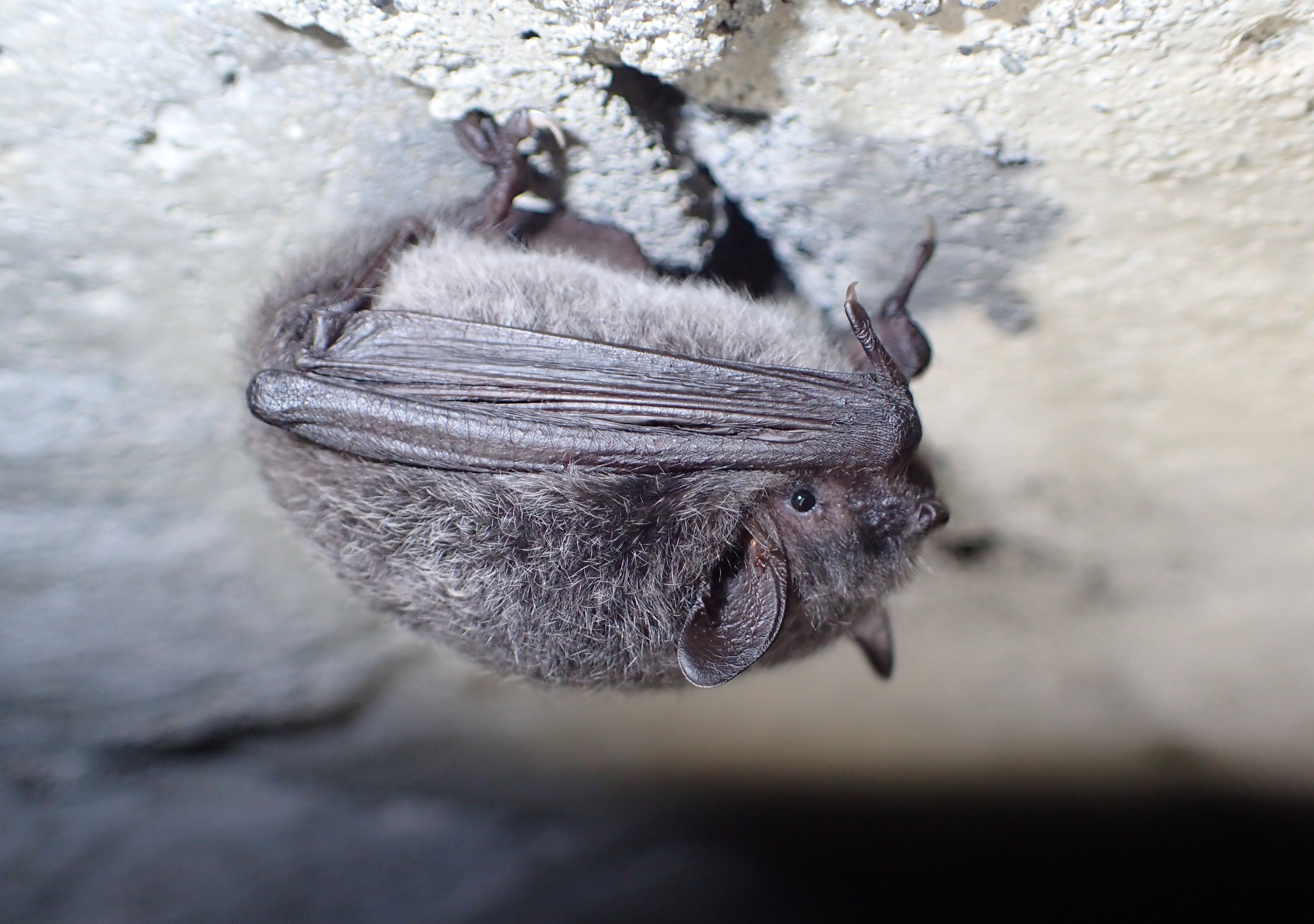
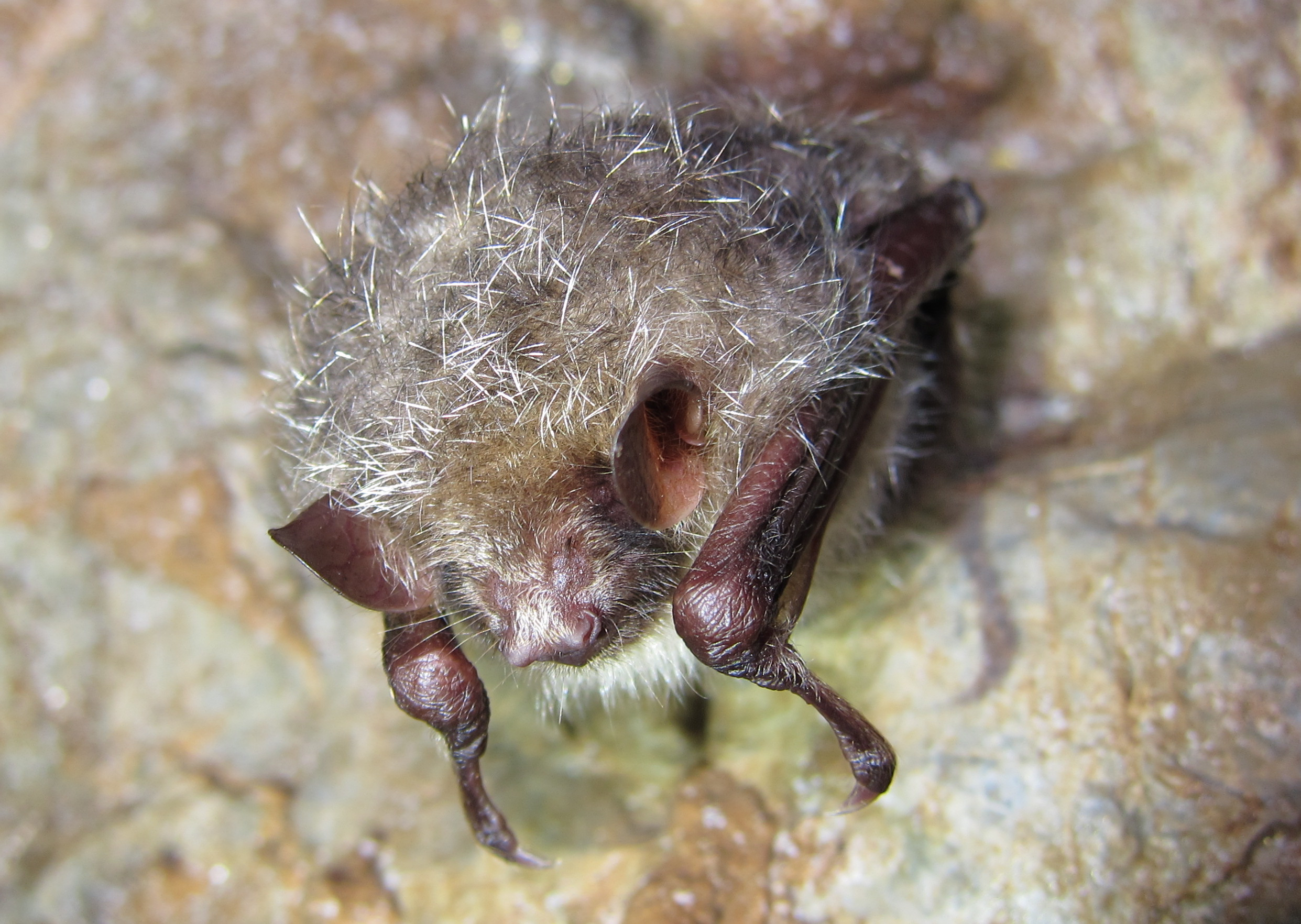
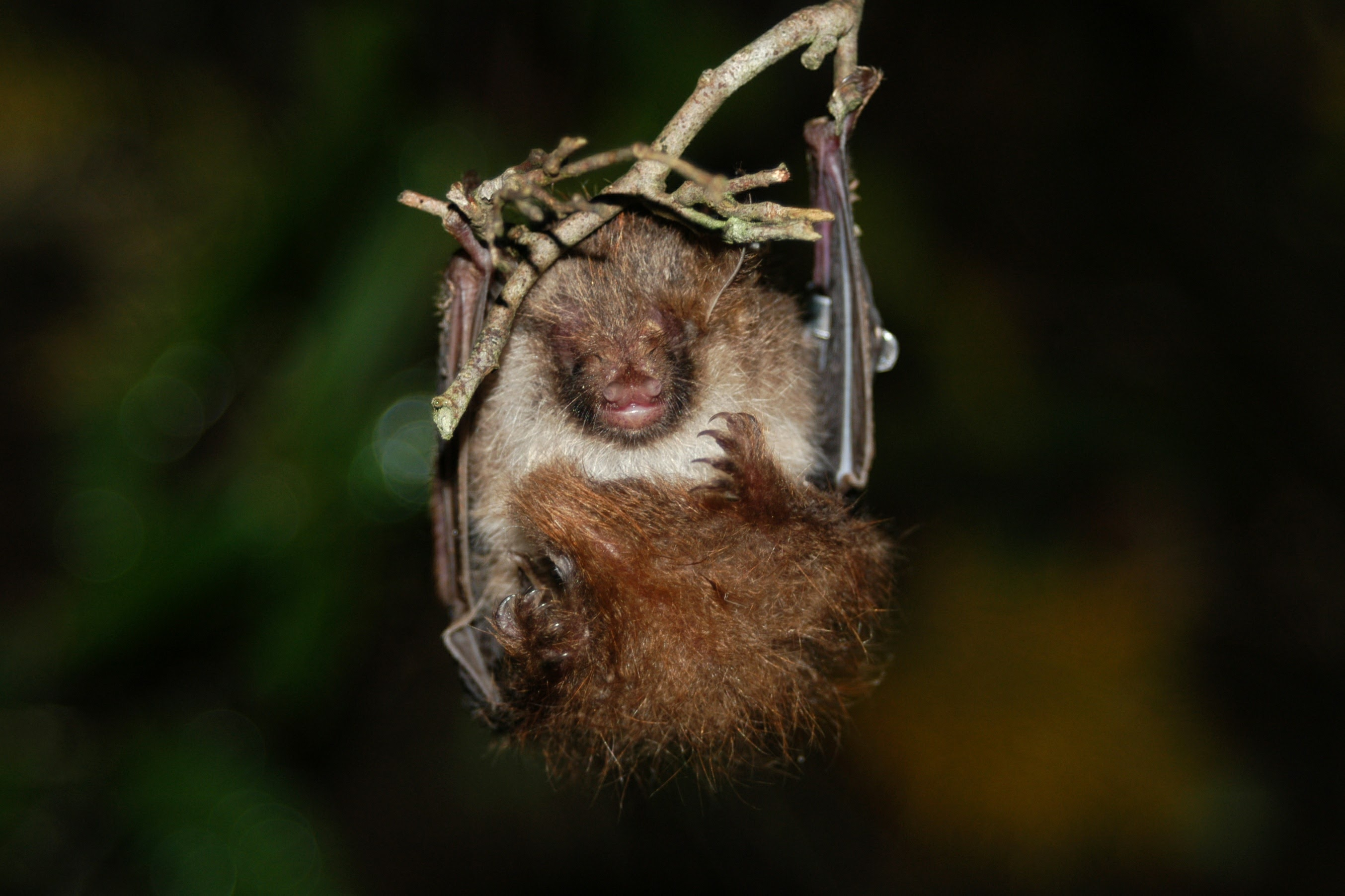
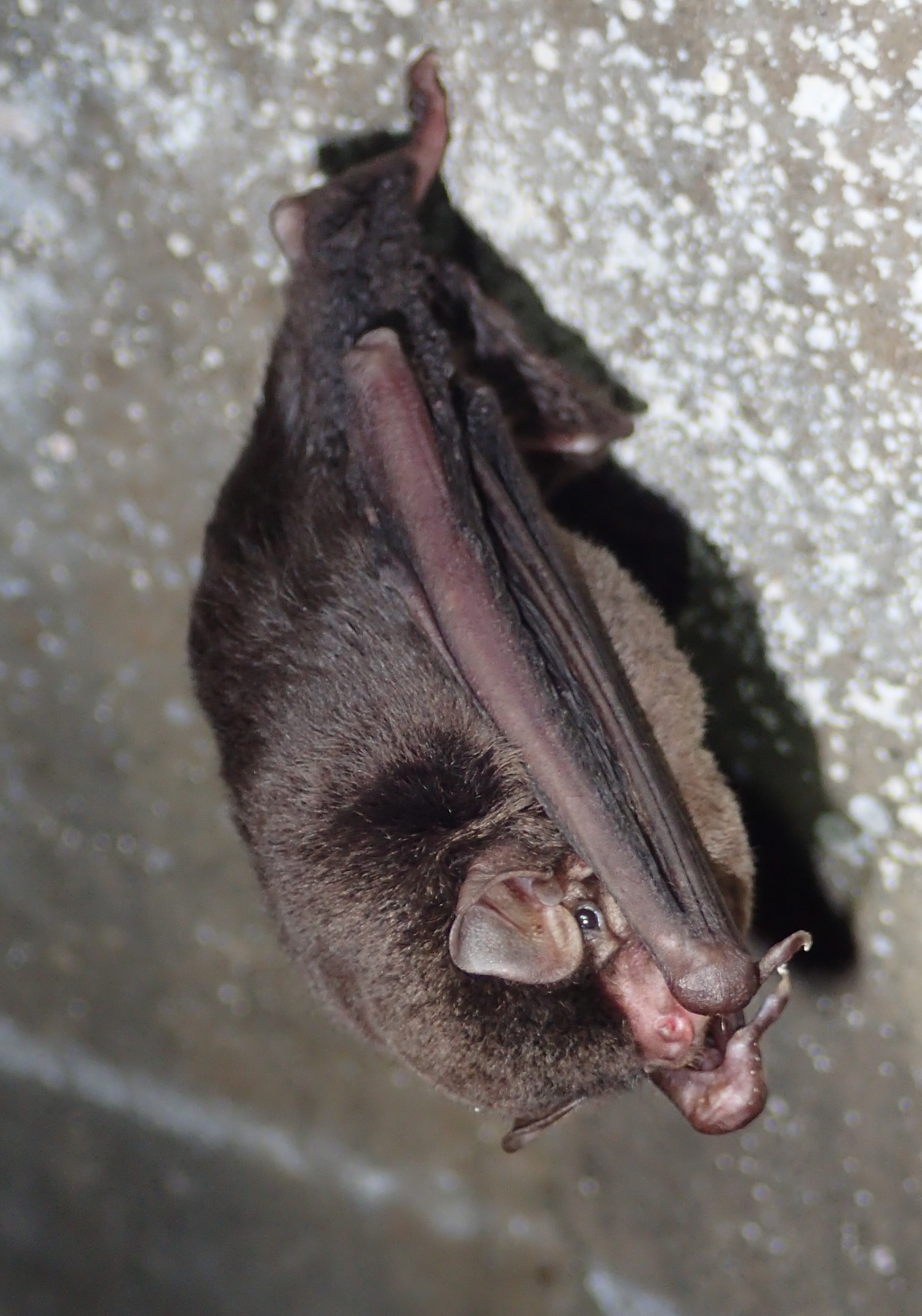
Ryukyu flying fox, little Japanese horseshoe bat, northern bat, Endo's pipistrelle, parti-coloured bat, Hodgson's bat, big-footed myotis, Hilgendorf's tube-nosed bat, Ussuri tube-nosed bat, eastern bent-wing bat

The bats' most distinguishing feature is that their forelimbs are developed as wings, making them the only mammals capable of flight. Bat species account for about 20% of all mammals.

- Family: Pteropodidae (flying foxes, Old World fruit bats)
  - Subfamily: Pteropodinae
    - Genus: Pteropus
      - Ryukyu flying fox, Pteropus dasymallus VU^{IUCN} (Ryūkyū Islands)
        - Daito flying fox, P. d. daitoensis (MOE: CR) (Daitō Islands; Natural Monument)
        - Erabu flying fox, P. d. dasymallus (MOE: CR) (Ōsumi Islands and Tokara Islands)
        - Orii's flying fox, P. d. inopinatus
        - Yaeyama flying fox, P. d. yayeyamae
      - Okinawa flying fox, Pteropus loochoensis DD^{IUCN} (MOE: EX) (not found since a C19 record)
      - Bonin flying fox, Pteropus pselaphon EN^{IUCN} (MOE: EN) (endemic to Bonin Islands and Volcano Islands)
- Family: Hipposideridae
  - Genus: Hipposideros
    - Lesser great leaf-nosed bat, Hipposideros turpis EN^{IUCN} (endemic to Yaeyama Islands)
- Family: Rhinolophidae
  - Genus: Rhinolophus
    - Greater horseshoe bat, Rhinolophus ferrumequinum LC^{IUCN} (widely distributed)
    - Imaizumi's horseshoe bat Rhinolophus imaizumii (endemic)
    - Little Japanese horseshoe bat, Rhinolophus cornutus (NR) (endemic; widely distributed)
      - R. c. cornutus
      - Orii's least horseshoe bat, R. c. orii (MOE: EN) (Amami Islands)
    - Okinawa little horseshoe bat, Rhinolophus pumilus (NR) (endemic to Okinawa)
      - Okinawa little horseshoe bat, R. p. pumilus (MOE: EN) (Okinawa)
      - Miyako little horseshoe bat, R. p. miyakonis (MOE: EX) (Miyako Island)
    - Yaeyama little horseshoe bat, Rhinolophus perditus EN^{IUCN} (MOE: VU) (endemic to the Yaeyama Islands)
- Family: Molossidae
  - Genus: Tadarida
    - East Asian free-tailed bat, Tadarida insignis DD^{IUCN} (MOE: VU) (not found in Okinawa)
    - La Touche's free-tailed bat, Tadarida latouchei EN^{IUCN} (MOE: DD) (Amami Islands, Kuchinoerabu-jima)
- Family: Miniopteridae
  - Genus: Miniopterus
    - Eastern bent-wing bat, Miniopterus fuliginosus (NR) (Honshū, Shikoku, Kyūshū, and adjacent smaller islands)
    - Southeast Asian long-fingered bat, Miniopterus fuscus EN^{IUCN} (MOE: EN) (endemic to Ryūkyū Islands)
- Family: Vespertilionidae
  - Subfamily: Vespertilioninae
    - Genus: Eptesicus
      - Japanese short-tailed bat, Eptesicus japonensis VU^{IUCN} (MOE: VU) (endemic; central Honshū)
      - Northern bat, Eptesicus nilssoni LC^{IUCN} (Hokkaidō, Kunashiri, Etorofu)
    - Genus: Nyctalus
      - Birdlike noctule, Nyctalus aviator NT^{IUCN} (MOE: VU) (widely distributed)
      - Japanese noctule, Nyctalus furvus EN^{IUCN} (MOE: EN) (endemic; central and northern Honshū)
    - Genus: Pipistrellus
      - Japanese pipistrelle, Pipistrellus abramus LC^{IUCN} (widely distributed)
      - Endo's pipistrelle, Pipistrellus endoi NT^{IUCN} (MOE: VU) (endemic; Honshū and Shikoku)
      - Sturdee's pipistrelle, Pipistrellus sturdeei EX^{IUCN} (MOE: EX) (endemic; not found since the type specimen was collected on Hahajima in 1915)
    - Genus: Barbastella
      - Asian barbastelle, Barbastella leucomelas LC^{IUCN}
        - Eastern barbastelle, B. l. darielingensis (Hokkaidō, Kunashiri, Honshū and Shikoku)
    - Genus: Plecotus
      - Japanese long-eared bat, Plecotus sacrimontis LC^{IUCN} (endemic; not found in Okinawa)
    - Genus: Hypsugo
      - Alashanian pipistrelle, Hypsugo alaschanicus LC^{IUCN} (MOE: DD) (found in Hokkaidō and Aomori, and on Tsushima Island)
      - Savi's pipistrelle, Hypsugo savii LC^{IUCN}
    - Genus: Vespertilio
      - Particoloured bat, Vespertilio murinus LC^{IUCN} (MOE: DD) (found in Hokkaidō, Aomori, and Ishikawa)
      - Asian particoloured bat, Vespertilio sinensis LC^{IUCN} (widely distributed; not found in Okinawa)
  - Subfamily: Myotinae
    - Genus: Myotis
      - Reddish-black myotis, Myotis rufoniger LC^{IUCN} (MOE: CR) (as Hodgson's bat, Myotis formosus) (found on Tsushima)
      - Fraternal myotis, Myotis frater DD^{IUCN} (north from Gifu)
      - Ussuri whiskered bat, Myotis gracilis LC^{IUCN} (as Siberian bat Myotis sibiricus) (MOE: VU) (Hokkaidō, Kunashiri, Etorofu)
      - Ikonnikov's bat, Myotis ikonnikovi LC^{IUCN} (Hokkaidō, Kunashiri, Honshū)
        - M. i. hosonoi
        - M. i. ikonnikovi
      - Big-footed myotis, Myotis macrodactylus LC^{IUCN} (widely distributed)
      - Far Eastern myotis, Myotis bombinus NT^{IUCN} (MOE: VU) (as Myotis nattereri bombinus) (widely distributed; not found in Okinawa)
      - Eastern water bat, Myotis petax LC^{IUCN} (Hokkaidō, Kunashiri, Etorofu)
      - Frosted myotis, Myotis pruinosus EN^{IUCN} (MOE: VU) (endemic; Honshū, Shikoku, Kyūshū)
      - Yanbaru whiskered bat, Myotis yanbarensis CR^{IUCN} (MOE: CR) (endemic to Ryūkyū Islands)
  - Subfamily: Murininae
    - Genus: Murina
      - Hilgendorf's tube-nosed bat, Murina hilgendorfi LC^{IUCN} (widely distributed; not found in Okinawa)
      - Ryukyu tube-nosed bat, Murina ryukyuana EN^{IUCN} (MOE: EN) (endemic to Ryūkyū Islands)
      - Gloomy tube-nosed bat, Murina tenebrosa CR^{IUCN} (MOE: DD) (endemic; not found since the type specimen was collected on Tsushima Island in 1962)
      - Ussuri tube-nosed bat, Murina ussuriensis LC^{IUCN} (widely distributed; not found in Okinawa)

== Order: Carnivora (carnivorans) ==
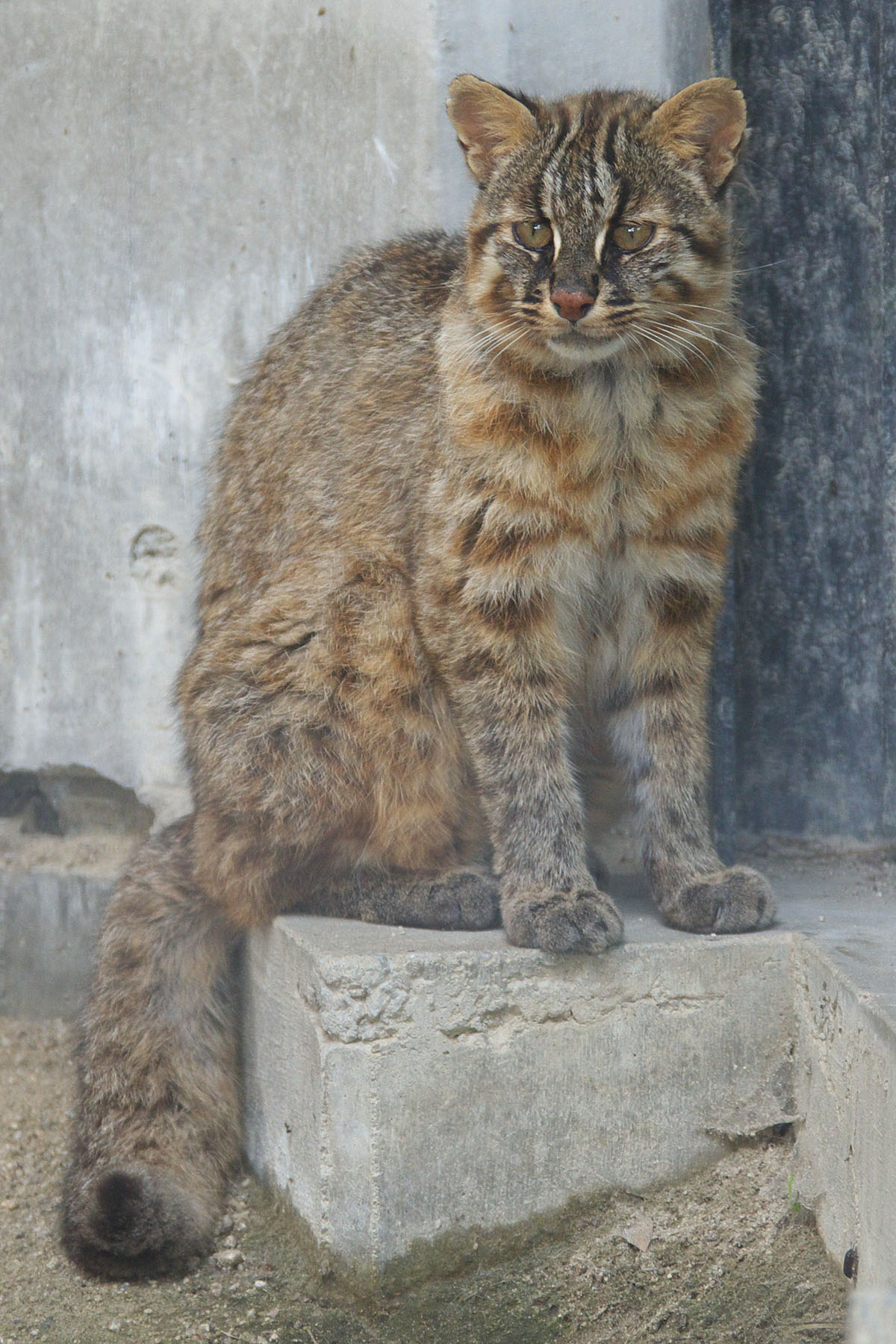
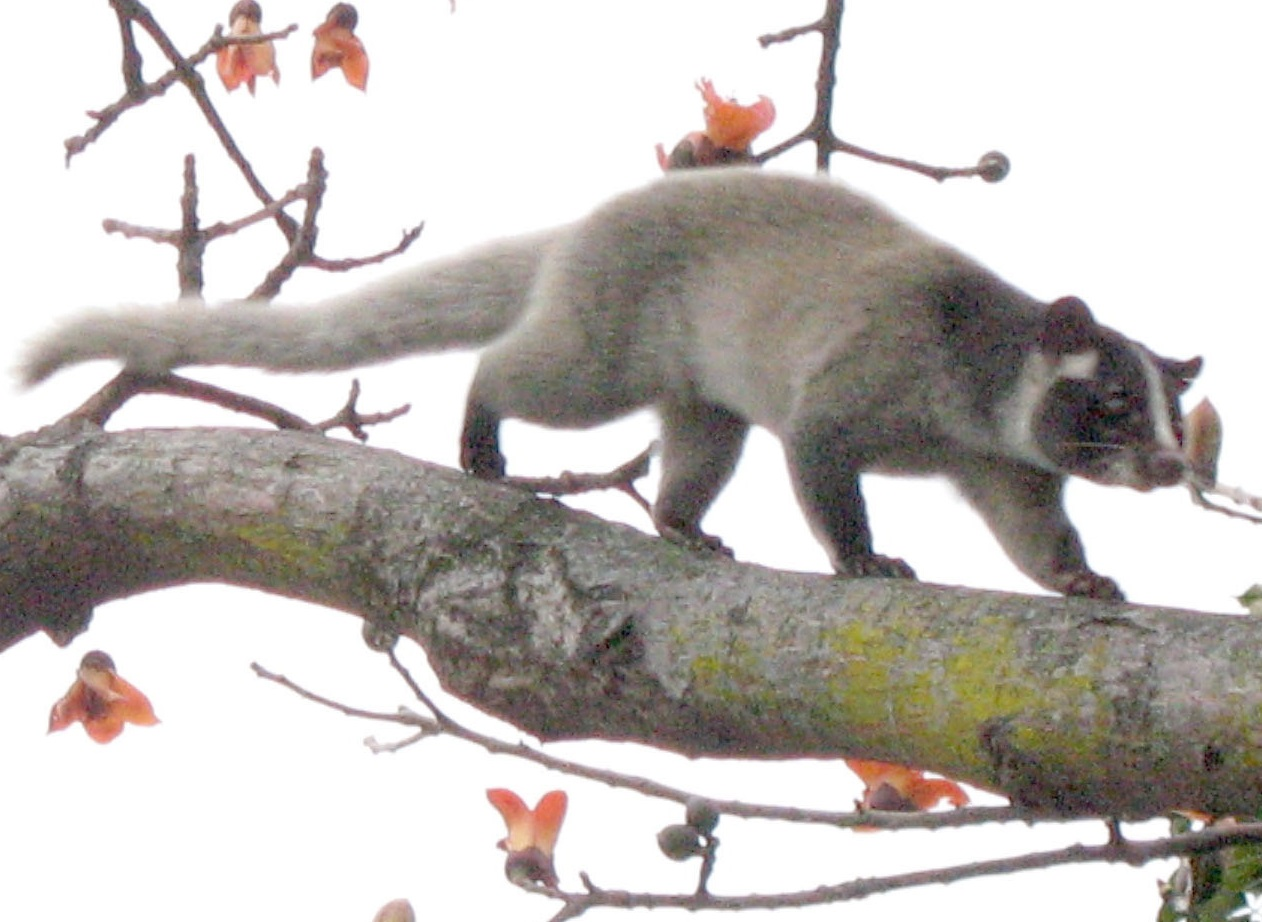
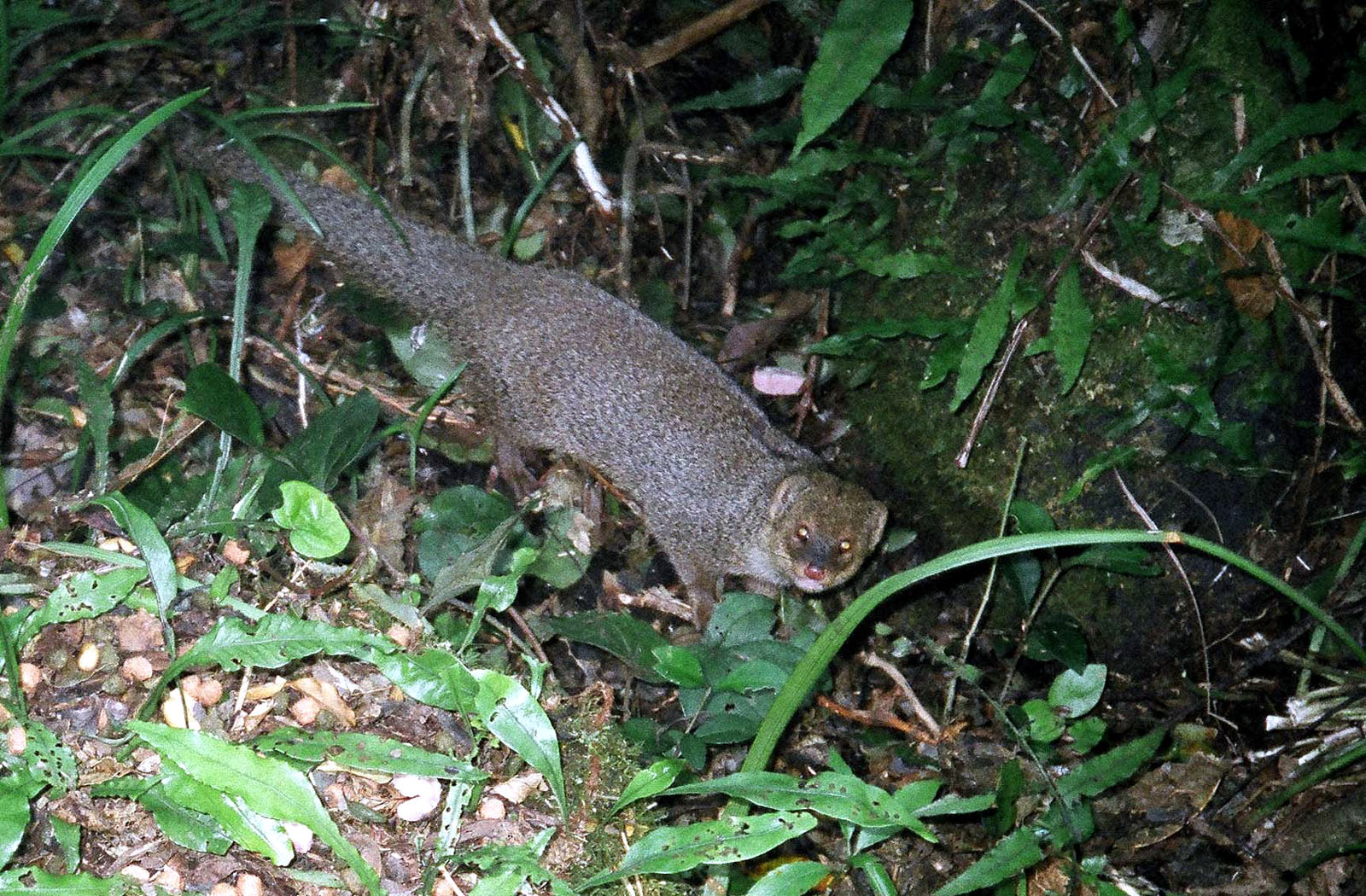
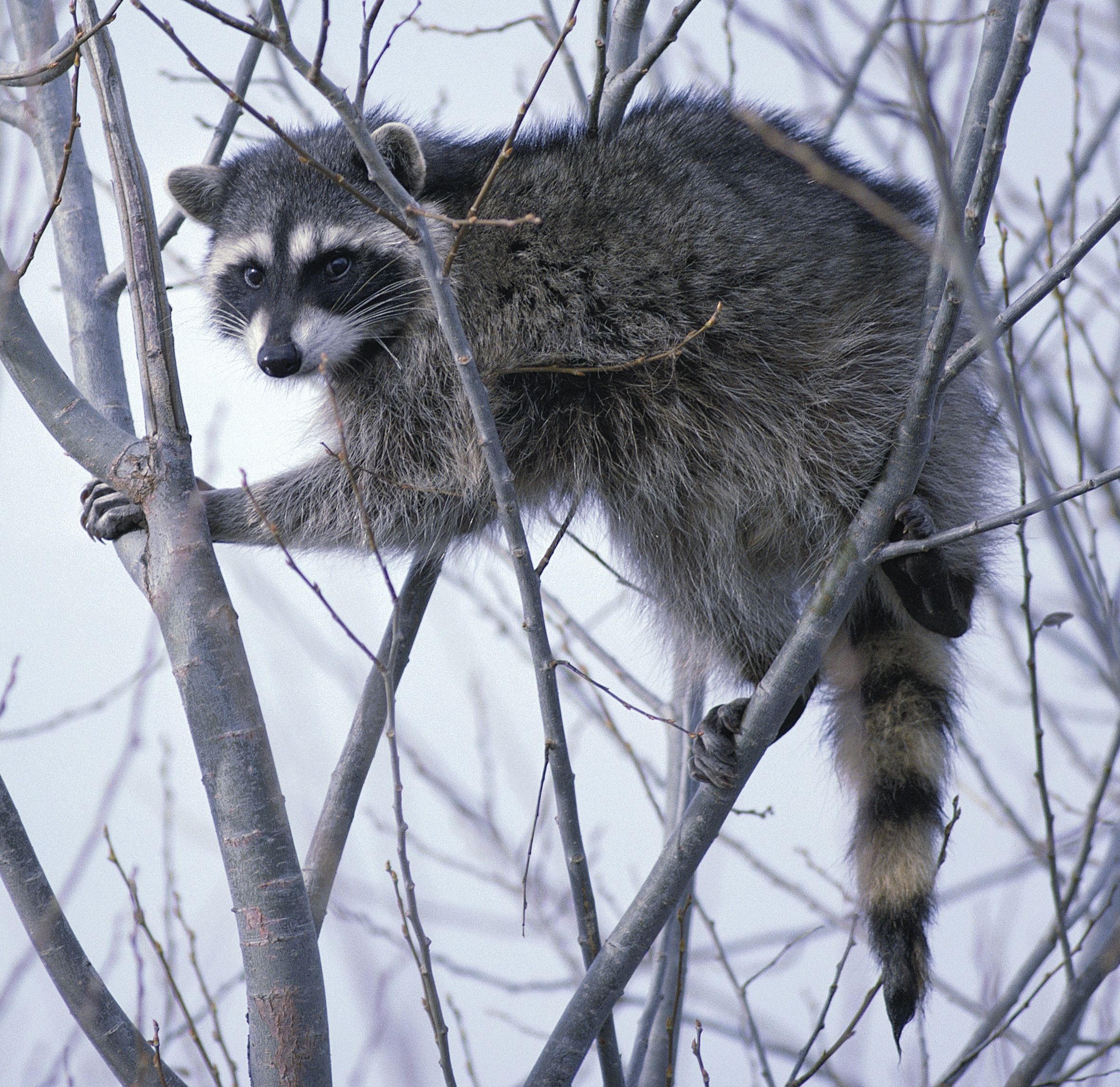
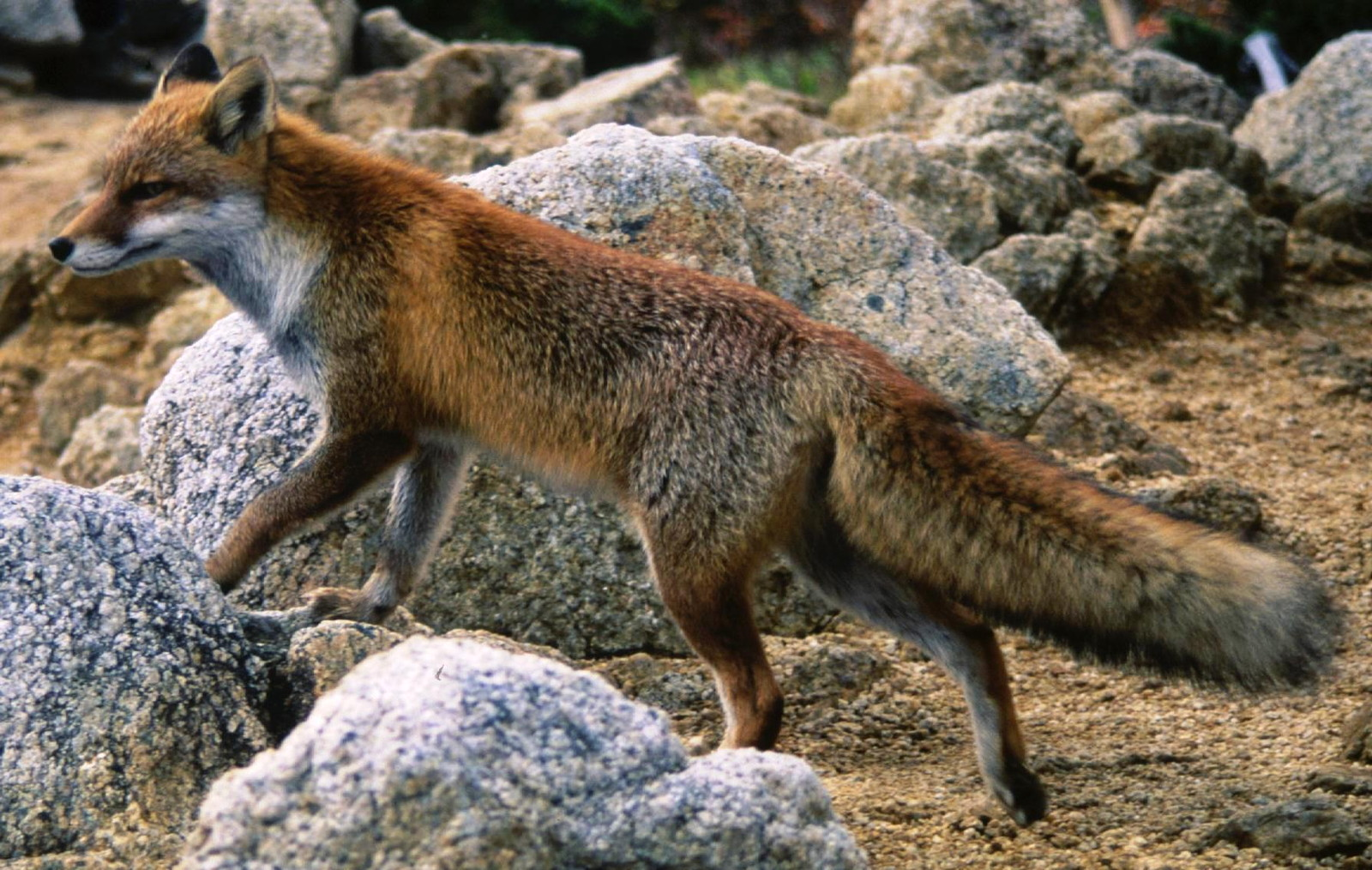
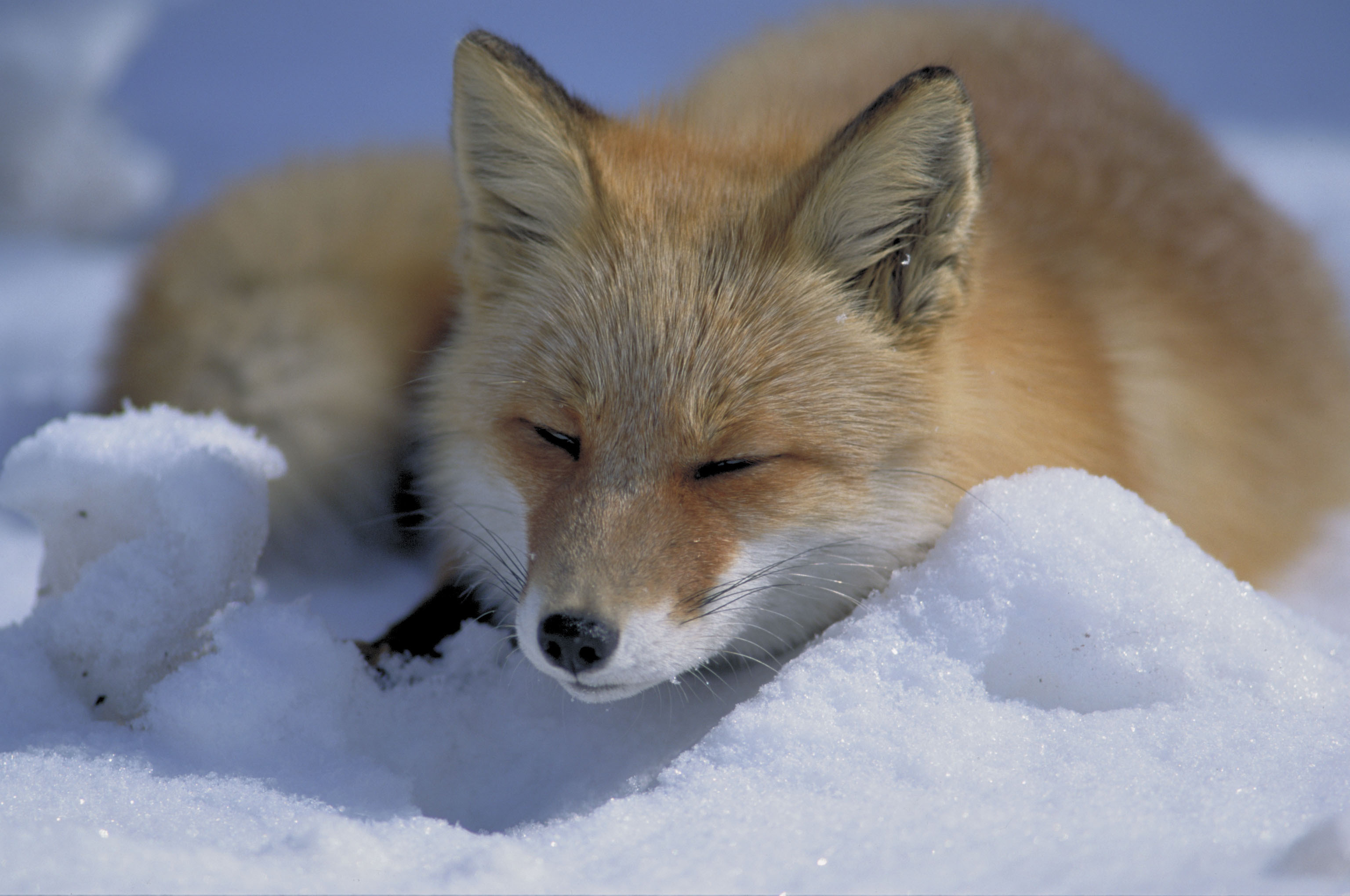
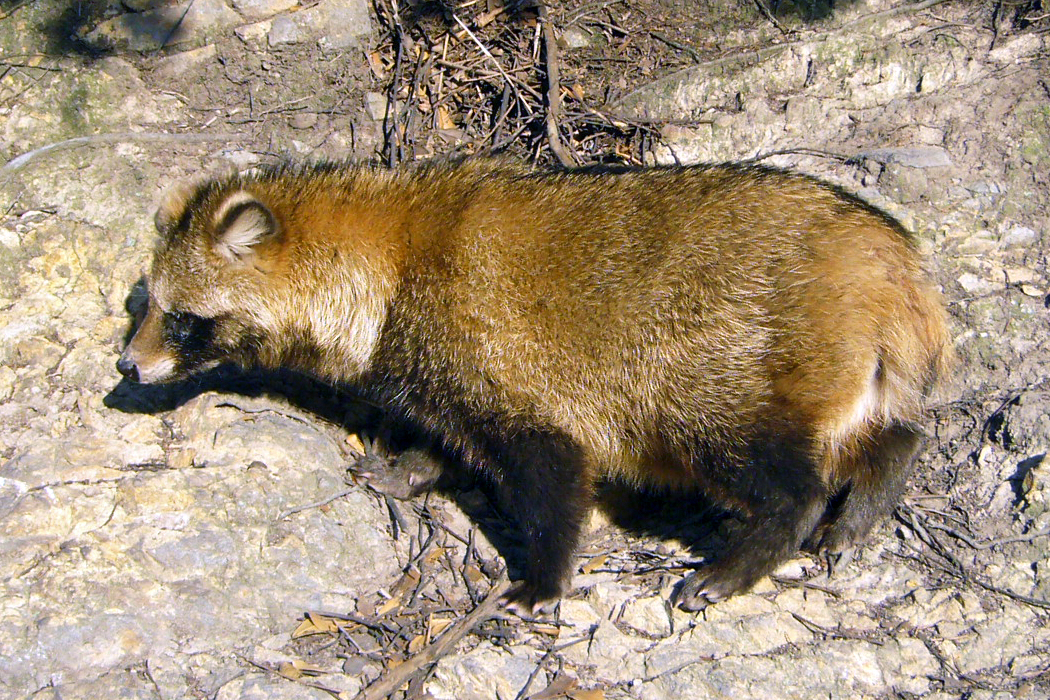
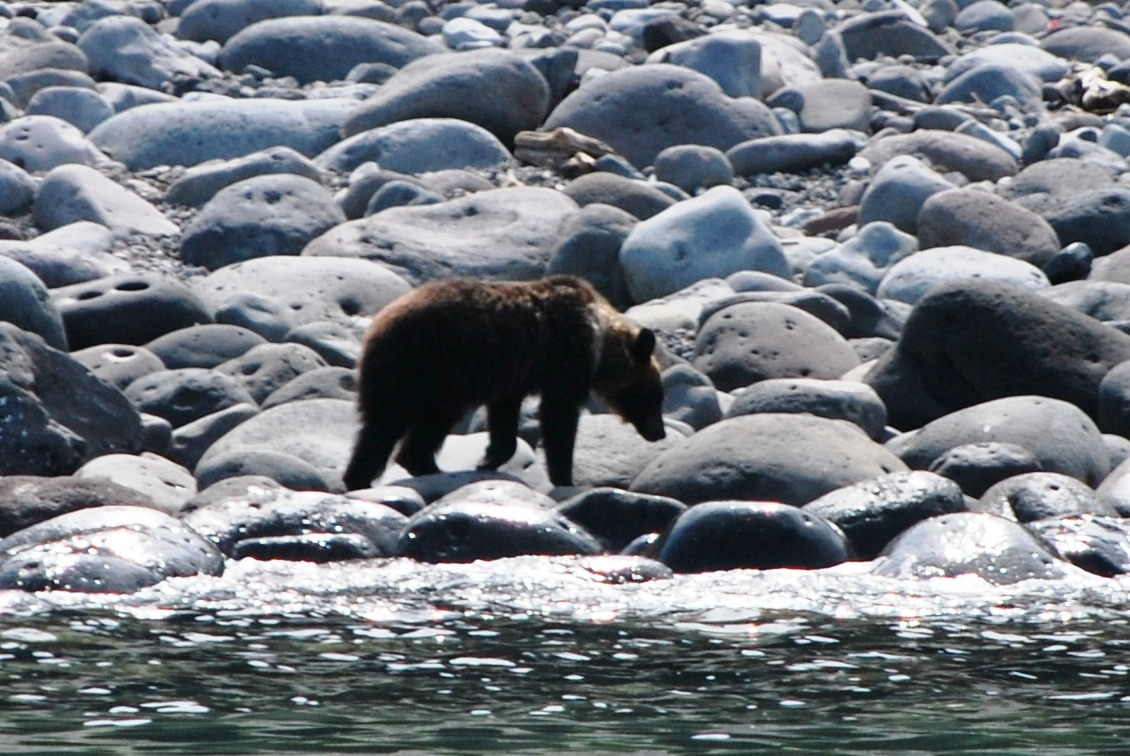
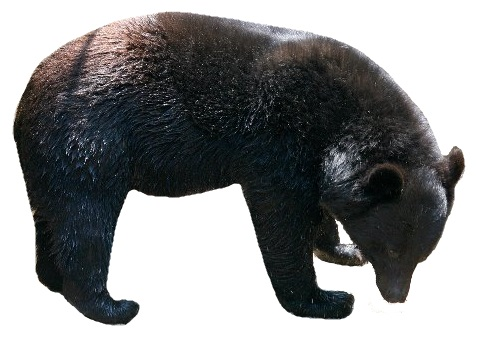
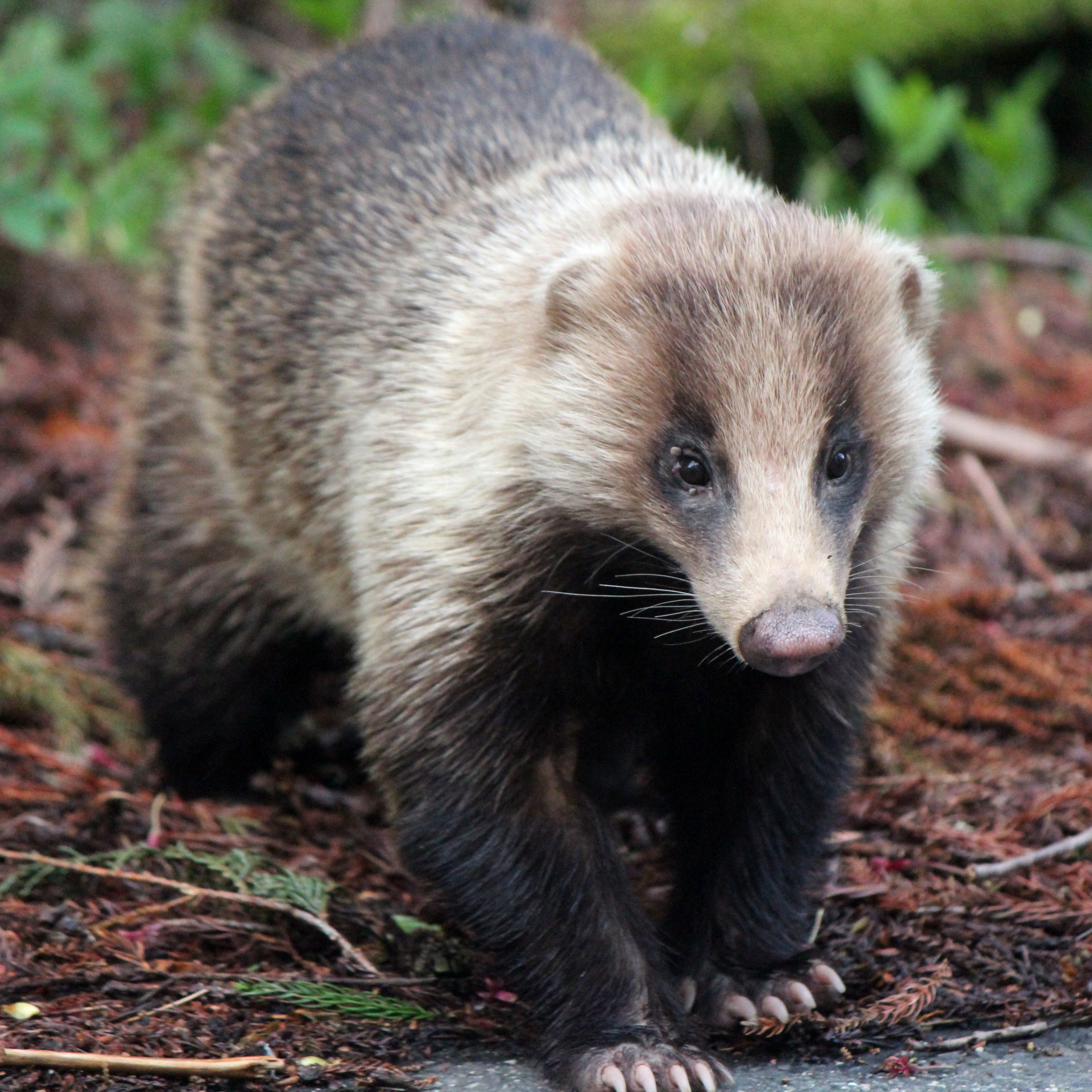
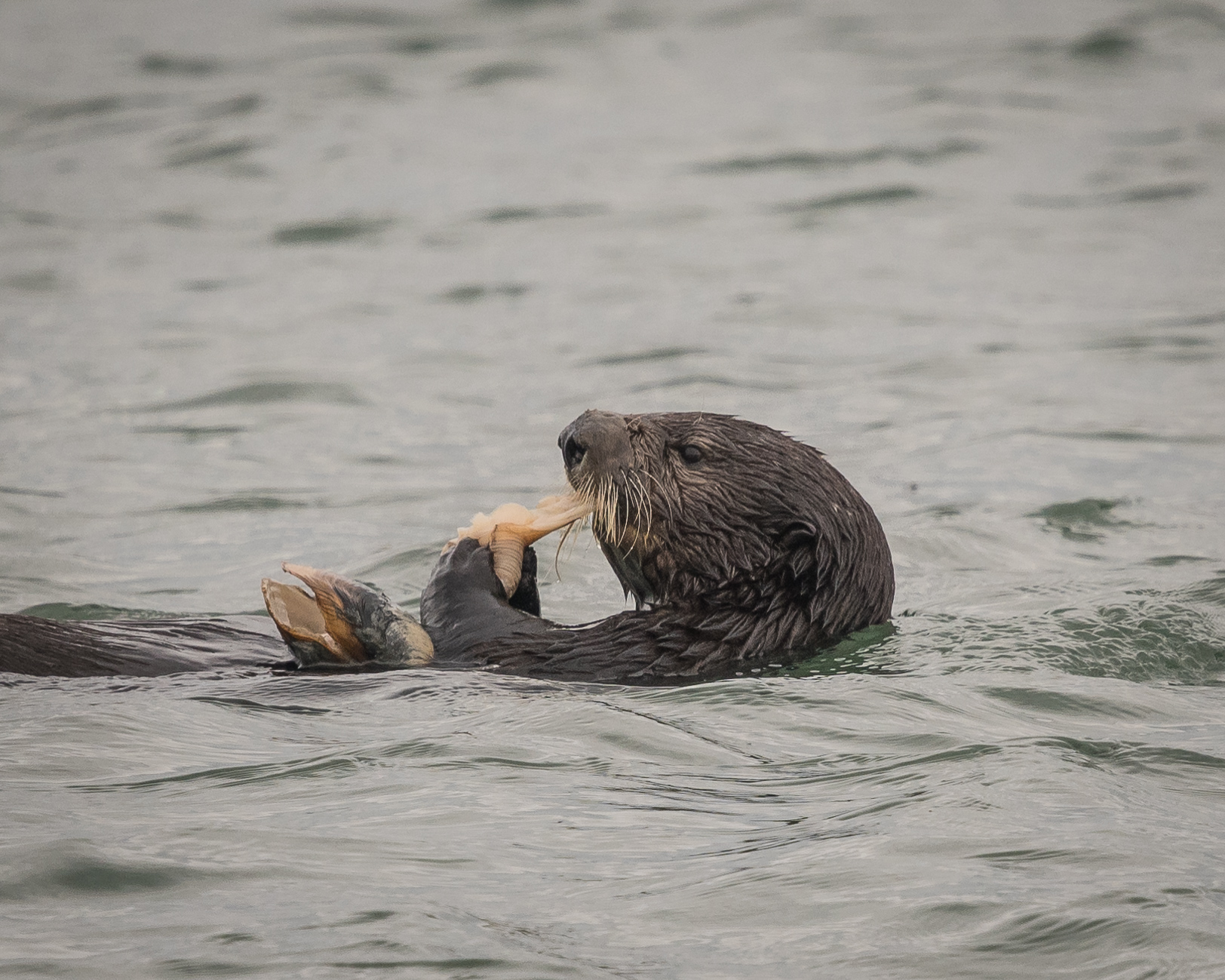
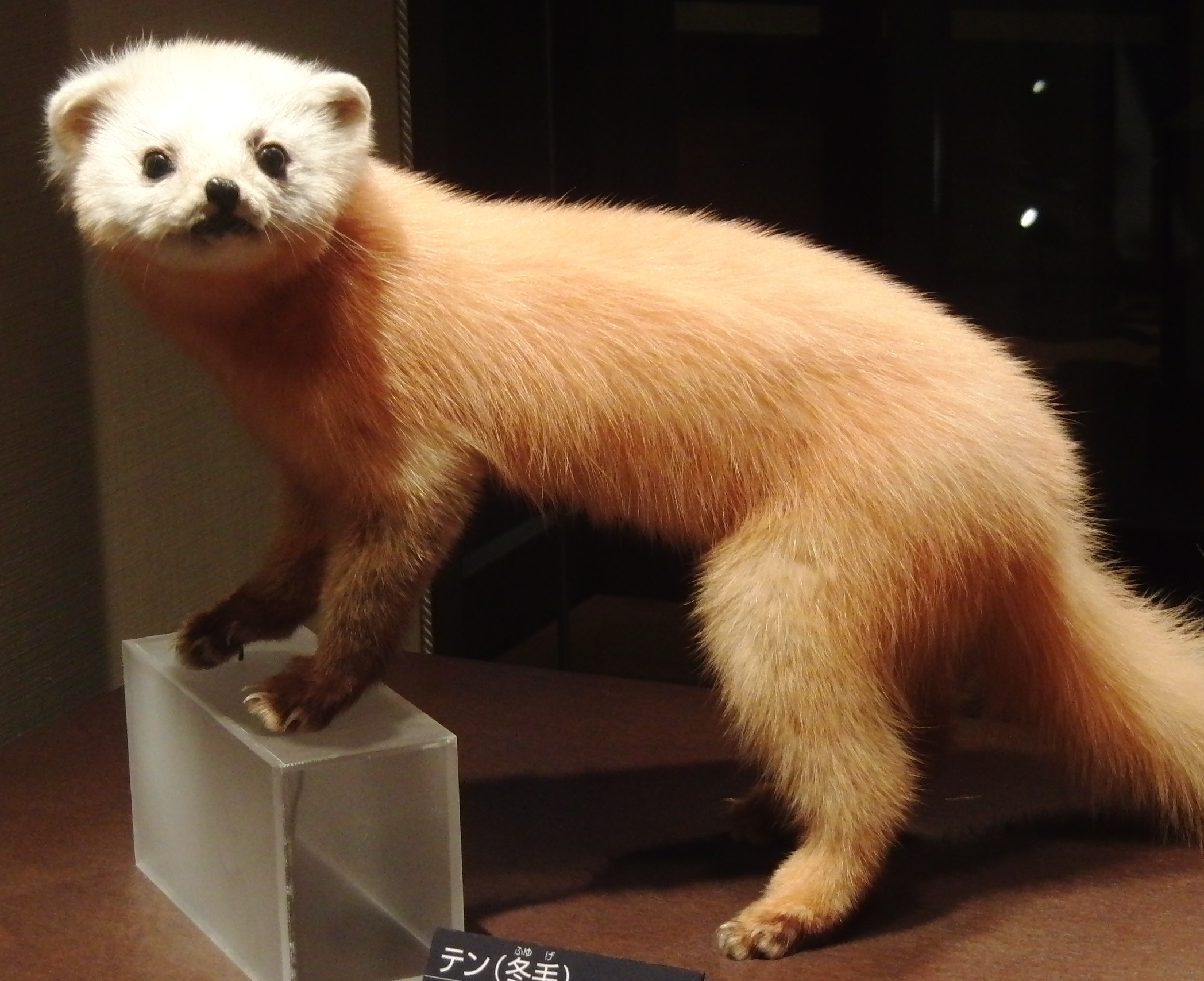
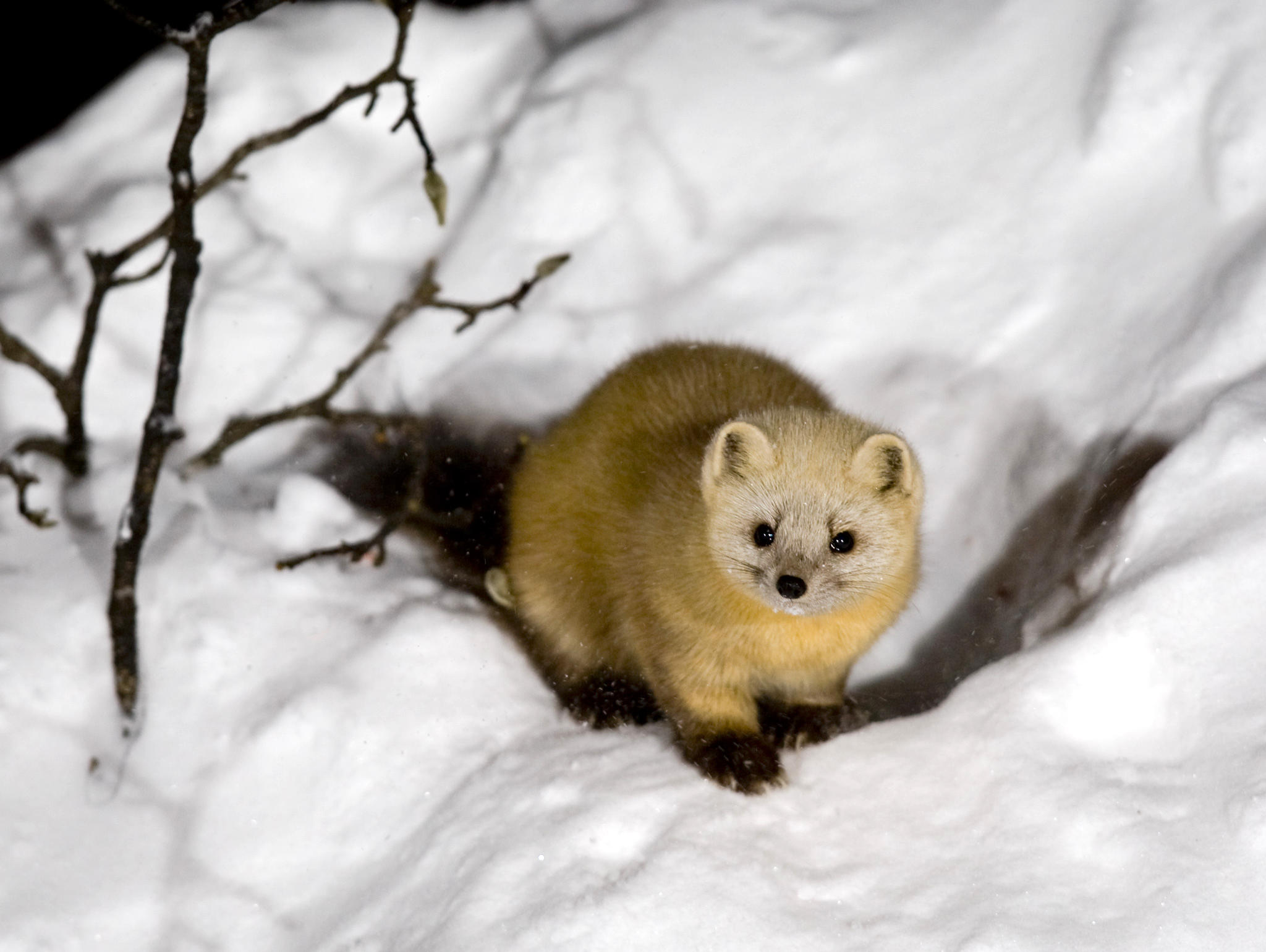
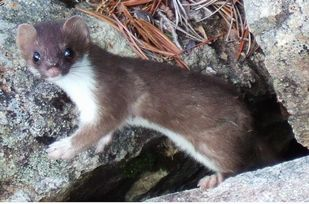
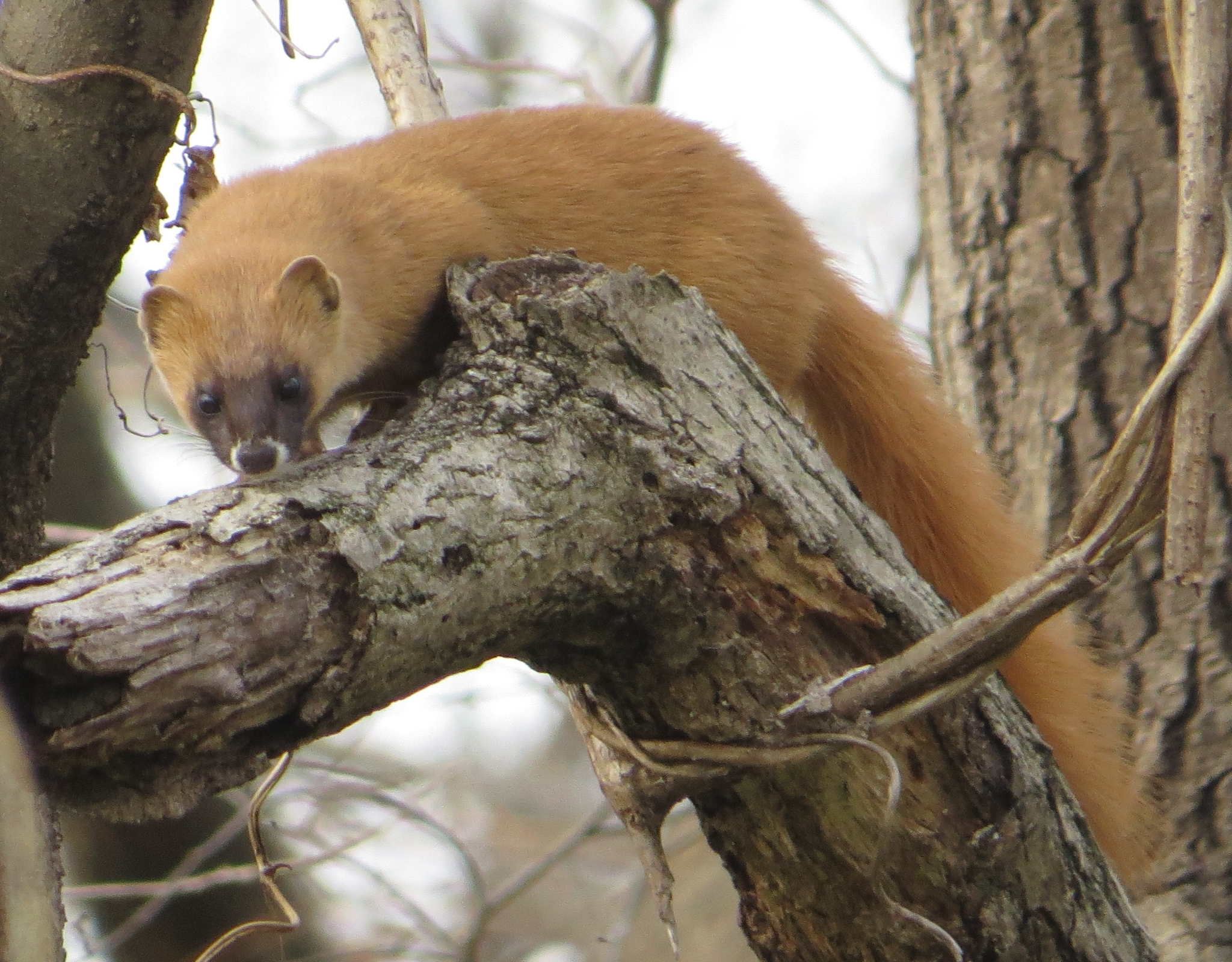
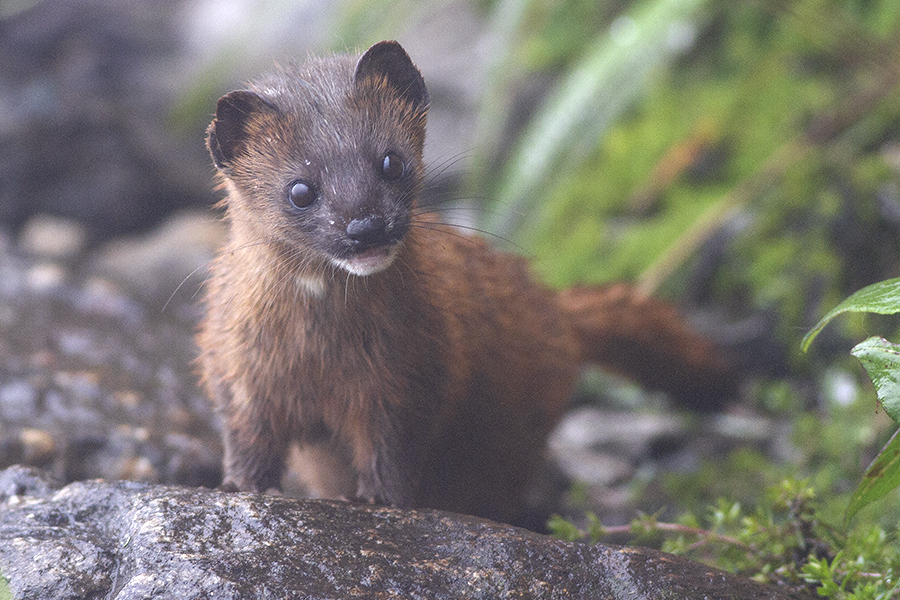
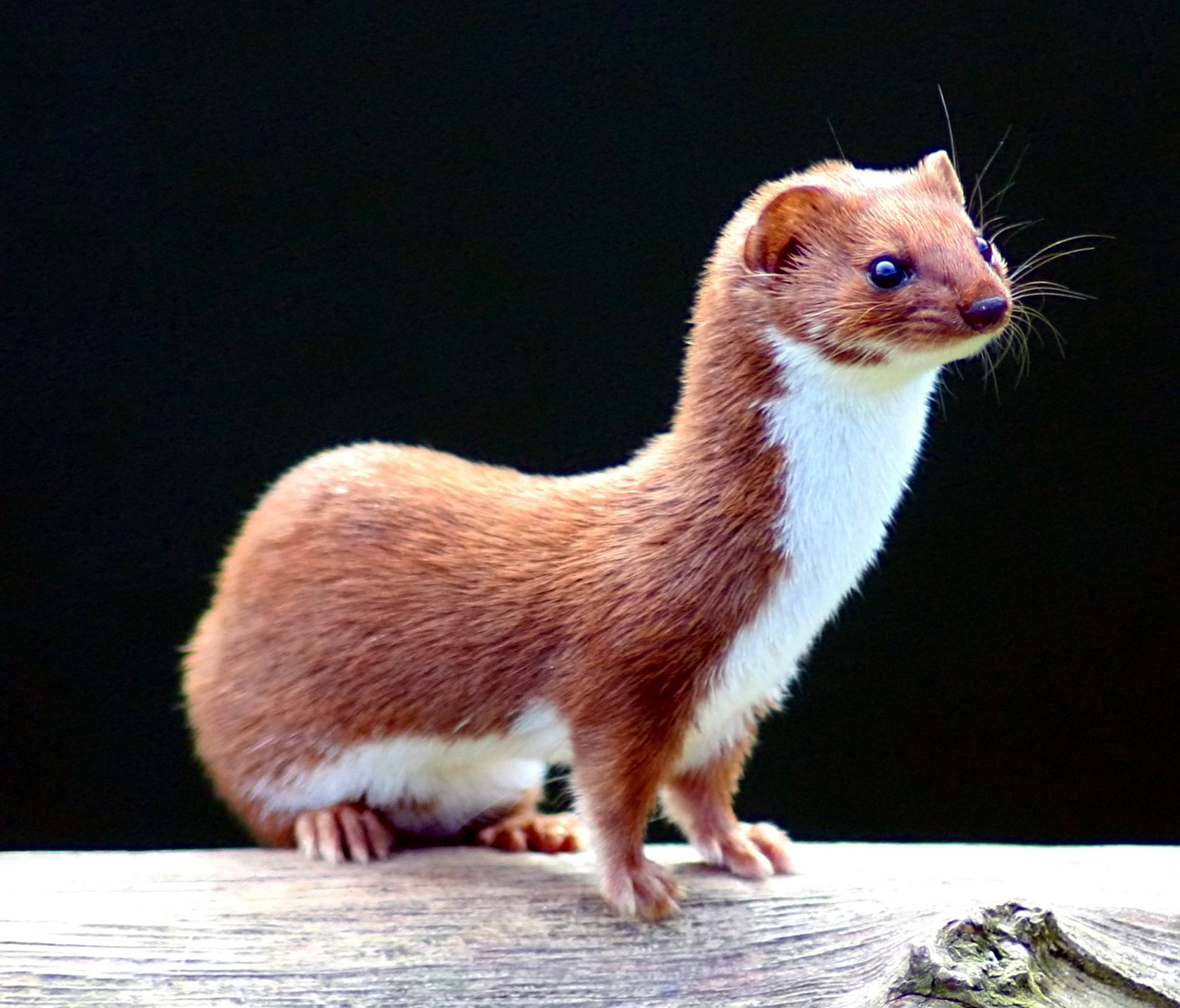
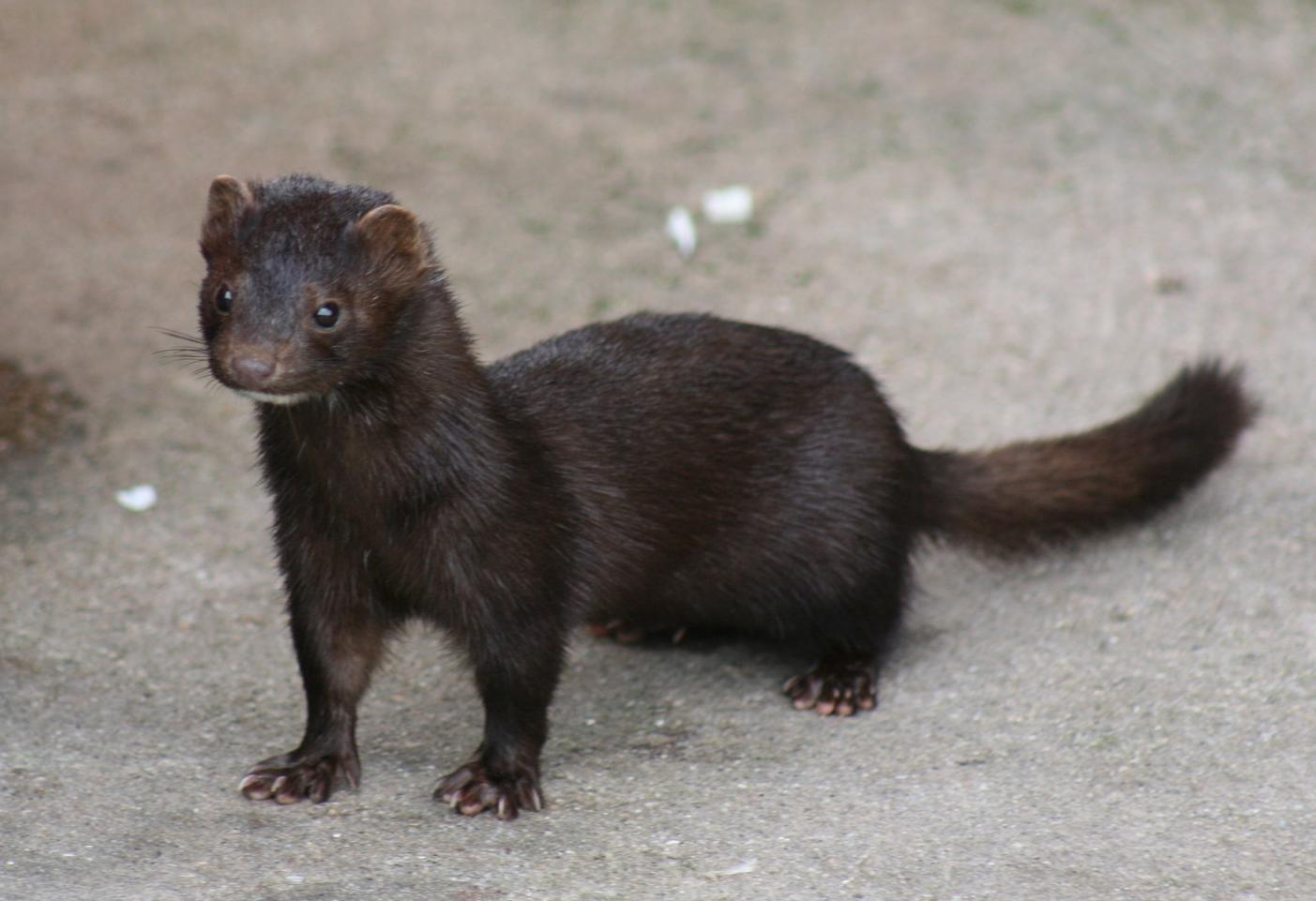
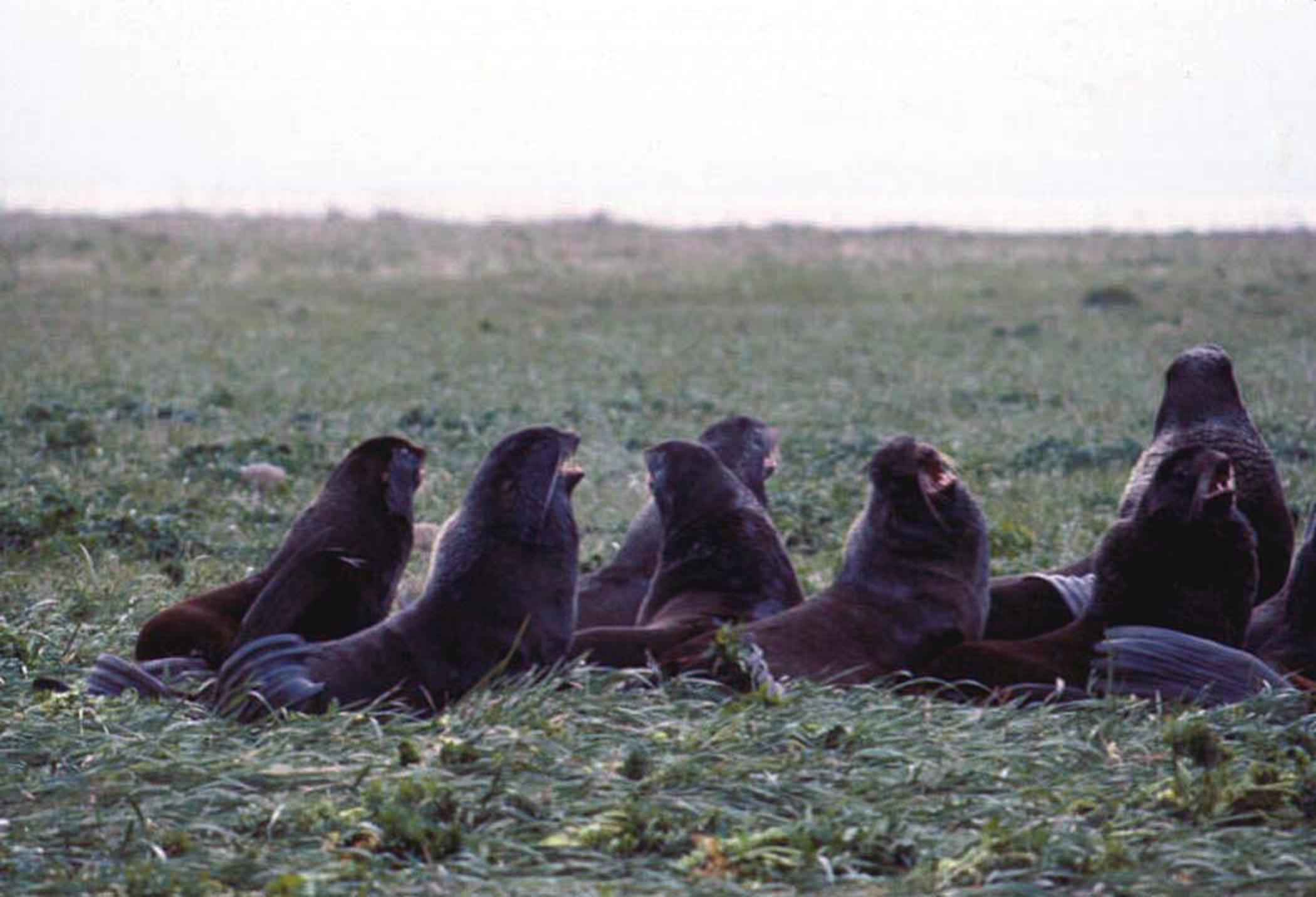
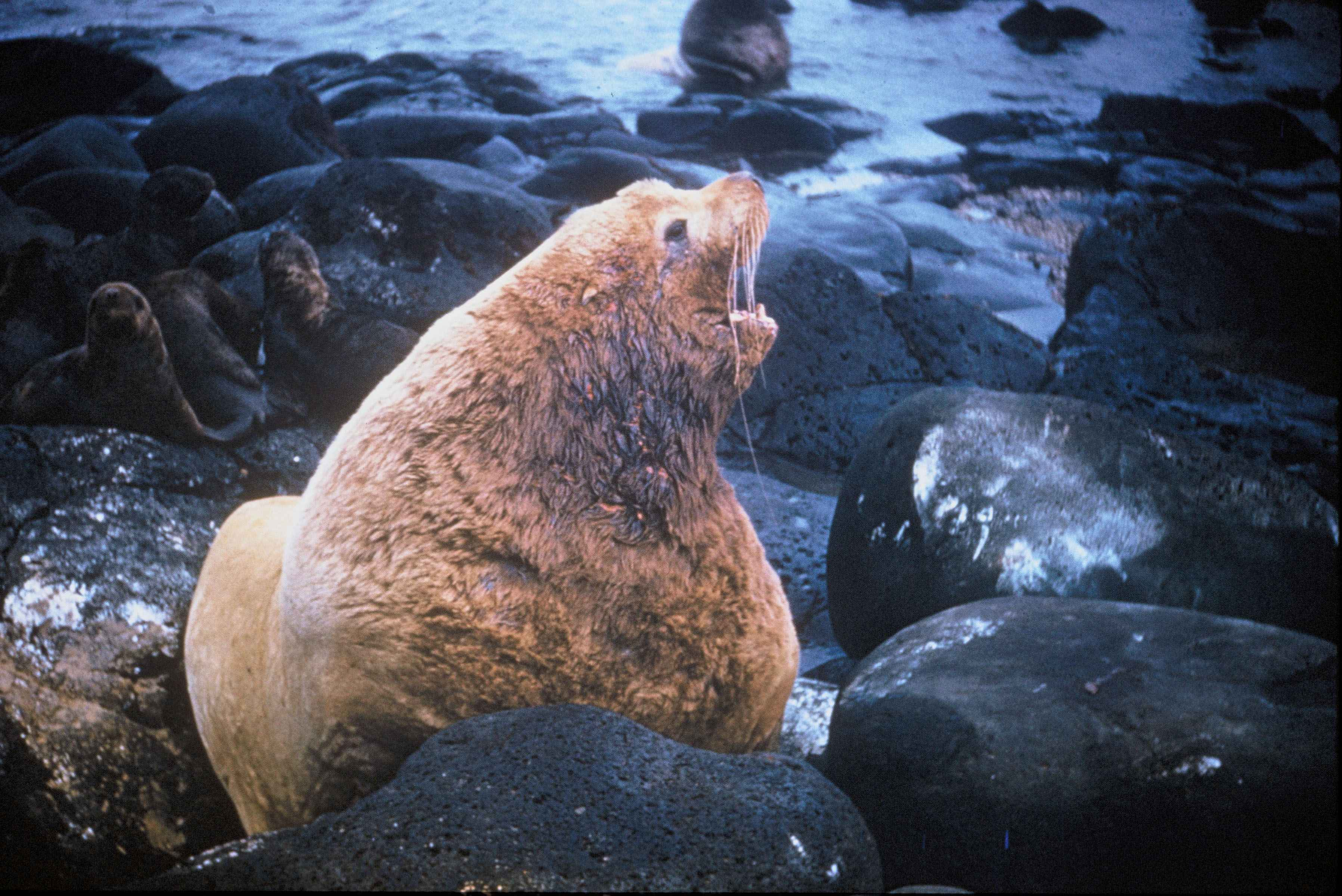
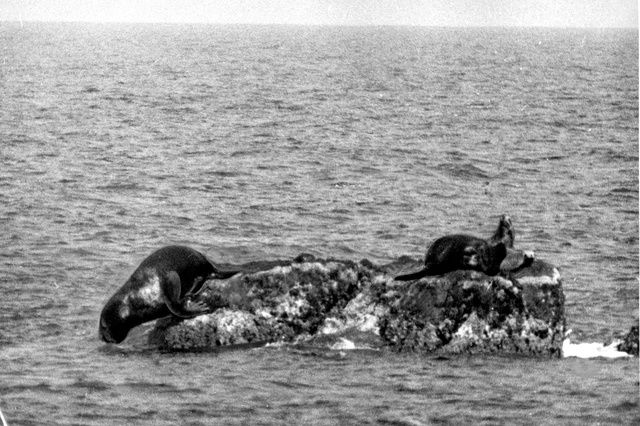
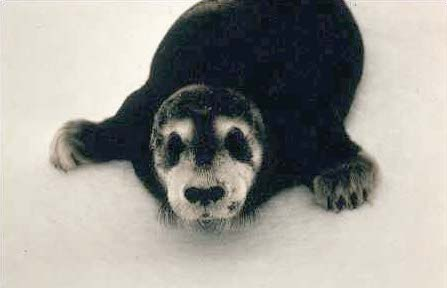
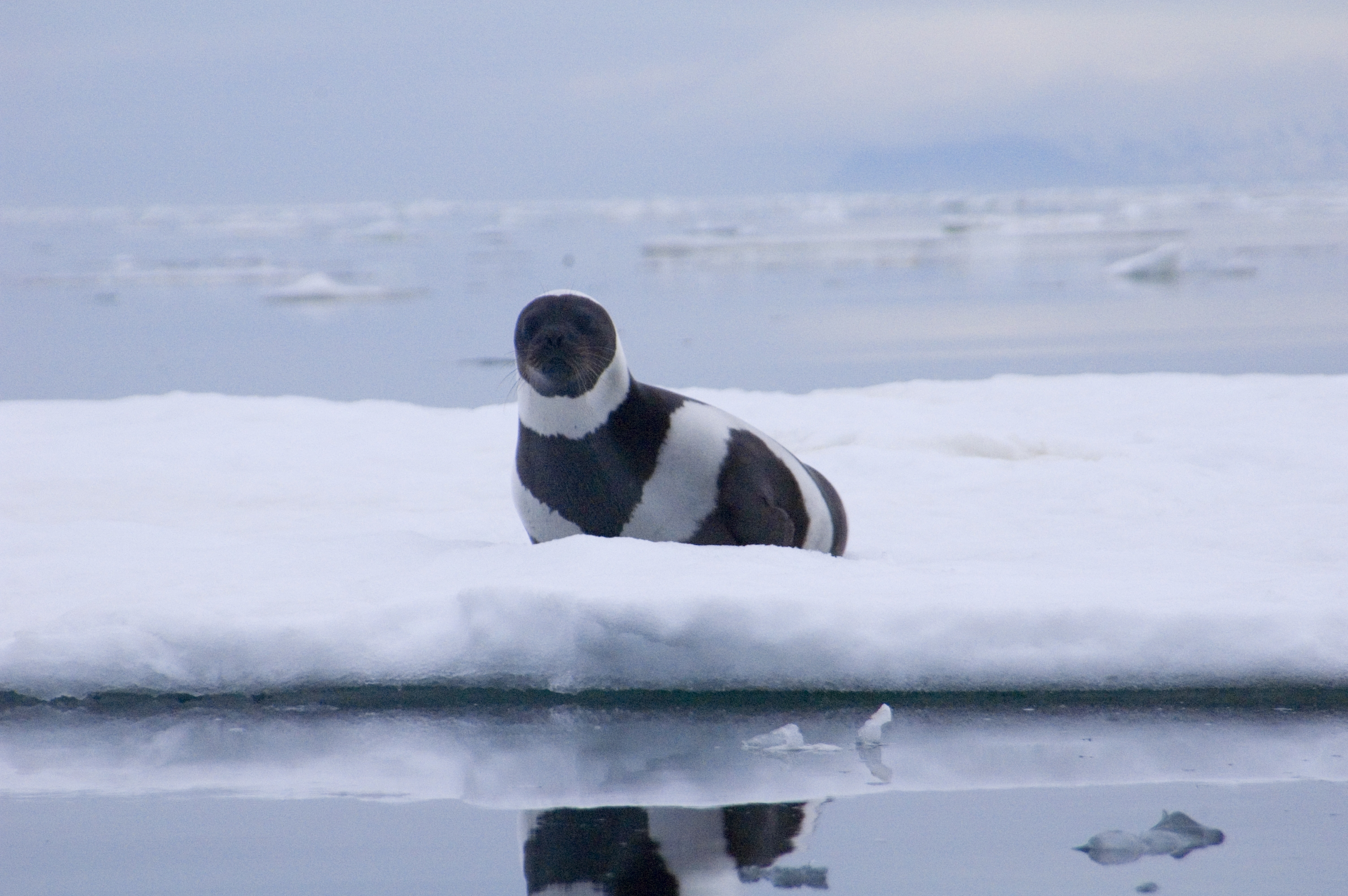
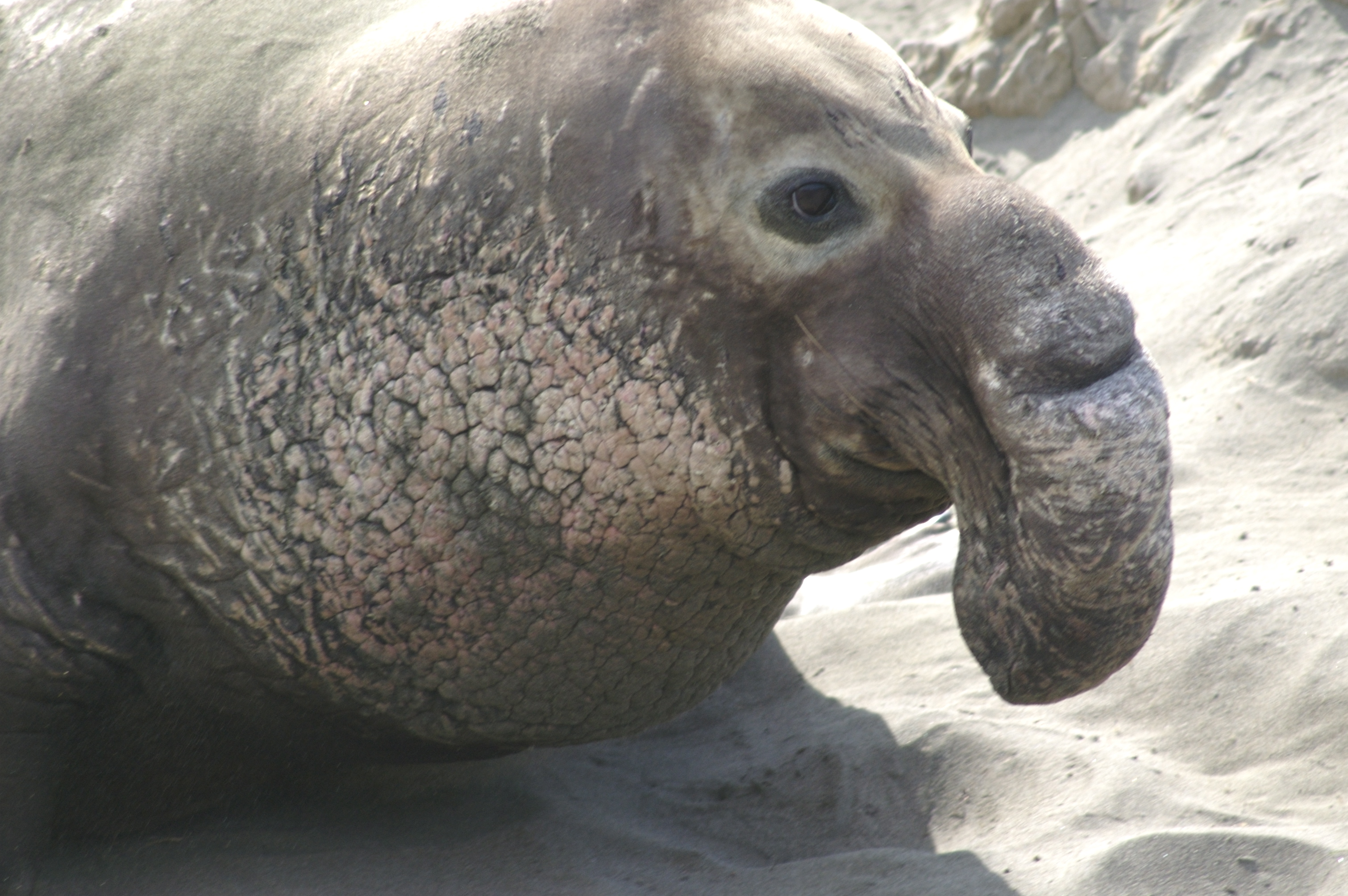
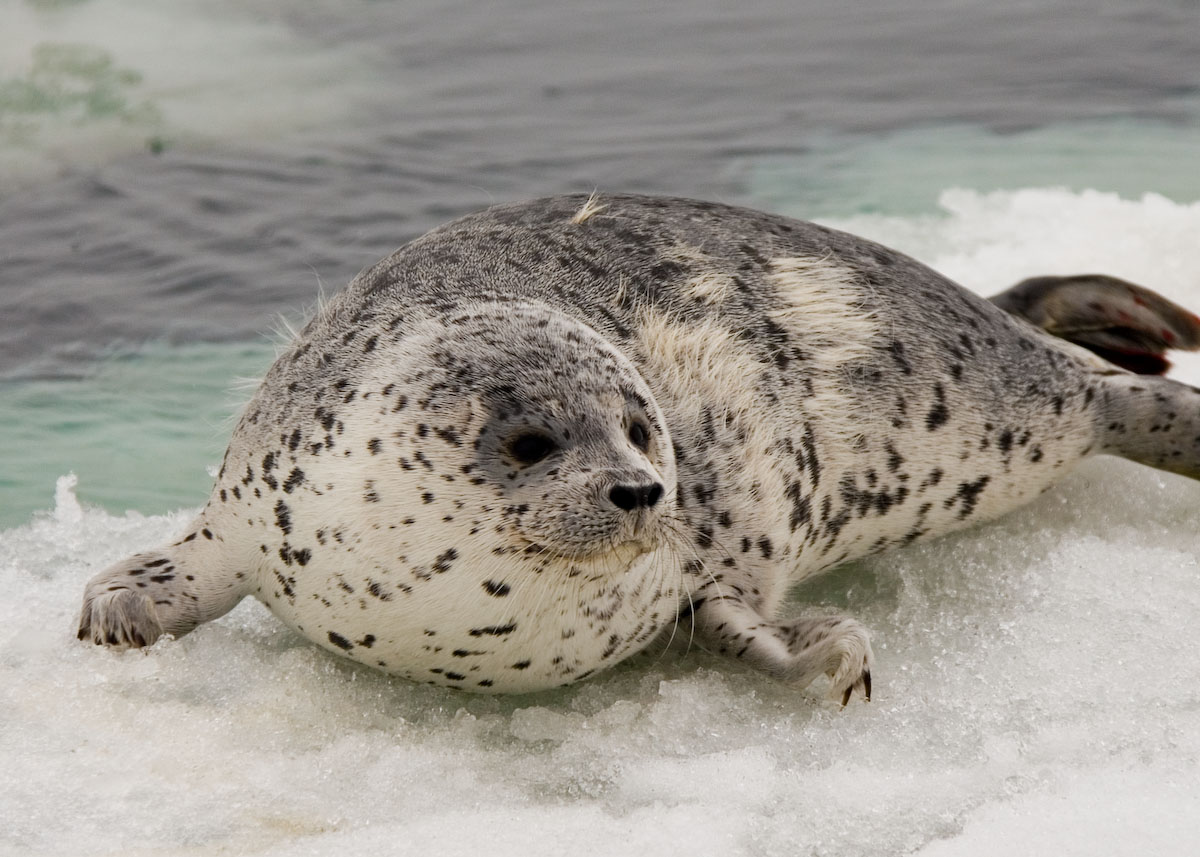
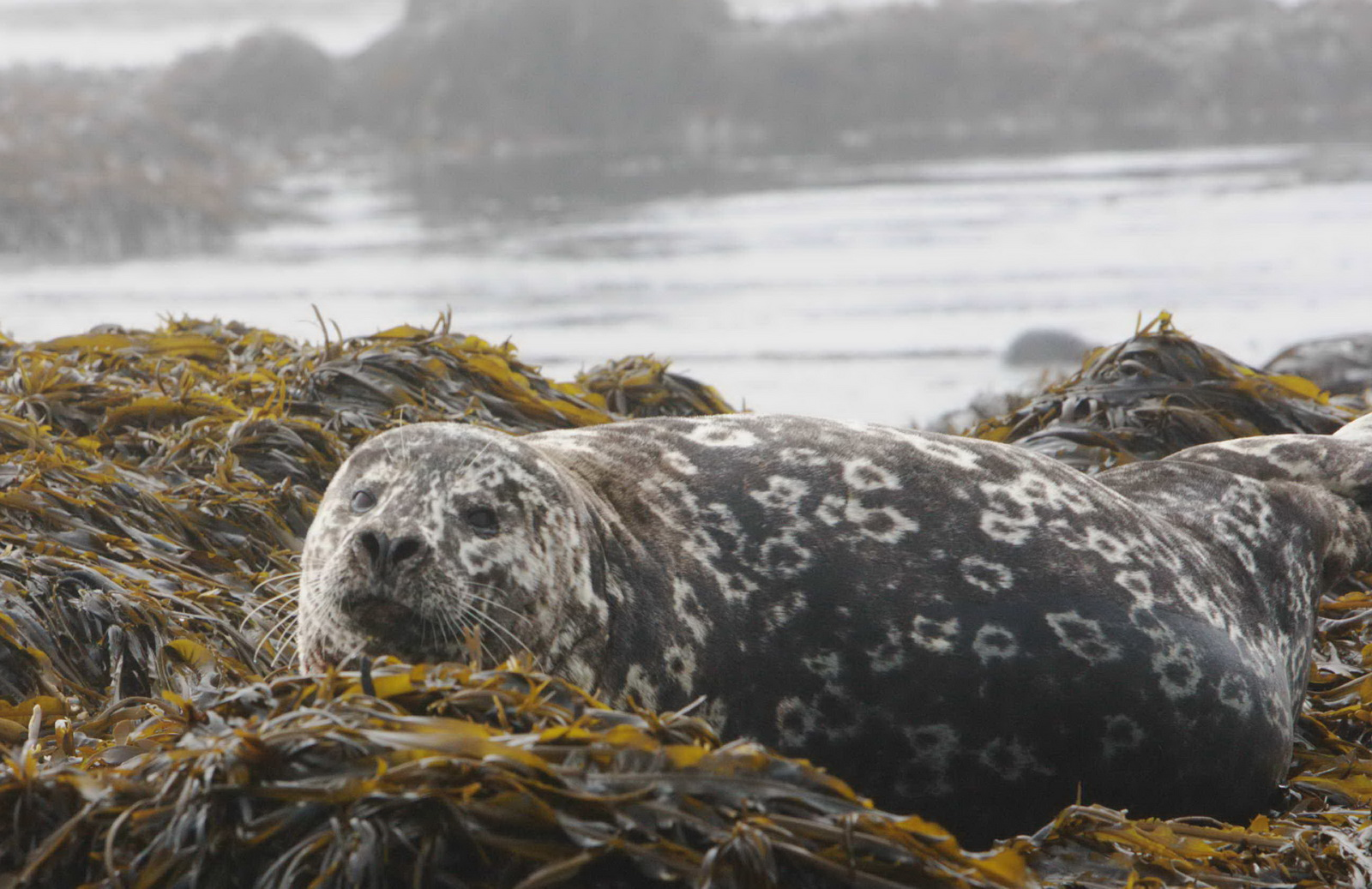
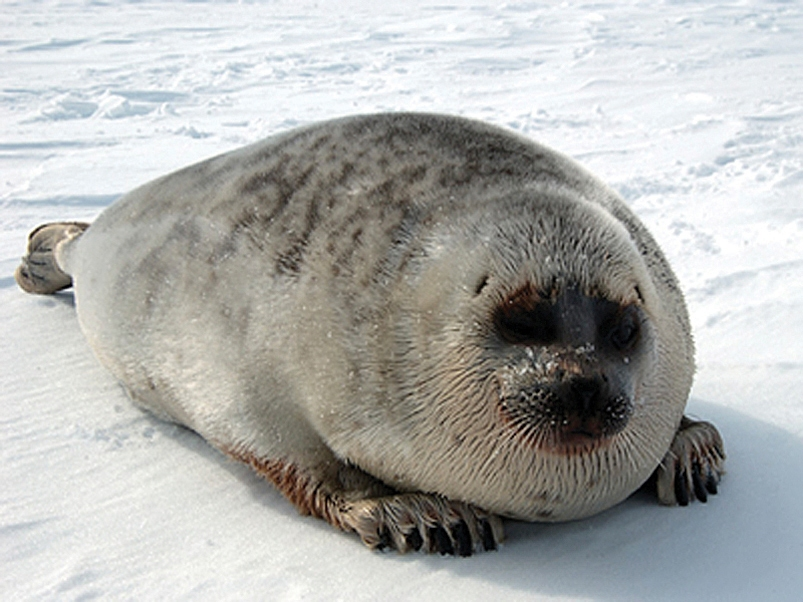
Tsushima leopard cat, masked palm civet, small Indian mongoose, raccoon, Japanese red fox, Ezo red fox, Japanese raccoon dog, Ezo brown bear, Japanese black bear, Japanese badger, sea otter, Japanese marten, Japanese sable, Japanese stoat, Japanese weasel, Siberian weasel, least weasel, American mink, northern fur seal, Steller sea lion, †Japanese sea lion, bearded seal, ribbon seal, northern elephant seal, spotted seal, Kuril seal, ringed seal

There are over 260 species of carnivorans, the majority of which feed primarily on meat. They have a characteristic skull shape and dentition. Wolves and otters are now believed to be extinct in Japan.

- Suborder: Feliformia
  - Family: Felidae (cats)
    - Subfamily: Felinae
      - Genus: Prionailurus
        - Leopard cat, Prionailurus bengalensis LC
          - P. b. euptilurus, two populations:
            - Tsushima leopard cat [ja] (MOE: CR) (Tsushima Island; Natural Monument)
            - Iriomote cat (MOE: CR) (Iriomote; Special Natural Monument)
      - Genus: Lynx
        - Eurasian lynx, Lynx lynx LC extirpated in prehistory
    - Subfamily: Pantherinae
      - Genus: Panthera
        - Leopard, Panthera pardus VU extirpated in prehistory
        - Tiger, Panthera tigris EN extirpated in prehistory
  - Family: Viverridae (civets)
    - Genus: Paguma
      - Masked palm civet, Paguma larvata LC^{IUCN} (introduced; Honshū, Shikoku, Kyūshū, Ryukyu)
  - Family: Herpestidae
    - Genus: Urva
      - Small Indian mongoose, Urva auropunctata LC^{IUCN} (introduced on Okinawa Island and Amami Ōshima and in areas of the cities of Satsumasendai and Kagoshima)
- Suborder: Caniformia
  - Family: Canidae (dogs, foxes)
    - Genus: Vulpes
      - Red fox, Vulpes vulpes LC^{IUCN}
        - Japanese red fox, V. v. japonica (Honshū, Shikoku, Kyūshū)
        - Ezo red fox, V. v. schrencki (Hokkaidō)
    - Genus: Nyctereutes
      - Japanese raccoon dog, Nyctereutes viverrinus NE (endemic; Honshū, Shikoku, Kyūshū, and adjacent smaller islands; tanuki habitat in Yamaguchi is a Natural Monument)
        - Ezo raccoon dog, N. v. albus (Hokkaidō, Okushiri Island)
        - N. v. viverrinus
    - Genus: Canis
      - Grey wolf, Canis lupus LC extirpated
        - Hokkaido wolf, C. l. hattai EX (Hokkaidō)
        - Japanese wolf, C. l. hodophilax EX (Honshū, Shikoku, Kyūshū)
  - Family: Ursidae (bears)
    - Genus: Ursus
      - Brown bear, Ursus arctos LC^{IUCN}
        - Ussuri brown bear, U. a. lasiotus (Hokkaidō, Kunashiri, Etorofu)
      - Asiatic black bear, Ursus thibetanus VU^{IUCN}
        - Japanese black bear, U. t. japonicus (Honshū and Shikoku, formerly also Kyūshū)
  - Family: Procyonidae (raccoons)
    - Genus: Procyon
      - Raccoon, Procyon lotor LC^{IUCN} (introduced from the Americas)
  - Family: Mustelidae (mustelids)
    - Genus: Meles
      - Japanese badger, Meles anakuma LC^{IUCN} (endemic; Honshū, Shikoku, Kyūshū)
    - Genus: Enhydra
      - Sea otter, Enhydra lutris EN^{IUCN} (MOE: CR) (eastern Hokkaidō)
    - Genus: Lutra
      - Eurasian otter, Lutra lutra NT (Tsushima Island)
        - Japanese river otter, L. l. nippon (MOE: EX) (last recorded on Honshū in 1954 and in Kōchi in 1979)
        - Hokkaido river otter, L. l. whiteleyi (MOE: EX)
    - Genus: Martes
      - Japanese marten, Martes melampus LC^{IUCN} (endemic; Honshū, Shikoku, Kyūshū)
        - M. m. melampus
        - Tsushima marten, M. m. tsuensis (MOE: NT) (endemic; Tsushima Island; Natural Monument)
      - Sable, Martes zibellina LC^{IUCN}
        - Japanese sable, M. z. brachyura (MOE: EN) (Hokkaidō)
    - Genus: Mustela
      - Stoat, Mustela erminea LC^{IUCN}
        - Japanese stoat, M. e. nippon (MOE: NT) (central and northern Honshū)
        - Ezo stoat, M. e. orientalis (MOE: NT) (Hokkaidō)
      - Japanese weasel, Mustela itatsi NT^{IUCN} (endemic to Honshū, Shikoku, Kyūshū, and adjacent smaller islands; introduced to Hokkaidō, Rishiri Island, Rebun Island, Ryūkyū Islands, etc., for rat control)
        - M. i. itatsi
        - Yakushima weasel, M. i. sho
      - Siberian weasel, Mustela sibirica LC^{IUCN} (MOE: EN) (native on Tsushima Island, introduced to western Japan)
        - M. s. coreana (Tsushima Island)
      - Least weasel, Mustela nivalis LC^{IUCN}
        - Japanese least weasel, M. n. namiyei (MOE: NT) (Tōhoku)
        - North weasel, M. n. nivalis (Hokkaidō)
    - Genus: Neogale
      - American mink, Neogale vison LC^{IUCN} (introduced; Hokkaidō, Nagano, Fukushima; records from elsewhere in Honshū and Kyūshū)
  - Family: Otariidae (eared seals, sealions)
    - Genus: Callorhinus
      - Northern fur seal, Callorhinus ursinus VU^{IUCN} (northern Japan)
    - Genus: Eumetopias
      - Steller sea lion, Eumetopias jubatus NT^{IUCN} (MOE: NT)
        - Western Steller sea lion, E. j. jubatus EN^{IUCN} (Hokkaidō and Shimokita Peninsula)
    - Genus: Zalophus
      - Japanese sea lion, Zalophus japonicus EX (MOE: CR) (last recorded on Takeshima in 1975)
  - Family: Phocidae (earless seals)
    - Genus: Erignathus
      - Bearded seal, Erignathus barbatus LC^{IUCN} (Hokkaidō and vagrant)
        - Pacific bearded seal, E. b. nauticus LC^{IUCN} (vagrant)
    - Genus: Histriophoca
      - Ribbon seal, Histriophoca fasciata LC^{IUCN} (northeast Hokkaidō)
    - Genus: Mirounga
      - Northern elephant seal, Mirounga angustirostris LC^{IUCN} (vagrant)
    - Genus: Phoca
      - Spotted seal, Phoca largha LC^{IUCN} (Hokkaidō)
      - Harbour seal, Phoca vitulina LC^{IUCN} (MOE: NT) (Hokkaidō)
        - Kuril seal, P. v. stejnegeri DD^{IUCN} (eastern Hokkaidō)
    - Genus: Pusa
      - Ringed seal, Pusa hispida LC^{IUCN} (especially northern Hokkaidō)

== Order: Artiodactyla (even-toed ungulates) ==
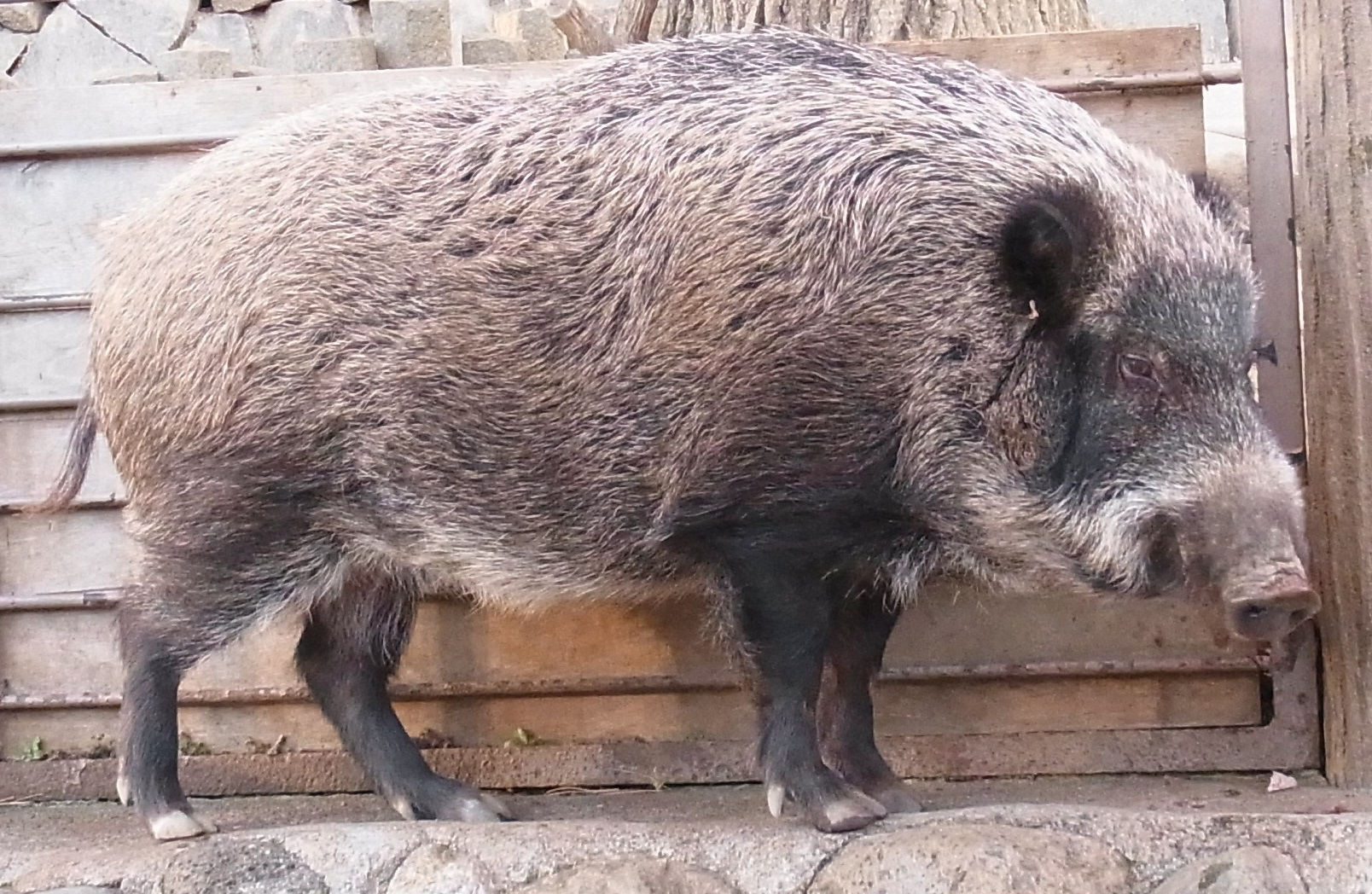
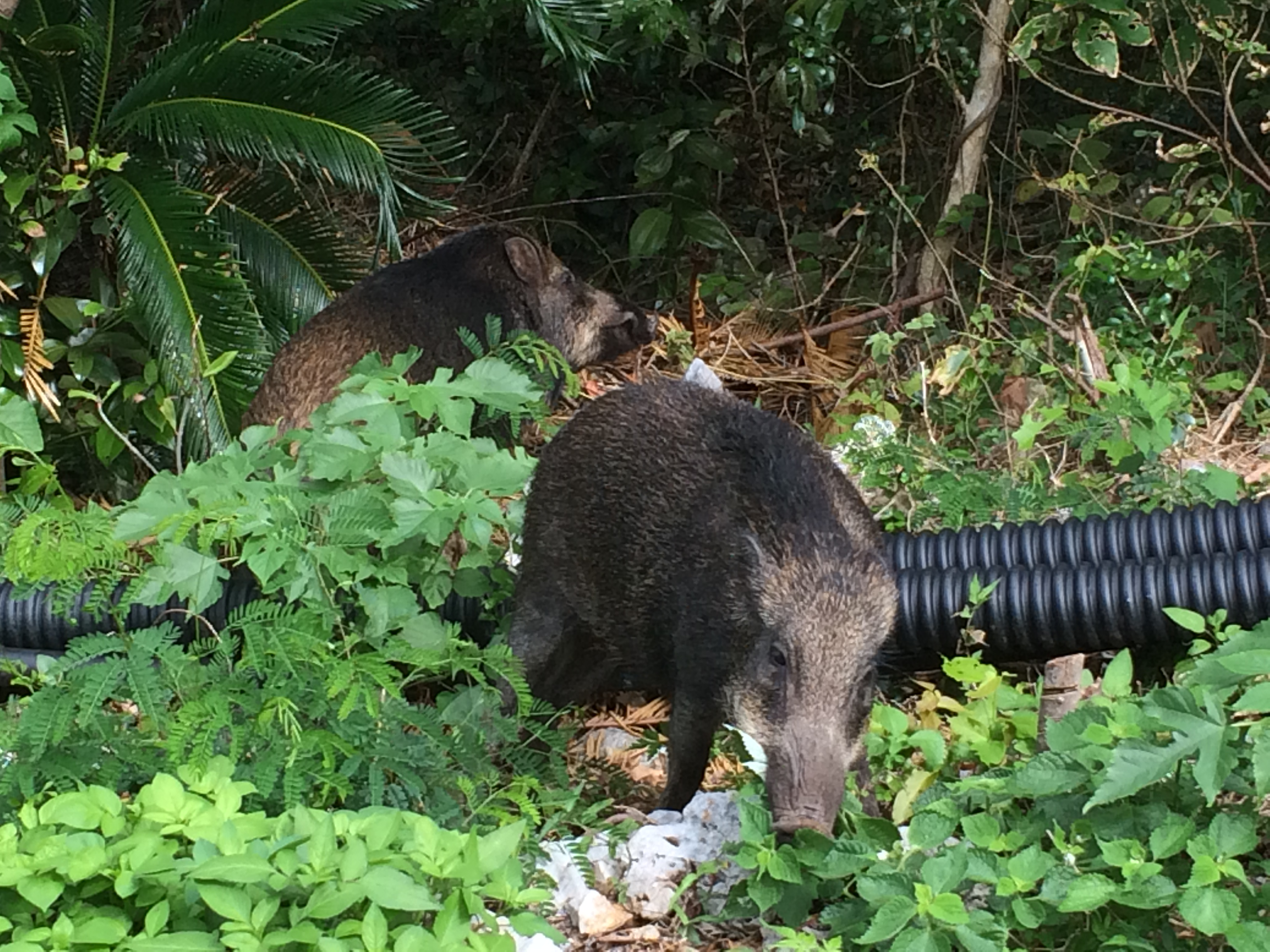
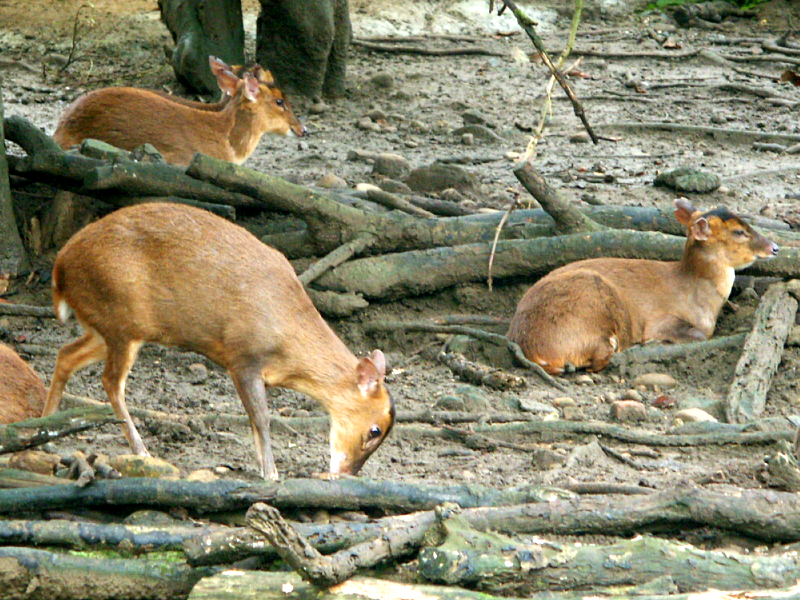
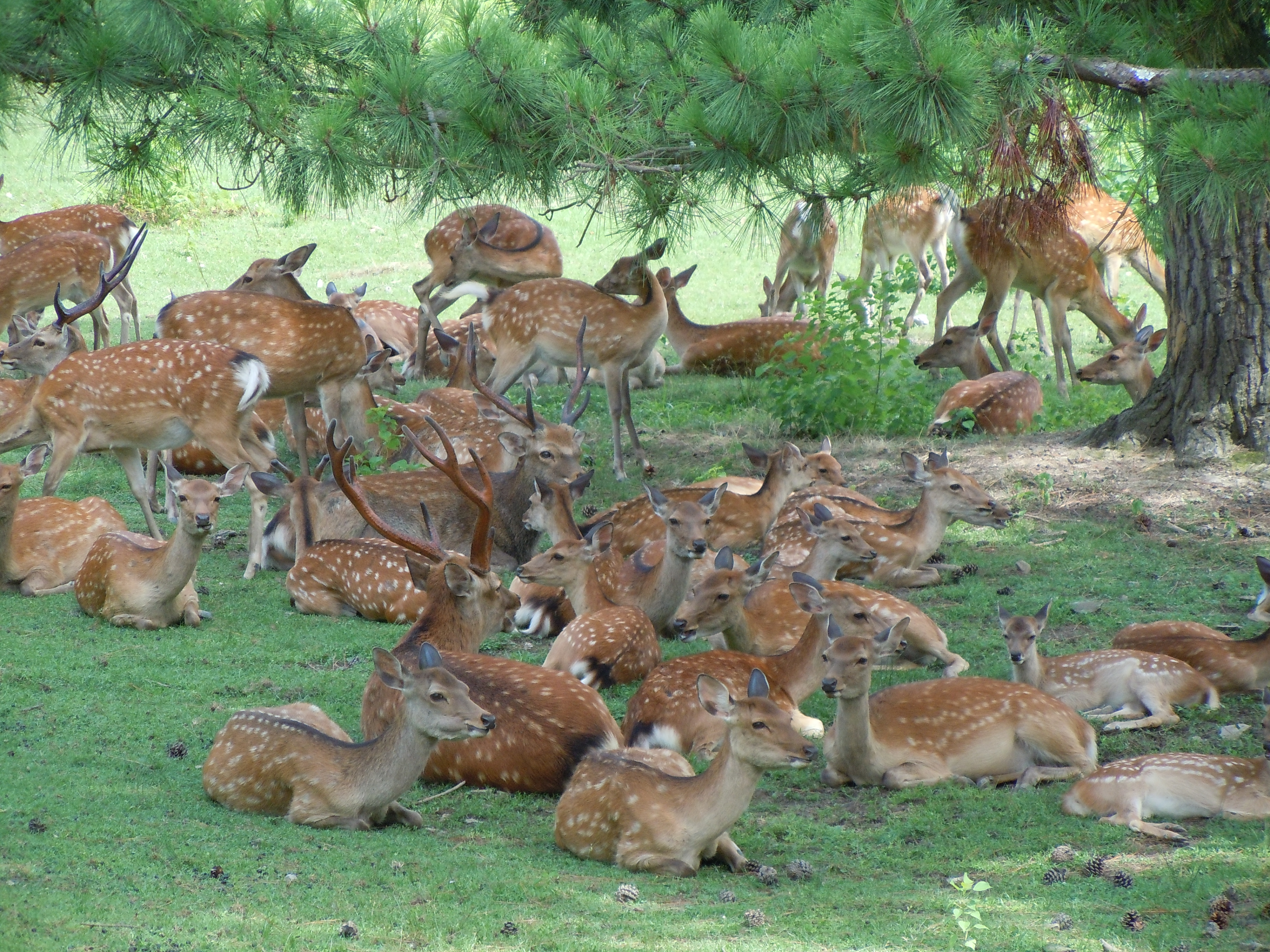
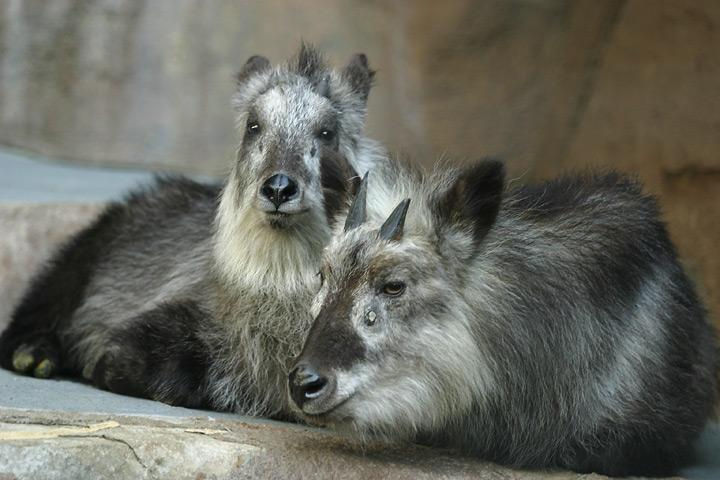
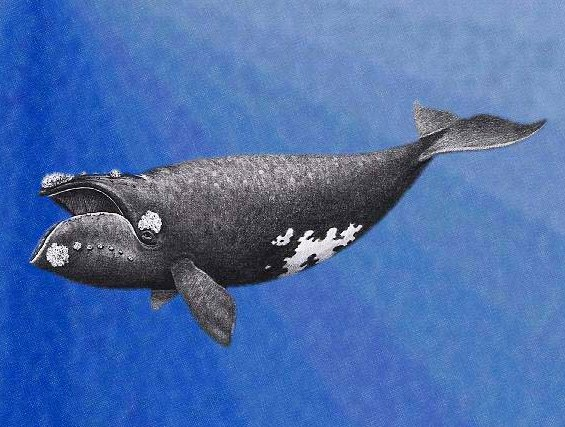
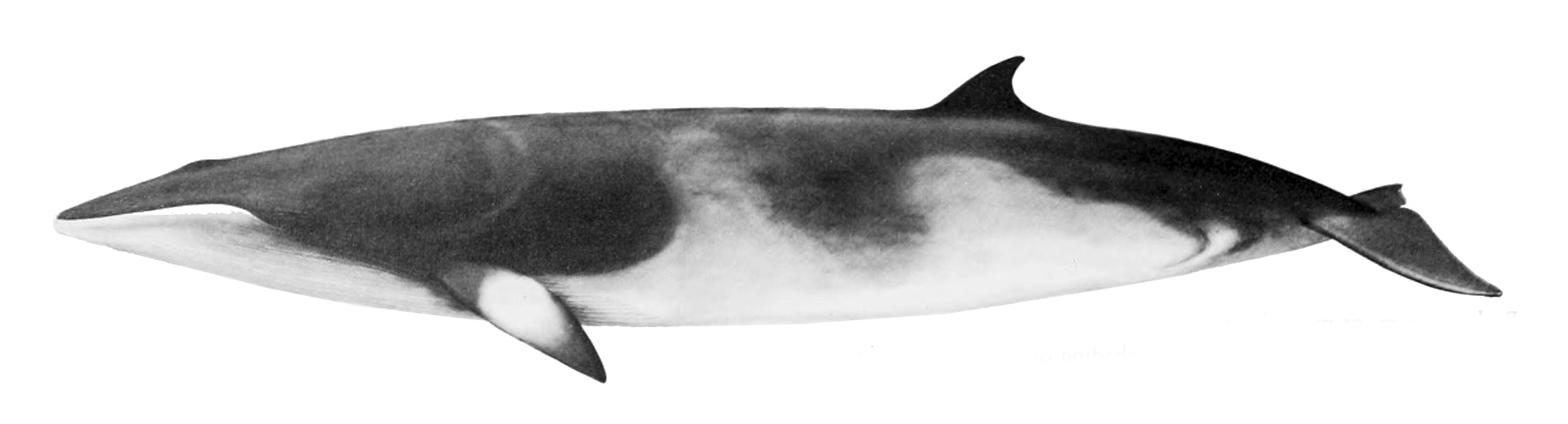
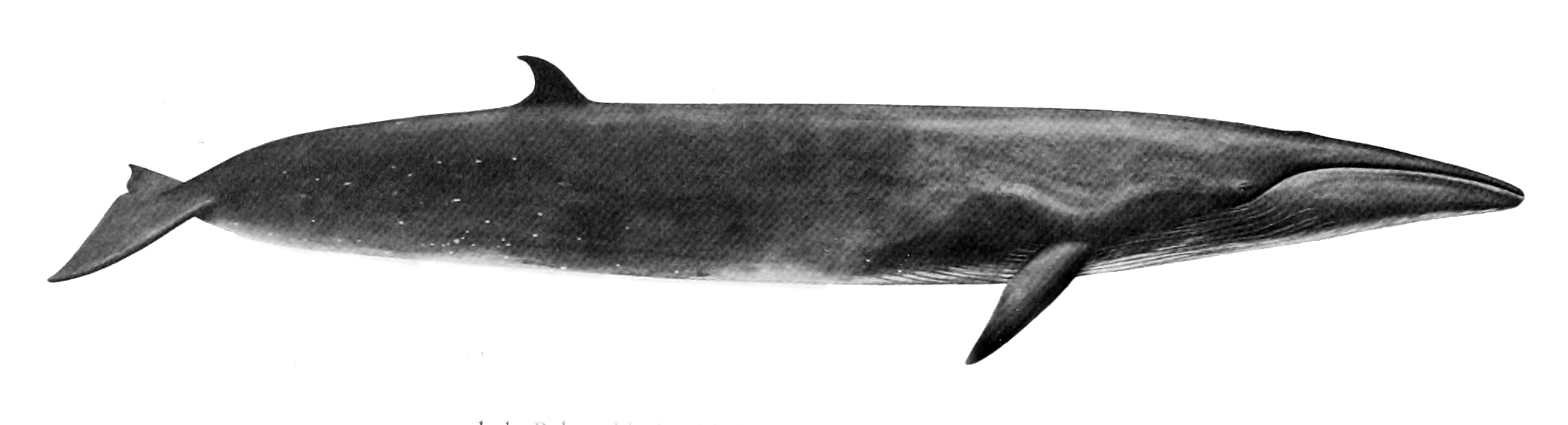
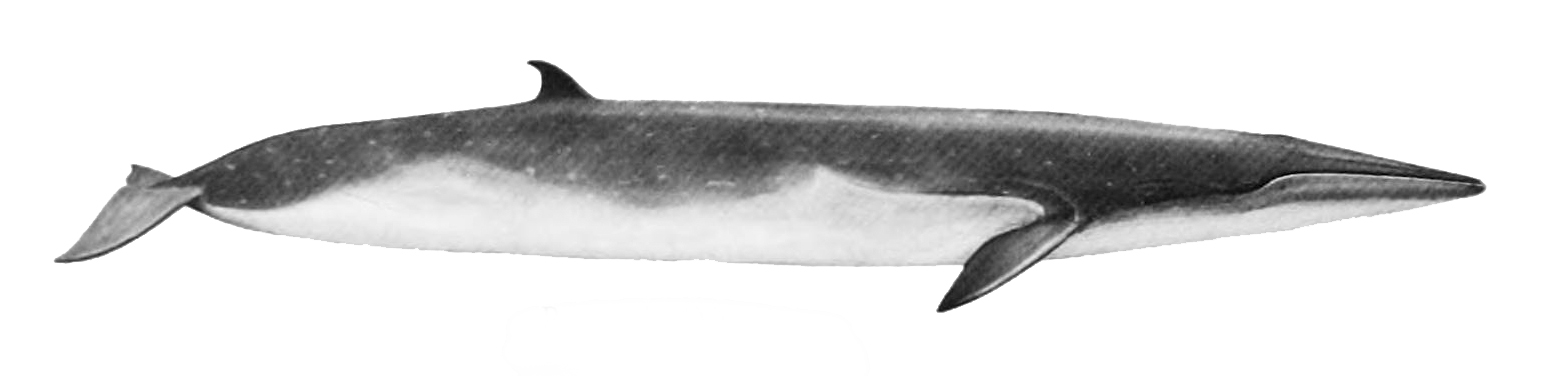
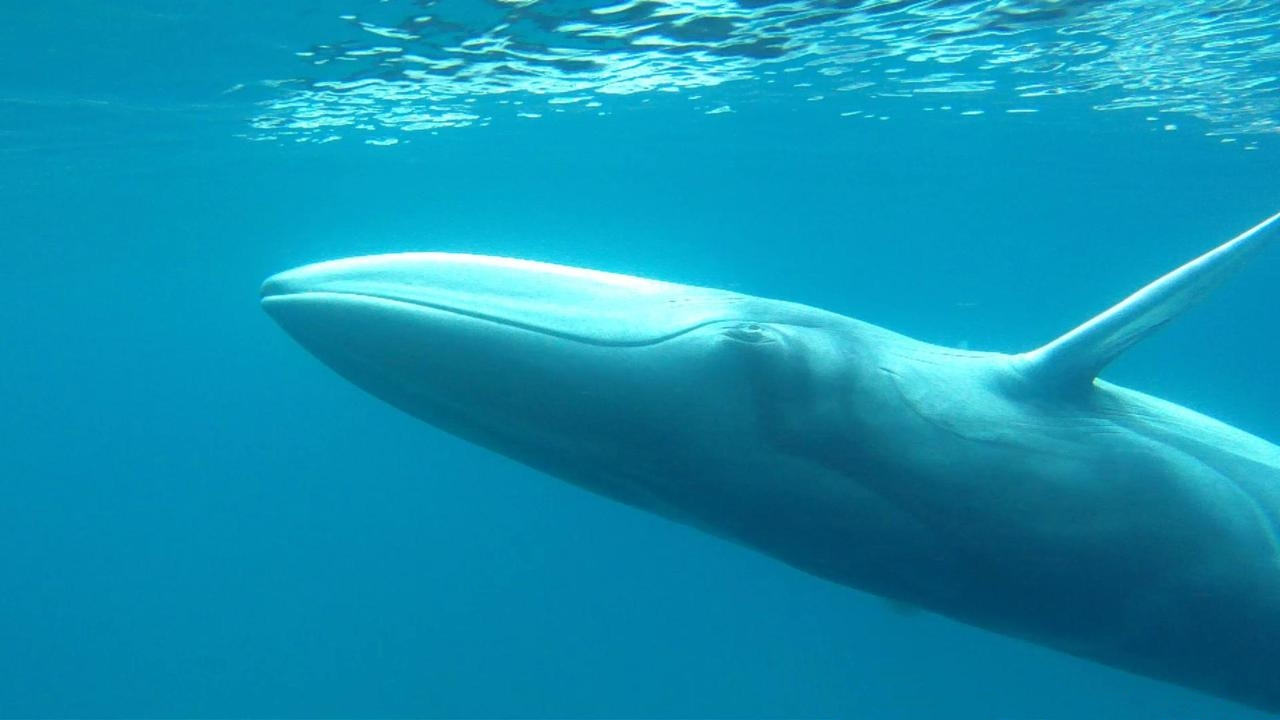
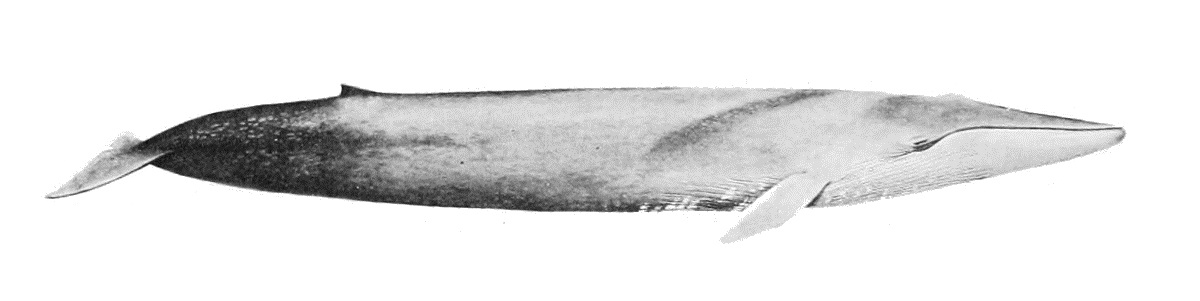
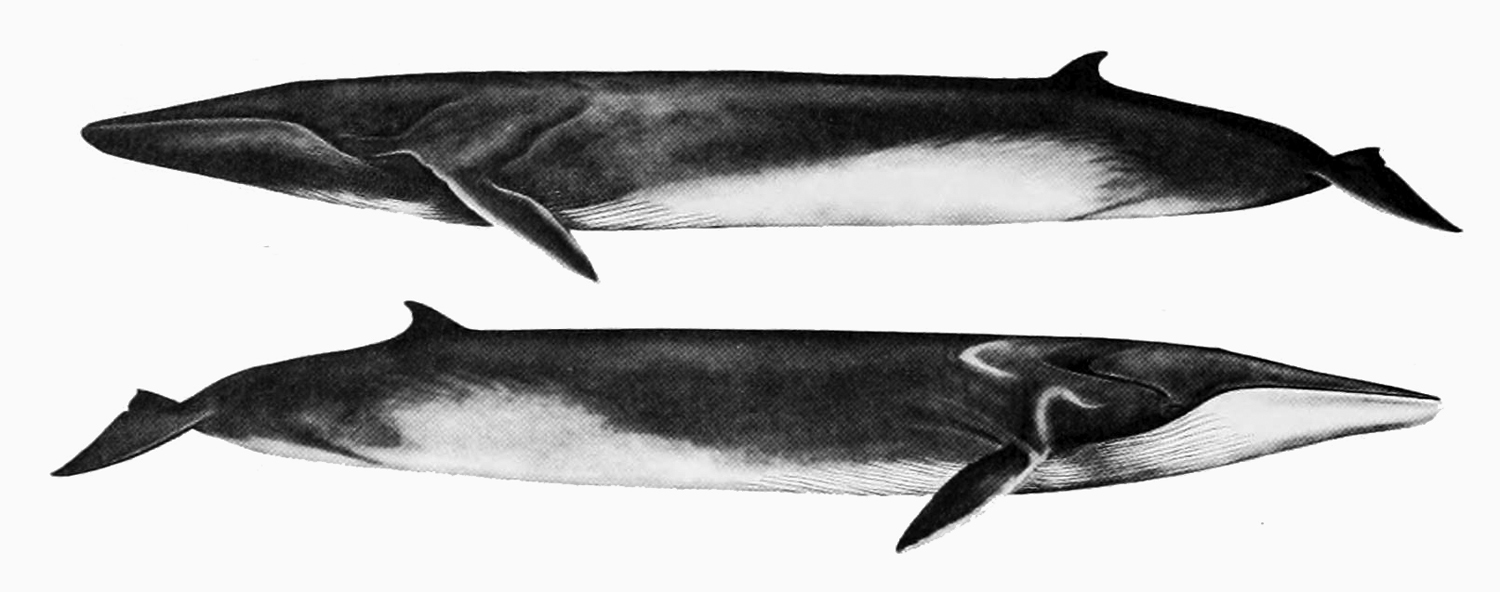
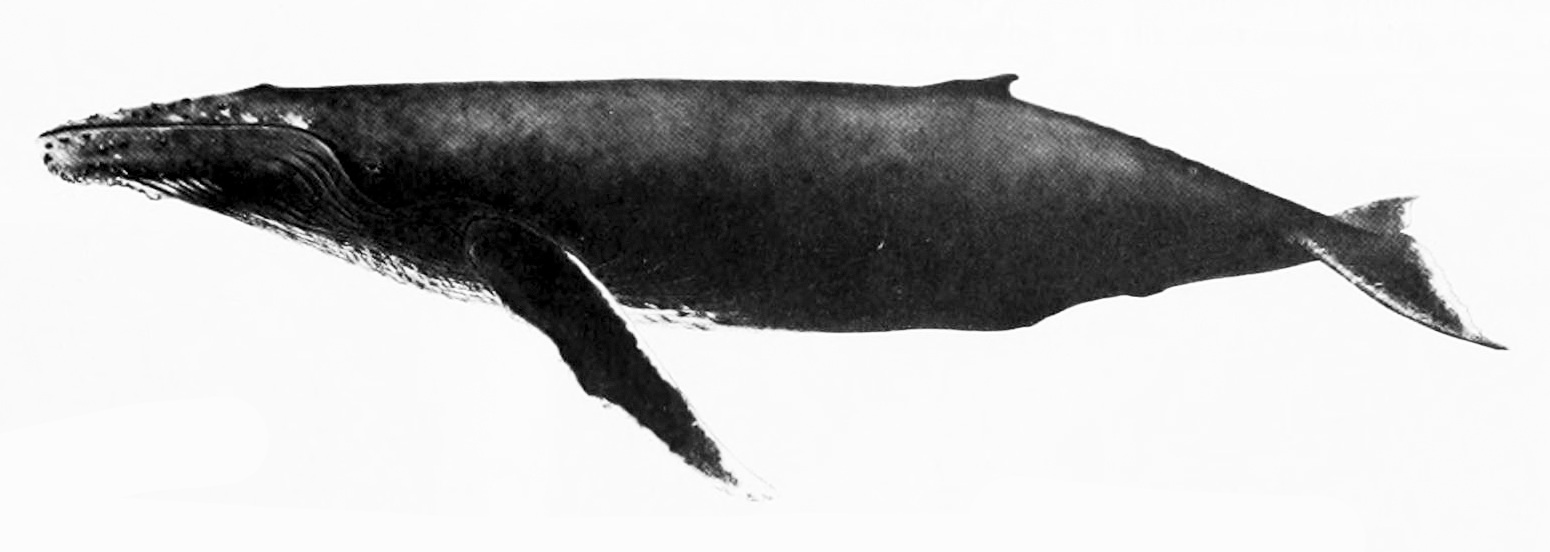
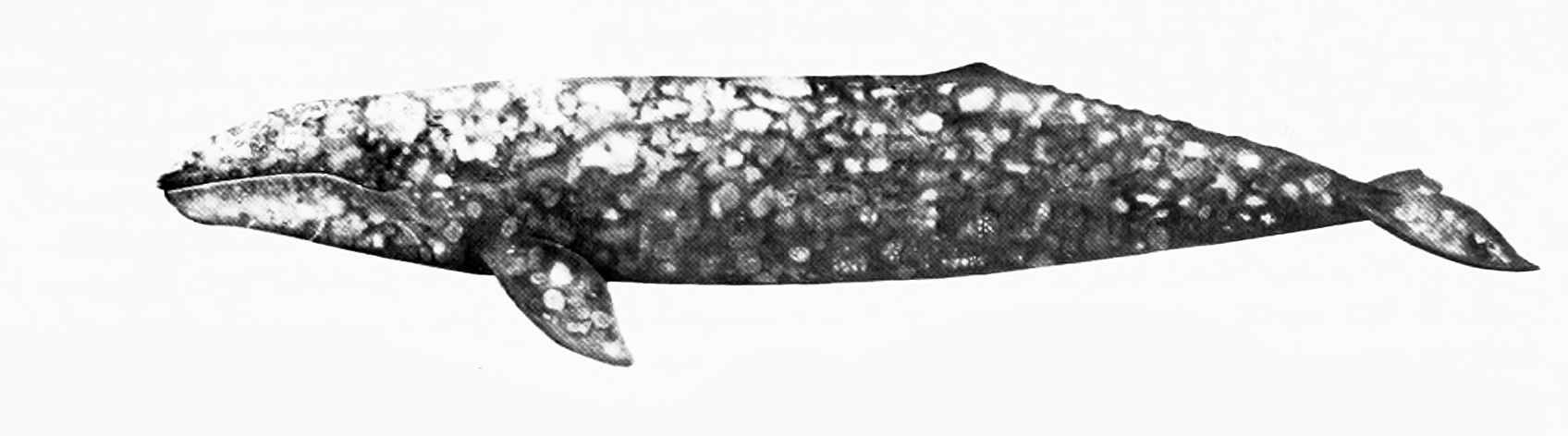
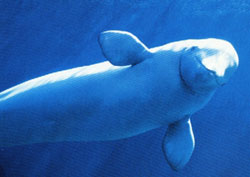
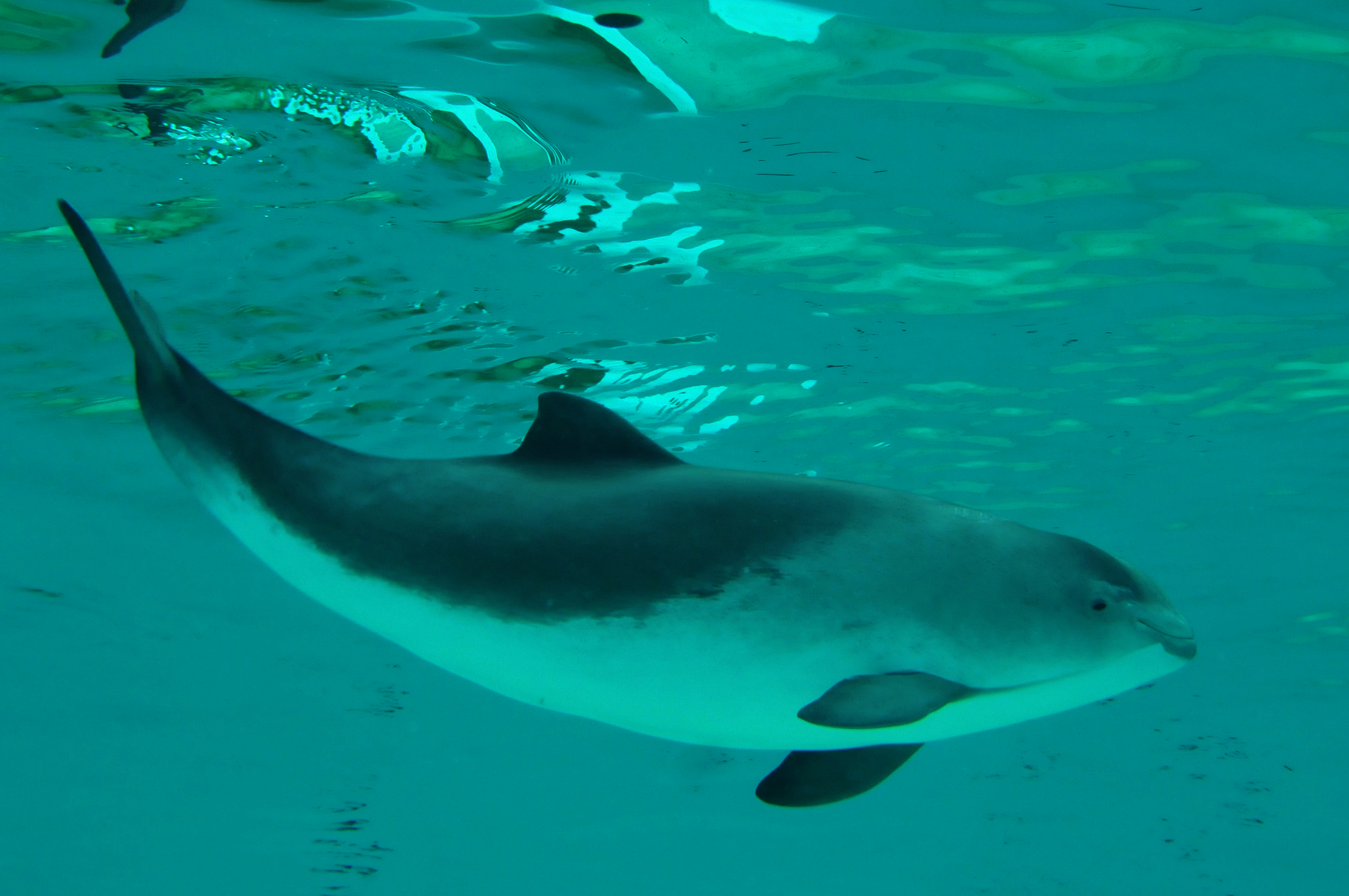
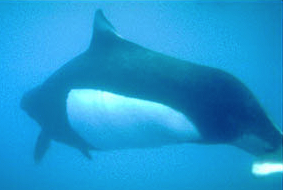
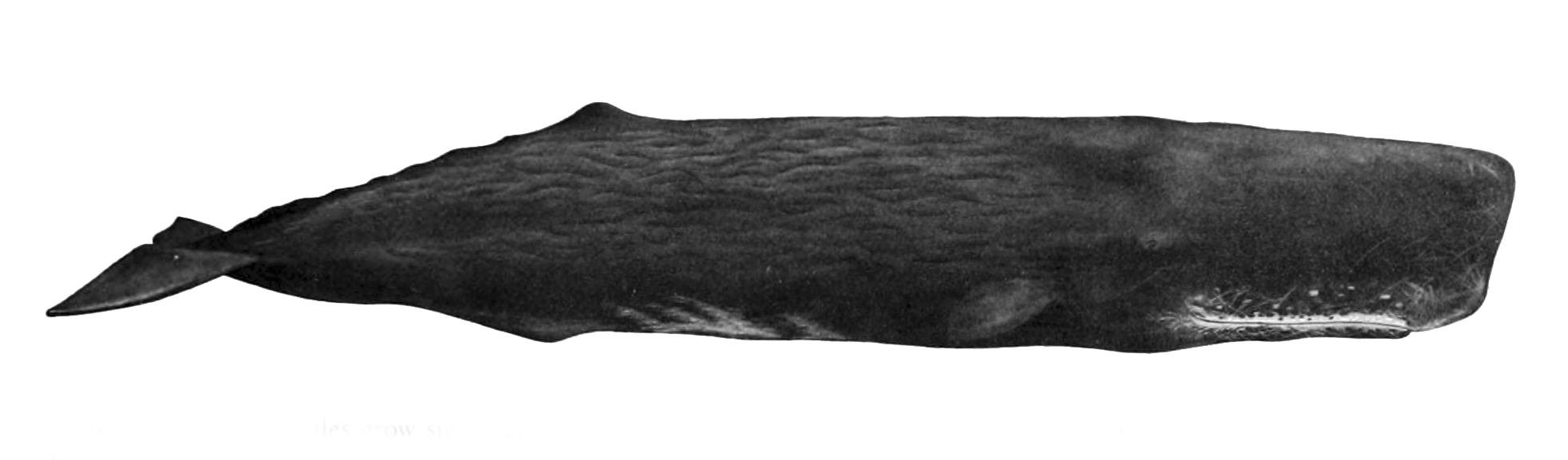
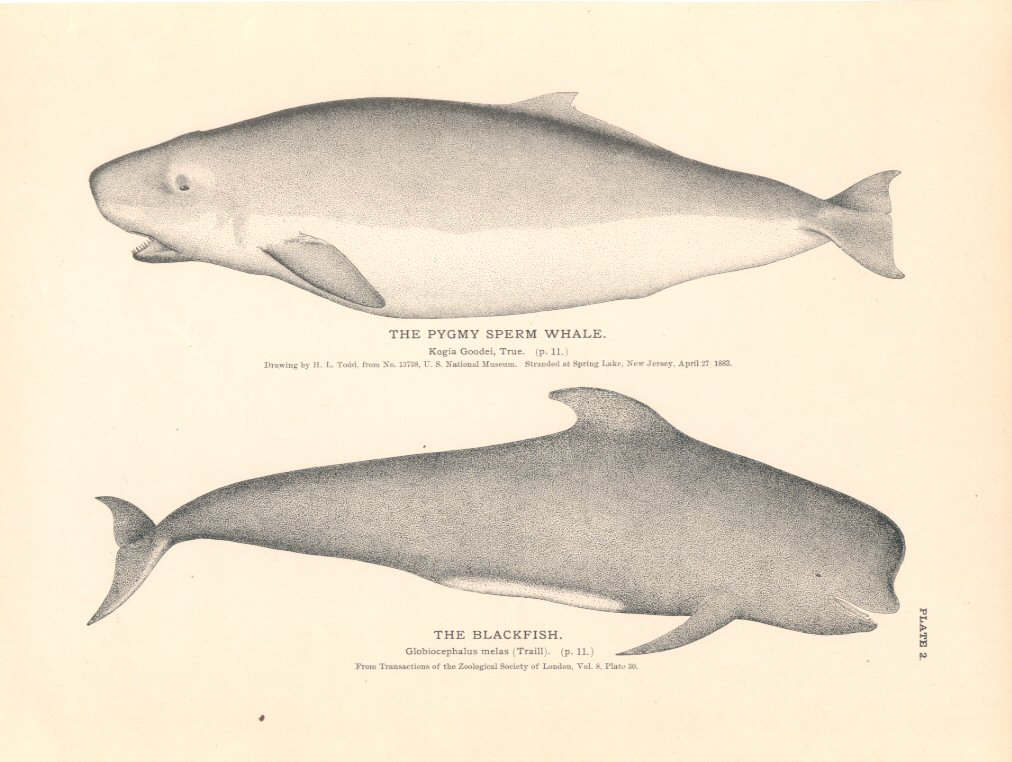
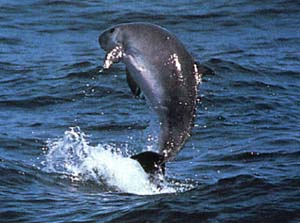
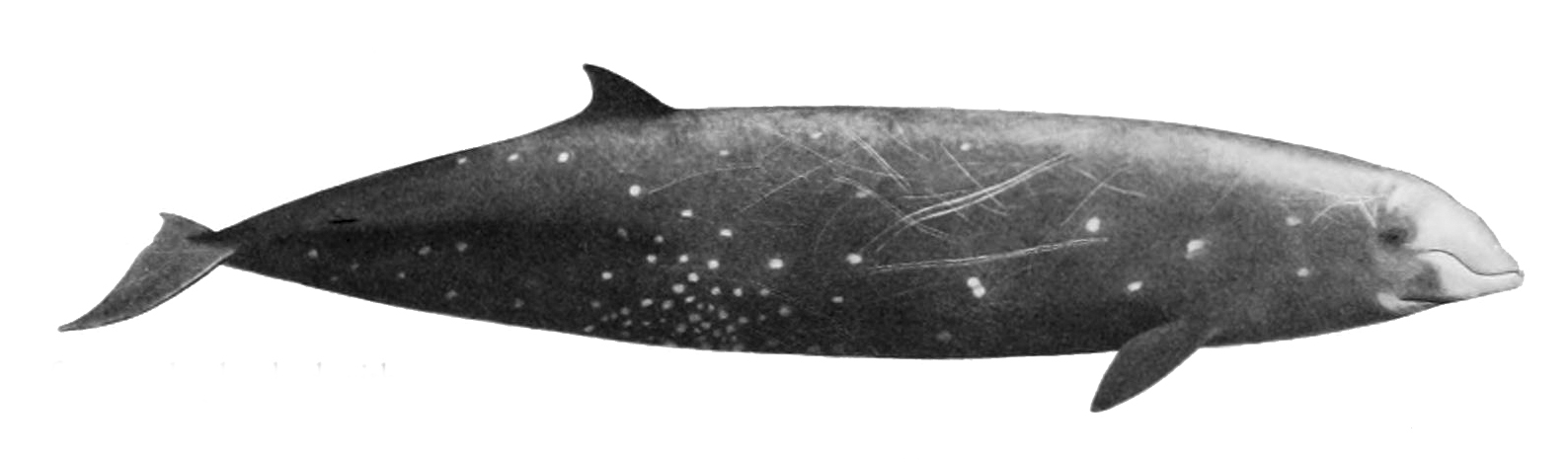
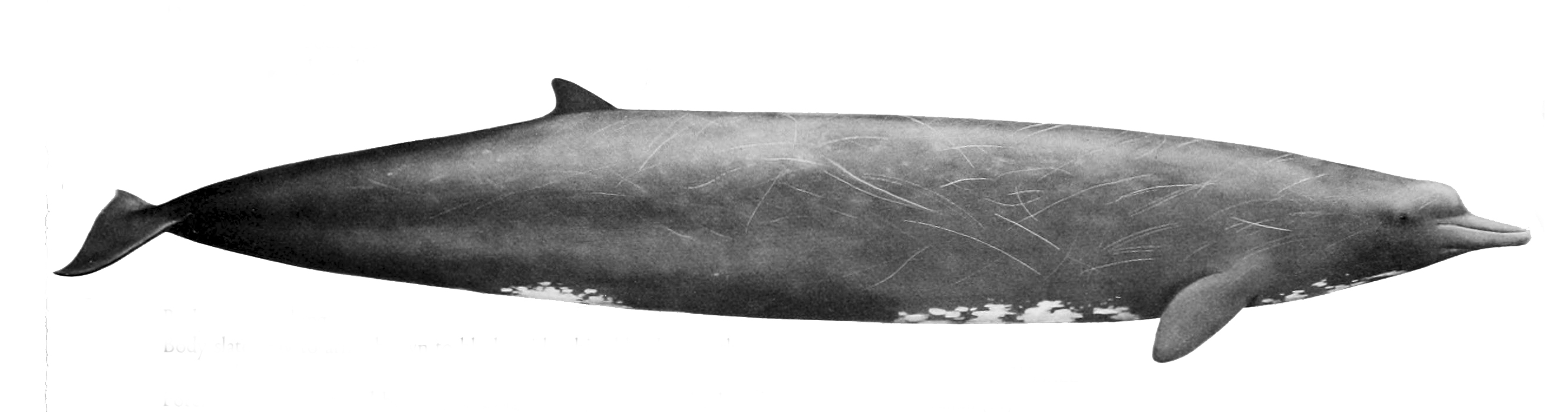
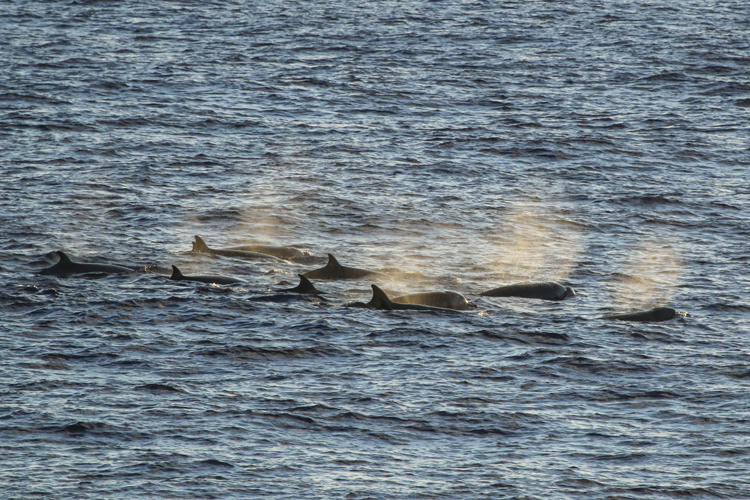
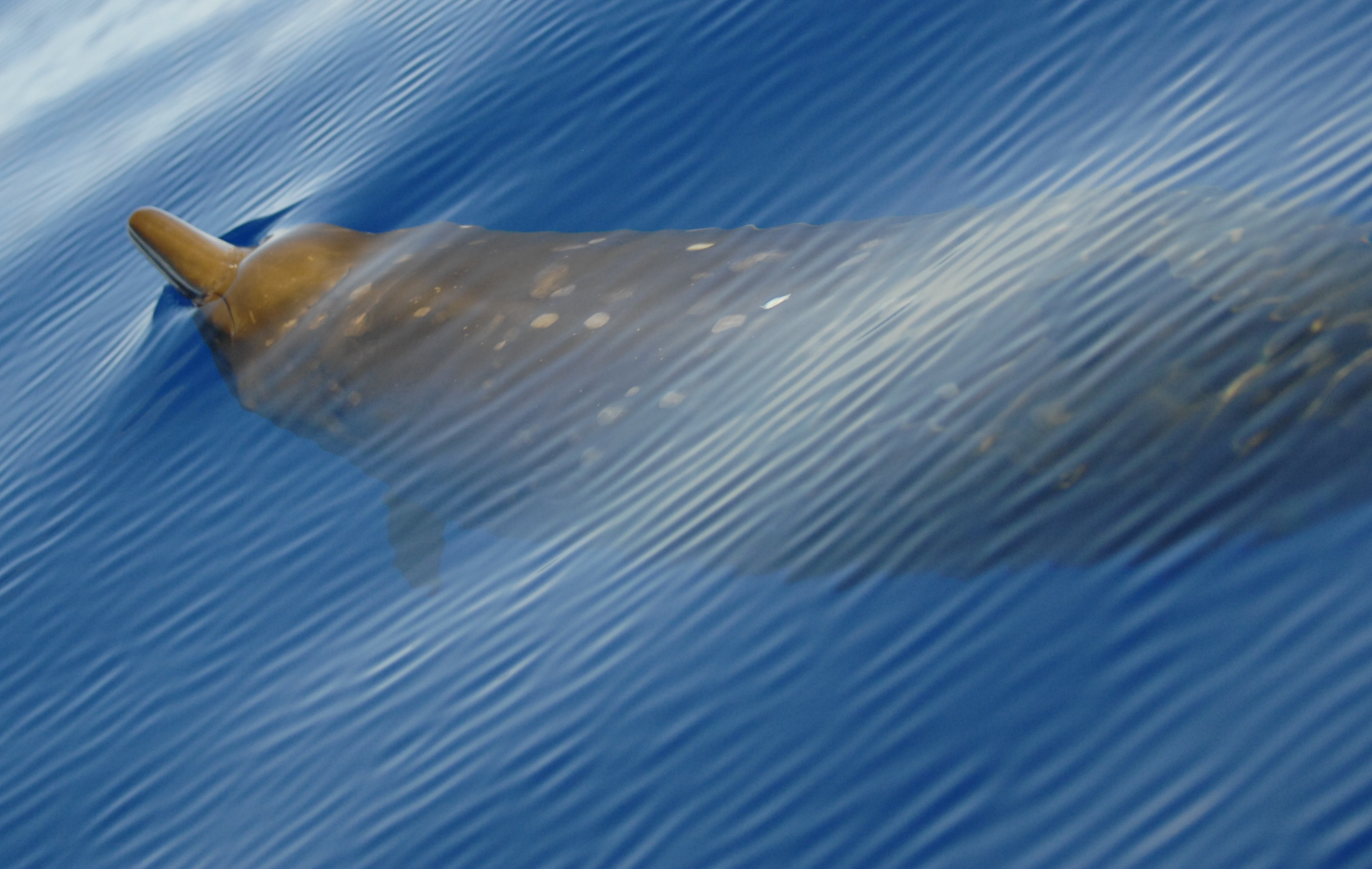
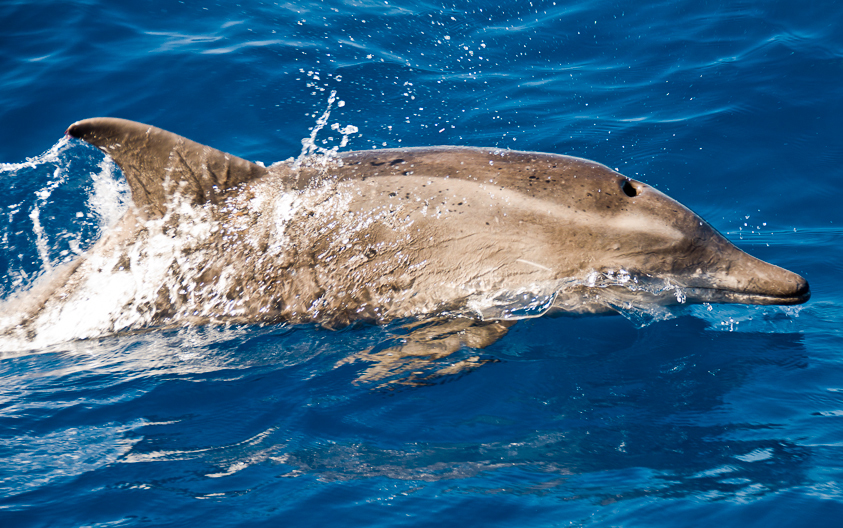
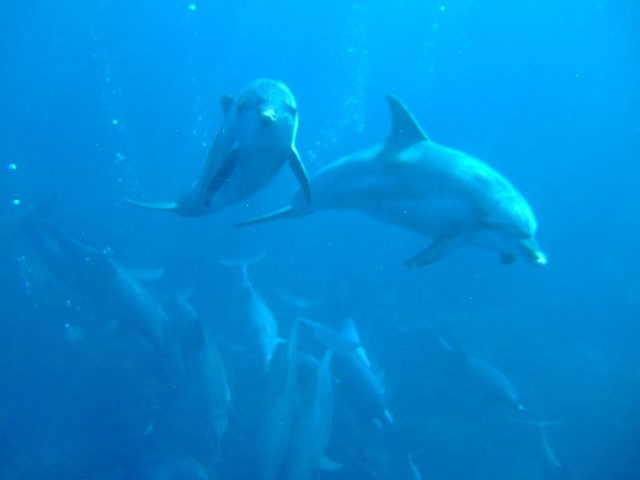
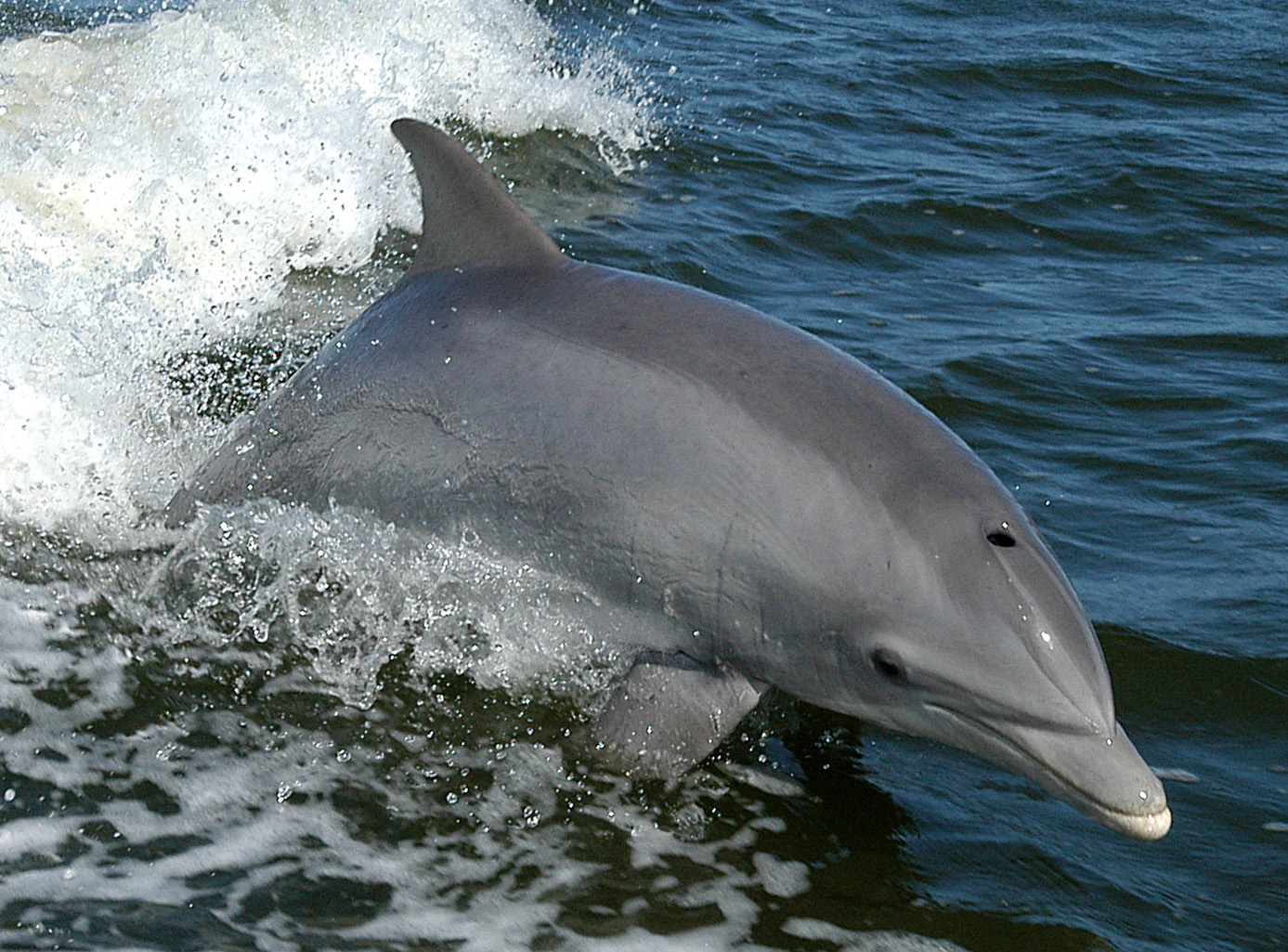
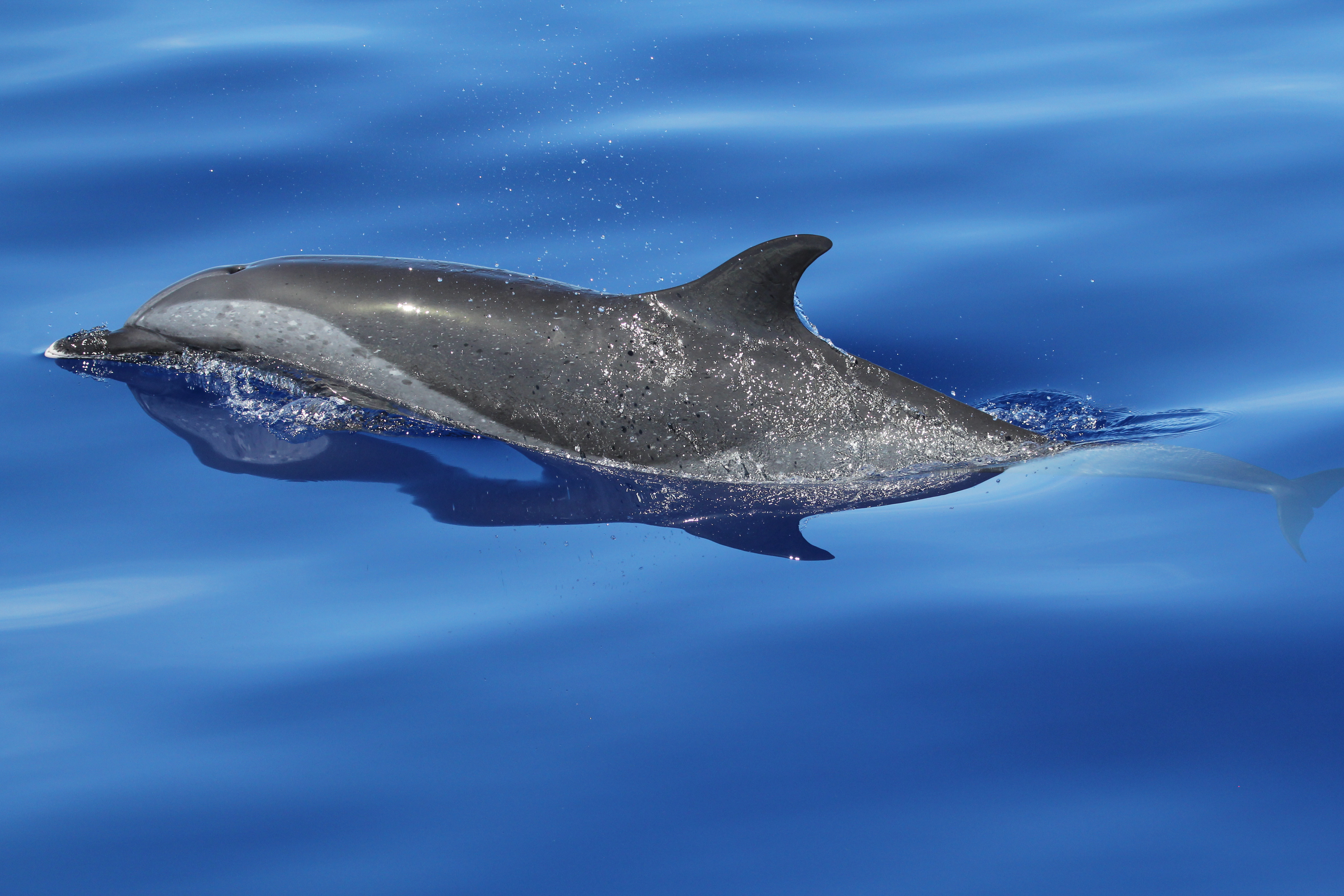
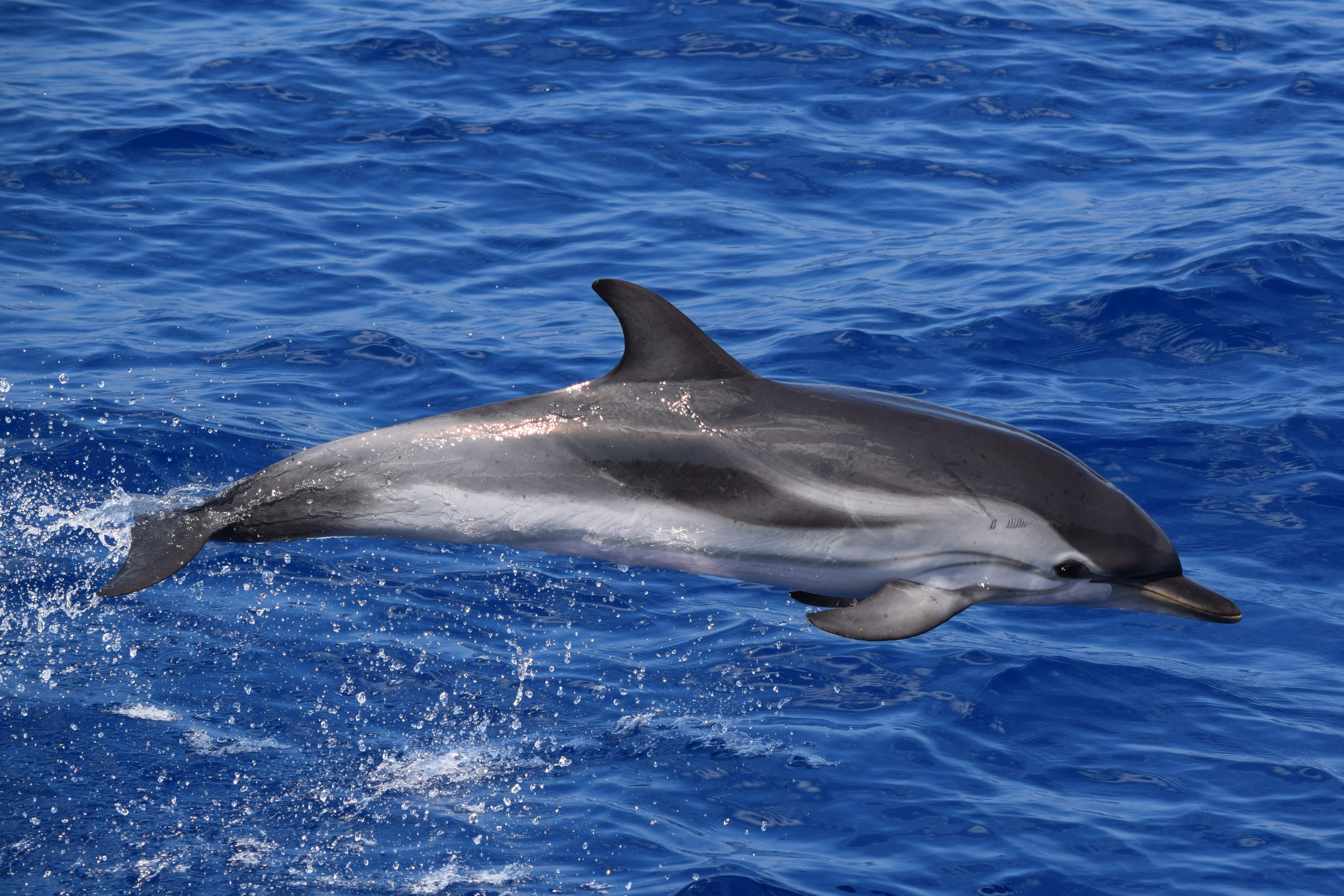
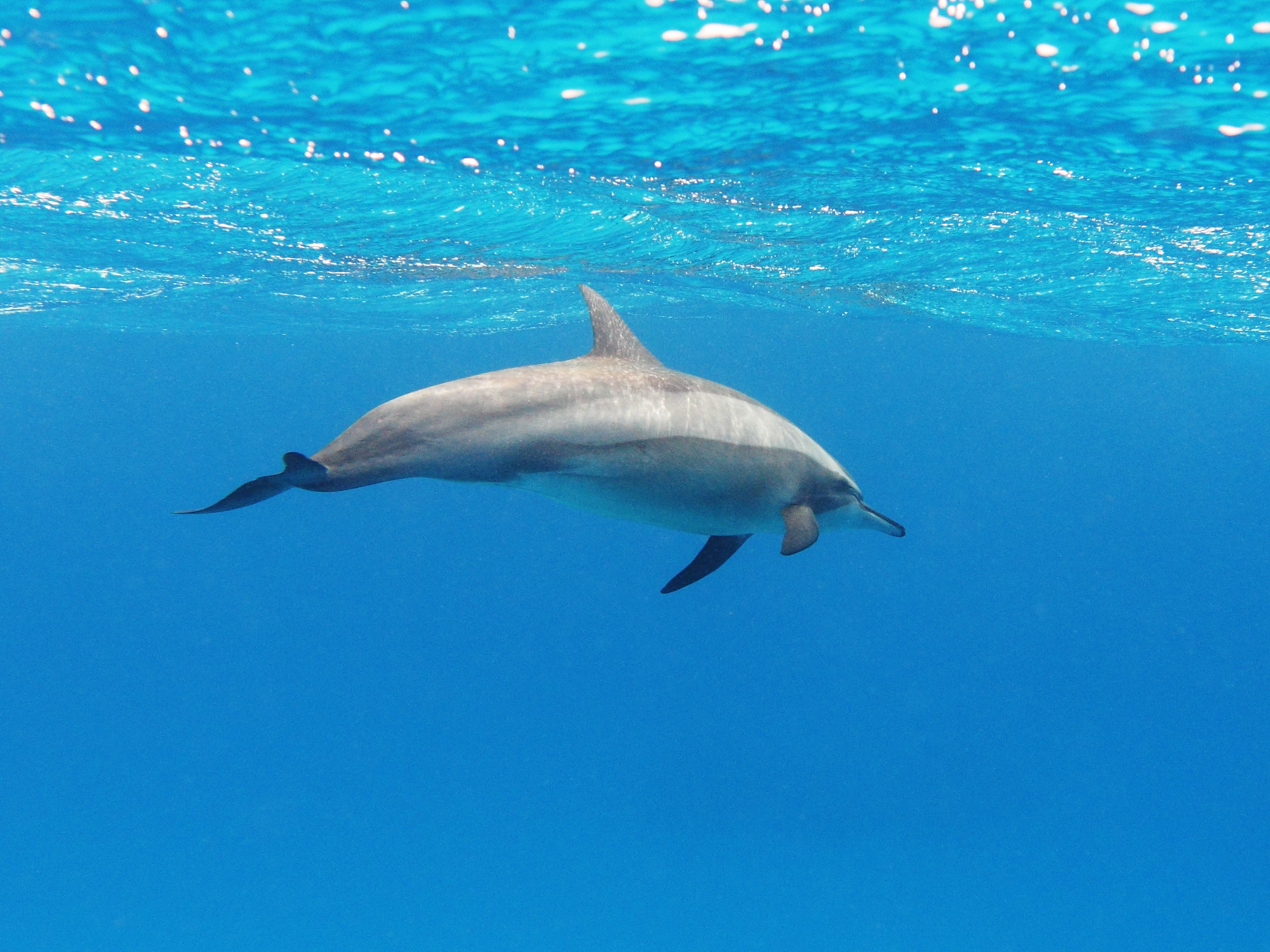
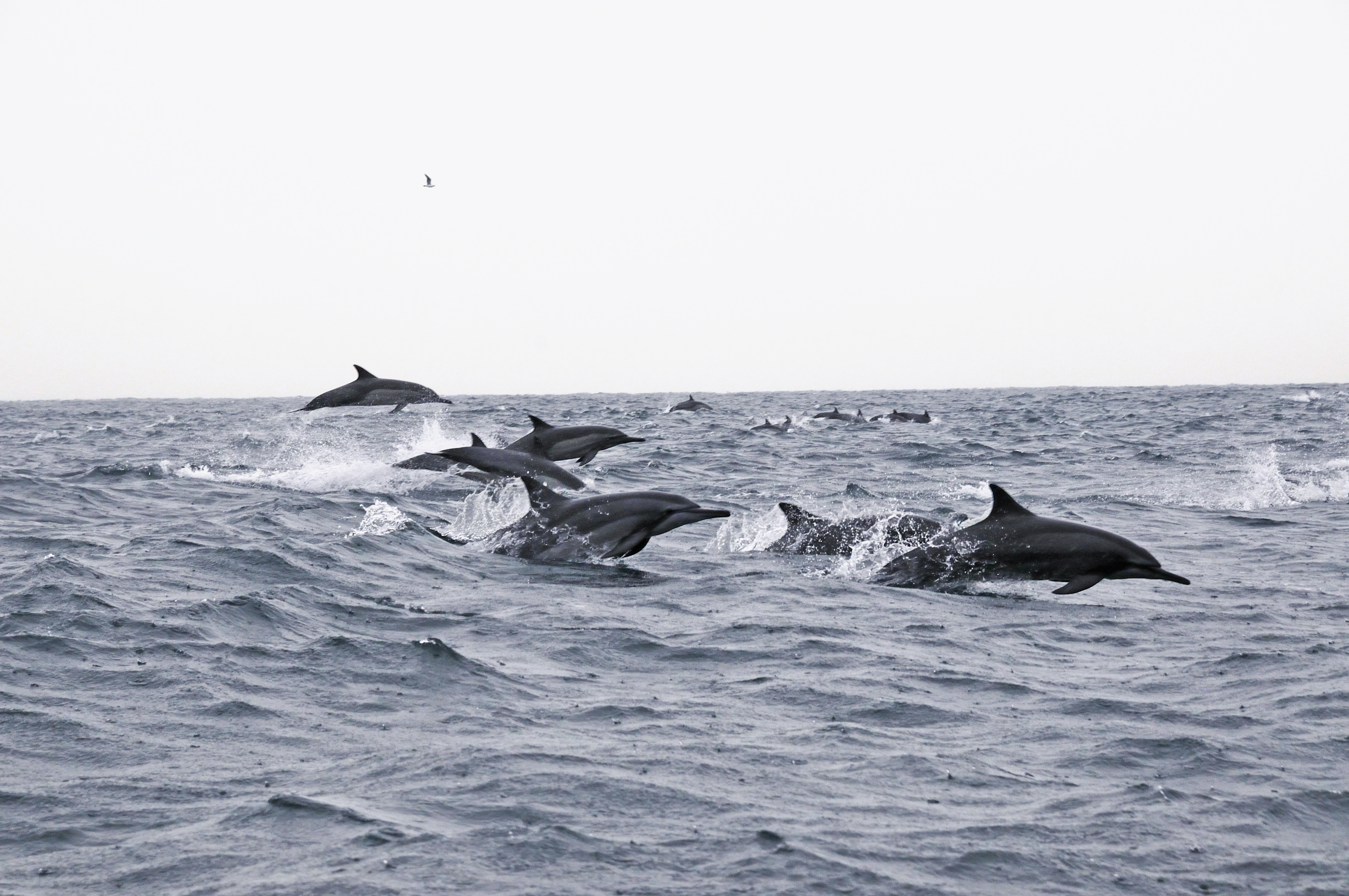
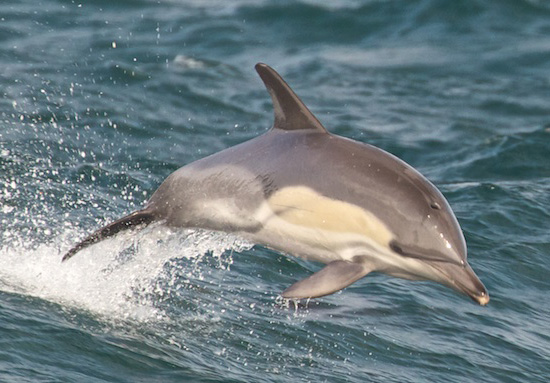
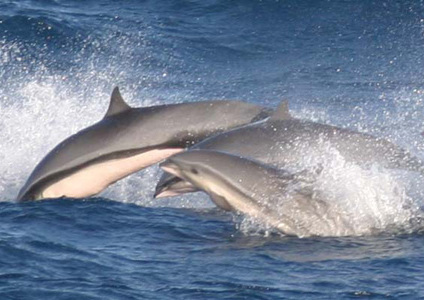
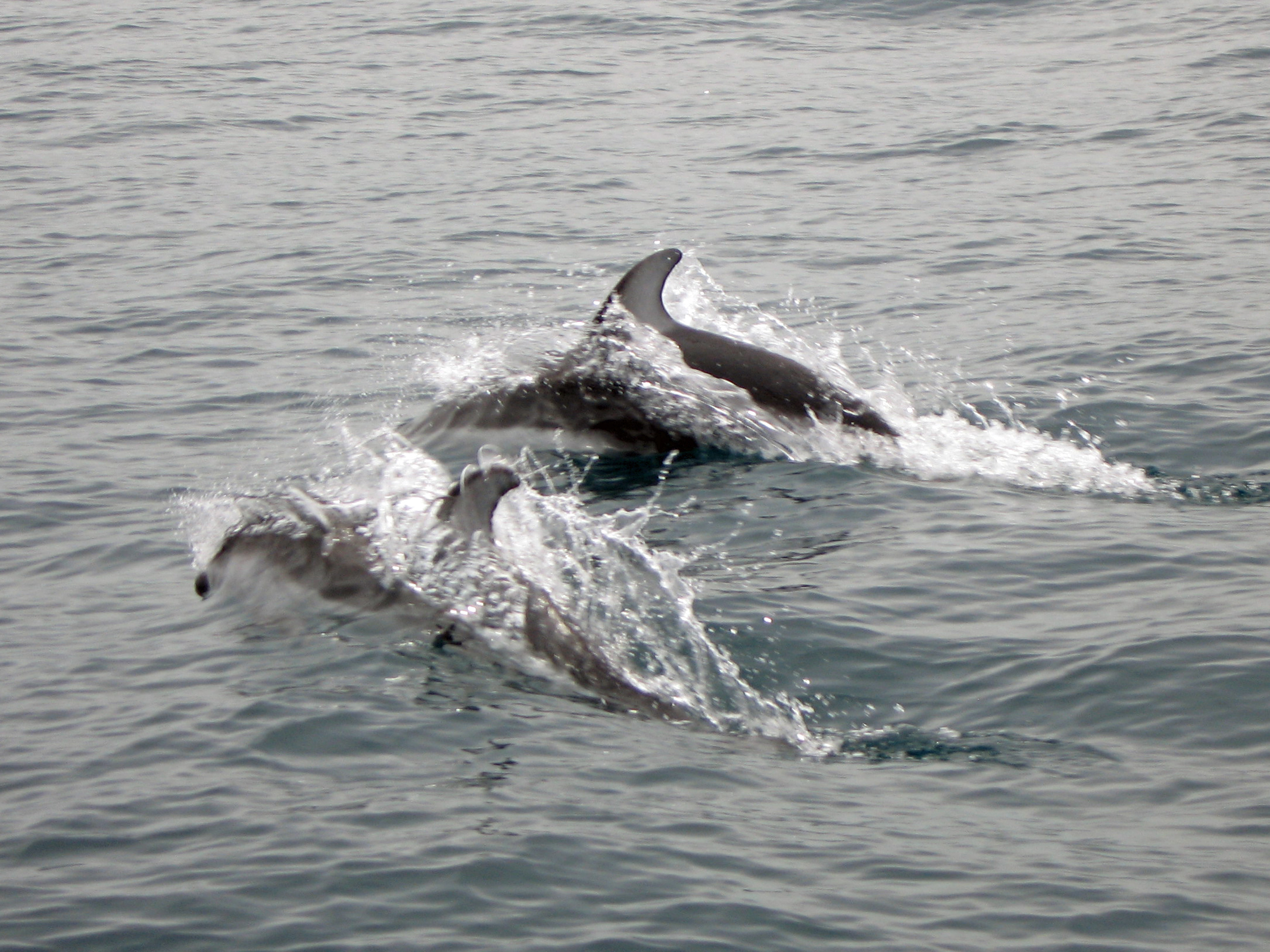
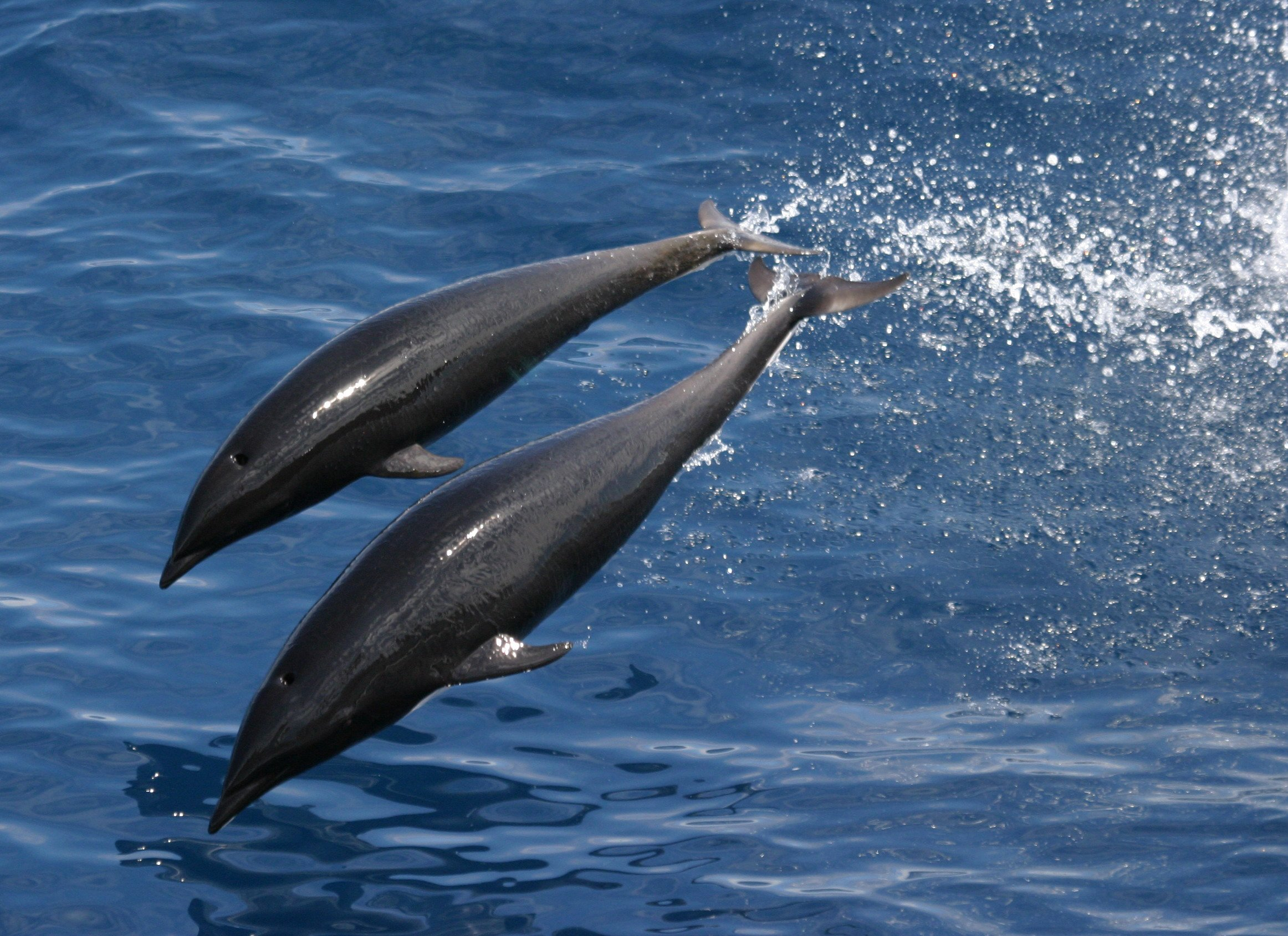
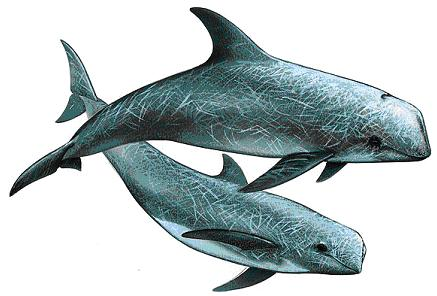
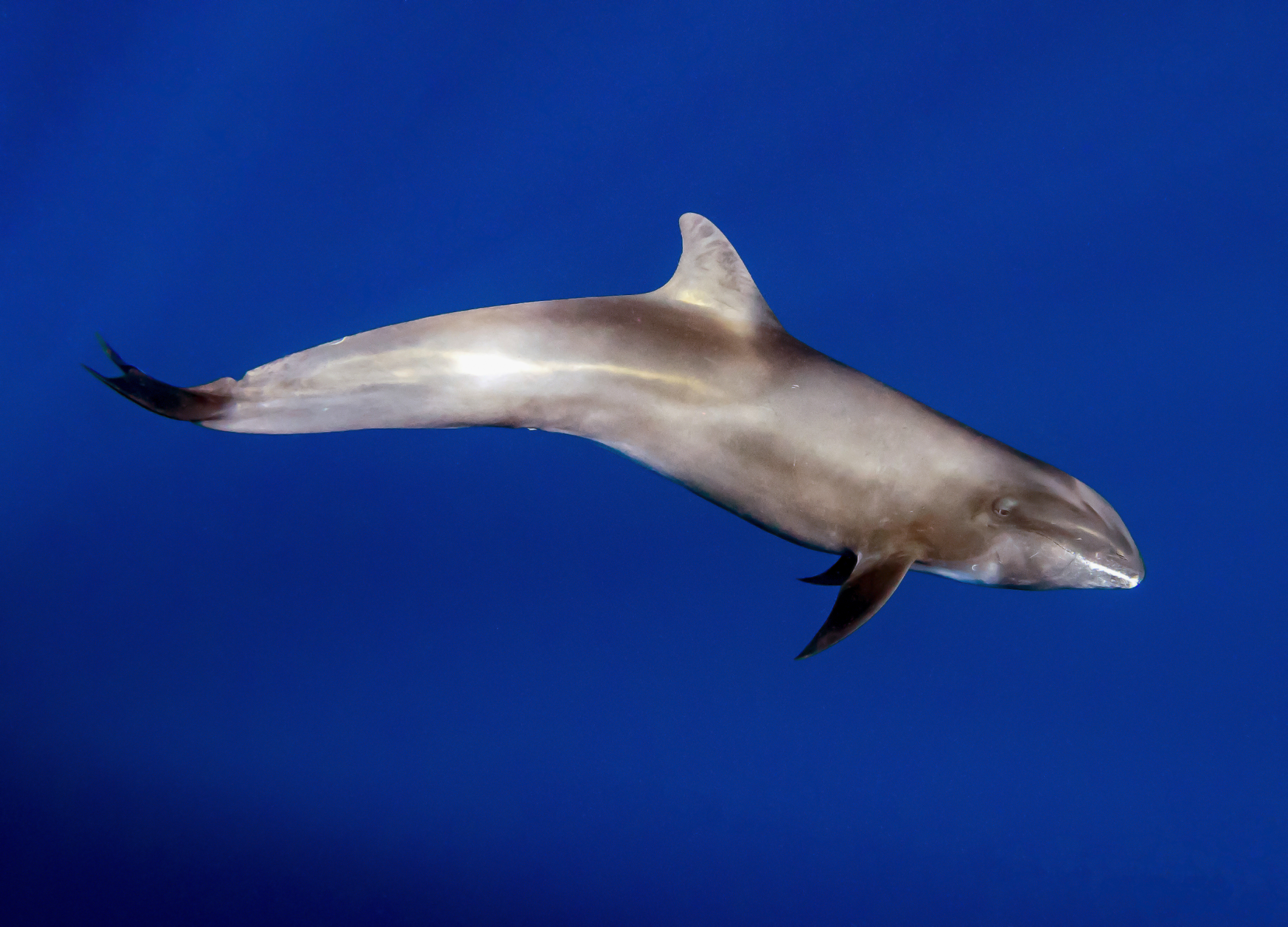
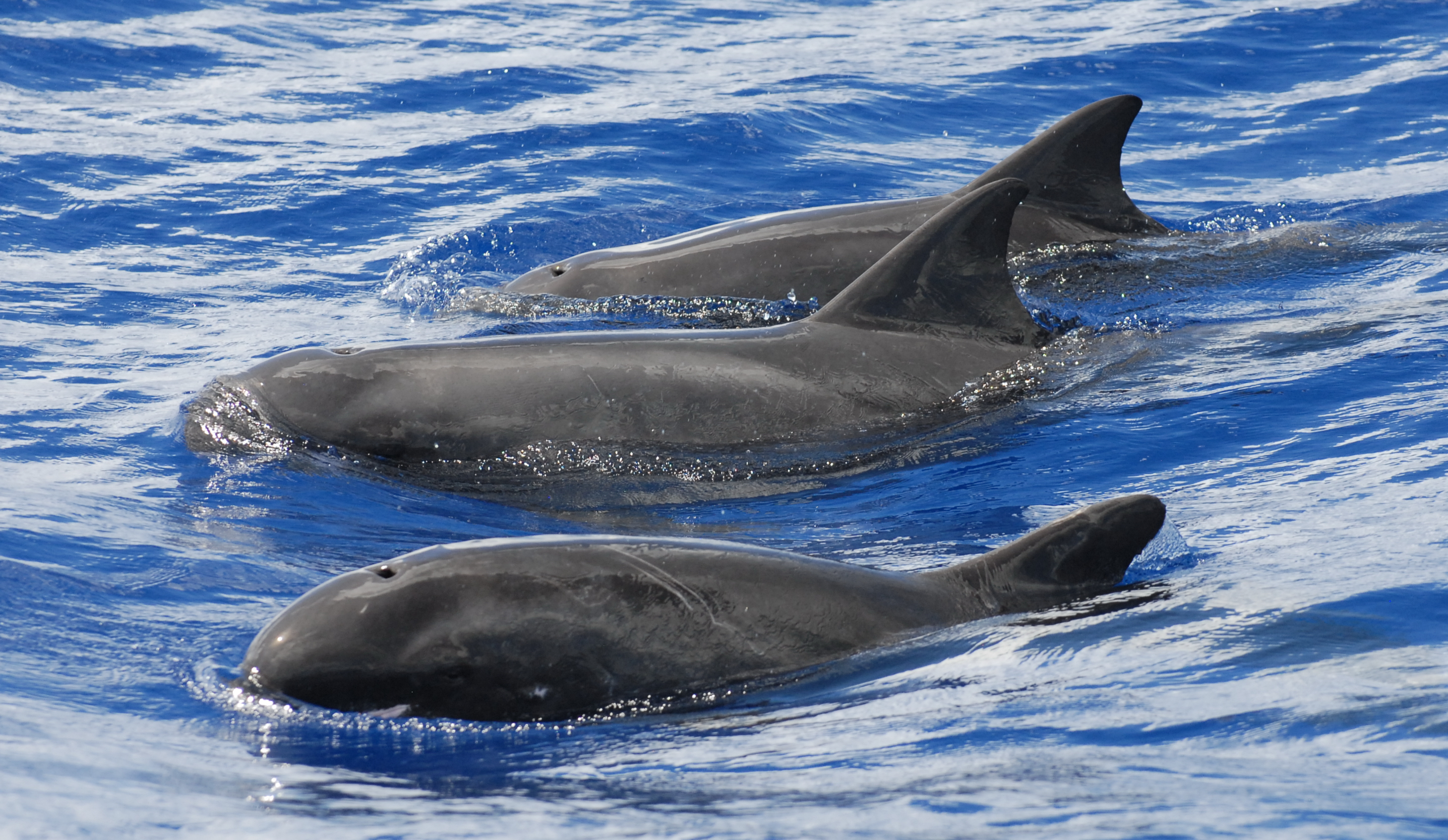
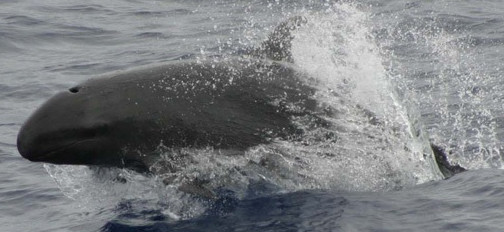
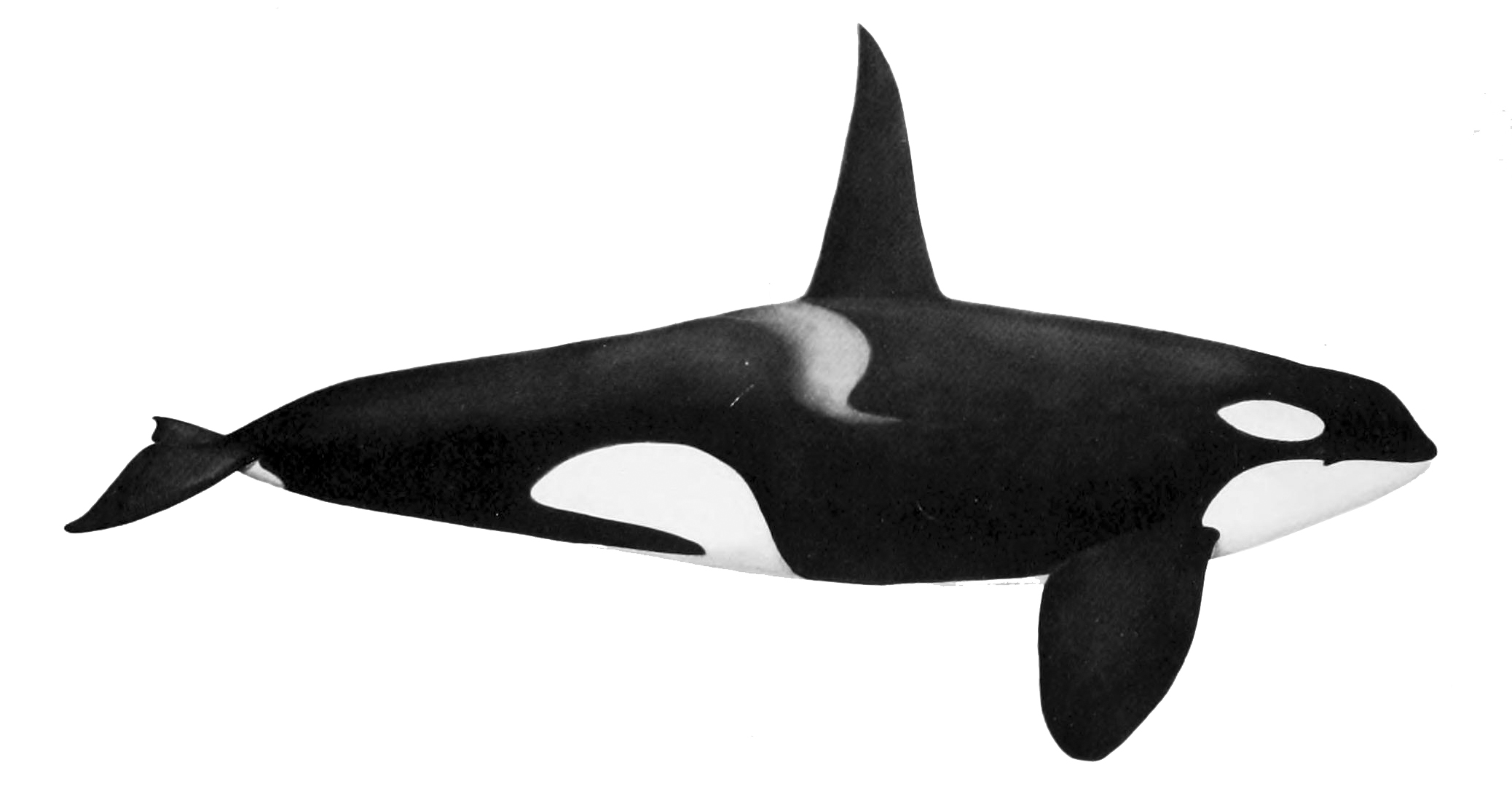
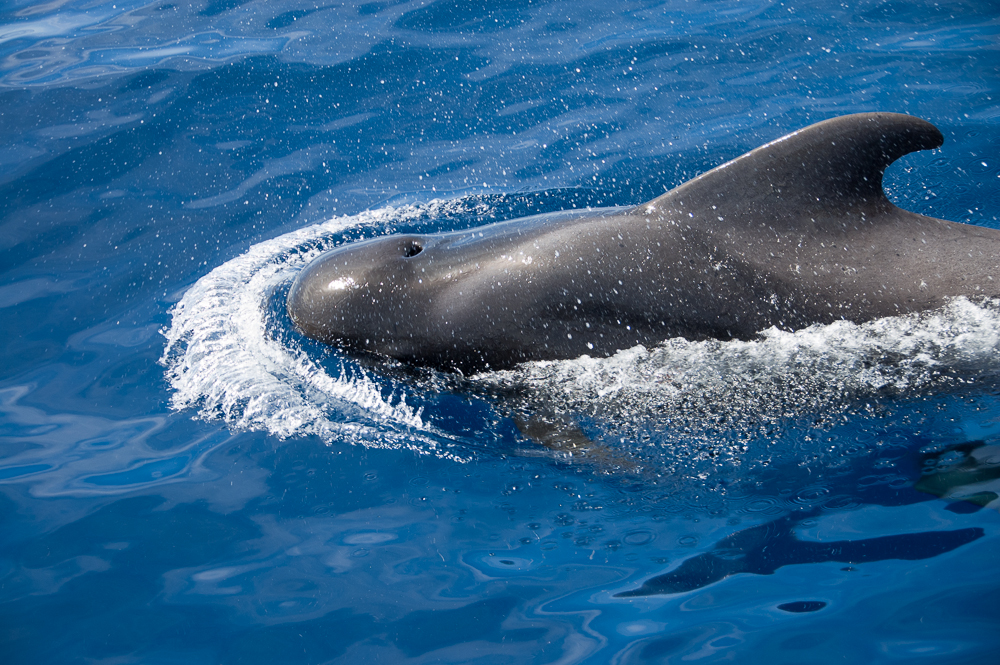
Wild boar (Japanese boar, Ryūkyū boar), Reeves's muntjac, sika deer, Japanese serow, North Pacific right whale, common minke whale, sei whale, Bryde's whale, Omura's whale, blue whale, fin whale, humpback whale, grey whale, beluga whale, harbour porpoise, Dall's porpoise, sperm whale, pygmy sperm whale, dwarf sperm whale, Cuvier's beaked whale, Baird's beaked whale, Indo-Pacific beaked whale, Blainville's beaked whale, rough-toothed dolphin, Indo-Pacific bottlenose dolphin, common bottlenose dolphin, pantropical spotted dolphin, striped dolphin, spinner dolphin, long-beaked common dolphin, short-beaked common dolphin, Fraser's dolphin, Pacific white-sided dolphin, northern right whale dolphin, Risso's dolphin, melon-headed whale, pygmy killer whale, false killer whale, orca, short-finned pilot whale

The even-toed ungulates are ungulates whose weight is borne about equally by the third and fourth toes, rather than mostly or entirely by the third as in perissodactyls. There are about 220 terrestrial artiodactyl species, including many that are of great economic importance to humans. Artiodactyla also includes the infraorder Cetacea, which includes whales, dolphins and porpoises. Cetaceans are the mammals most fully adapted to aquatic life with a spindle-shaped nearly hairless body, protected by a thick layer of blubber, and forelimbs and tail modified to provide propulsion underwater.

- Family: Suidae (pigs)
  - Subfamily: Suinae
      - Genus: Sus
        - Wild boar, Sus scrofa LC^{IUCN}
          - Japanese boar, S. s. leucomystax (Honshū south from Fukushima, Shikoku, Kyūshū, Awaji Island)
          - Ryūkyū boar S. s. riukiuanus (Ryūkyū Islands; half as massive as Sus scrofa leucomystax)
- Family: Cervidae (deer)
  - Subfamily: Cervinae
      - Genus: Muntiacus
        - Reeves's muntjac, Muntiacus reevesi LC^{IUCN} (introduced; southern Chiba and Izu Ōshima)
      - Genus: Rusa
        - Sambar deer, Rusa unicolor VU^{IUCN}
          - Bonin sambar, R. u. boninensis (EX)
      - Genus: Cervus
        - Sika deer, Cervus nippon LC^{IUCN} (widely distributed; Kerama deer and their habitat, and the deer of Nara, are Natural Monuments)
          - Northern Honshu sika deer, C. n. aplodontus
          - Honshu sika deer, C. n. centralis
          - Kerama deer, C. n. keramae
          - Mageshima deer, C. n. mageshimae
          - C. n. nippon
          - Tsushima deer, C. n. pulchellus
          - Yakushima deer, C. n. yakushimae
          - Yezo sika deer, C. n. yesoensis
- Family: Bovidae (cattle, antelope, sheep, goats)
  - Subfamily: Caprinae
      - Genus: Capricornis
        - Japanese serow, Capricornis crispus LC^{IUCN} (endemic; Honshū, Shikoku, Kyūshū; Special Natural Monument)
- Infraorder: Cetacea
  - Parvorder: Mysticeti
    - Family: Balaenidae
      - Genus: Eubalaena
        - North Pacific right whale, Eubalaena japonica EN^{IUCN}
    - Family: Balaenopteridae
      - Subfamily: Balaenopterinae
        - Genus: Balaenoptera
          - Common minke whale, Balaenoptera acutorostrata LC^{IUCN}
          - Sei whale, Balaenoptera borealis EN^{IUCN}
          - Bryde's whale, Balaenoptera edeni LC^{IUCN}
          - Omura's whale, Balaenoptera omurai DD^{IUCN}
          - Blue whale, Balaenoptera musculus EN^{IUCN} (no recent records in neighbouring waters)
          - Fin whale, Balaenoptera physalus VU^{IUCN}
      - Subfamily: Megapterinae
        - Genus: Megaptera
          - Humpback whale, Megaptera novaeangliae LC^{IUCN} (regular sightings in the Ogasawara Islands and Okinawa)
    - Family: Eschrichtiidae
      - Genus: Eschrichtius
        - Grey whale, Eschrichtius robustus LC^{IUCN} (occasional sightings of western subpopulation EN^{IUCN})
  - Parvorder: Odontoceti
    - Superfamily: Platanistoidea
      - Family: Monodontidae
        - Genus: Delphinapterus
          - Beluga, Delphinapterus leucas LC^{IUCN} vagrant
        - Family: Phocoenidae
        - Genus: Neophocaena
          - Narrow-ridged finless porpoise, Neophocaena asiaeorientalis EN^{IUCN}
        - Genus: Phocoena
          - Harbour porpoise, Phocoena phocoena LC^{IUCN}
        - Genus: Phocoenoides
          - Dall's porpoise, Phocoenoides dalli LC^{IUCN}
        - Family: Physeteridae
        - Genus: Physeter
          - Sperm whale, Physeter macrocephalus VU^{IUCN}
      - Family: Kogiidae
        - Genus: Kogia
          - Pygmy sperm whale, Kogia breviceps LC^{IUCN}
          - Dwarf sperm whale, Kogia sima LC^{IUCN}
      - Family: Ziphidae
        - Genus: Ziphius
          - Cuvier's beaked whale, Ziphius cavirostris LC^{IUCN}
        - Genus: Berardius
          - Baird's beaked whale, Berardius bairdii LC^{IUCN}
          - Sato's beaked whale, Berardius minimus NT^{IUCN}
        - Subfamily: Hyperoodontinae
          - Genus: Indopacetus
            - Indo-Pacific beaked whale, Indopacetus pacificus LC^{IUCN}
          - Genus: Mesoplodon
            - Hubbs' beaked whale, Mesoplodon carlhubbsi DD^{IUCN}
            - Blainville's beaked whale, Mesoplodon densirostris LC^{IUCN}*
            - Ginkgo-toothed beaked whale, Mesoplodon ginkgodens DD^{IUCN}
            - Stejneger's beaked whale, Mesoplodon stejnegeri NT^{IUCN}
      - Family: Delphinidae (marine dolphins)
        - Genus: Steno
          - Rough-toothed dolphin, Steno bredanensis LC^{IUCN}
        - Genus: Tursiops
          - Indo-Pacific bottlenose dolphin, Tursiops aduncus NT^{IUCN}
          - Common bottlenose dolphin, Tursiops truncatus LC^{IUCN}
        - Genus: Stenella
          - Pantropical spotted dolphin, Stenella attenuata LC^{IUCN}
          - Striped dolphin, Stenella coeruleoalba LC^{IUCN}
          - Spinner dolphin, Stenella longirostris LC^{IUCN} (common around the Ogasawara Islands)
        - Genus: Delphinus
          - Long-beaked common dolphin, Delphinus capensis LC^{IUCN}
          - Short-beaked common dolphin, Delphinus delphis LC^{IUCN}
        - Genus: Lagenodelphis
          - Fraser's dolphin, Lagenodelphis hosei LC^{IUCN}
        - Genus: Sagmatias
          - Pacific white-sided dolphin, Sagmatias obliquidens LC^{IUCN}
        - Genus: Lissodelphis
          - Northern right whale dolphin, Lissodelphis borealis LC^{IUCN}
        - Genus: Grampus
          - Risso's dolphin, Grampus griseus LC^{IUCN}
        - Genus: Peponocephala
          - Melon-headed whale, Peponocephala electra LC^{IUCN}
        - Genus: Feresa
          - Pygmy killer whale, Feresa attenuata LC^{IUCN}
        - Genus: Pseudorca
          - False killer whale, Pseudorca crassidens NT^{IUCN}
        - Genus: Orcinus
          - Orca, Orcinus orca DD^{IUCN}
        - Genus: Globicephala
          - Short-finned pilot whale, Globicephala macrorhynchus LC^{IUCN}

== See also ==
- List of animals of Japan
- Wildlife of Japan
- List of chordate orders
- Lists of mammals by region
- List of prehistoric mammals
- Mammal classification
- List of mammals described in the 2000s
