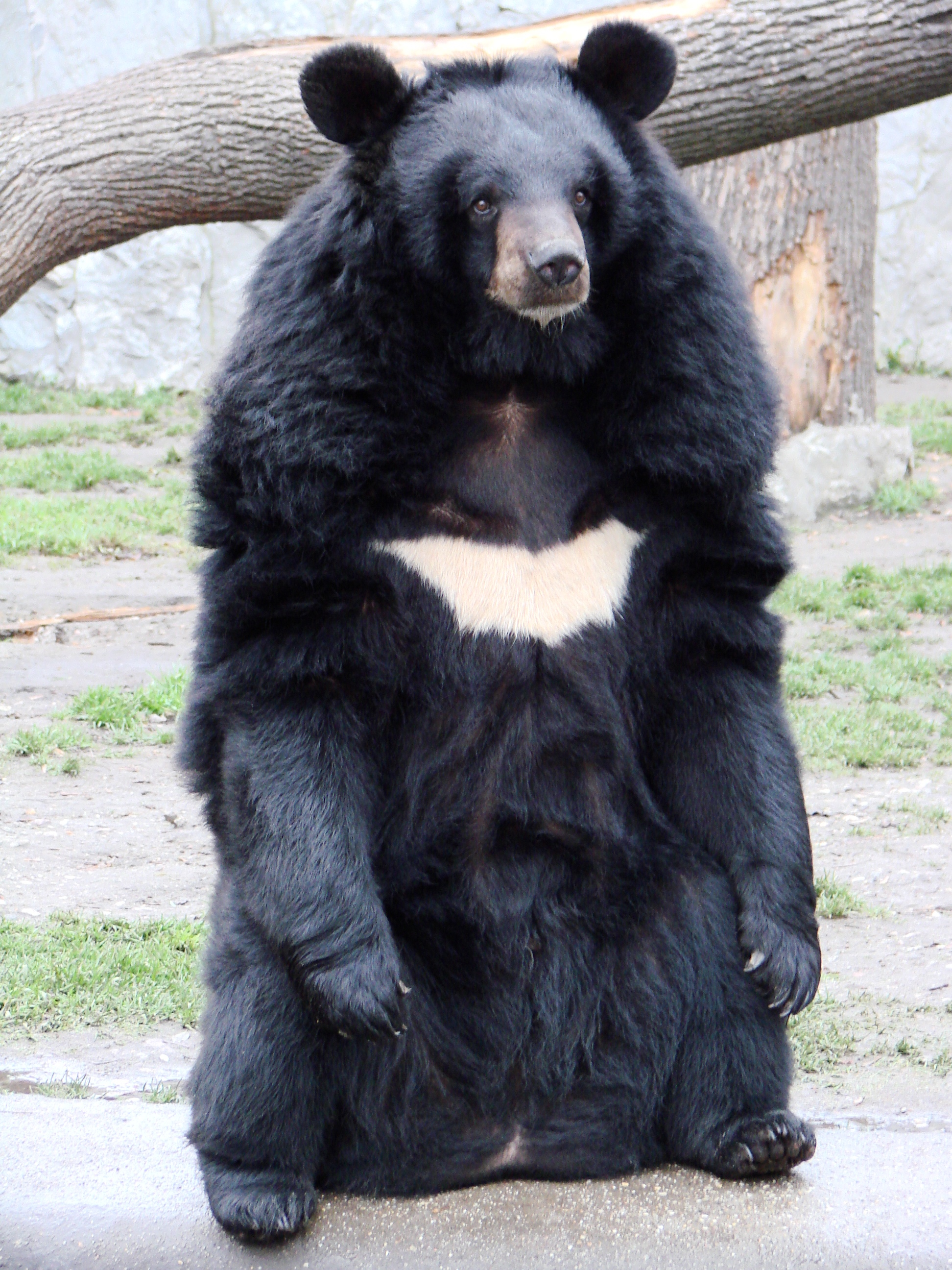
- At Wrocław Zoo, Poland

Conservation status
- Vulnerable (IUCN 3.1)
- CITES Appendix I

Scientific classification
- Kingdom: Animalia
- Phylum: Chordata
- Class: Mammalia
- Order: Carnivora
- Family: Ursidae
- Genus: Ursus
- Species: U. thibetanus

Binomial name
- Ursus thibetanus G. Cuvier, 1823

Subspecies
- 7, see text

Synonyms
- Plionarctos stehlini (Kretzoi, 1941); Ursus (Selenarctos) karabach (Vereschagin & Tikhonov, 1994); Ursus mediterraneus (Major 1873); Ursus torquatus (Blandford 1888); Ursus scherzi (Dehm 1943); Ursus (Plionarctos) telonensis (Bonifay, 1971); Selenarctos thibetanus (Gromov & Baranova, 1981)

= Asian black bear =

Asian black bear Temporal range: Early Pliocene–Recent

Species of bear

The Asian black bear (Ursus thibetanus), also known as the Asiatic black bear, moon bear and white-chested bear, is a medium-sized bear species native to Asia that is largely adapted to an arboreal lifestyle. It is distributed from southeastern Iran, Pakistan, India and the Himalayas to mainland Southeast Asia, the Korean Peninsula, Taiwan, China and the Russian Far East to the islands of Honshū and Shikoku in Japan. It is listed as vulnerable on the IUCN Red List, and is threatened by deforestation and poaching for its body parts, which are used in traditional medicine.

== Taxonomy ==
=== Ancestral and sister taxa ===
Biologically and morphologically, the Asian black bear represents the beginning of the arboreal specializations attained by sloth bears and sun bears. It has karyotypes nearly identical to those of the five other ursine bears, and has 74 chromosomes. It is considered the least derived of the Old World bears. It is either a surviving, albeit modified, form of Ursus etruscus, specifically the early, small variety of the Middle Villafranchian or a larger form of Ursus minimus, an extinct species that arose 4 million years ago. With the exception of the age of the bones, it is often difficult to distinguish the remains of Ursus minimus with those of the modern Asian black bear.

The Asian black bear and the American black bear are thought to have genetically diverged 3 million years ago, though genetic evidence is inconclusive. Both the American and Asian black species are considered sister taxa and are more closely related to each other than to the other bear species. The earliest known Asian black bear specimens are known from the early Pliocene in Moldova. The earliest American black bear fossils found in Pennsylvania greatly resemble the Asian black bear. Investigations on the mitochondrial cytochrome b sequence indicate that the divergence of continental Asian and Japanese black bear populations might have occurred when bears crossed the land bridge between the Korean Peninsula and Japan 500,000 years ago, which is consistent with paleontological evidence.

=== Subspecies ===
Asian black bear subspecies
Subspecies name	Common name	Distribution	Description
Ursus thibetanus formosanus R. Swinhoe, 1864	Formosan black bear	Taiwan	This subspecies lacks the thick neck fur of other subspecies.
Ursus thibetanus gedrosianus Blanford, 1877	Balochistan black bear	Southern Balochistan, Iran and Pakistan	A small subspecies with relatively short, coarse hair, often reddish-brown rather than black.
Ursus thibetanus japonicus Schlegel, 1857	Japanese black bear	Honshū and Shikoku. Extinct on Kyushu.	A small subspecies weighing 60–120 kg (130–260 lb) for the adult male and 40–100 kg (88–220 lb) for the adult female. The average body length is 1.1–1.4 m (3 ft 7 in – 4 ft 7 in). It lacks the thick neck fur of other subspecies, and has a darker snout.
Ursus thibetanus laniger Pocock, 1932	Himalayan black bear	The Himalayas	Distinguished from U. t. thibetanus by its longer, thicker fur and smaller, whiter chest mark. During the summer, Himalayan black bears occur in warmer areas in Nepal, China, Siberia, and Tibet at elevations of 3,000–3,600 m (9,800–11,800 ft). For winter, they descend as low as 1,500 m (4,900 ft). On average, they measure 1.4–1.6 m (4 ft 7 in – 5 ft 3 in) from nose to tail and weigh from 90–120 kg (200–260 lb), though they may weigh as much as 181 kg (399 lb) in the fall when they are fattening up for hibernation.
Ursus thibetanus mupinensis Heude, 1901	Indochinese black bear	Indochina	light-colored, similar to U. t. laniger
Ursus thibetanus thibetanus Cuvier, 1823	Tibetan black bear	Assam, Nepal, Myanmar, Mergui, Thailand and Annam	Distinguished from U. t. laniger by its short, thin coat with little to no underwool.
Ursus thibetanus ussuricus Heude, 1901	Ussuri black bear	Southern Siberia, northeastern China and the Korean Peninsula	the largest subspecies

Until the Late Pleistocene, two further subspecies ranged across Europe and West Asia. These are U. t. mediterraneus from Western Europe and the Caucasus and U. t. permjak from Eastern Europe, particularly the Ural Mountains.

=== Hybrids ===
Asian black bears are reproductively compatible with several other bear species, and have on occasion produced hybrid offspring. According to Jack Hanna's Monkeys on the Interstate, a bear captured in Sanford, Florida, was thought to have been the offspring of an escaped female Asian black bear and a male American black bear, and Scherren's Some notes on hybrid bears published in 1907 mentioned a successful mating between an Asian black bear and a sloth bear. In 1975, within Venezuela's "Las Delicias" Zoo, a female Asian black bear shared her enclosure with a male spectacled bear, and produced several hybrid descendants. In 2005, a possible Asian black bear–sun bear hybrid cub was captured in the Mekong River watershed of eastern Cambodia. An Asian black bear/brown bear hybrid, taken from a bile farm, is housed at the Animals Asia Foundation's China Moon Bear Rescue as of 2010.

== Characteristics ==
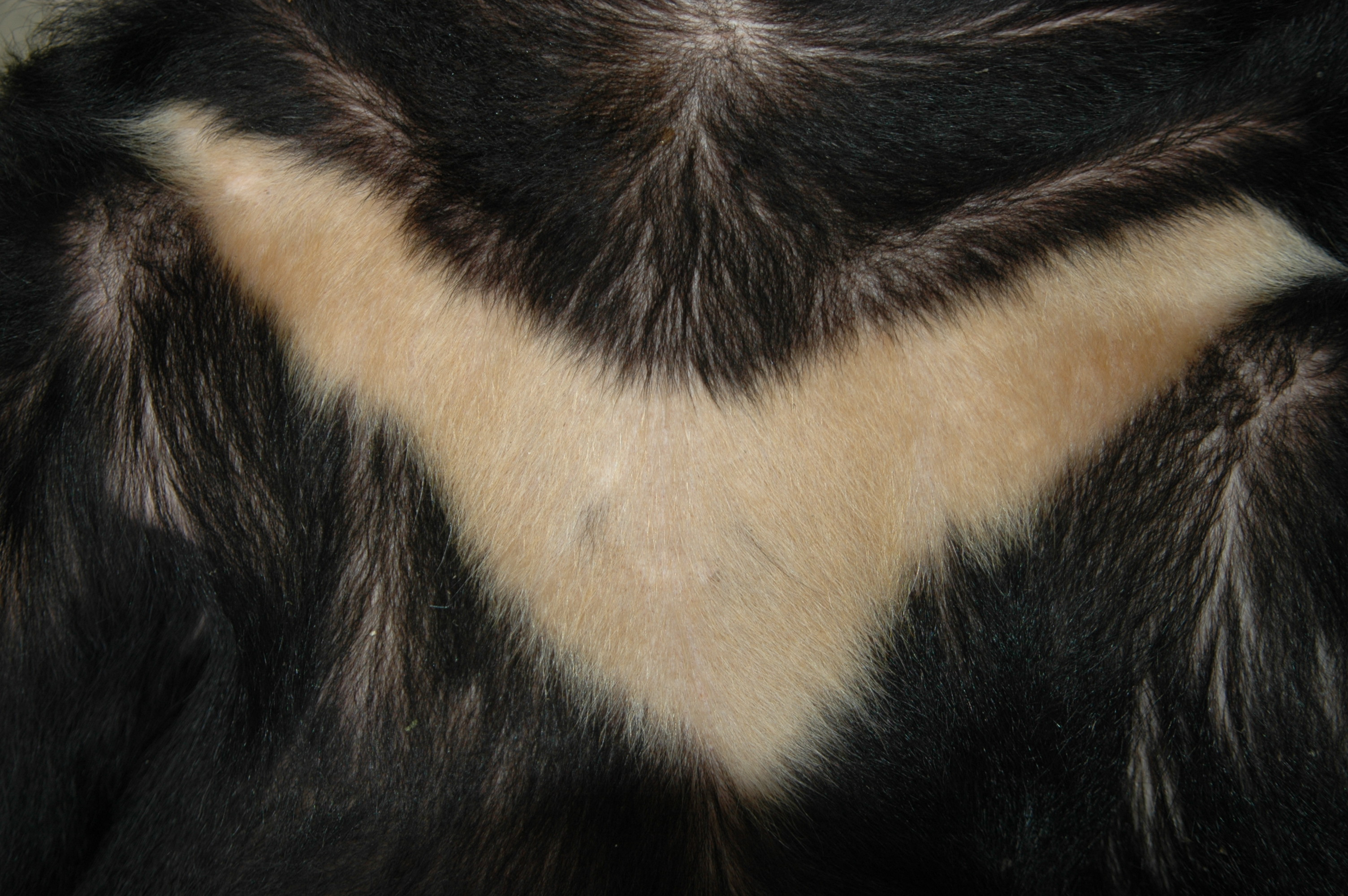
The white V-shaped chest mark of an Asian black bear

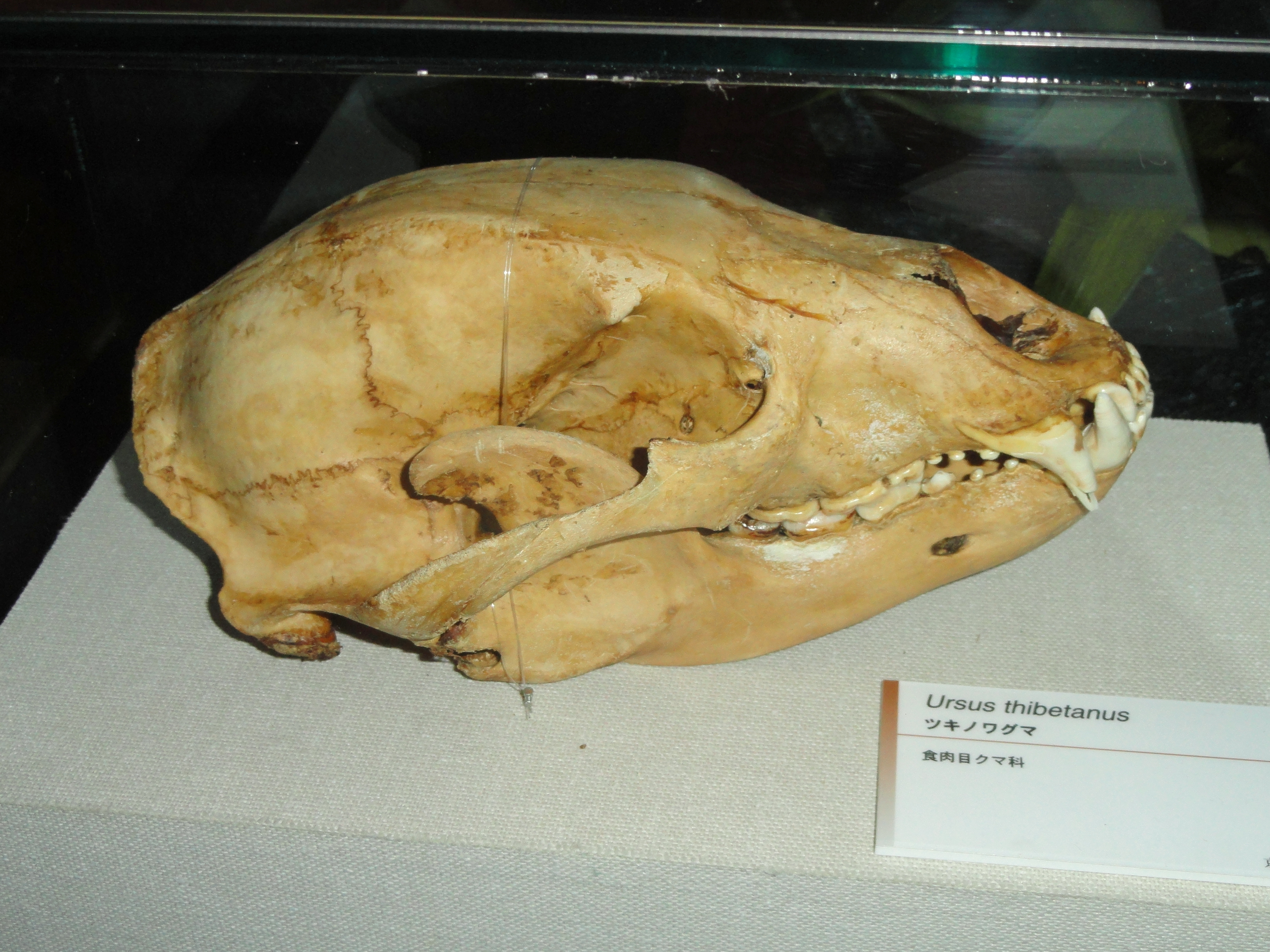
Asian black bear skull at Kyoto University Museum, Kyoto, Japan

The Asian black bear has black fur, a light brown muzzle, and a distinct whitish or creamy patch on the chest, which is sometimes V-shaped. Its ears are bell shaped, proportionately longer than those of other bears, and stick out sideways from the head. Its tail is short, around 11 cm (4.3 in) long. Adults measure 70–100 cm (28–39 in) at the shoulder, and 120–190 cm (47–75 in) in length. Adult males weigh 60–200 kg (130–440 lb) with an average weight of about 135 kg (298 lb). Adult females weigh 40–125 kg (88–276 lb), and large ones up to 140 kg (310 lb).

The Asian black bear is similar in general build to the brown bear (Ursus arctos), but is lighter and smaller. The lips and nose are larger and more mobile than those of brown bears. The skull of the Asian black bear is relatively small but massive, particularly in the lower jaw. Adult males have skulls measuring 311.7 to 328 mm (12.27 to 12.91 in) in length and 199.5–228 mm (7.85–8.98 in) in width, while female skulls are 291.6–315 mm (11.48–12.40 in) long and 163–173 mm (6.4–6.8 in) wide. Compared to other bears of the genus Ursus, the projections of the skull are weakly developed; the sagittal crest is low and short, even in old specimens, and does not exceed more than 19–20% of the total length of the skull, unlike in the brown bear, which has a sagittal crest comprising up to 41% of the skull's length.

Although the Asian black bear is mostly herbivorous, its jaw structure is not as specialized for plant eating as that of the giant panda; Asian black bears have much narrower zygomatic arches, and the weight ratio of the two pterygoid muscles is also much smaller in Asian black bears. The lateral slips of the temporal muscles are thicker and stronger in Asian black bears.

In contrast to the polar bear, the Asian black bear has a powerful upper body for climbing trees, and relatively weak hind legs which are shorter than those in the brown bear and American black bear. An Asian black bear with broken hind legs can still climb effectively. It is the most bipedal of all bears, and can walk upright for over 400 m (0.25 mi). The heel pads on the forefeet are larger than those of most other bear species. Their claws, which are primarily used for climbing and digging, are slightly longer on the fore foot at 30–45 mm (1.2–1.8 in) than the back foot at 18–36 mm (0.71–1.42 in), and are larger and more hooked than those of the American black bear. On average, adult Asian black bears are slightly smaller than American black bears, though large males can exceed the size of several other bear species.

The famed British sportsman known as the "Old Shekarry" wrote of how an Asian black bear he shot in India probably weighed no less than 363 kg (800 lb) based on how many people it took to lift its body. The largest Asian black bear on record allegedly weighed 200 kg (440 lb). Zoo-kept specimens can weigh up to 225 kg (496 lb). Although their senses are more acute than those of brown bears, their eyesight is poor, and their hearing range is moderate, the upper limit being 30 kHz.

== Distribution and habitat ==
During the Middle Pleistocene and early Late Pleistocene, the Asian black bear ranged from the Iberian Peninsula, the Balkans to the Ural Mountains. Today, it occurs very patchily in its former range from southeastern Iran eastward through Afghanistan and Pakistan, across the foothills of the Himalayas in India and Myanmar to mainland Southeast Asia, except Malaysia. Its range in mainland China is patchy in the northeast and south, Hainan, and it is absent in much of east-central China. Other population clusters exist in Taiwan, the southern Russian Far East and in North Korea. Small remnant populations survive in South Korea, and on Honshu and Shikoku islands. It typically inhabits deciduous forests, mixed forests and thornbrush forests. In the summer, it usually inhabits elevations of around 3,500 m (11,480 ft) in the Himalayas but rarely above 3,700 m (12,000 ft). In winter, it descends to elevations below 1,500 m (4,920 ft). In Japan, it also occurs at sea level.

There is no definitive estimate as to the number of Asian black bears: Japan posed estimates of 8–14,000 bears living on Honshū, though the reliability of this is now doubted. Although their reliability is unclear, rangewide estimates of 5–6,000 Asian black bears have been presented by Russian biologists. According to the Mammal Society of Japan, the introduction of conservation policies by the Ministry of the Environment, along with a decline in hunters due to an aging population, has led to a significant increase in the population and expansion of the range of the Japanese black bear. Estimates indicate that the population rose from approximately 15,000 individuals in 2012 to around 44,000 in 2023. Rough density estimates without corroborating methodology or data have been made in India and Pakistan, resulting in the estimates of 7–9,000 in India and 1,000 in Pakistan. Unsubstantiated estimates from China give varying estimates between 15 and 46,000, with a government estimate of 28,000.

=== Bangladesh ===
The Wildlife Trust of Bangladesh conducted an on-field survey of bears in Bangladesh from 2008 to 2010 that included Asian black bears. The survey was done in 87 different places, mostly in the north-central, northeastern and southeastern areas of Bangladesh that had historical presence of bears. The survey result says that most of the areas still has some isolated small bear populations, mainly the Asian black bears. According to the survey, the most evidence found relating to bears were of Asian black bears that included nests, footprints, local sightings, etc. There are many reports on the presence of Asian black bears in the central, north-central, northeastern and southeastern parts of Bangladesh.

Although Asian black bears still occur in different parts of Bangladesh, mainly in the Chittagong Hill Tracts, the population is very small. Conservationists fear that the species will soon be extinct in the country if necessary steps to protect it are not taken in the near future.

=== China ===
Three subspecies of the Asian black bear occur in China: the Tibetan subspecies (U. thibetanus thibetanus), the Indochinese subspecies (U. thibetanus mupinensis), and the northeastern subspecies (U. thibetanus ussuricus), which is the only subspecies of bear in northeastern China. Asian black bears are mainly distributed in the conifer forests in the cold and temperate zones of northeast China, the main areas being Changbai, Zhang Guangcai, Lao Ye, and the Lesser Xingan Mountains. Within Liaoning province, there are about 100 Asian black bears, which only inhabit the five counties of Xinbin, Huanren, Benxi, Kuandian, and Fencheng. Within Jilin province, Asian black bears occur mainly in the counties of Hunchun, Dunhua, Wangqing, Antu, Changbai, Fusong, Jiaohe, Huadian, Panshi, and Shulan. In Heilongjiang province, Asian black bears occur in the counties of Ningan, Bayan, Wuchang, Tonghe, Baoqing, Fuyuan, Yichun, Taoshan, Lanxi, Tieli, Sunwu, Aihui, Dedu, Beian, and Nenjiang. This population has a northern boundary of about 50° N and the southern boundary in Fengcheng is about 40°30" N.

=== Korea ===
By the 1990s, poaching, habitat destruction, and eradication during the Japanese occupation had led to the local extinction of the species from South Korea. In 2004, the South Korean government initiated a reintroduction program in Jiri Mountain National Park. The effort has been successful, with bears now inhabiting the park and dispersing into northern forests. In 2021, the park's bear population appeared to have reached its carrying capacity. In Korea, most of the Asian black bears live in the broad-leaved forest of the alpine region, more than 1,500 meters north of Jirisan. As of April 2018, there were 56 bears living in the wild of Jirisan.

=== Pakistan ===
A historical and fundamental study from 1977 has provided a first comprehensive overview of the Asiatic black bear distribution across various regions of the Pakistan, including Kaghan Valley, Neelum, Astore, Dir, Kohistan, Chitral, Chilas, Rondu Valley, Gabral, Khanspur, Muree Hills, Koh e Sufaid, Kuchmina, Shin Ghar, Takht e Suliman, Khalifat Ziarat, Wam Tangi, Kalat, Kharan, Khuzdar, Jhal Jao Hills, Pab Range Hills, and Kirthar Hills. However, since then, many of these areas have not been revisited to confirm its presence, particularly in the southern districts of Khyber Pakhtunkhwa, Balochistan and Sindh. According to a 2025 review, the studies on the Asiatic black bear were mainly focused on the Himalayan black bear in the northern regions of Pakistan, mainly in the Hindukush Himalayas, with Mansehra district and Azad Jammu Kashmir as main research areas, in Mansehra district, particularly in areas such as Kaghan and the Siran Valley, including Neelum, Machiara National Park, Pir Chinasi, Pir Hasimar, Musk Deer National Park, Toli Pir National Park, Moji Game Reserve, Banjosa, Leepa Valley, Hatian Bala, Haveli, Bagh, and Muzaffarabad, and in other areas such as Battagram, Kohistan, Bajaur, Astore, Diamer, and Kumrat. The Baluchistan black bear occurs throughout the mountainous Balochistan region in western Pakistan, south-eastern Iran and south-western Afghanistan. The Baluchistan black bear is now limited in southwestern Pakistan and southeast Iran.

=== Siberia ===
In Siberia, the Asian black bear's northern range runs from Innokenti Bay on the coast of the Sea of Japan southwest to the elevated areas of Sikhote Alin crossing it at the sources of the Samarga River. At this point, the boundary directs itself to the north, through the middle course of the Khor, Anyui and Khungari rivers, and comes to the shore of the Amur, crossing it at the level of the mouth of the Gorin River. Along the Amur river, the species' presence has been noted as far as 51° N. Lat. From there, the territorial boundary runs southwest of the river's left bank, passing through the northern part of Lake Bolon and the juncture point of the Kur and Tunguska. Asian black bears are encountered in the Urmi's lower course. Within the Ussuri krai, the species is restricted to broad-leaved Manchurian-type forests.

=== Taiwan ===
In Taiwan, the endemic subspecies of Asian black bear, the Formosan black bear (Ursus thibetanus formosanus), is confined to the mountain ranges in the central regions of the island. It lives along the Central and Snow Mountain Range, with populations in the latter being more common. The largest population seems to live in Lala mountain in Chatienshan Reserve, the (Snow) Mountain area in Shei-Pa National Park and Taroko National Park south to Tawushan Reserve through Yushan National Park. It inhabits rugged areas at elevations of 1,000–3,500 m (3,300–11,500 ft). This population is estimated to comprise 200 to 600 individuals.

== Behavior and ecology ==
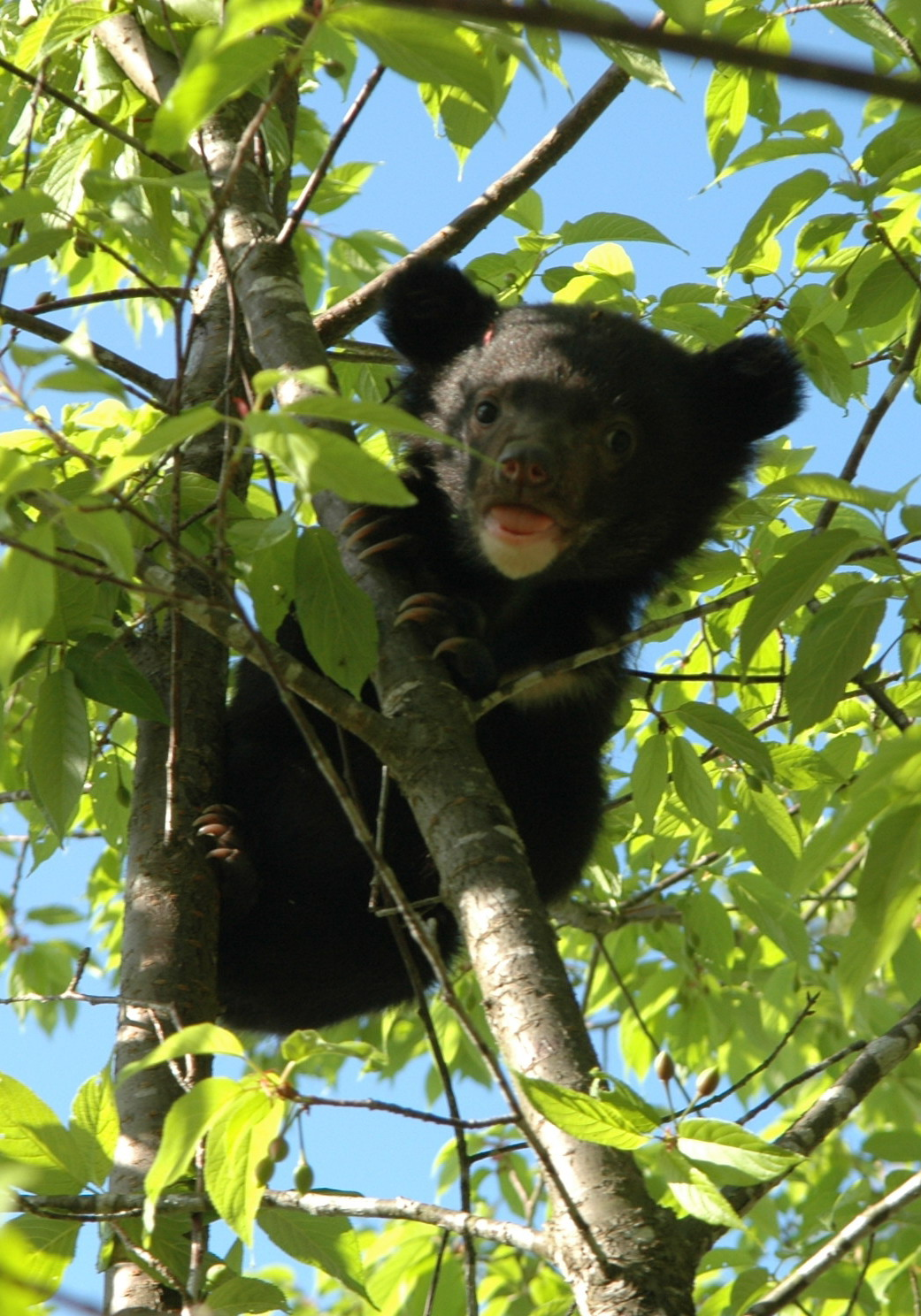
A cub in a tree

Asian black bears are diurnal, though they become nocturnal near human habitations. They will walk in a procession of largest to smallest. They are good climbers of rocks and trees, and will climb to feed, rest, sun, elude enemies and hibernate. Some older bears may become too heavy to climb. Half of their life is spent in trees and they are one of the largest arboreal mammals. In the Ussuri territory in the Russian Far East, Asian black bears can spend up to 15% of their time in trees. Asian black bears break branches and twigs to place under themselves when feeding on trees, thus causing many trees in their home ranges to have nest-like structures on their tops. Asian black bears will rest for short periods in nests on trees standing fifteen feet or higher.

Asian black bears do not hibernate over most of their range. They may hibernate in their colder, northern ranges, though some bears will simply move to lower elevations. Nearly all pregnant sows hibernate. Asian black bears prepare their dens for hibernation in mid-October, and will sleep from November until March. Their dens can either be dug-out hollow trees (60 feet above ground), caves or holes in the ground, hollow logs, or steep, mountainous and sunny slopes. They may also den in abandoned brown bear dens. Asian black bears tend to den at lower elevations and on less steep slopes than brown bears. Female Asian black bears emerge from dens later than do males, and female Asian black bears with cubs emerge later than barren females. Asian black bears tend to be less mobile than brown bears. With sufficient food, Asian black bears can remain in an area of roughly 1–2 km^{2} (0.39–0.77 sq mi), and sometimes even as little as 0.5–1 km^{2} (0.19–0.39 sq mi).

Asian black bears have a wide range of vocalizations, including grunts, whines, roars, slurping sounds (sometimes made when feeding) and "an appalling row" when wounded, alarmed or angry. They emit loud hisses when issuing warnings or threats, and scream when fighting. When approaching other bears, they produce "tut tut" sounds, thought to be produced by bears snapping their tongue against the roof of their mouth. When courting, they emit clucking sounds.

=== Reproduction and life cycle ===
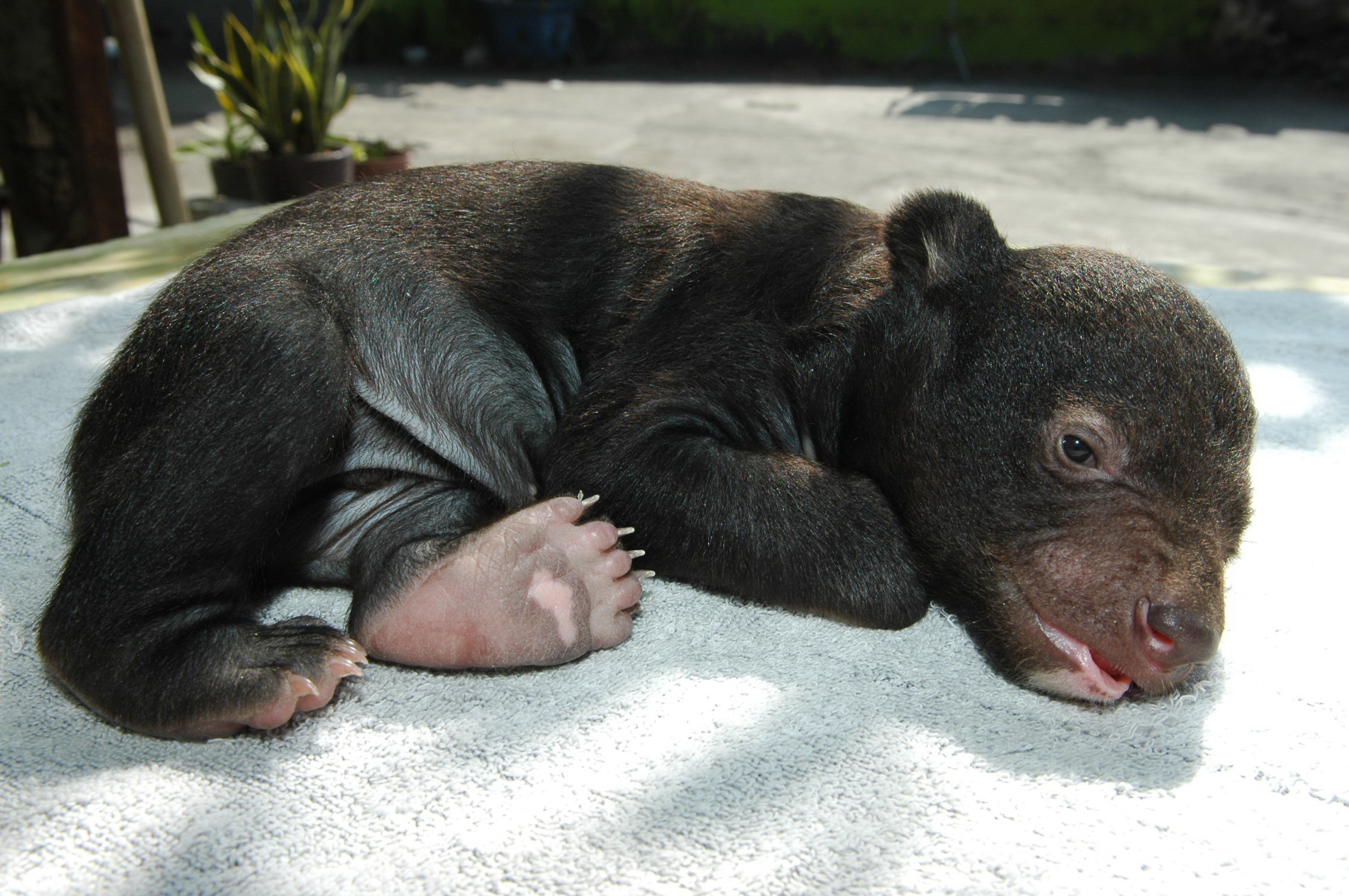
A 44-day-old Asian black bear

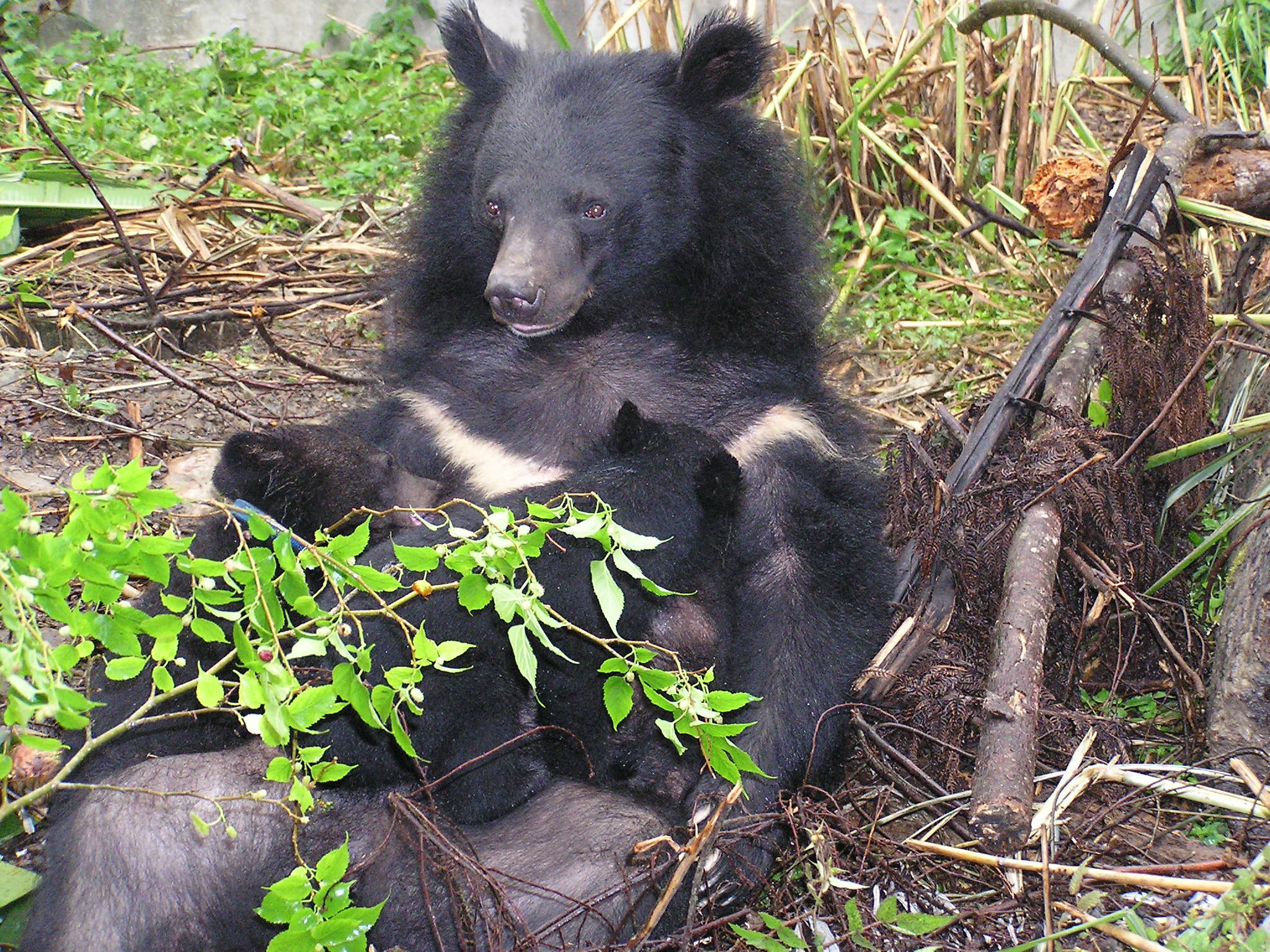
A sow nursing her cubs

Within Sikhote-Alin, the breeding season of Asian black bears occurs earlier than in brown bears, starting from mid-June to mid-August. Birth also occurs earlier, in mid-January. By October, the uterine horns of pregnant females grow to 15–22 mm (0.59–0.87 in). By late December, the embryos weigh 75 grams. Sows generally have their first litter at the age of three years. Pregnant females generally make up 14% of populations. Similar to brown bears, Asian black bears have delayed implantation. Sows usually give birth in caves or hollow trees in winter or early spring after a gestation period of 200–240 days. Cubs weigh 13 ounces at birth, and will begin walking at four days of age, and open their eyes three days later. The skulls of newborn Asian black bear cubs bear great resemblance to those of adult sun bears. Litters can consist of 1–4 cubs, with 2 being the average. Cubs have a slow growth rate, reaching only 2.5 kg by May. Asian black bear cubs will nurse for 104–130 weeks, and become independent at 24–36 months. There is usually a 2–3 year interval period before females produce subsequent litters. The average lifespan in the wild is 25 years, while the oldest Asian black bear in captivity died at the age of 44.

=== Feeding ===
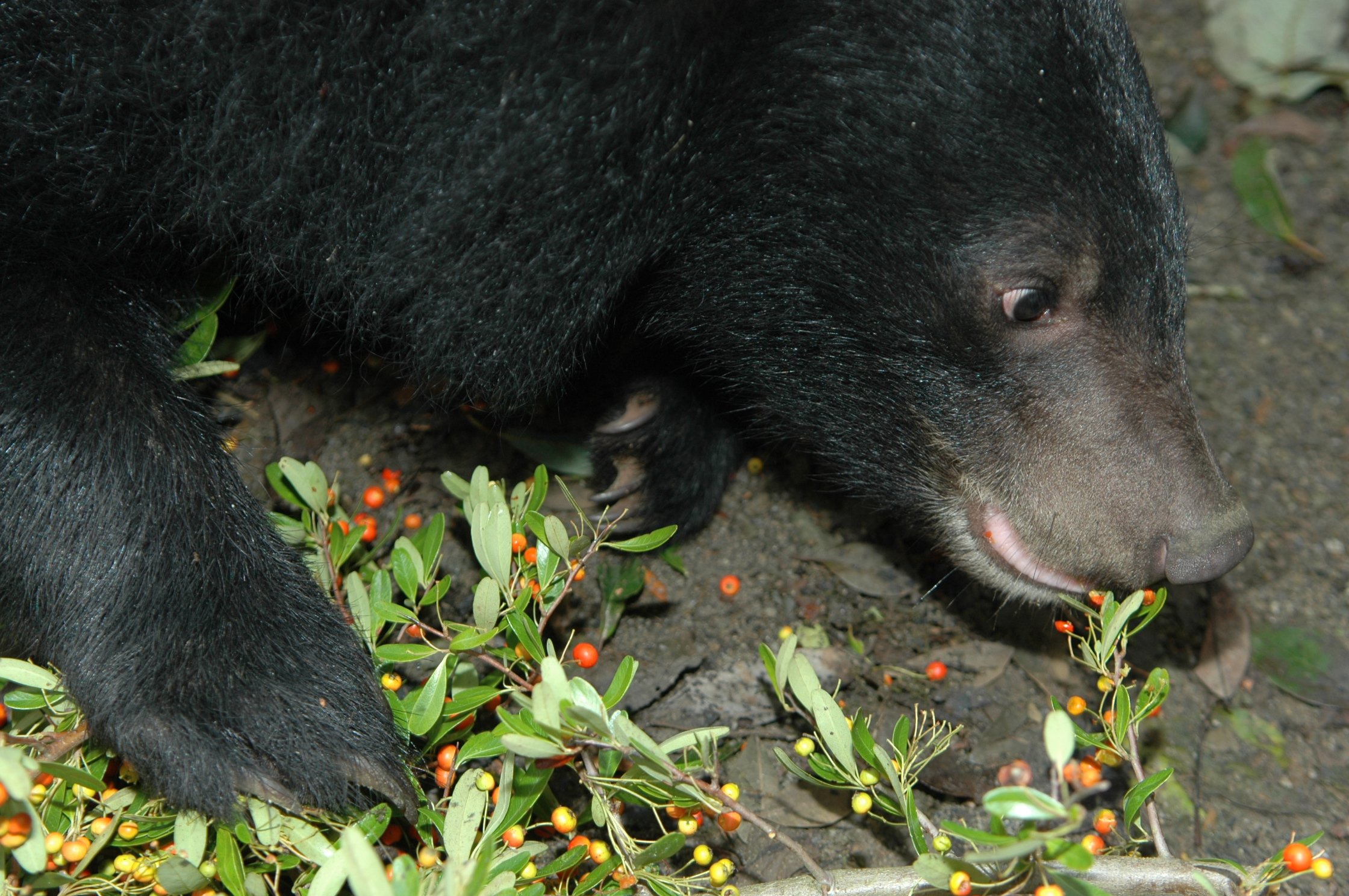
An Asian black bear feeding on berries

The Asian black bear is omnivorous and feeds on insects, beetle larvae, invertebrates, termites, grubs, carrion, bees, eggs, garbage, mushrooms, grasses, bark, roots, tubers, fruits, nuts, seeds, honey, herbs, acorns, cherries, dogwood and grain. It eats pine nuts and acorns of the previous year in the April–May period. In times of scarcity, it enters river valleys to gain access to hazelnuts and insect larvae in rotting logs. From mid-May through late June, it supplements its diet with green vegetation and fruit. Through July to September, it climbs trees to eat bird cherries, pine cones, vines and grapes. On rare occasions, it eats dead fish during the spawning season, though this constitutes a much lesser portion of its diet. In the 1970s, Asian black bears were reported to kill and eat Hanuman langurs in Nepal. Although herbivorous to a greater degree than the brown bear, and more carnivorous than the American black bear, the Asian black bear is not as specialized but more opportunistic, gorging on a variety of seasonal high calorie foods, storing the excess calories as fat, and then hibernates during times of scarcity. It also kills ungulates with some regularity, including domestic livestock. Wild ungulate prey can include muntjacs, serow, takin, Malayan tapir wild boar and adult water buffaloes, which it kills by breaking their necks.

Black bears in Japan, specifically, are reported as mainly eating acorns throughout the year and having similar caloric fluctuations. Their energy balance declines from May to June, rises again in August through October, and declines once more in November. Male and female bears both have a higher energy balance in good mast years rather than poor mast years. Moreover, during a poor mast year, male bears' energy intake will become negative in February during their hibernation period, and will not exceed zero until August, even if they can begin feeding earlier in the year.

=== Interspecific predatory relationships ===
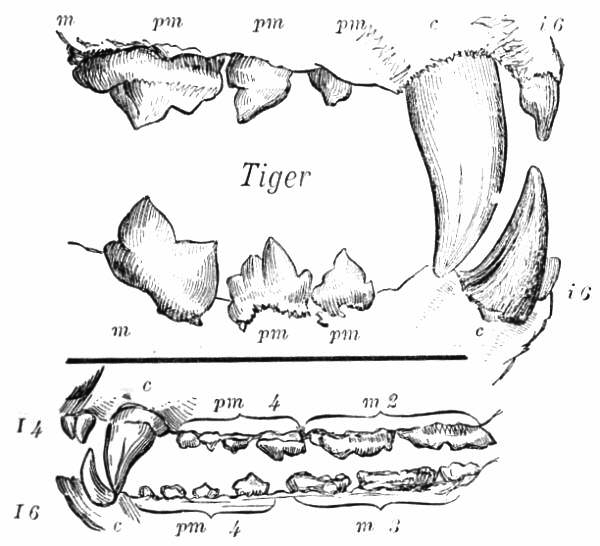
The dentition of an Asian black bear (below), compared with that of a tiger (above)

The Asian black bear's range overlaps with that of the sloth bear in central and southern India, the sun bear in Southeast Asia and the brown bear in the southern part of the Russian Far East. Asian black bears seem to intimidate Himalayan brown bears in direct encounters. They eat the fruit dropped by Asian black bears from trees, as they themselves are too large and cumbersome to climb. Ussuri brown bears may attack Asian black bears.

Asian black bears are occasionally attacked by tigers and brown bears. Leopards are known to prey on bear cubs younger than two years old. Packs of wolves and Eurasian lynxes are potential predators of bear cubs as well. Asian black bears usually dominate Amur leopards in physical confrontations in heavily vegetated areas, while leopards are uppermost in open areas, though the outcome of such encounters is largely dependent on the size of the individual animals.

Tigers occasionally attack and consume Asian black bears. Russian hunters found their remains in tiger scats, and Asian black bear carcasses showing evidence of tiger predation. To escape tigers, Asian black bears rush up a tree and wait for the tiger to leave, though some tigers will pretend to leave, and wait for the bear to descend. Tigers prey foremost on young bears. Some are very tenacious when attacked: Jim Corbett observed a fight between a tiger and the largest Asian black bear he had ever seen. The bear managed to chase off the tiger, despite having half its nose and scalp torn off. He twice saw Asian black bears carry off tiger kills when the latter was absent. Asian black bears are usually safe from tiger attacks once they reach five years of age. One fatal attack of a tiger on a juvenile Asian black bear has been recorded in Jigme Dorji National Park. One Siberian tiger was reported to have lured an Asian black bear by imitating its mating call. However, Asian black bears are probably less vulnerable to tiger attacks than brown bears, due to their habit of living in hollows or in close set rocks.

== Conservation ==
The Asian black bear is listed as a protected animal in China's National Protection Wildlife Law, which stipulates that anyone hunting or catching bears without permits will be subject to severe punishment.

Although the Asian black bear is protected in India, due to being listed as vulnerable in the Red Data Book in Appendix I of CITES in India and in Schedule I of the Indian Wildlife (Protection) Act and its 1991 amendment, it has been difficult to prosecute those accused of poaching Asian black bears due to lack of witnesses and lack of Wildlife Forensic Labs to detect the originality of confiscated animal parts or products. Moreover, due to India's wide-stretching boundaries with other nations such as Pakistan, Tibet, China, Nepal, Bhutan, Bangladesh and Myanmar, it is difficult to police such borders, which are often in mountainous terrain.

Five Asian black bear populations, occurring in Kyushu, Shikoku, West-Chugoku, East-Chugoku and Kii areas, were listed as endangered by the Environmental Agency in the Japanese Red Data Book in 1991. Small isolated populations in the Tanzawa and Shimokita areas of mainland Honshū were listed as endangered in 1995. In 2000, the Ministry of the Environment introduced a bear management manual that set an upper limit on the annual capture rate relative to the estimated population, marking a full shift toward conservation policy. The manual has since undergone several revisions. As hunting quotas declined and as the number of hunters decreased due to an aging population, the Japanese black bear population grew rapidly through 2023, particularly on Honshu.

Asian black bears occur as an infrequent species in the Red Data Book of Russia, thus falling under special protection and hunting is prohibited. There is currently a strong movement to legalize the hunting of Russian black bears, which is supported by most of the local scientific community.

As of January 30, 1989, Taiwan's Formosan black bears have been listed as an endangered species under the Natural and Cultural Heritage Act on, and was later listed as a Conserved Species Category I.

The Vietnamese government issued Decision 276/QD, 276/1989, which prohibits the hunting and exporting of Asian black bears. The Red Book of Vietnam lists Vietnamese black bears as endangered.

The Korean Government designated the Asian black bear as Natural Monument No. 329 and it is considered an extinction crisis. At the present time, the Endangered Species Restoration Center of Korea National Park Service is going through species restoration business.

The Asiatic black bear and the subspecies Baluchistan black bear have been classified as vulnerable since 1979 and critically endangered since 1996 in Pakistan, respectively, on the IUCN Red List. Additionally, they are both listed in Appendix I of the Convention on the International Trade of Endangered Species. Currently, numerous studies focusing on the use of advanced technological tools—such as modern cameras, GIS applications, and ecological modelling —as well as the administration of questionnaires in various villages where the Asiatic black bear has come into conflict with local communities, have helped to identify and design new strategies for bear's conservation.

== Threats ==
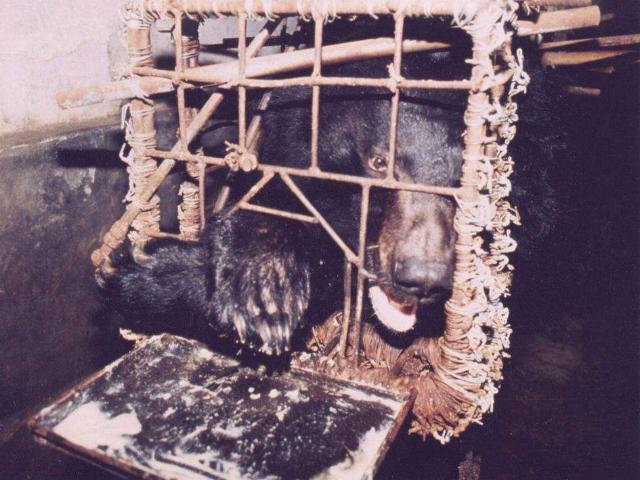
A bile bear in a "crush cage" on Huizhou Farm, Huizhou, China

The main habitat threat to Asian black bears is overcutting of forests, mainly due to human populations increasing to over 430,000 in regions where bears are distributed, in Shaanxi, Gansu, and Sichuan provinces of China. 27 forestry enterprises were built in these areas between 1950 and 1985 (excluding the lumbering units belonging to the county). By the early 1990s, the Asian black bear distribution area was reduced to only one-fifth of the area that existed before the 1940s. Isolated bear populations face environmental and genetic stress in these circumstances. However, one of the most important reasons for their decrease involves overhunting, as Asian black bear paws, gall bladders and cubs have great economic value. Asian black bear harvests are maintained at a high level due to the harm they cause to crops, orchards and bee farms. During the 1950s and 1960s, 1,000 Asian black bears were harvested annually in the Heilongjiang Province. However, purchased furs were reduced by 4/5, even by 9/10 yearly in the late 1970s to the early 1980s. Asian black bears have also been declining annually in Dehong Dai and Jingpo Autonomous Prefecture and Yunnan.

Poaching for gall bladders and skin are the main threats faced by Asian black bears in India.

In Pakistan, in addition to direct killing, commercial poaching, and human-bear conflict, the primary concerns are habitat loss brought on by logging, the growth of plantations and agriculture, road networks, and dams. From 11,807 km² in the 1950s to 7,925 km² in 2014, the Asiatic black bear population has decreased. It primarily inhabits lower-altitude areas of Khyber Pakhtunkhwa, Gilgit-Baltistan, and Azad Jammu and Kashmir, which are distinguished by densely populated areas, forested vegetation, and related agriculture.

From the 1970s to the 1980s, Japan conducted large-scale culling of black bears in spring to prevent bark stripping of cedar and cypress plantations, which led to a sharp decline in their population. In response, from the late 1980s, hunting restrictions and voluntary self-restraint were introduced in western Japan, reducing the number of bears hunted, although poaching remained a problem. In 2000, the Ministry of the Environment established a management manual aimed at population recovery, explicitly setting annual culling limits based on estimated population size; this manual was subsequently revised several times. Following this, hunting numbers declined due to both conservation policies and the aging hunter population, allowing the bear population to recover. Combined with poor mast production caused by climate change, this population recovery contributed to a sharp increase in injuries and fatalities caused by bears around 2023, reaching a record high in 2025. Consequently, in 2024, the Japanese government revised the existing black bear conservation plan, shifting toward a more proactive population management policy through hunting, with many bears again becoming targets for culling.

Although Asian black bears have been afforded protection in Russia since 1983, illegal poaching, fueled by a growing demand for bear parts in the Asian market, is still a major threat to the Russian population. Many workers of Chinese and Korean origin, supposedly employed in the timber industry, are actually involved in the illegal trade. Some Russian sailors reportedly purchase bear parts from local hunters to sell them to Japanese and Southeast Asian clients. Russia's rapidly growing timber industry has been a serious threat to the Asian black bear's home range for three decades. The cutting of trees containing cavities deprives Asian black bears of their main source of dens, and forces them to den on the ground or in rocks, thus making them more vulnerable to tigers, brown bears and hunters.

In Taiwan, Asian black bears are not actively pursued, though steel traps set out for wild boars have been responsible for unintentional bear trappings. Timber harvesting has largely stopped being a major threat to Taiwan's Asian black bear population, though a new policy concerning the transfer of ownership of hill land from the government to private interests has the potential to affect some lowland habitat, particularly in the eastern part of the nation. The building of new cross island highways through bear habitat is also potentially threatening.

Vietnamese black bear populations have declined rapidly due to the pressures of human population growth and unstable settlement. Vietnamese forests have been shrinking: of the 87,000 km^{2} (34,000 sq mi) of natural forests, about 1,000 km^{2} (390 sq mi) disappear every year. Hunting pressures have also increased with a coinciding decline of environmental awareness.

South Korea remains one of two countries to allow bear bile farming to continue legally. As reported in 2009, approximately 1,374 Asian black bears reside in an estimated 74 bear farms, where they are kept for slaughter to fuel the demands of traditional Asian medicine. In sharp contrast, fewer than 20 Asian black bears can be found at Jirisan Restoration Center, located in Korea's Jirisan National Park.

In recent years, climate change has also contributed to the declining Asian black bear population across southern and southeastern Iran. As large mammals, these bears respond more to climate change than small prey species. Due to their large size, Asian black bears are unable to utilize micro-climatic refuges, like hiding in grass to regulate temperature. Over the past thirty years, a thirty to forty percent decrease has been reported in the Asian black bear population, correlating with the rise in global temperatures. Along with that, a ten percent decrease in suitable habitat has been reported since 2016, due to climate change and deforestation.

== Relationships with humans ==
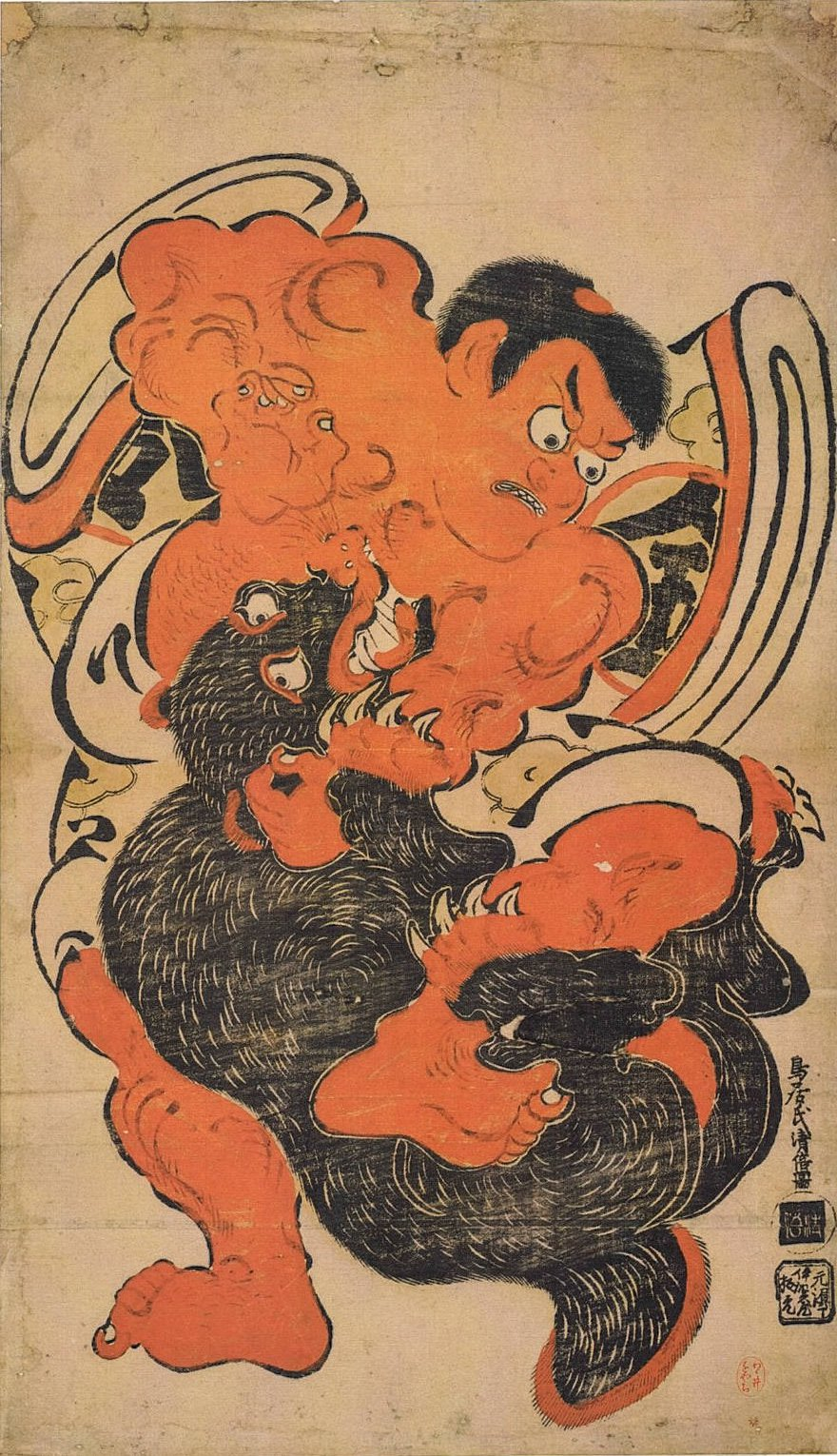
Kintoki Wrestling with a Black Bear, woodblock print by Torii Kiyomasu I, c. 1700, Honolulu Academy of Arts

=== In folklore, literature, and popular culture ===
In Japanese culture, the Asian black bear is traditionally associated with the mountain spirit (yama no kami) and is characterized variously as 'mountain man' (yamaotoko), 'mountain uncle' (yama no ossan), 'mountain father' (yama no oyaji), a loving mother, and a child. Being a largely solitary creature, the Asian black bear is also viewed as 'lonely person' (sabishigariya). Asian black bears feature very little in lowland Japanese folklore, but are prominent in upland Japan, a fact thought to reflect the bear's greater economic value in upland areas. According to the local folklore in Kituarahara-gun in Niigata, the Asian black bear received its white mark after being given a silk-wrapped amulet by yama no kami, which left the mark after being removed. In Hindu mythology, the Asian black bear Jambavantha (also known as Jambavan or Jamvanta) is believed to have lived from Treta Yuga to Dvapara Yuga. In the epic Ramayana, Jambavantha assists Rama in finding his wife Sita and battle her abductor, Ravana.

The Asian black bear in Thailand is called mi khwai (Thai: หมีควาย), meaning 'buffalo bear', not due to its appearance, but a v-shaped patch of fur under its neck similar to that of a buffalo. There is also a Thai idiom, bon meuan mi kin pheung (Thai: บ่นเหมือนหมีกินผึ้ง), literally 'grumbling like a bear eating honey', referring to people who display behaviors of grumbling and mumbling to express dissatisfaction. This idiom comes from the behavior of this species of bear when it climbs trees in search of honey and young bees. While eating honey, it makes a murmuring sound.

In Taiwan, the Bunun people regard bears and humans as sharing common ancestry. The Formosan black bear emerged as a symbol of Taiwanese nationalism in the 21st century, often in contradistinction or shown in conflict with the panda (as a symbol of the PRC), or with Winnie-the-Pooh (as a symbol of Xi Jinping).

Asian black bears are briefly mentioned in Yann Martel's 2001 novel The Life of Pi, in which they are described by the protagonist's father as being among the most dangerous animals in his zoo.

Historically, one of the main threats to the Asiatic black bear populations in Pakistan was the capture of cubs to use in bear dancing and baiting for entertainment in streets and villages, especially for tourists.

=== Attacks on humans ===
An Asian black bear, shot after charging the "Old Shekarry", as illustrated in Wild Sports of the World: A Boy's Book of Natural History and Adventure (1862)

A trio of captive Asian black bears around their keeper in Florence

Although usually shy and cautious animals, Asian black bears are more aggressive towards humans than the brown bears of Eurasia and American black bears. David W. Macdonald theorizes that this greater aggression is an adaptation to being sympatric with tigers. According to Brigadier General R. G. Burton:

The Himalayan black bear is a savage animal, sometimes attacking without provocation, and inflicting horrible wounds, attacking generally the head and face with their claws, while using their teeth also on a prostrate victim. It is not uncommon to see men who have been terribly mutilated, some having the scalp torn from the head, and many sportsmen have been killed by these bears.

— A Book of Man Eaters, Chapter XVII Bears

In response to a chapter on Asian black bears written by Robert Armitage Sterndale in his Natural History of the Mammalia of India and Ceylon on how Asian black bears were no more dangerous than other animals in India, a reader responded with a letter to The Asian on May 11, 1880:

Mr Sterndale, in the course of his interesting papers on the Mammalia of British India, remarks of Ursus Tibetanus, commonly known as the Himalayan Black Bear, that 'a wounded one will sometimes show fight, but in general it tries to escape.' This description is not, I think, quite correct. As it would lead one to suppose that this bear is not more savage than any other wild animal—the nature of most of the feræ being to try to escape when wounded, unless they see the hunter who has fired at them, when many will charge at once, and desperately. The Himalayan Black Bear will not only do this almost invariably, but often attacks men without any provocation whatever, and is altogether about the most fierce, vicious, dangerous brute to be met with either in the hills or plains of India. [...] These brutes are totally different in their dispositions to the Brown Bear (Ursus Isabellinus), which, however desperately wounded, will never charge. I believe there is no case on record of a hunter being charged by a Brown Bear; or even of natives, under any circumstances, being attacked by one; whereas every one of your readers who has ever marched in the Himalayas must have come across many victims of the ferocity of Ursus Tibetanus.

At the turn of the 20th century, a hospital in Srinagar, Kashmir received dozens of Asian black bear victims annually. When Asian black bears attack humans, they rear up on their hind legs and knock victims over with their front paws. Then they bite them on an arm or leg and snap on the victim's head, this being the most dangerous part of the attack. Asian black bear attacks have been increasing in Kashmir since the Kashmir conflict. In November 2009, in the Kulgam district of Indian-administered Kashmir, an Asian black bear attacked four insurgents after discovering them in its den, and killed two of them.

In India, attacks on humans have been increasing yearly, and have occurred largely in the northwestern and western Himalayan region. In the Chamba District of Himachal Pradesh, the number of Asian black bear attacks on humans has gradually increased from 10 in 1988–89 to 21 in 1991–92. There are no records of predation on humans by Asian black bears in Russia, and no conflicts have been documented in Taiwan. Asian black bear attacks on humans were reported from Junbesi in Langtang National Park, Nepal in 2005, and occurred in villages as well as in the surrounding forest.

Nine people were killed by Asian black bears in Japan between 1979 and 1989. In September 2009, an Asian black bear attacked a group of 9 tourists, seriously injuring four of them at a bus station in the built-up area of Takayama, Gifu. The majority of attacks tend to occur when Asian black bears are encountered suddenly, and in close quarters. Because of this, Asian black bears are generally considered more dangerous than brown bears, which live in more open spaces and are thus less likely to be surprised by approaching humans. They are also likely to attack when protecting food.

2016 saw several attacks by Asian black bears in Japan. In May and June four people were killed by Asian black bears in Akita prefecture while picking bamboo shoots, and in August a female safari park worker in Gunma prefecture was killed when an Asian black bear climbed into her car and attacked her.

According to a recent review, humans killed ca. 50/100 individuals of the Himalayan black bear between 1998 and 2023 in Pakistan. No data were reported for the Baluchistan black bear. However, we are well aware that this value is greatly underestimated because this type of information is often intentionally concealed.

=== Livestock predation and crop damage ===
In the past, the farmers of the Himalayan lowlands feared Asian black bears more than any other pest, and would erect platforms in the fields, where watchmen would be posted at night and would beat drums to frighten off any interlopers. However, some Asian black bears would grow accustomed to the sound and encroach anyway.

Of 1,375 livestock kills examined in Bhutan, Asian black bears accounted for 8% of attacks. Livestock predation, overall, was greatest in the summer and autumn periods, which corresponded with a peak in cropping agriculture; livestock are turned out to pasture and forest during the cropping season and, subsequently, are less well-guarded than at other times.

Livestock killed by Asian black bears in Himachal Pradesh, India increased from 29 in 1988–1989 to 45 in 1992–1993.

In more remote areas of Japan, Asian black bears can be serious crop predators. The bears feed on cultivated bamboo shoots in spring, on plums, watermelons, and corn in the summer, and on persimmons, sweet potatoes, and rice in the autumn. Japanese black bears are estimated to damage 3,000 beehives annually. When feeding on large crops such as watermelons or pumpkins, Asian black bears will ignore the flesh and eat the seeds, thus adversely affecting future harvests. Asian black bears can girdle and kill trees by stripping their bark for the sap. This can cause serious economic problems in Asia's valuable timber forests. In the late 1970s, 400–1,200 hectares (990–2,970 acres) of land had been affected by Asian black bears bark-stripping Japanese conifers. There is evidence that 70-year-old conifers (commanding the highest market values) may also have been bark-stripped.

Asian black bears will prey on livestock if their natural food is in poor supply. They have been known to attack bullocks, either killing them outright, or eating them alive.

=== Tameability and trainability ===
Along with sun bears, Asian black bears are the most typically used species in areas where bears are used either in performances or as pets. Asian black bears have an outstanding learning ability in captivity, and are among the most common species used in circus acts. According to Gary Brown:

The Asiatic black bears are the comedians of the performing bears. They appear to appreciate applause and will intentionally move into their prescribed position late to attain laughter and attention. — Brown, The Influence of Bears on Humans

Asian black bears are easily tamed, and can be fed with rice, maize, sweet potatoes, cassavas, pumpkins, ripe fruit, animal fat and sweet foods. Keeping captive Asian black bears is popular in China, especially due to the belief that milking the bear's gall bladder leads to quick prosperity. Asian black bears are also popular as pets in Vietnam.

=== Hunting and exploitation ===
==== Hunting ====
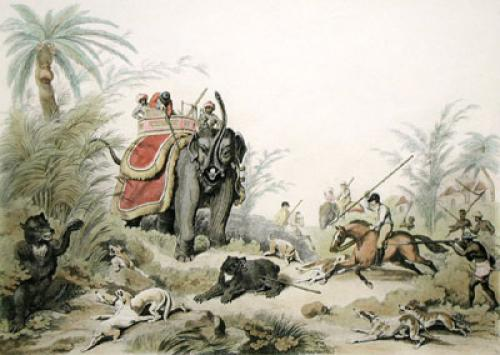
An Asian black bear hunt, as illustrated by Samuel Howitt

According to The Great and Small Game of India, Burma, and Tibet, regarding the hunting of Asian black bears in British India:

Black bear stalking in the forests bordering the valley of Kashmir requires much more care than is expended in approaching brown bear on the open hills above, the senses of sight and hearing being more strongly developed in the black than in the brown species. Many of these forests are very dense, so that it requires the eye of an experienced shikari [hunter] to detect the dark forms of the bears while searching for chestnuts on the ground without the advancing party being detected by the vigilant animals.

— The Great and Small Game of India, Burma, and Tibet p. 367

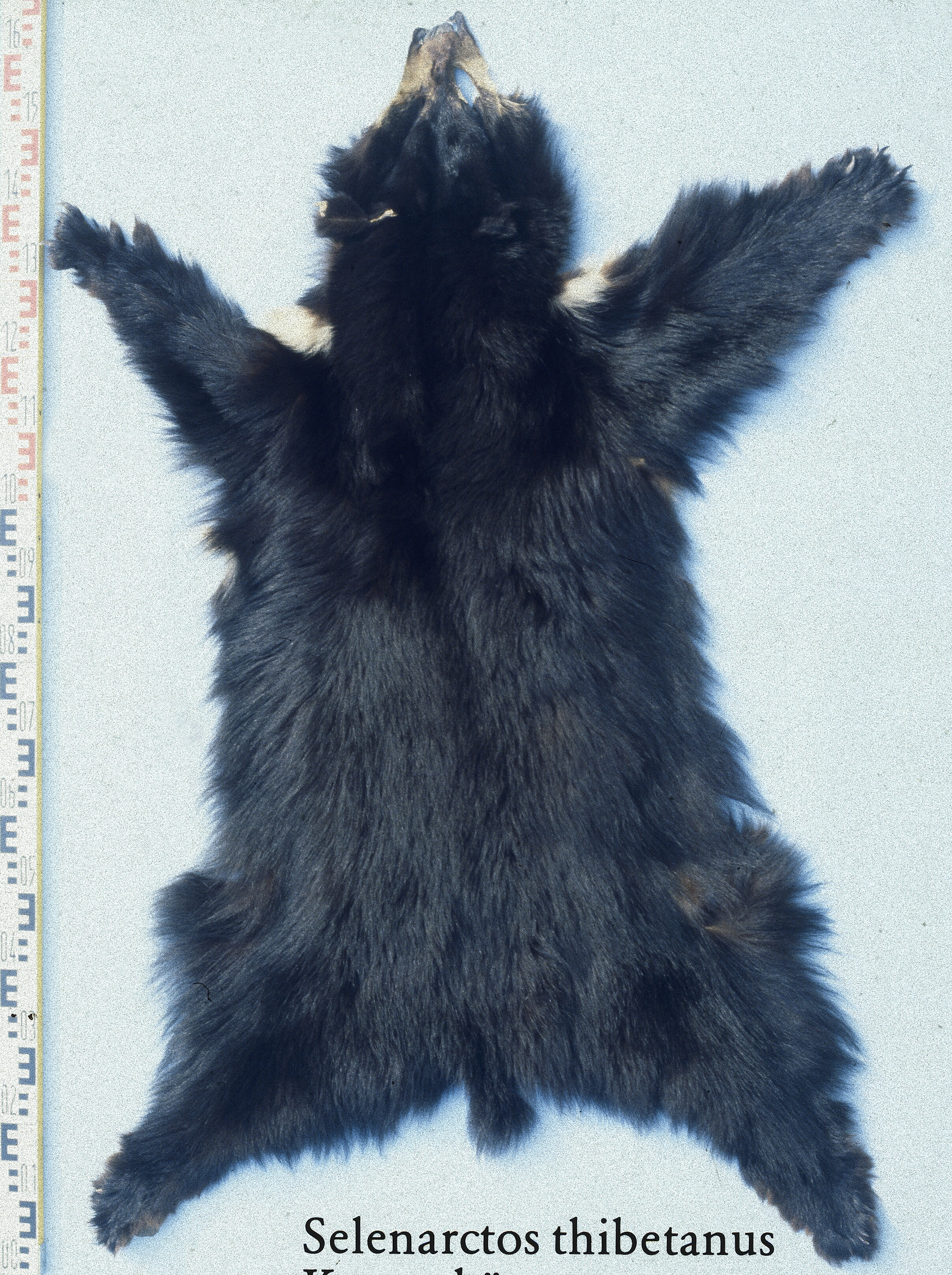
An Asian black bear skin

The book also describes a second method of black bear hunting involving the beating of small patches of forest, when the bears march out in single file. However, black bears were rarely hunted for sport, because of the poor quality of their fur and the ease by which they could be shot in trees, or stalked, as their hearing was poor.

Black bears here afford no sport; it is not shooting at all, it is merely potting a black thing in a tree... I can assure the reader that if he has a fondness for stalking, he will despise bear-killing, and will never shoot at them if there is a chance of anything else. If a man were to hunt for nothing else but bears, and kill a hundred in his six months' leave, he would not have enjoyed such real sport as he would, had he killed ten buck ibex or markhoor.

— The rifle in Cashmere p. 73–74

Although easy to track and shoot, Asian black bears were known by British sportsmen to be extremely dangerous when injured. Brigadier General R.G. Burton wrote of how many sportsmen had been killed by Asian black bears after failing to make direct hits.

Today, Asian black bears are only legally hunted for sport in Japan and Russia. In Russia, 75–100 Asian black bears are legally harvested annually, though 500 a year are reportedly harvested illegally.

After the introduction of Buddhism in Japan, which prohibited the killing of animals, the Japanese compromised by devising different strategies in hunting bears. Some, such as the inhabitants of the Kiso area in the Nagano Prefecture, prohibited the practice altogether, while others developed rituals in order to placate the spirits of killed bears. In some Japanese hunting communities, Asian black bears lacking the white chest mark are considered sacred. In the Akita Prefecture, bears lacking the mark were known by matagi huntsmen as minaguro ('all-black') or munaguro ('black-chested'), and were also considered messengers of yama no kami. If such a bear was shot, the huntsman would offer it to yama no kami, and give up hunting from that time on. Similar beliefs were held in Nagano, where the completely black Asian black bears were termed nekoguma, 'cat-bear'. Matagi communities believed that killing an Asian black bear in the mountains would result in a bad storm, which was linked to the belief that bear spirits could affect weather. The matagi would generally hunt Asian black bears in spring or from late autumn to early winter, before they hibernated. In mountain regions, Asian black bears were hunted by driving them upland to a waiting hunter, who would then shoot it. Bear hunting expeditions were preceded by rituals, and could last up to two weeks. After killing the bear, the matagi would pray for the bear's soul. Asian black bear hunts in Japan are often termed kuma taiji, meaning 'bear conquest'. The word taiji itself is often used in Japanese folklore to describe the slaying of monsters and demons.

Traditionally, the Atayal, Taroko, and Bunun people of Taiwan consider Asian black bears to be almost human in their behaviors, and thus unjust killing of bears is equated with murder and will cause misfortunes such as disease, death, or crop failure. The Bunun people call Asian black bears aguman or duman, which means 'devil'. Traditionally, a Bunun hunter who has accidentally trapped an Asian black bear has to build a cottage in the mountains and cremate the bear within it. The hunter must stay in the cottage alone, away from the village until the end of the millet harvest, as it is believed that the killing of an Asian black bear will cause the millet crop to burn black. In the Tungpu area, Asian black bears are considered animals of the "third category": animals with the most remote relationship to humans and whose activity is restricted outside human settlements. Therefore, when Asian black bears encroach upon human settlements, they are considered ill omens. In this situation, the community can either destroy the trespassing bears or settle somewhere else. The Rukai and Paiwan people are permitted to hunt Asian black bears, though they believe that doing so will curse the hunters involved: Rukai people believe that hunting Asian black bears can result in disease. Children are forbidden from eating bear meat, which is itself not permitted to be taken within homes.

==== Products ====
Asian black bears have been hunted for their body parts in China since the Stone Age. In the 19th century, its fur was considered of low value. Grease was the only practical use for their carcasses in British India, and bears living near villages were considered ideal, as they were almost invariably fatter than forest-dwelling ones. In the former USSR, the Asian black bear yielded fur, meat and fat of greater quality than those of the brown bear. Today, bile is in demand, as it supposedly cures various diseases, treats the accumulation of blood below the skin, and counters toxic effects. Products also include bone 'glue' and fat, both used in traditional medicine and consumed as a tonic. Asian black bear meat is also edible.
