= Estimates of opposing forces in the Battle of Borodino =

Following are major historians' or writers' estimates of the sizes of the opposing armies in the battle of Borodino, with the years in which those estimates were made.

Source	French	Russian	Year
Buturlin	190,000	132,000	1824
Ségur	130,000	120,000	1824
Chambray	133,819	130,000	1825
Fain	120,000	133,500	1827
Clausewitz	130,000	120,000	1830s
Mikhailovsky-Danilevsky	160,000	128,000	1839
Bogdanovich	130,000	120,800	1859
Marbot	140,000	160,000	1860
Burton	130,000	120,800	1914
Garnich	130,665	119,300	1956
Tarle	130,000	127,800	1962
Grunwald	130,000	120,000	1963
Beskrovny	135,000	126,000	1968
Chandler	156,000	120,800	1966
Thiry	120,000	133,000	1969
Holmes	130,000	120,800	1971
Duffy	133,000	125,000	1972
Tranié	127,000	120,000	1981
Nicolson	128,000	106,000	1985
Troitsky	134,000	154,800	1988
Vasilyev	130,000	155,200	1997
Smith	133,000	120,800	1998
Zemtsov	127,000	154,000	1999
Hourtoulle	115,000	140,000	2000
Bezotosny	135,000	150,000	2004
