= List of Thai language idioms =

Idioms in the Thai language are usually derived from various natural or cultural references. Many include rhyming and/or alliteration, and their distinction from aphorisms and proverbs are not always clear. This is a list of such idioms.

Idiom	RTGS	Literal translation	Idiomatic meaning	Notes
ก ข ไม่กระดิกหู	ko kho mai kradik hu	ko, kho (first two consonants of the Thai alphabet), not wiggling an ear	an illiterate person	
กงเกวียนกำเกวียน	kong kwian kam kwian	cart wheel, cart spokes	What one does will be returned by karma.	
ก้นกระดก	kon kradok		letting praise get the better of oneself	
กบในกะลาครอบ	kop nai kala khrop	frog underneath a coconut shell	one who has little knowledge or experience but thinks of oneself as wise	
กบเลือกนาย	kop lueak nai	frogs being choosy of masters	one who consistently wants to change superiors	from Aesop's The Frogs Who Desired a King
ก้มหน้า	kom na	bow down one's head	to endure a difficult situation	
ก้มหน้าก้มตา	kom na kom ta	bow down one's head and eyes	to concentrate on something	
กรรมตามสนอง	kam tam sanong		what goes around comes around	
กระชังหน้าใหญ่	krachang na yai	big-faced awning	brassy	
กระเชอก้นรั่ว	krachoe kon rua	bamboo basket with a leaky bottom	being a spendthrift	
กระดังงาลนไฟ	kradangnga lon fai	singed Cananga odorata flower	a woman who has been married before, and is therefore better at pleasing men	
กระดี่ได้น้ำ	kradi dai nam	gourami fish finding water	a person showing a lot of gladness and excitement	
กระดูกแข็ง	kraduk khaeng	(having) hard bones	not dying easily	
กระดูกร้องได้	kraduk rong dai	calling bones (personification)	a murder where certain effects lead to the conviction of the murderer	
กระดูกอ่อน	kraduk on	(having) soft bones	having little fighting skills	
กระต่ายตื่นตูม	kratai tuen tum	panicking hare	one who panics without giving due consideration	from the Daddabha Jataka tale of The Noise the Hare Heard
กระต่ายสามขา	kratai sam kha	three-legged hare	steadfastly denying something	also appears as กระต่ายขาเดียว (kratai kha diao, one-legged hare)
กระต่ายหมายจันทร์	kratai mai chan	hare wishing for the moon	a man interested in a woman of higher status	
กระโถนท้องพระโรง	krathon thong phra rong	spittoon in a royal hall	one who is consistently ordered by many people to run their errands	
กระหม่อมบาง	kramom bang	(having a) thin fontanelle/skull	easily falling ill	also appears as ขม่อมบาง (khamom bang)
กลมเป็นลูกมะนาว	klom pen luk manao	round as a lime	crafty and slippery	also appears as กลิ้งเป็นลูกมะนาว (kling pen luk manao, rolling like a lime)
กลับเนื้อกลับตัว	klap nuea klap tua	turn one's flesh and body	to change one's bad ways for the better	
กลับหน้ามือเป็นหลังมือ	klap na mue pen lang mue	turn from the palm to the back of the hand	to completely change for the opposite	also appears as พลิกหน้ามือเป็นหลังมือ (phlik na mue pen lang mue)
กล้านักมักบิ่น	kla nak mak bin	so bold, usually ends up chipped	being too bold it usually results in danger	
กวนน้ำให้ขุ่น	kuan nam hai khun	stir water and make it cloudy	to inflame a calm situation and cause disruption	
กว่าถั่วจะสุกงาก็ไหม้	kwa thua cha suk nga ko mai	By the time the beans cook, the sesame seeds have burnt.	being indecisive, resulting in losses from failure to act	
ก่อแล้วต้องสาน	ko laeo tong san	start it, must weave it	One must finish what one begins.	
กะลา	kala	coconut shell	worthless	
กัดหางตัวเอง	kat hang tua eng	bite one's own tail	speaking incoherently	
กาคาบพริก	ka khap prik	crow holding a chilli pepper in its mouth	a dark-skinned person wearing bright red clothes	
กาหลงรัง	ka long rang	lost crow in another's nest	one who refuses to return home; a tramp	
กำขี้ดีกว่ากำตด	kam khi di kwa kam tot	Better to grab faeces than flatulence.	Receiving anything is better than nothing at all.	
กำแพงมีหูประตูมีตา	kamphaeng mi hu pratu mi ta	Walls have ears, doors have eyes.	One should always mind their conduct; secrets can be revealed.	also appears as กำแพงมีหูประตูมีช่อง (kamphaeng mi hu pratu mii chong; walls have ears, doors have cracks)
กำลังกินกำลังนอน	kamlang kin kamlang non	eating and sleeping	(of infants/toddlers) being of eating and sleeping age	
กิ่งก้อย	king koi	little finger	tiny	
กิ่งทองใบหยก	king thong bai yok	gold branch, jade leaf	(of a marrying couple) suited for each other	
กินเกลือกินกะปิ	king kluea kin kapi	eating salt and shrimp paste	enduring trouble and poverty	
กินแกลบกินรำ	kin klaep kin ram	eating chaff and bran	stupid	
กินข้าวต้มกระโจมกลาง	kin khao tom krachom klang	eat boiled rice from the middle (of the bowl)	to do something in a hurry and without deliberation, resulting in harm	
กินตามน้ำ	kin tam nam	eat by the water flow	to receive gifts or bribes without actively asking	
กินที่ลับไขที่แจ้ง	kin thi lap khai thi chaeng	eat in secret, tell in public	to publicize what was done in secret	
กินน้ำตา	kin nam ta	drink tears	to cry, to be in sorrow	
กินน้ำตาต่างข้าว	kin nam ta tang khao	drink tears as a substitute for rice/food	to be so engrossed in tears and sorrow one is not eating	
กินน้ำใต้ศอก	kin nam tai sok	drink water from another's elbows	(usually of "minor wives") to be forced to accept subordinate status	
กินน้ำพริกถ้วยเก่า	kin nam phrik thuai kao	eat an old bowl of nam phrik	to (return to) live with one's previous wife	
กินน้ำพริกถ้วยเดียว	kin nam phrik thuai diao	eat only one bowl of nam phrik	to live with only one wife	
กินน้ำไม่เผื่อแล้ง	kin nam mai phuea laeng	drink water without sparing any for drought	to spend what one has without consideration for the future	
กินน้ำเห็นปลิง	kin nam hen pling	drink water while seeing a leech	to be disconcerted, as in when one means to drink water but sees a leech in it	
กินบนเรือนขี้บนหลังคา	kin bon ruean khi bon langkha	to eat in the house then defecate on the roof	to be ungrateful	
กินบุญเก่า	kin bun kao	eat old merit	to receive the results of good deeds from past lives; (of wealthy persons) to live off old wealth, e.g. inheritance	
กินปูนร้อนท้อง	kin pun ron thong	eat lime, feel the belly burn	to act conspicuously (for fear of one's deeds being revealed)	
กินรังแตน	kin rang taen	eat a wasp nest	to be irritable	
กินลมกินแล้ง	kin lom kin laeng	eat dry wind	not having any benefit	
กินเศษกินเลย	kin set kin loei		to misappropriate a small portion for oneself	
กินสำรับ	kin samrap	eat from a served set	to eat fine food	
กินเหมือนหมู อยู่เหมือนหมา	kin muean mu yu muean ma	eat like a pig, live like a dog	messy and untidy	also appears as กินอย่างหมู อยู่อย่างหมา (kin yang mu yu yang ma)
กินเหล็กกินไหล	kin lek kin lai	eat iron, eat lai (a mythical metal)	extraordinarily able to bear labour or pain	
กินอยู่กับปาก อยากอยู่กับท้อง	kin yu kap pak yak yu kap thong		to know but pretend not to	
กู่ไม่กลับ	ku mai klap	not returning after a yodelling call	not listening to objections; unstoppable	
เก็บดอกไม้ร่วมต้น	kep dok mai ruam ton	pick flowers from the same tree	to be together as a result of having made merit together in a previous life	also appears as เด็ดดอกไม้ร่วมต้น (det dok mai ruam ton)
เก็บเบี้ยใต้ถุนร้าน	kep bia tai thun ran	pick up cowry shells under the platform	to make small savings	
เกลียดตัวกินไข่ เกลียดปลาไหลกินน้ำแกง	kliat tua kin khai kliat pla lai kin nam kaeng	hate the animal but eat its eggs, hate eels but drink the broth	to dislike someone, yet want to receive benefits from them	
เกลือจิ้มเกลือ	kluea chim kluea	salt dipped in salt	(of two persons) not conceding to each other	
เกลือเป็นหนอน	kluea pen non	salt becoming maggots	betrayal by close family or friends	also appears as ไส้เป็นหนอน (sai pen non, innards becoming maggots)
เกี่ยวก้อย	kiao koi	hook (each other's) little fingers	to show closeness or affection	
เกี่ยวแฝกมุงป่า	kiao faek mung pa	cutting vetiver grass to roof the forest	to attempt something beyond one's abilities	
แกว่งเท้าหาเสี้ยน	kwaeng thao ha sian	swing one's foot in search of a splinter	to get into trouble	
แกะดำ	kae dam	black sheep	one who acts differently from the group	
ใกล้เกลือกินด่าง	klai kluea kin dang	near salt, eat lye	not knowing the value of something readily accessible, instead opting for something inferior	
ไก่แก่แม่ปลาช่อน	kai kae mae pla chon	old chicken, mother snakehead fish	a crafty old woman	
ไก่บินไม่ตกดิน	kai bin mai tok din	A chicken can fly without falling to the ground.	an area of densely situated buildings	
ไก่รองบ่อน	kai rong bon	second-rated cock in the ring	one who serves as a substitute and may be called into service	
ไก่เห็นตีนงู งูเห็นนมไก่	kai hen tin ngu ngu hen nom kai	chicken sees snake's feet, snake sees chicken's boobs	both knowing of each other's secrets	
ไก่อ่อน	kai on	young chick	one who has little experience and is easily deceived	also appears as ไก่อ่อนสอนขัน (kai on son khan)
ไกลปืนเที่ยง	klai puen thiang	far from the noon cannon	(of a person) simple, as a result of living far from development	
ขนหน้าแข้งไม่ร่วง	khon na khaeng mai ruang	shin hairs not falling off	(of a wealthy person) not inconvenienced by having to pay a large, yet relatively small to them, amount of money	
ขนหัวลุก	khon hua luk	hairs of the head standing up	very frightened or scared	
ขนทรายเข้าวัด	khon sai khao wat	carry sand into the wat	to help benefit the public/community	
ขนมผสมน้ำยา	khanom phasom nam ya	khanom chin with nam ya sauce	equal and befitting each other	
ข่มเขาโคขืนให้กินหญ้า	khom khao kho khuen hai kin ya	force cattle by its horns to eat grass	to force someone to do as one wants	
ขมิ้นกับปูน	khamin kap pun	turmeric and lye	(of two persons) argumentative when meeting each other; disliking each other	
ขว้างงูไม่พ้นคอ	khwang ngu mai phon kho	throw a snake no farther than one's own neck	to do something resulting in negative consequences for oneself	
ขวานผ่าซาก	khwan pha sak	axe splitting a carcass	(of a person's manner of speech) direct and inconsiderate	
ของหายตะพายบาป	khong hai taphai bap		to blame others when something is lost or missing	
ข้าเก่าเต่าเลี้ยง	kha kao tao liang		a long-familiar person; a long-serving servant	
ข้านอกเจ้าบ่าวนอกนาย	kha nok chao bao nok nai		one whose acts defy order or tradition	
ข้ามน้ำข้ามทะเล	kham nam kham thale	cross over water and sea	to fight through obstacles in order to succeed	also appears as ข้ามน้ำข้ามท่า (kham nam kham tha)
ขายผ้าเอาหน้ารอด	khai pha ao na rod	sell cloth to save face	to sacrifice important property to save one's name	
ขายหน้าวันละห้าเบี้ย	khai na wan la ha bia	Selling your face for 5 dollars a day	to cause embarrassment every day	
ข้าวก้นบาตร	khao kon bat	rice at the bottom of an alms bowl	food left over from monks' meals, which temple boys eat	
ข้าวแดงแกงร้อน	khao daeng kaeng ron	brown rice, hot soup	kindness, favours	
ข้าวยากหมากแพง	khao yak mak phaeng	rice being difficult, areca nuts being expensive	a state of famine	
ข้าวเหลือเกลืออิ่ม	khao luea kluea im	rice being in excess, salt being satiating	a country with plentiful food	
ข้าวใหม่ปลามัน	khao mai pla man	new rice, tasty fish	the state of something new being regarded as good; usually referring to newlyweds	
ขิงก็รา ข่าก็แรง	khing ko ra kha ko raeng		(of two persons) both being hot-tempered, neither one backing down	
ขี่ช้างจับตั๊กแตน	khi chang chap takkataen	ride an elephant to catch grasshoppers	to invest a lot for little gains	
ขี้ก้อนใหญ่ให้เด็กเห็น	khi kon yai hai dek hen	defecate a large turd for a child to see	to do something inappropriate in front of a child	
ขี้แพ้ชวนตี	khi phae chuan ti	loser calling for a fight	to be a sore loser	
ขี้ไม่ให้หมากิน	khi mai hai ma kin	defecate and refuse it for dogs to eat	to be a miser	
ขี้ราดโทษล่อง	khi rat thot long	make a mess and blame the toilet hole	to blame others for one's own fault	
ขึ้นต้นไม้สุดยอด	khuen ton mai sut yot	climb a tree to the very top	to reach the highest possible rank	
ขุดด้วยปากถากด้วยตา	khut duai pak thak duai ta	dig with the mouth, scrape with the eyes	to display contempt with words and looks	
ขุดดินกินหญ้า	khut din kin ya	dig the earth, eat the grass	to do what little work which just feeds oneself	
ขุดบ่อล่อปลา	khut bo lo pla	dig a pond, lure the fish	to plot and deceive others for one's own benefit	
ขุนนางใช่พ่อแม่ หินแง่ใช่ตายาย	khun nang chai pho mae hin ngae chai ta yai	Nobles are not one's parents; rough stones are not one's grandparents.	One should not trust others apart from one's parents and grandparents.	
ขุนไม่เชื่อง	khun mai chueang	fed but not tame	ungrateful	also appears as ขุนไม่ขึ้น (khun mai khuen)
เข็นครกขึ้นเขา	khen khrok khuen khao	push a rice pounder up a hill	to engage in an extremely difficult task requiring a lot of effort and patience, sometimes beyond one's capacity	
เข้าด้ายเข้าเข็ม	khao dai khao khem	in the thread and the needle	almost succeeding, but susceptible to be foiled by a small mistake or interruption	
เข้าตามตรอกออกตามประตู	khao tam trok ok tam pratu	enter by the street, exit by the door	to follow tradition in asking to marry	
เข้าเถื่อนอย่าลืมพร้า	khao thuean ya luem phra	enter the forest, do not forget the machete	to be cautious	
เข้ารกเข้าพง	khao rok khao phong	go into the bushes	to say or do something unrelated or incorrectly as a result of lack of expertise	
เข้าหูซ้ายทะลุหูขวา	khao hu sai thalu hu khwa	enter the left ear, go throughout the right	not learning what one is taught	
เขียนด้วยมือลบด้วยตีน	khian duai mue lop duai tin	write with the hand, erase with the foot	to praise but then later destroy	
เขียนเสือให้วัวกลัว	khian suea hai wua klua	draw a tiger to scare the cattle	to do something to frighten the other party	
เขียว ๆ แดง ๆ	khiao khiao daeng daeng	green and red	colourfully dressed women	
แขกไม่ได้รับเชิญ	khaek mai dai rap choen	uninvited guest	undesirable people or animals likely to cause damage or inconvenience, usually referring to thieves or certain animals	
แข่งกับเวลา	khaeng kap wela	race with time	to do something quickly	
แข่งเรือแข่งแพแข่งได้ แข่งบุญแข่งวาสนาแข่งไม่ได้	khaeng ruea khaeng phae khaeng dai khaeng bun khaeng watsana khaeng mai dai	Competing in boat racing, can be done; competing in fate and fortune, cannot be done.	to know one's own abilities and not attempt what is incapable of	
แขวนนวม	khwaen nuam	hang boxing gloves	retire from boxing; quit doing something	
ไข่ในหิน	khai nai hin	egg in the rock	something which is meticulously cared for	
สมน้ำหน้า	som nam na	In your face	You get what you deserve	
รีดเลือดกับปู	rit lueat kap pu	to squeeze blood from a crab	attempting to obtain something from somebody (especially money) that they do not have or cannot give up	
น้ำท่วมทุ่ง ผักบุ้งโหรงเหรง	nam thuam thung phak bung rongreng	The water floods the field, [but] the morning glory is sparse	Speaking a lot, but the content is small.	
