= Mammal Society of Japan =

Japanese society established to promote the study of mammals

Mammal Society of Japan (MSJ) General Incorporated Association
- 一般社団法人日本哺乳類学会
- Formation: 1987
- Purpose: Mammalogy
- Headquarters: 358-5, Yamabuki-chō (ja), Shinjuku, Tōkyō, Japan
- Coordinates: 35°42′33″N 139°43′46″E
- Members: 1,100
- Key people: Oshida Tatsuo (押田龍夫) (President)
- Website: Official website

The Mammal Society of Japan (日本哺乳類学会, Nihon Honyūrui Gakkai) is a Japanese society established in 1987 to promote the study of mammals.

== History ==
Upon its establishment, the Society united two predecessor organizations, the Mammalogical Society of Japan (日本哺乳動物学会), founded in 1949, and the Mammal Research Group (哺乳類研究グループ), established in 1963, which itself grew out of the Murid Research Group (ネズミ研究グループ), established in 1955. The Society, however, traces its origins back to the activities of the refounded Zoological Society of Japan (日本動物学会) in 1923, and as such celebrated its ninetieth anniversary in 2013.

== Publications ==
The Society publishes the quarterly journal Mammal Study, successor to the Journal of the Mammalogical Society of Japan, in English, and, in Japanese, the biannual Mammalian Science (哺乳類科学, Honyūrui Kagaku). It also oversaw publication, in 2015, of the second edition of The Wild Mammals of Japan. A 2018 supplement to Mammalian Science comprises the Japanese names for world mammal taxa, based on the third edition of Mammal Species of the World.

== See also ==
- List of mammals of Japan
- Japanese Red List
- Ornithological Society of Japan
