= R. G. Burton =

British-Indian hunter-naturalist and writer (1864–1951)

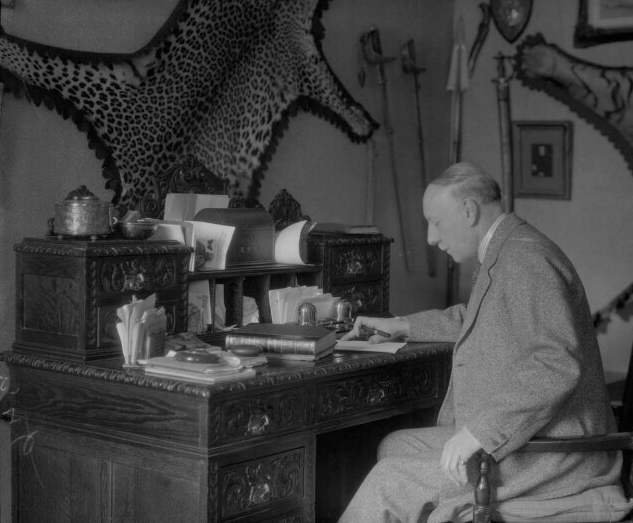
In 1933

Reginald George Burton (1864 – 2 February 1951) was a British Indian army officer, hunter-naturalist and writer of books on sports hunting and military history.

Burton was the fourth son of General Edmond Francis Burton of the Madras Staff Corps and his wife Ellen Georgina. He too joined the army and served in Jamaica with the 1st West India Regiment from 1884 and moved to the Bengal Staff Corps and then the 1st Infantry, Hyderabad Contingent in 1889. He worked at Simla in the headquarters and then commanded the 94th Russell's Infantry in 1909. He served at Gallipoli in 1915 and was invalided, serving at Wellington in the Nilgiris. He retired to Cheltenham working as a manager at the Boys' Sunday Schools. While in India, he followed his father's interest in sport hunting. He was a member of the Bombay Natural History Society and wrote several books on hunting including Tropics and Snows (1898), Sport and Wild Life in the Deccan (1928), A Book of man-eaters (1931), The Book of the Tiger (1933) and The Tiger Hunters (1936). He also wrote on military history including a History of the Hyderabad Contingent (1905), The First and Second Sikh Wars (1911), and From Boulogne to Austerlitz: Napoleon’s Campaign of 1805 (1912).

He married Elsie Mars, daughter of William Lumb in 1901 and they had a son who served in the RAF during World War II. His brother Lt. Col. R. W. Burton (1868-1963) was also a naturalist and member of the Bombay Natural History Society.
